= List of castles in Slovakia =

This is a list of castles in Slovakia. This list includes palaces, citadels and manor houses.

These Slovak words translate as follows:

1. hrad, hrádok - castle
2. zámok - correctly: château, commonly translated as castle
3. pevnosť - fortress, citadel
4. kaštieľ - mansion or manor house

== History ==
The history of Slovak castles traces back to the 9th century, when the Slavs initiated the construction of wooden fortifications in what is now Slovakia. By the 11th century, approximately a dozen stone castles emerged to replace these wooden structures, notably in cities such as Bratislava, Nitra, and Trenčín. From the Middle Ages until the 18th century, the nobility of the Kingdom of Hungary favored constructing their castles in the easily defensible regions of Slovakia. A prime example of these architectural feats is the well known Bratislava Castle. The earliest record of this castle dates back to the 10th century, although the hill on which it stands was occupied during both the Celtic and Great-Moravian periods. Despite facing numerous challenges, including fires and financial difficulties for its upkeep, Bratislava Castle endured through the ages. It has undergone renovations and now overlooks the Danube River from its elevated position. Slovaks chose to feature it as one of the three national symbols on their new euro coins, which were launched in January 2009.

== Preserved castles ==
Name	Image	Location	Notes
Banská Bystrica Castle		Banská Bystrica	
Betliar Mansion		Betliar	
Bojnice Castle		Bojnice	
Bratislava Castle		Bratislava	
Budimír Manor		Budimír	
Budatín Castle		Žilina	
Budmerice Mansion		Budmerice	
Bytča Castle		Bytča	
Červený Kameň Castle		Častá	
Červený Kláštor Mansion		Červený Kláštor	
Diviacka Nová Ves Manor		Diviacka Nová Ves	
Dolná Krupá manor		Dolná Krupá	
Halič Castle		Halič	
Hlohovec Castle		Hlohovec	
Hronsek Castle		Hronsek	
Hronský Beňadik Castle		Hronský Beňadik	
Humenné Mansion		Humenné	
Kežmarok Castle		Kežmarok	
Krásna Hôrka Castle		Rožňava	
Kremnica Castle		Kremnica	
Ľubovňa Castle		Stará Ľubovňa	
Malinovo Castle		Malinovo	
Markušovce Manor		Markušovce	
Markušovce castle		Markušovce	
Nitra Castle		Nitra	
Nový zámok		Banská Štiavnica	
Orava Castle		Oravský Podzámok	
Pezinok Castle		Pezinok	
Slovenská Ľupča Castle		Slovenská Ľupča	
Smolenice Castle		Smolenice	
Starý zámok (literally Old Castle)		Banská Štiavnica	
Stupava Mansion		Stupava	
Svätý Anton Mansion		Svätý Anton	
Strážky Manor		Spišská Belá	
Trenčín Castle		Trenčín	
Vígľaš Castle		Vígľaš	
Zvolen Castle		Zvolen	

== Castle ruins ==
Name	Image	Location	Notes
Beckov Castle		Beckov	
Biely Kameň		Svätý Jur	
Bíňa Castle		Bíňa	
Blatnica Castle		Blatnica	
Blh Castle		Blh	
Bošany Castle		Bošany	
Boťany Castle		Boťany	
Borša Castle		Borša	
Branč Castle		Podbranč	
Braničev Castle		Dargov	Perished castle built in the first half of the 13th century and demolished after 1317.
Brekov Castle		Brekov	Only Ruins Left
Breznica Castle		Breznica	Ruins of a castle, which was built in 13th century. It was first mentioned in 1273-76 in the description of the abbey of Svätý Beòadik (St. Benedictus). Breznica castle was built before the Tatar invasion by Philip, archbishop of Esztergom. Shortly after its reconstruction in 1423 into a Gothic fortress it was taken by Jiskra's Hussites and later in 1471 by the Polish king Casimir. The castle was destroyed after 1732 - it was used as a source of building material.
Brezovica Manor		Brezovica	
Brzotín Castle		Brzotín	Perished castle built in 14th century.
Budkovce Castle		Budkovce	
Bzovík Castle		Bzovík	
Cejkov Castle		Cejkov	A perished castle built in the 13th century and at the end of the 14th or the beginning of the 15th century demolished. Rebuilt again in the 15th century and in 1673 destroyed.
Čabraď Castle		Čabraď	
Čachtice Castle		Čachtice	
Čeklís Castle		Čeklís	Castle probably disappeared in the 16th century. In the early 20th century, a water tower was constructed in the shape of the castle. Now, however, the waterworks is in a state of ruins as well.
Čičava Castle		Čičava	
Čierny Castle		Zlatno	
Devín Castle		Bratislava	
Dievčí Castle		Iža	
Diviaky nad Nitricou Castle		Diviaky nad Nitricou	
Divín Castle		Divín	
Dobrá Niva Castle		Dobrá Niva	
Dobrá Voda Castle		Dobrá Voda	
Dolná Mičiná manor		Dolná Mičivá	
Dračí hrádok Castle		Bratislava	
Drienok Castle		Drienok	Ruins of groundworks of castle built in the second half of the 13th century and destroyed in the 15th century.
Drienov Castle		Drienov	Perished castle built in 13th century and perished in 15th century.
Dúbravica Castle		Dúbravica	
Ducové Hill-fort		Ducové	
Fiľakovo castle		Fiľakovo	
Gabčíkovo Mansion		Gabčíkovo	
Gaboltov Castle		Gaboltov	
Gelnica Castle		Gelnica	Ruins of a castle, which was built in the 13th century, demolished after 1528. In the half of the 16th century built again and extended, in 1685 destroyed by fire and only ruins remained from it.
Gemerský hrad		Tornaľa	
Gýmeš Castle		Jelenec	
Hajnáčka Castle		Hajnáčka	
Haniska Mansion		Haniska	
Hatalov Castle		Hatalov	
Havránok		Havránok	
Hertník Castle		Hertník	
Hertník Castle		Hertník	
Hliník nad Hronom Castle		Hliník nad Hronom	
Hodejov Castle		Hlohovec	Ruins of a castle, which was built in 13th century and destroyed by Osmans in 1571.
Holiša Castle		Holiša	
Holumnica Castle		Holumnica	Ruins of a castle which was built at the edge of 15th and 16th century. It was a square building without towers in Gothic and Renaissance style.
Hrabušice Castle		Hrabušice	
Hrachovo Castle		Hrachovo	
Hričov Castle		Hričov	
Hrušov Castle		Hostie	
Ilava Castle		Ilava	
Jasov Castle		Jasov	
Jasenov Castle		Jasenov	
Jelšava Castle		Jelšava	
Kolárovo Castle		Kolárovo	
Fortress of Komárno		Komárno	
Korlátka Castle		Cerová	
Kuchyňa Castle		Kuchyňa	
Lednica Castle		Lednica	
Leopoldov Fortress		Leopoldov	Currently the Leopoldov Prison
Levice Castle		Levice	
Lietava Castle		Lietava	
Likava Castle		Likavka	
Liptov Castle		Liptovský Mikuláš	
Liptovský Hrádok Castle		Liptovský Hrádok	
Markušovce Castle		Markušovce	
Modrý Kameň Castle		Modrý Kameň	
Muráň Castle		Muráň	
Old Litava Castle		Cerovo	
Oponice Castle		Oponice, Nitra Region	
Ostrý Kameň Castle		Buková	
Pajštún Castle		Borinka	
Plavecký Castle		Plavecké Podhradie	
Považský Castle		Považská Bystrica	
Pustý Castle		Zvolen	
Revište Castle		Žarnovica	
Sitno Castle		Ilija	
Sklabiňa Castle		Sklabinský Podzámok	
Slanec Castle		Slanec	
Spiš Castle		Žehra	
Starhrad		Nezbudská Lúčka	
Strečno Castle		Strečno	
Súľov Castle		Súľov-Hradná	
Šariš Castle		Veľký Šariš	
Šášov Castle		Žiar nad Hronom	
Šomoška Castle		Šiatorská Bukovinka	
Tematín Castle		Nové Mesto nad Váhom	
Tisovec Castle		Tisovec	
Topoľčany Castle		Topoľčany	
Uhrovec Castle		Uhrovec	
Viniansky Castle		Vinné	
Vršatec castle		Vršatské Podhradie	
Zborov Castle		Zborov	
Zemplín Castle		Zemplín	
Zniev Castle		Kláštor pod Znievom	
Žilina Castle		Žilina	Castle ruins unearthed during archeologic survey before construction of Mirage shopping center. Placed in Mirage shopping center.

== Lost castles ==
Name	Image	Location	Notes
Parkan (castle)		Štúrovo	Ottoman fortress built in 1546, demolished soon after it was captured by the Habsburgs in 1683.

== See also ==
- List of castles in Europe
- List of castles
