= Brezovica Manor =

Historic site in Slovakia

Coordinates: 49°08′36″N 20°51′07″E

- Kaštieľ Brezovica
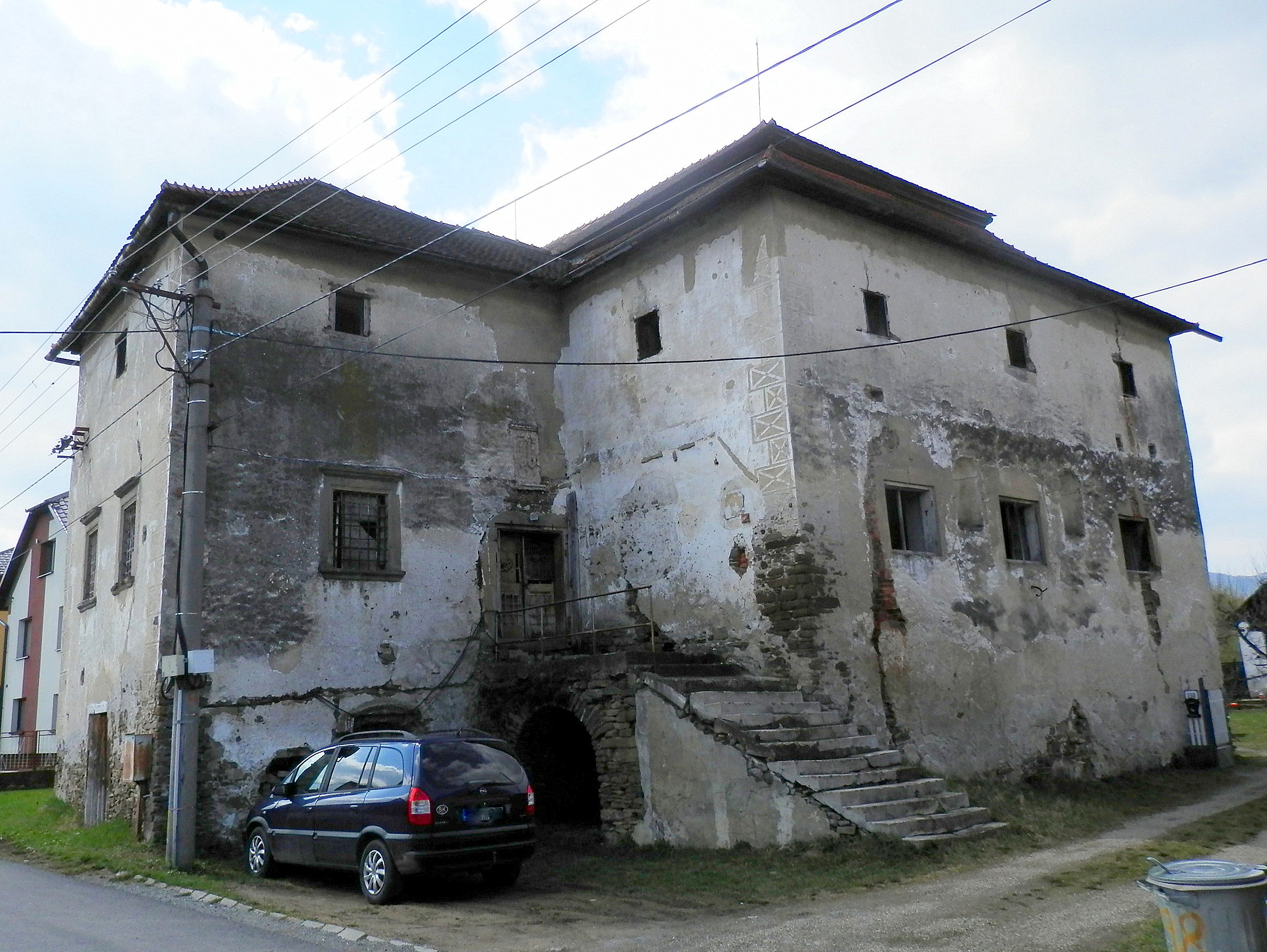
- The manor ruins in 2017

Site information
- Type: Manor

Site history
- Built: 17th century

Brezovica Manor is the ruins of a manor house located in Brezovica in the Prešov Region of Slovakia.

== History ==
Brezovica, a village established along the Via Magna route connecting Šariš and Spiš Regions, was first documented in 1317 when the Berzeviczy family constructed a castle there. It is likely that the original name of the village, Hamburg, originates from the German words "ham," meaning a promontory or hill, and "burg," meaning castle. Together, they translate to "Castle on a promontory". Brezovica Manor, probably built by Michal Berzeviczy, served as the family's residence for over two hundred years. By the late 15th century, the castle had fallen into ruin, leaving only the terrain and ramparts visible today. After abandoning the castle, the Berzeviczy family moved to the village and built a Renaissance manor along with seven other stately homes. The manor features a two-wing design with a risalit and an open staircase. An inscription and coats of arms on the main entrance commemorate their efforts. Although the manor's origins date to the 16th century, it was likely completed or renovated in 1602, with Anna overseeing the final touches after Ján's death in 1601. Anna passed away in 1637.

Following reconstruction work in 2007, the manor's architectural details were removed and the building was repurposed to serve as a seat of the Municipal Office.

== See also ==
- List of castles in Slovakia
