= Branč Castle =

Historic site in Slovakia

Coordinates: 48°43′59″N 17°28′02″E

- Branč Hrad
- Podbranč, Trnava Region, Slovakia
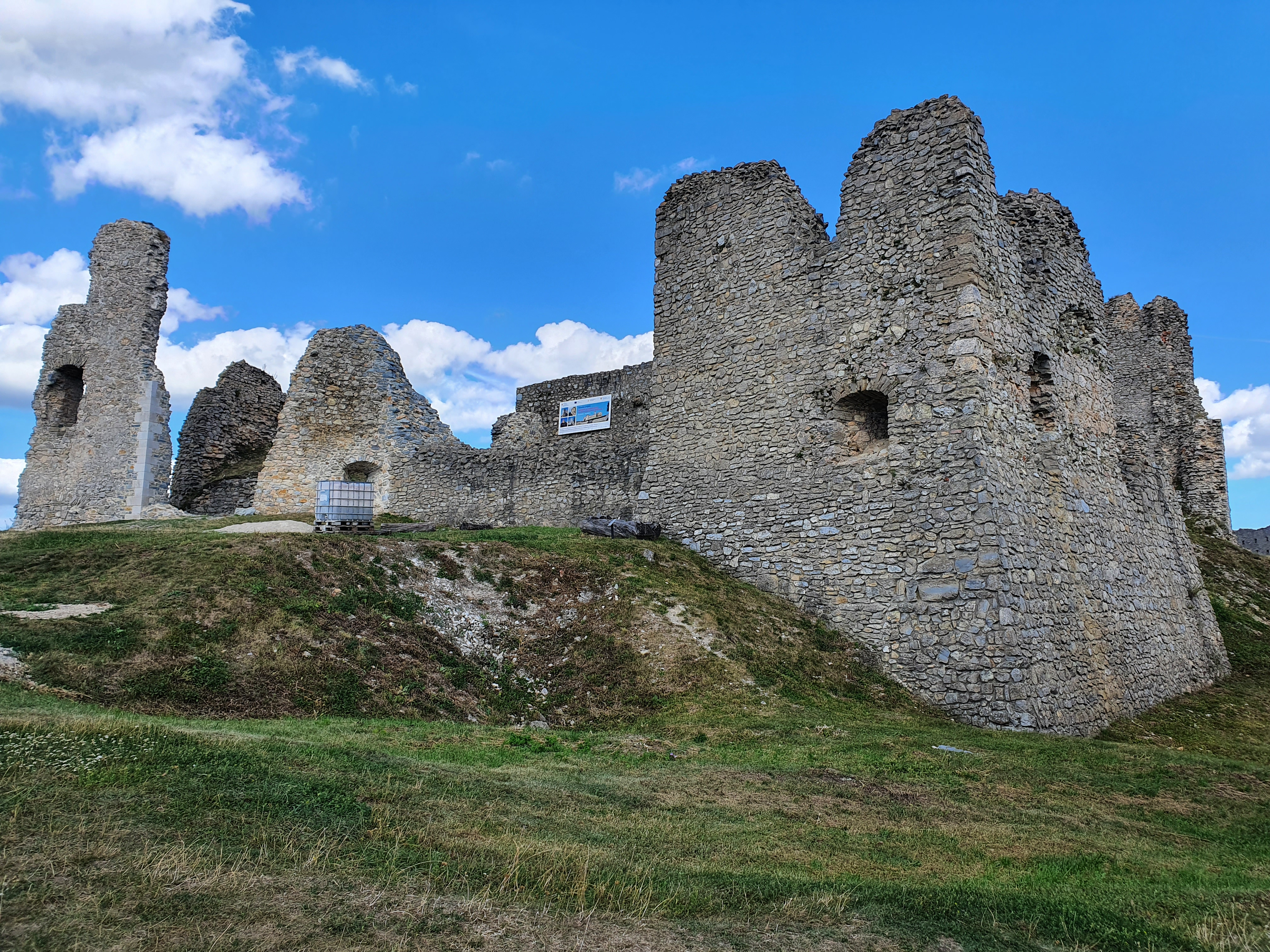

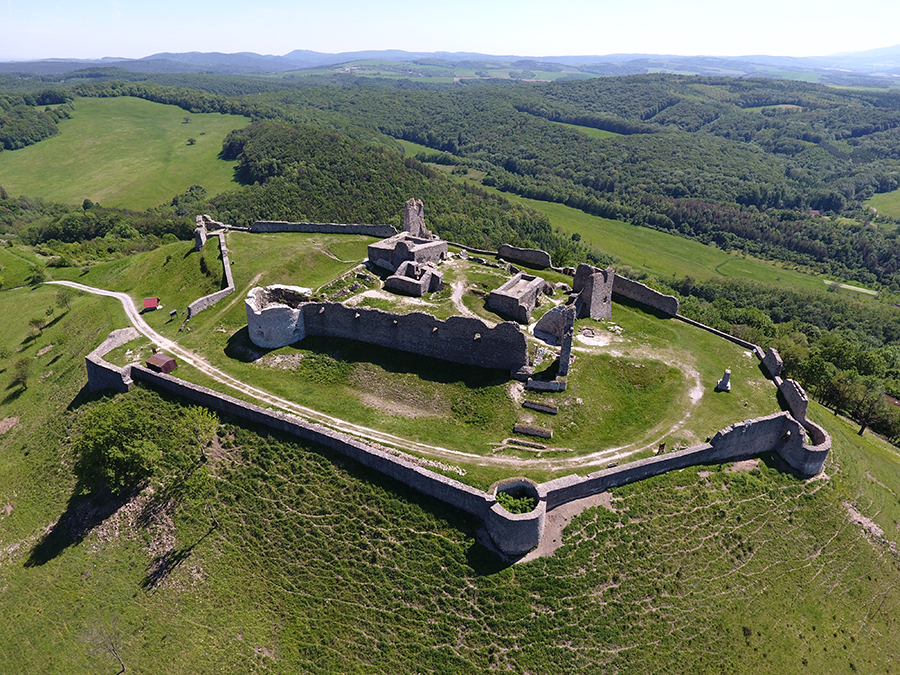
- Aerial photograph of Branč Castle

Site information
- Type: Castle
- Condition: In ruins

Site history
- Built: 1251–1261

Branč Castle (Slovak: Branč Hrad) is a castle located in the village of Branč in the Trnava Region of Slovakia. The castle is situated on a hill that rises to an elevation of 475 meters above the village of Podbranč, close to the town of Senica in the Trnava Region of Slovakia.

Branč Castle was part of a network of frontier castles that ensured the safety of the routes leading from Moravia to the Carpathian passes. Constructed in the 13th century, it served as the administrative center for a large estate. By the end of the 17th century, the castle was destroyed by fire and subsequently fell into disrepair. Today, only the remnants of the walls of various buildings and some sections of the lower castle remain.

== History ==
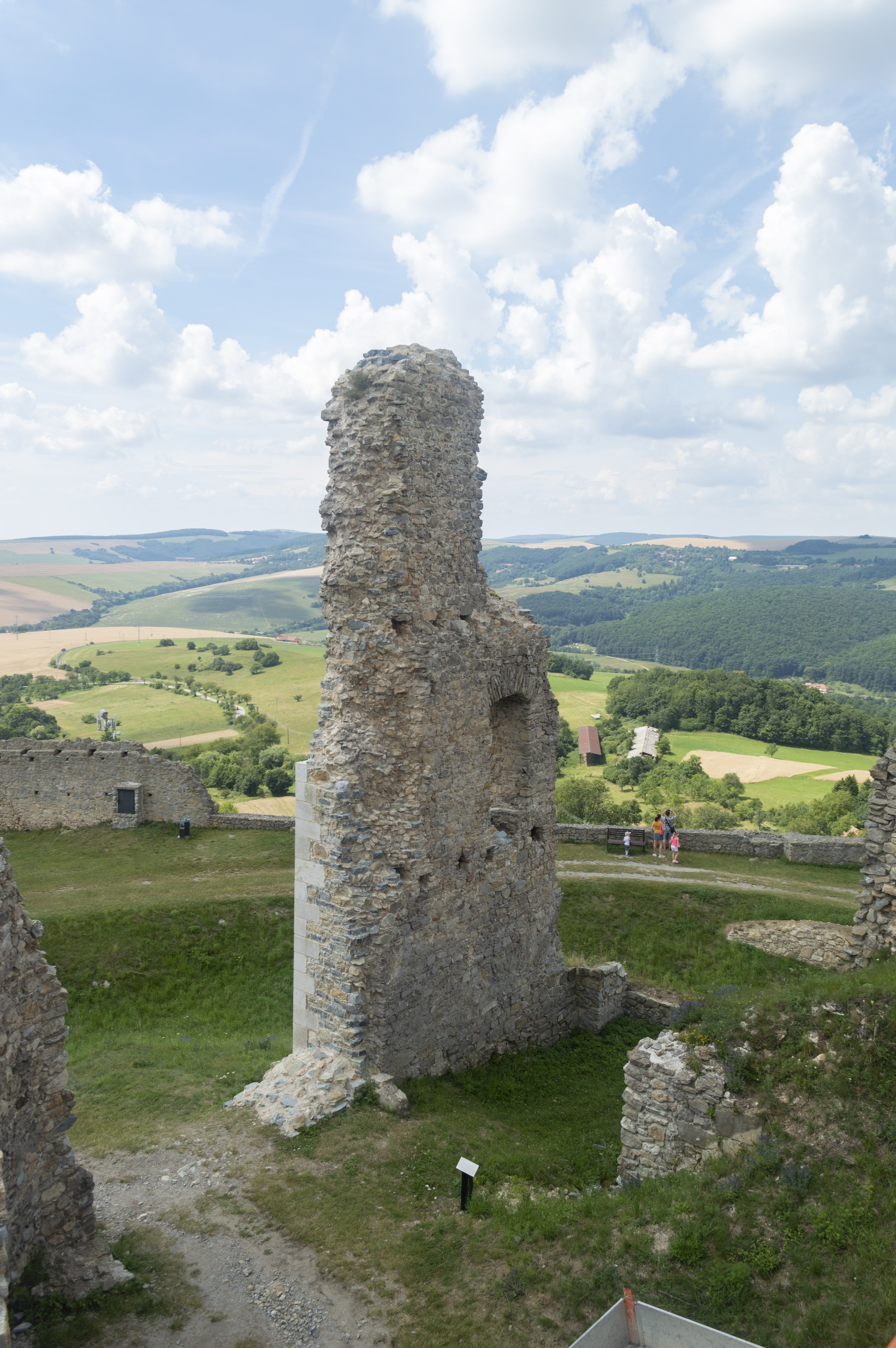
The ruins are located 475 m above Podbranč.

Hrad Branč is one of the oldest castles in Záhorie, with the first written mention dating back to 1317. Based on coin findings from the years 1251 to 1261, it is likely that during this period, the castle was constructed by Master Aba of Hlohovec. In 1297, the Aba family exchanged their estate, which included the stone castle Branč, for other properties with Master Abrahám Rúfus. Subsequently, in 1309, Matthew III Csák compelled Rúfus to relinquish the castle estate. After Csák's death, the castle was owned for a time by his relative, Master Štefan of Šternberk.

For a brief period, the castle was also owned by King Charles Robert, John of Luxembourg, and in 1394 by Sigismund of Luxembourg. Following this, Sigismund gifted the castle to Stibor of Stiborice. This period marks the beginning of the reconstruction of the central castle. The result was a typically Gothic rock castle featuring an assault tower, a palace, a chapel, and a high surrounding wall in the southeastern corner of the central castle.

Around 1453, the notorious brigand and warrior Pongrác Szentmiklósi seized the castle, using it as a base for his raiding incursions into Moravia and Austria. At the start of the 16th century, a share of the estate was acquired by Lord Osvald, the owner of the nearby Korlátka castle, while the other part belonged to Eufrozína Pongrácz, who was married to Bernard Nyári. After the battle of Hungarian forces against the Ottomans at Mohács in 1526, Ferenc Nyáry, the son of Eufrozína, moved to his mother's Branč estate and, through marriage to Osvald's granddaughter Alžbeta, acquired a portion of his estate as well. In 1551, Ferenc Nyáry died childless, bequeathing his properties to relatives. The last members of the Nyáry family lived here, having built a new manor house in Sobotište, where they gradually relocated.

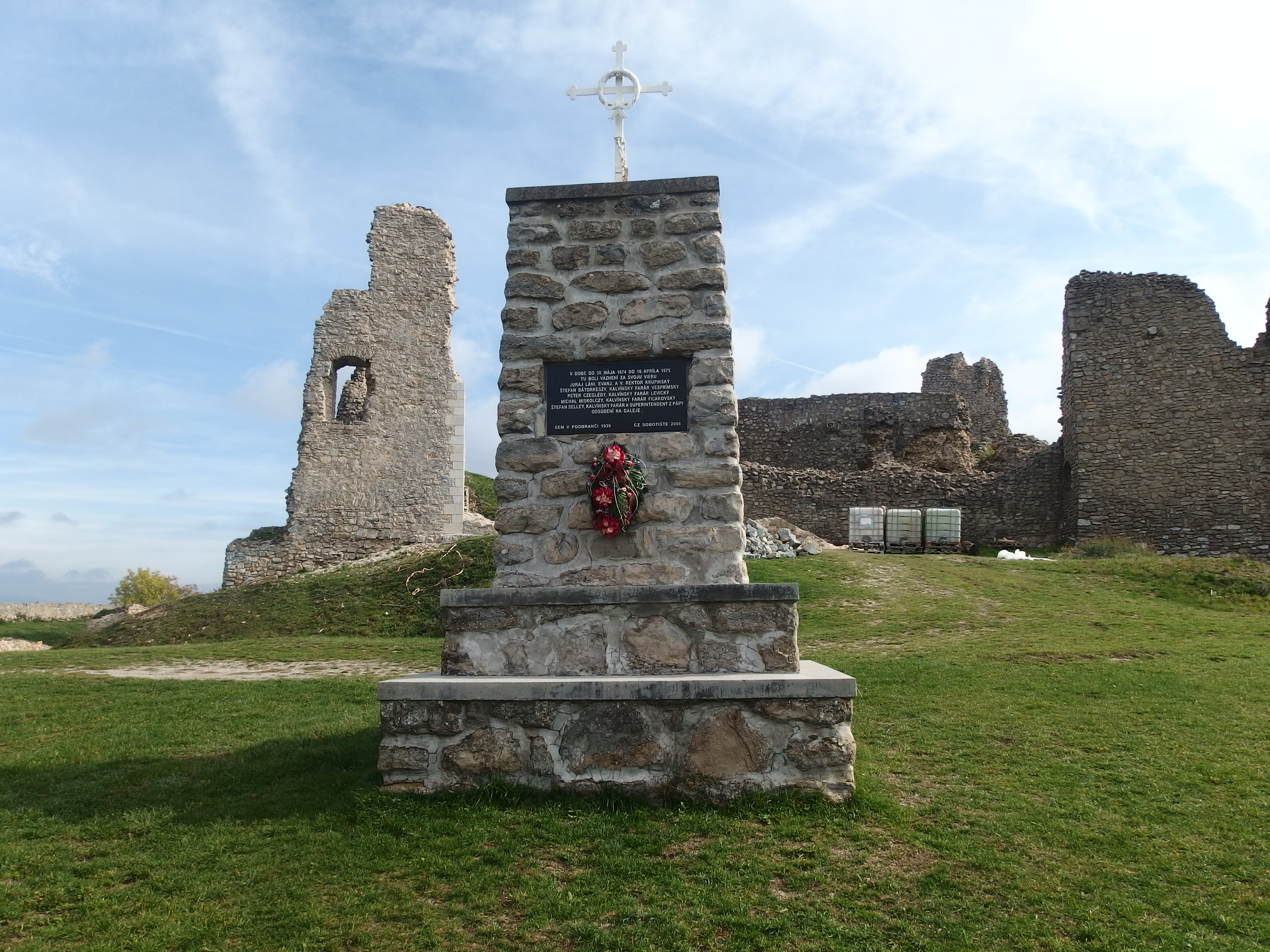
The memorial located just outside of the castle walls.

The subsequent Thököly uprising signaled the beginning of the end for the castle, which saw conflict in 1683. Branč Castle was overseen solely by the castellan. It served as a temporary detention center for Protestant priests condemned to galleys. Many died in the so-called pits, a prison located around the castle's perimeter. A memorial situated in the courtyard honors this event. At the dawn of the 18th century, the dilapidated structures of the castle were deliberately damaged by previous owners, and the fortifications also deteriorated. The castle became uninhabited and fell into neglect.

In 1968, efforts were made to restore the castle historically, but these efforts were never finalized. Since 1978, archaeological investigations have been conducted at the site. Over five seasons, remnants of stone architecture, including pieces from windows, doors, and various fragments, were uncovered in the excavated areas. A notable discovery was a decorative stone ledge featuring a shield that bore the date of the castle's reconstruction completion in 1539, along with the monogram of its owner, František Nyáry, as well as original wooden components of the castle.

=== Recent years: 1989– present ===
Following 1989, investigations and modifications to the monuments concentrated on specific sections of the castle. This research yielded additional insights into the evolution of the castle's entrance and successfully stabilized the most vulnerable side wall of the gate tower within the central castle. In 2009, a section of the southern wall of the upper castle, which had collapsed in 1978, was restored, and by 2012, the structure of the circular cannon bastion located in the northeastern corner of the middle castle was also repaired. Efforts continued on the brickwork of the bridge piers with the objective of reinstating the historical access to the central castle. In 2012, an architectural-historical study of the cannon bastion was conducted, and in 2016, research on the eastern palace was carried out under the direction of Michal Šimkovic. The following year, 2017, saw research directed at the western wall of the first forecourt, and in 2020, the focus shifted to the western palace.

== Architecture ==
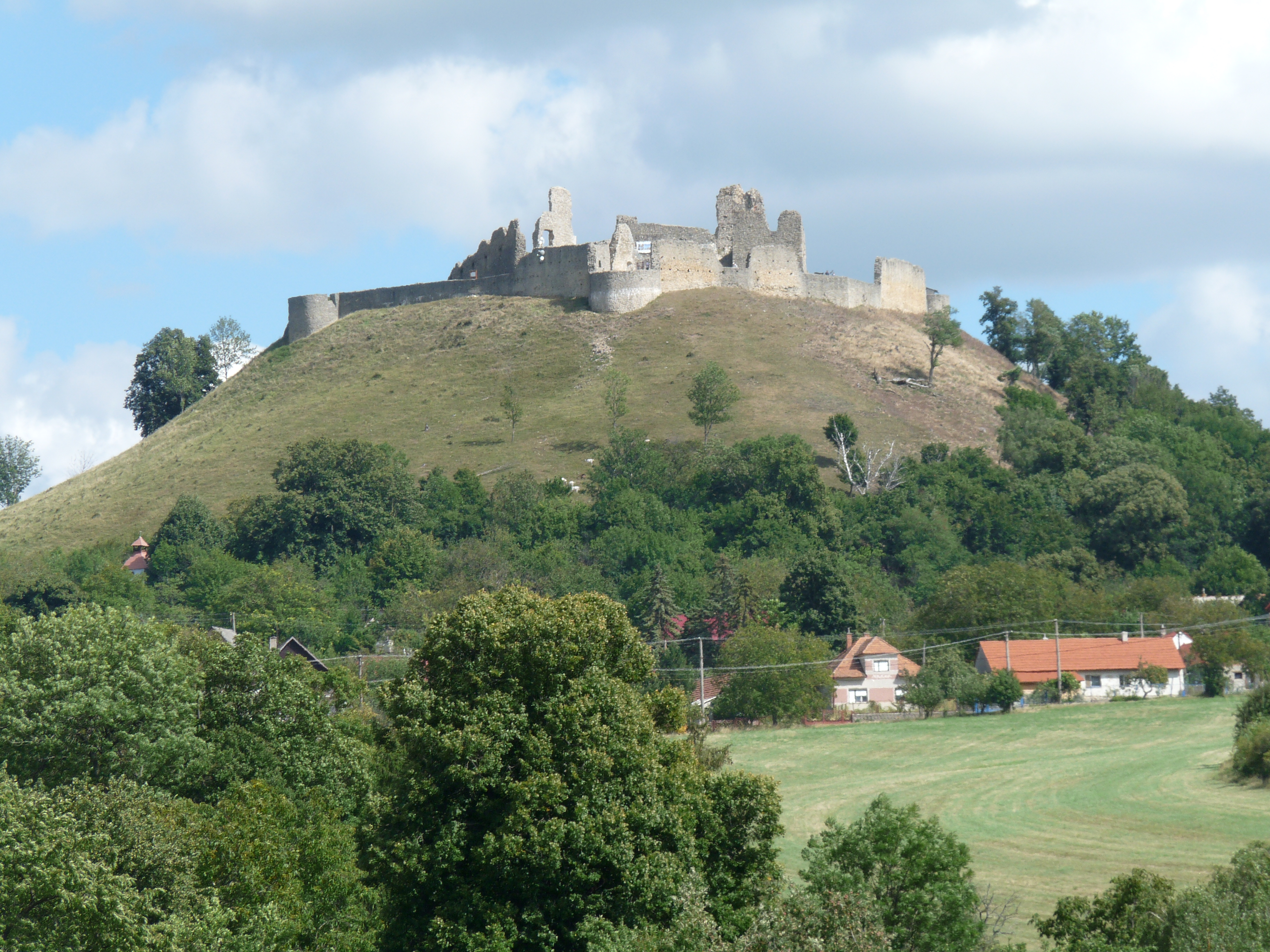
The hill which the ruins are located.

The oldest sections of the castle comprise a two-space palace block located on the eastern side of the inner courtyard of the castle. The castle is split into two primary sections: the lower castle and the middle castle. A notably dry and deep moat separates the middle castle from the lower castle, enhancing the natural elevation of the middle castle's fortifications. The original entrance to the middle castle was situated in the corner opposite the monument. Even in areas where the ground is level (where there was no ditch—though it once existed, it was filled by the collapse of the upper and middle castle), attackers had to navigate an 80-meter ditch while facing direct fire from the castle's defenders. Functionally, the middle castle is divided into two sections: the northern courtyard and the residential palace. A staircase from the courtyard led to the atrium courtyard and the various rooms. There were a total of 40 rooms—15 on the ground floor, 20 on the first floor, and 5 on the second floor. Additionally, a well was located in the western courtyard of the lower castle. An older well was also present in the courtyard of the middle castle, situated near the only room that was accessible.

== See also ==
- List of castles in Slovakia
- Wikimedia Commons has media related to Branč Castle
