= Florián Manor =

Historic site in Slovakia

Coordinates: 48°47′53″N 21°18′31″E

- kaštieľ Florián
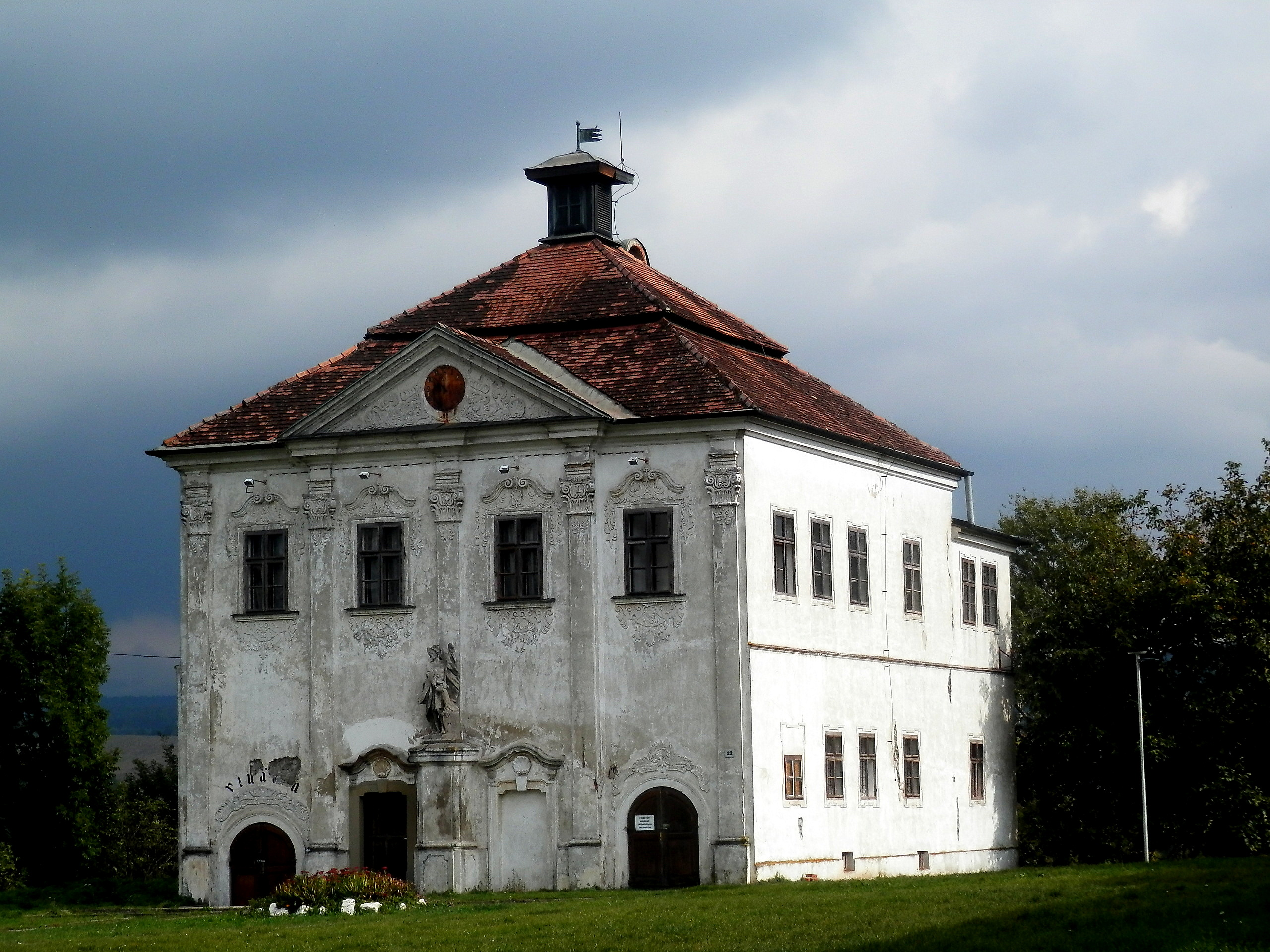
- The manor house in 2016 prior to its renovation

Florián Manor (Slovak: kaštieľ Florián; also referred to as Old Manor Budimír) is a historic site located in the village of Budimír in the Košice Region of Slovakia.

== History ==
The Florián manor was built on a site of an earlier fortified residence from the 13th century. Archaeological studies verified the presence of the original fortified residence, which impacted the subsequent construction phases of the manor. It underwent various reconstructions, notably in the 1770s in Rococo style, and features a Baroque statue of St. Florian. The manor was owned by the Ujházy family for generations, passing through several heirs, and was affected by political changes in the 20th century. After World War I, it was temporarily abandoned, then repurposed for social and cultural use in later years. The estate suffered damage and neglect, but restoration efforts began in 2011, culminating in a major renovation in 2016–2017. The 2023 renovation focused on the inside of the manor, costing €300,000. Noawadays, the manor serves as the municipal office, village information center, and library.

== Architecture ==
The manor, built on the site of a former Gothic castle, has a two-story, rectangular structure renovated in the 18th-century Rococo-classical style. Its facade is symmetrical with decorative elements, including pilasters, a triangular shield, and a statue of St. Floriana. The interior includes a hall with a barrel vault, and the building has undergone restoration.

== See also ==
- Budimír Manor
