= Cejkov Castle =

Former castle located in Slovakia

Coordinates: 48.4631°N 21.7657°E

Cejkov Castle (Slovak: Cejkovský hrad; also referred to simply as Cejkov) is a perished castle built in the 13th century and at the end of the 14th or the beginning of the 15th century demolished. It was located in the village of Cejkov. It was rebuilt again in the 15th century and in 1673 destroyed.

== History ==
The castle guarded the road from Zemplín to Trebišov. It was probably built in the 13th century or early 14th century. The Cejkov branch of the Kaplon family owned it until 1403. At that time, King Sigismund confiscated the family's property for their disloyalty to the monarch and had the castle demolished. In 1407, he gave the confiscation to Peter Soós and Mátyás Kelecsényi and at the same time allowed the castle to be rebuilt by the yeoman from Pozdišovce. The new owners wanted to restore the castle, but as early as 1438 it was reported to be in ruins. In the 15th century, it was also in the hands of the Brethren troops for a time. In 1471, the Hungarian Diet ordered the demolition of the castle, which probably did not happen, because it is also mentioned later. The definitive destruction of the castle was caused by the imperial army in 1673 during the Thököly Uprising.

== Current state ==
On the conical hill above the village there are traces of ramparts and ditches. At the highest point there are traces of a natural stone base on which the main residential building probably stood. On the northwestern side of the building there is a fragment of the wall of this building. From the circular tower protecting the entrance from the northeast, only a crater with a diameter of 7 m and traces of farm buildings in the undulating forefield remain.

== Description ==
=== Exterior ===
The two-part castle was surrounded by a rampart and a ditch. On the north-eastern side there is an oval space of the fort, at the head of which there is a round depression with a diameter of about seven meters, which may be the remains of a tower. The remaining buildings of the fort were probably wooden. The plateau of the castle core exceeds the fort by eight to ten meters. It has a trapezoidal ground plan with dimensions of 14 × 10 meters. Due to the cramped conditions, there was only one stone building in it, probably a tower-shaped palace.

== See also ==
- List of castles in Slovakia
