= Haniska =

Haniska may refer to several places in Slovakia:

- Haniska, Košice-okolie District, a village and municipality
- Haniska, Prešov District, a village and municipality
