= Dolná Mičiná =

Dolná Mičiná Alsómicsinye
- Municipality
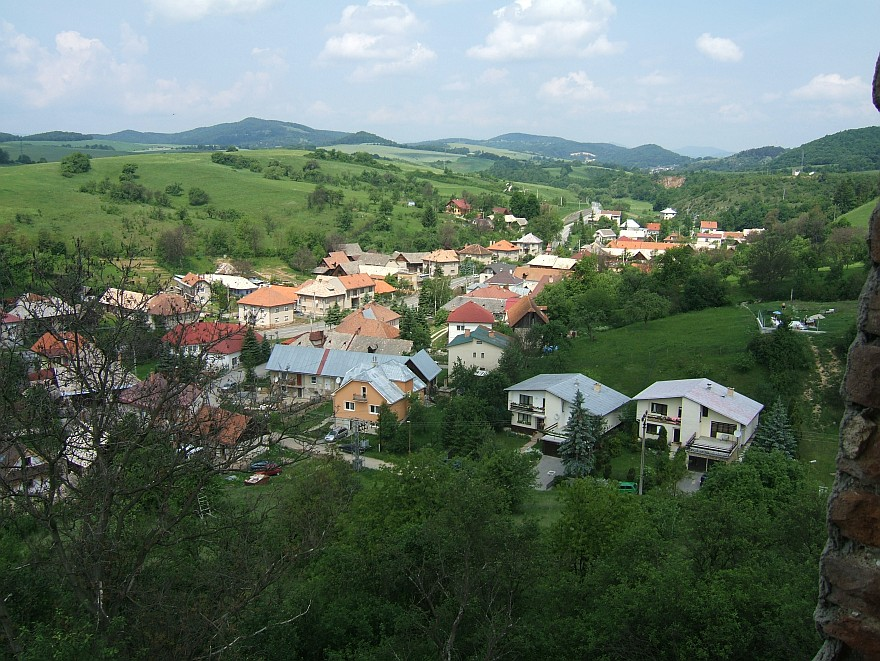

- Flag

- Location of Dolná Mičiná in the Banská Bystrica Region Location of Dolná Mičiná in Slovakia
- Coordinates: 48.68°N 19.23°E
- Country: Slovakia
- Region: Banská Bystrica Region
- District: Banská Bystrica District
- First mentioned: 1402

Government
  - Mayor: Ondrej Hudec

Area
  - Total: 9.46 km^{2} (3.65 sq mi)
- Elevation: 388 m (1,273 ft)

Population (2025)
  - Total: 524
- Time zone: UTC+1 (CET)
  - Summer (DST): UTC+2 (CEST)
- Postal code: 974 01
- Area code: +421 48
- Vehicle registration plate (until 2022): BB
- Website: dolnamicina.sk

Dolná Mičiná (Hungarian: Alsómicsinye) is a village and municipality of the Banská Bystrica District in the Banská Bystrica Region of Slovakia.

== Geography ==
The municipality lies at an altitude of 388 metres (1,273 ft) and covers an area of 9.46 km^{2} (3.65 sq mi) (2025).

== History ==
In historical records, the village was first mentioned in 1402 (1402 Alsowfalu, 1565 Inferior Mychyna, 1572 Mykefalwa). In the 16th century, it belonged to the local feudatory Micsinyey, and, later on, to the Benicky family.

== Manor ==
The Dolná Mičiná manor is the ruins of a manor house located in the village. It was originally a castle that was rebuilt into a Renaissance manor.

== Population ==
Population statistic (10 years)
Year	1995	2005	2015	2025
Count	328	362	392	524
Difference		+10.36%	+8.28%	+33.67%

Population statistic
Year	2024	2025
Count	520	524
Difference		+0.76%

It has a population of 524 people (31 December 2025).

=== Ethnicity ===
Census 2021 (1+ %)
Ethnicity	Number	Fraction
Slovak	421	95.89%
Not found out	18	4.1%
Total	439	

In year 2021 was 439 people by ethnicity 421 as Slovak, 18 as Not found out, 2 as Czech, 2 as Romani, 1 as Russian, 1 as Hungarian and 1 as Other.

Note on population: The difference values of population numbers in the table "Population statistic" and in the sections "Ethnicity" & "Religion" is caused by the use of various statistical methods.

=== Religion ===
Census 2021 (1+ %)
Religion	Number	Fraction
Roman Catholic Church	159	36.22%
Evangelical Church	137	31.21%
None	117	26.65%
Not found out	17	3.87%
Total	439	

In year 2021 was 439 people by religion 159 from Roman Catholic Church, 137 from Evangelical Church, 117 from None, 17 from Not found out, 3 from Greek Catholic Church, 2 from United Methodist Church, 2 from Ad hoc movements, 1 from Paganism and natural spirituality and 1 from Other.
