= Banská Bystrica Castle =

Historic site in Slovakia

- Mestský hrad v Banskej Bystrici
- Banská Bystrica, Slovakia
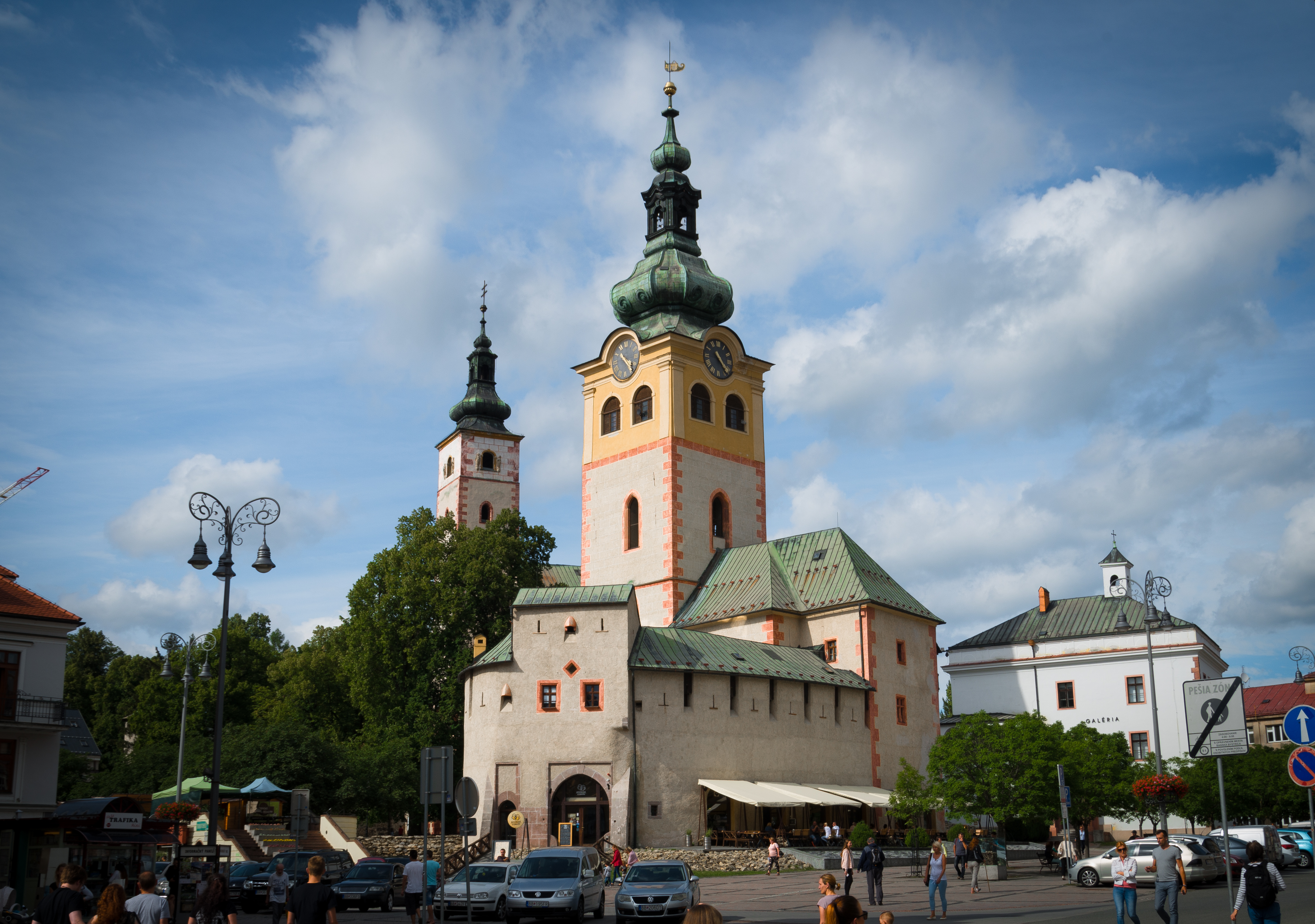

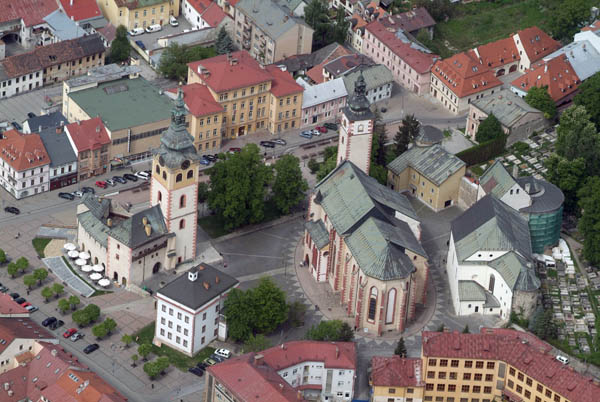
- Areal view of the castle complex

Site information
- Type: Castle

Location
- Coordinates: 48.737282°N 19.146734°E

Banská Bystrica Castle (Slovak: Mestský hrad v Banskej Bystrici; also referred to as a Barbican) is a castle located in the centre of Banská Bystrica in Slovakia.

It is a part of a complex that features several other buildings. The city castle complex consists of the Church of the Virgin Mary, Matthew's House, the Slovak Church, the town hall, the rectory building and a stone fortification with bastions, an entrance gate with a barbican, through which the area was entered. The oldest building is the late Romanesque parish church of the Virgin Mary from the second half of the 13th century. It was originally surrounded by a cemetery, on which a Romanesque ossuary stood until the 19th century.

== Location ==
During the 1500s, Banská Bystrica was one of the most significant cities in the Kingdom of Hungary in terms of strategic importance. It was also important due to the mining of copper and silver ores that was found in the nearby mountains. The hill where the important trade routes intersected was where Banská Bystrica Castle was built. High-ranking city officials, the mayor, and church representatives resided there. The City Castle was not meant for residential use, unlike royal or noble castles, it only served as a fortification.

== History ==
=== Construction ===
The city castle was built next to the original mining settlement that preceded the founding of the city. Already in those times, the parish church of the Assumption of the Virgin Mary stood here, which later, at the end of the Middle Ages, became the center of a new fortress. The function of the city castle was to protect the revenues from the mining of precious metals, especially copper and silver, and the royal treasury. The representative of the king and the church lived there, and the city council met there. Individual buildings of various functions were fortified with a common fortification that protected the patriciate from external enemies and internal unrest, especially during mining riots.

== See also ==
- List of castles in Slovakia
