= Červený Kláštor (monastery) =

Monastery in Červený Kláštor, Slovakia

Coordinates: 49°24′02″N 20°24′59″E

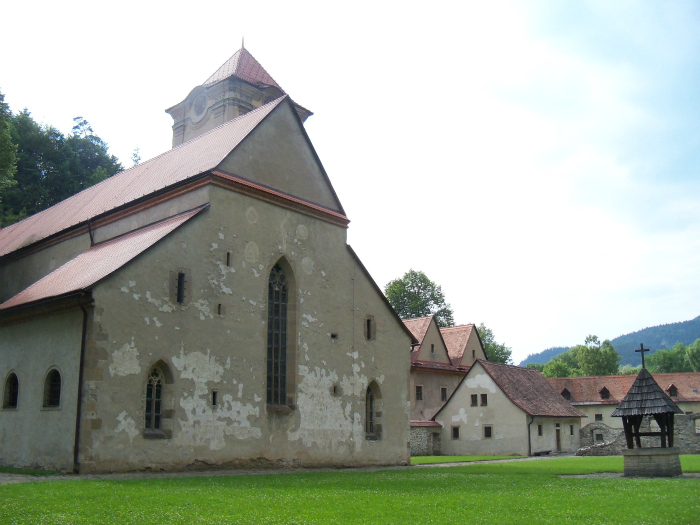
- Červený Kláštor (Red Monastery)
- Interactive map of Červený Kláštor

Monastery information
- Order: Carthusian, Camaldolese
- Established: 1319

Site
- Location: Pieniny Mountains, Slovakia (near Červený Kláštor)
- Website: https://muzeumcervenyklastor.sk/?lang=en

Červený Kláštor (Hungarian: Vöröskolostor; meaning Red Monastery) is a medieval monastery located in Slovakia. It is located near the village of Červený Kláštor within the Pieniny Mountains, next to the Dunajec River.

== Carthusian Period ==
The monastery was founded in the early 14th century, during the Hungarian Kingdom. Court documents from 1307 state that a man by the name of master Kokos from Brezovica (Berzevice), founded six monasteries as a punishment for murder. In 1319 he donated 62 sectors of his village, Lechnice to the Carthusian order. A wooden structure was built in 1330, which was later replaced by bricks and stones. The monastery gets the name "Red" from some brick, such as the cornices below the roofs and ribs of the vaults (unpaved in the chapter hall), and the red tiles that were used on the roofs.

The monastery suffered several quarrels with Czorsztyn lords, and was occupied by Hussites in 1431 and in 1433. It was adversely hit by the Battle of Mohács in 1515, and in 1545 Czorsztyn Knights from Niedzica Castle attacked the monastery, and the monks fled across the Dunajec River into Poland. The monastery was abolished during the Reformation in 1563, becoming a private residence for wealthy noblemen.

== Post Carthusian period ==
In 1699, Ladislav Maťašovský, a bishop in Nitra (Nyitra), purchased the monastery, and donated to the Camaldolese order, who settled down it this area in 1711. In 1782 it was secularized as part of Emperor Joseph II's campaign against monastic orders that in his view didn't pursue useful activities. The monastery's library was sold to Budapest, and the church equipment to Muszyna, Poland.

In 1820 the Emperor Franz Joseph I donated the monastery to the newly founded Greek-Catholic diocese of Prešov.

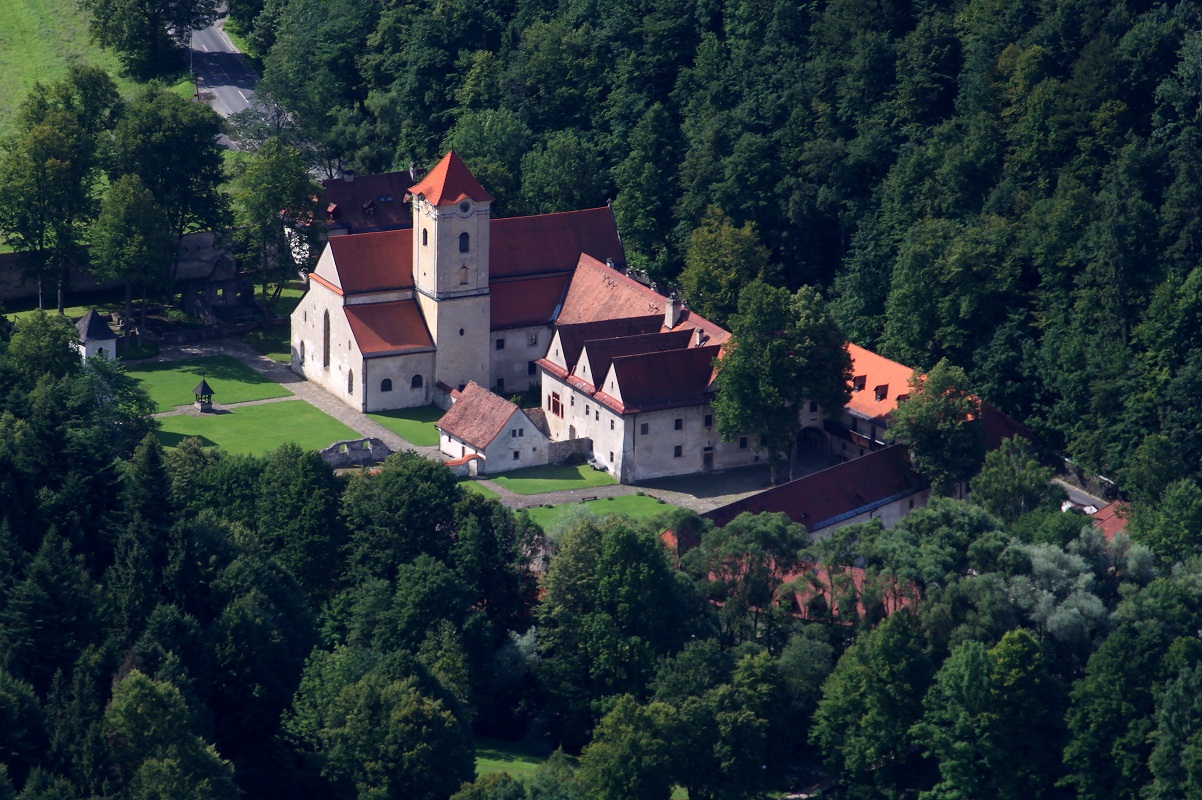
Church and chapter house

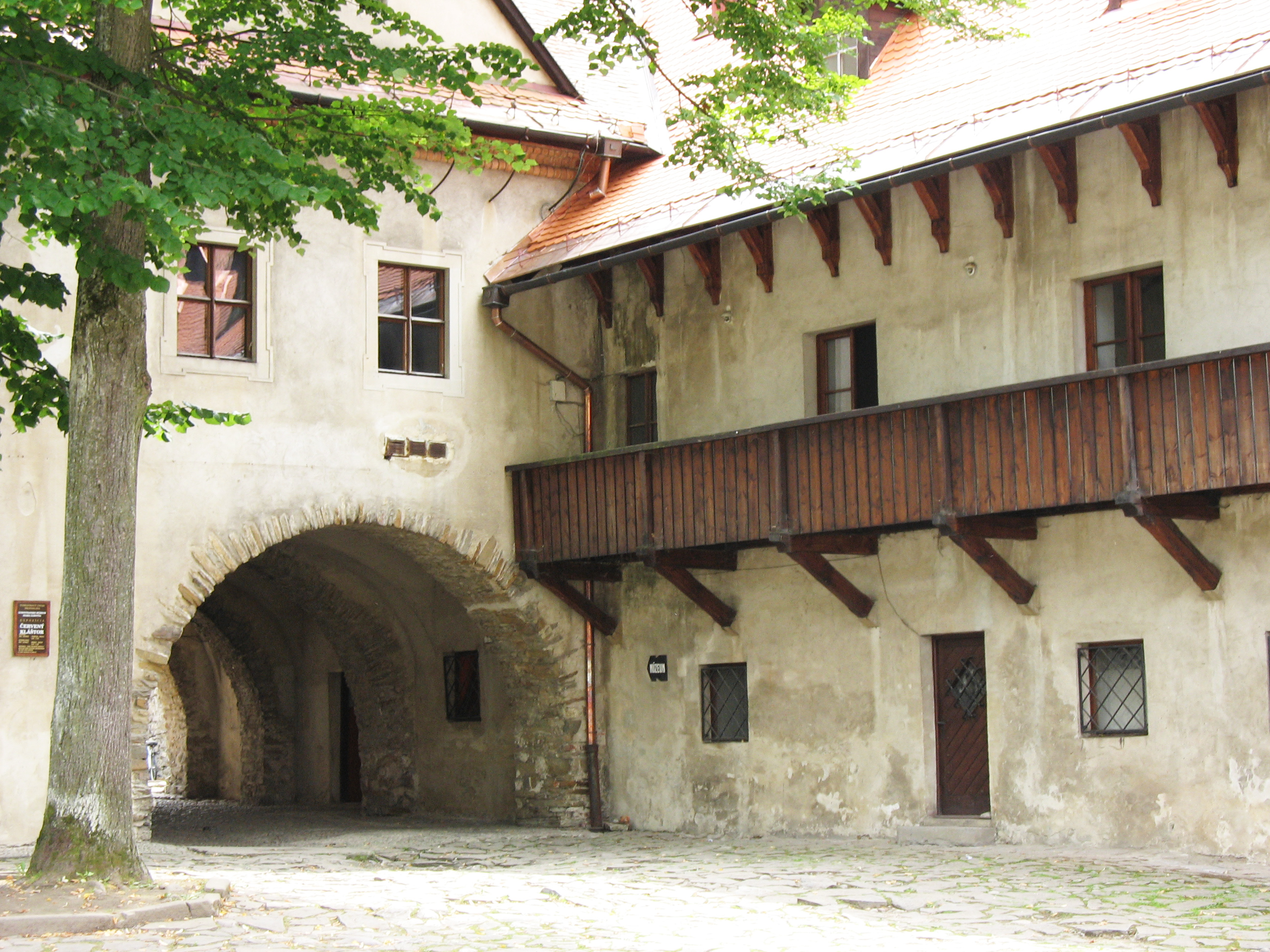
Court

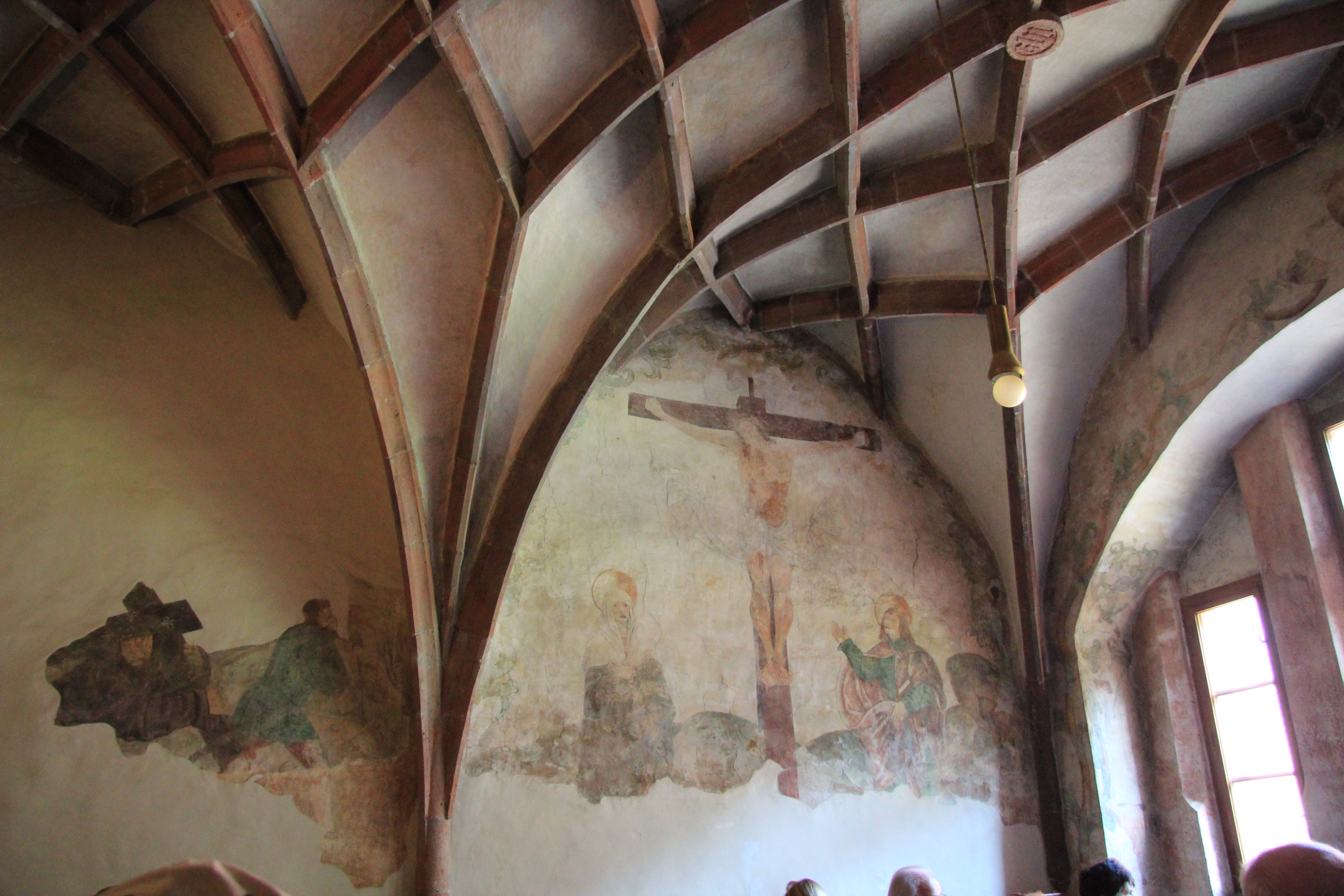
Chapter hall, vault ribs of brick

The monastery suffered a fire in 1907 and was heavily damaged during the Second World War, but after being rebuilt in 1956–66 it was opened again and serves as a museum.

== Museum ==
Today, the monastery remains in the ownership of the state and is open to visitors as a history a museum.

The first museum exhibit covering topics such as the monastery's history, period monastic life and period monastic botany and pharmacy, was established in 1966 by the East Slovak Museum in Košice, as a regional exhibit. This served as the culmination of early conservation and restoration efforts at the monastery that took place during the late 1950s and early 1960s.

Following a further phase of conservation and restoration works on the monastery in the 1980s and early 1990s, an enlarged monastery museum was reopened in 1993. Between 1999 and 2007, the monastery was administered by the Ľubovňa Museum in Stará Ľubovňa. Since 2008, the monastery has been administered by the Monuments Board of the Slovak Republic, which refurbished and expanded the existing exhibits.
