= Dolná Mičiná manor =

Historic site in Slovakia

- Dolná Mičiná, Banská Bystrica Region, Slovakia
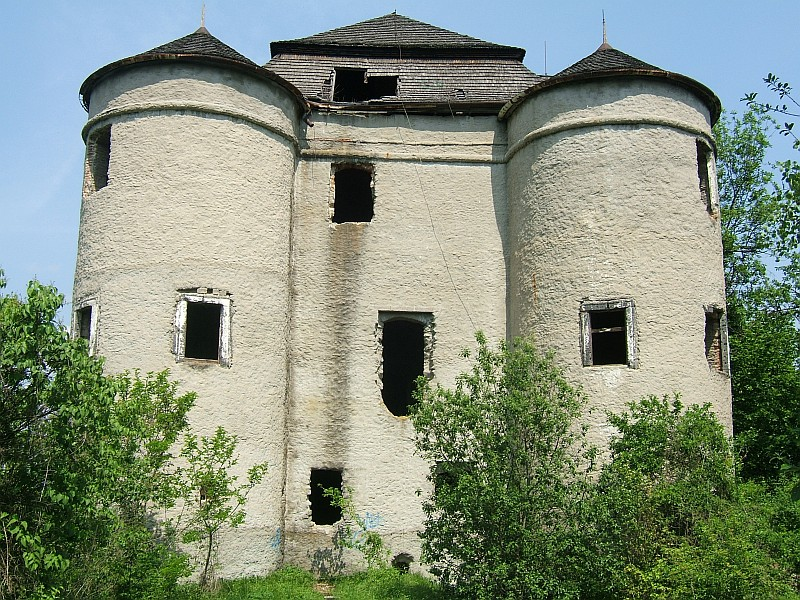

Site information
- Type: Fortress

Location
- Coordinates: 48.672222°N 19.223889°E

Dolná Mičiná manor is a ruined manor house located in Dolná Mičiná in the Banská Bystrica Region of Slovakia. It was originally a castle that was rebuilt into a Renaissance manor.

== History ==
The mansion was built in the second half of the 16th century on a Gothic foundation. It was probably a manor house, or rather a castle. In 1667, Tomáš Benický and his wife Katarína Mervaldová rebuilt it into its present form. The late Baroque modifications date from the end of the 18th century. Following World War II, the manor house was re-purposed as a grain and potato warehouse for the United Farmers' Cooperative in Dolná Mičina. After 1970, it was repaired and re-roofed. The most recent modifications are from the 1990s, when mainly the interior was modified. Following the modifications, the manor has been abandoned.

== Description ==
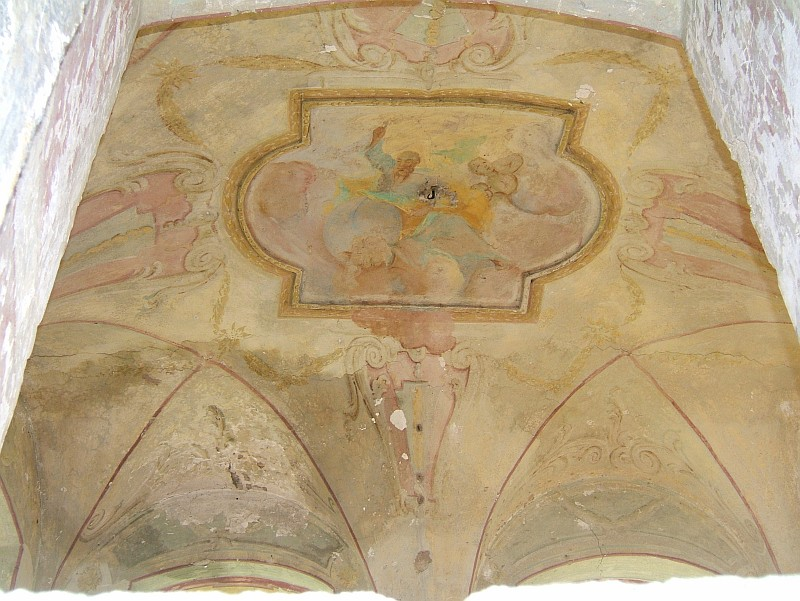
Fresco painting in the mansion

=== Interior ===
Renaissance and Baroque vaults with stucco patterns have been preserved. In the center of the layout is a vestibule with a barrel vault, from which the entrances to the side living rooms lead.

=== Exterior ===
A two-storey block building with four corner round towers and an attached block tower with a staircase. On the main facade between the corner towers there is a two-flight staircase located in the loggia arcade, dated by an inscription board in a cartouche to 1667. On the loggia on the first floor there is a late Renaissance fireplace dated to the same year. It is set into the shell of the corner tower.

== See also ==
- List of castles in Slovakia
