= Strážky Manor =

Historic site in Slovakia

- Kaštieľ v Strážkach
- Spišská Belá, Prešov Region, Slovakia
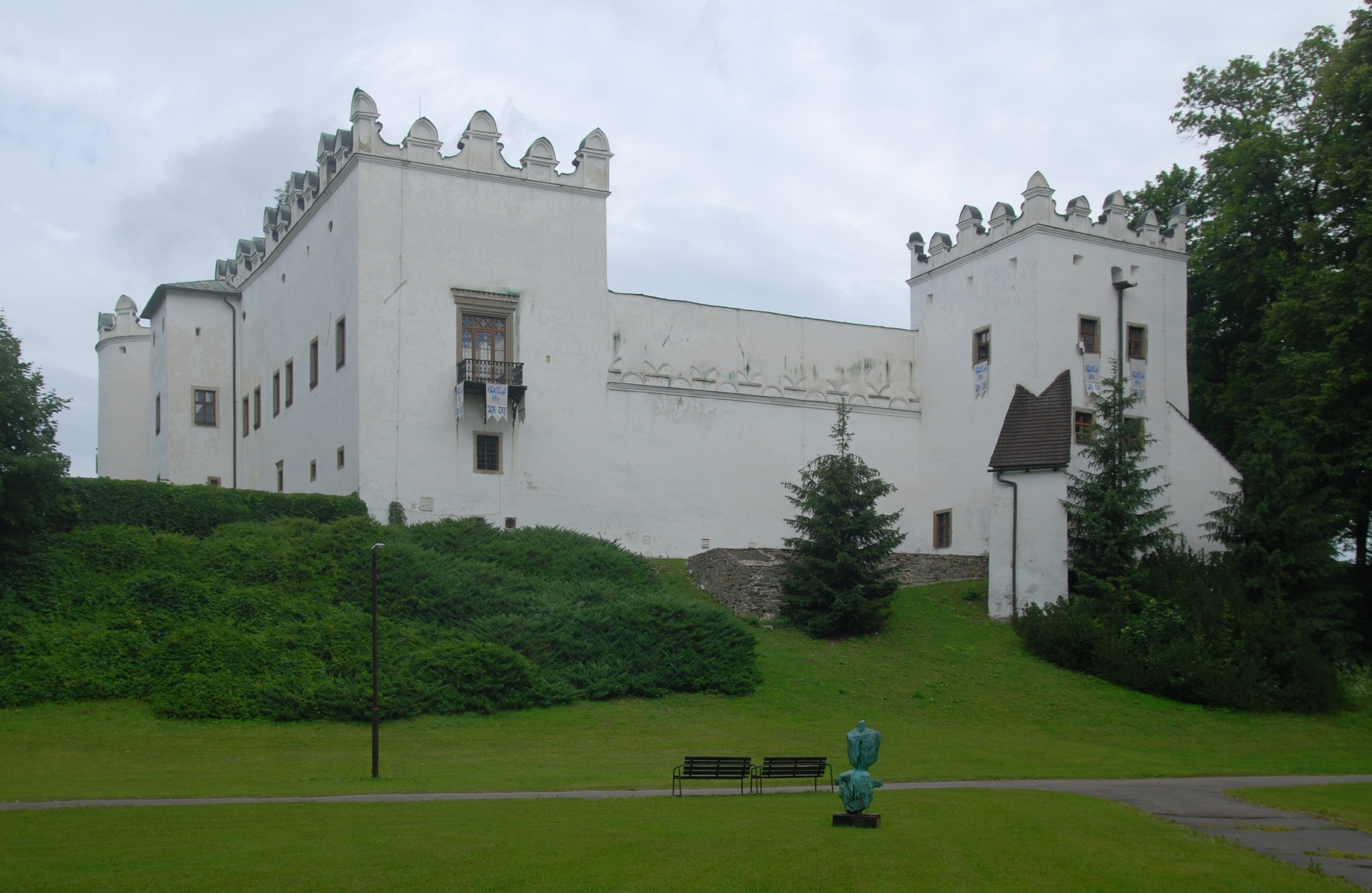
- The manor as seen from the park

Site information
- Type: Manor

Location
- Coordinates: 49.17203°N 20.454067°E

Strážky Manor (Slovak: Kaštieľ v Strážky; also referred to as a castle) is a national cultural monument located in the town of Spišská Belá, in the local district of Strážky in eastern Slovakia. The manor is considered an important piece of Renaissance architecture in Slovakia. It was declared a cultural monument together with the adjacent park on October 30, 1963 under the number ÚZPF 983.

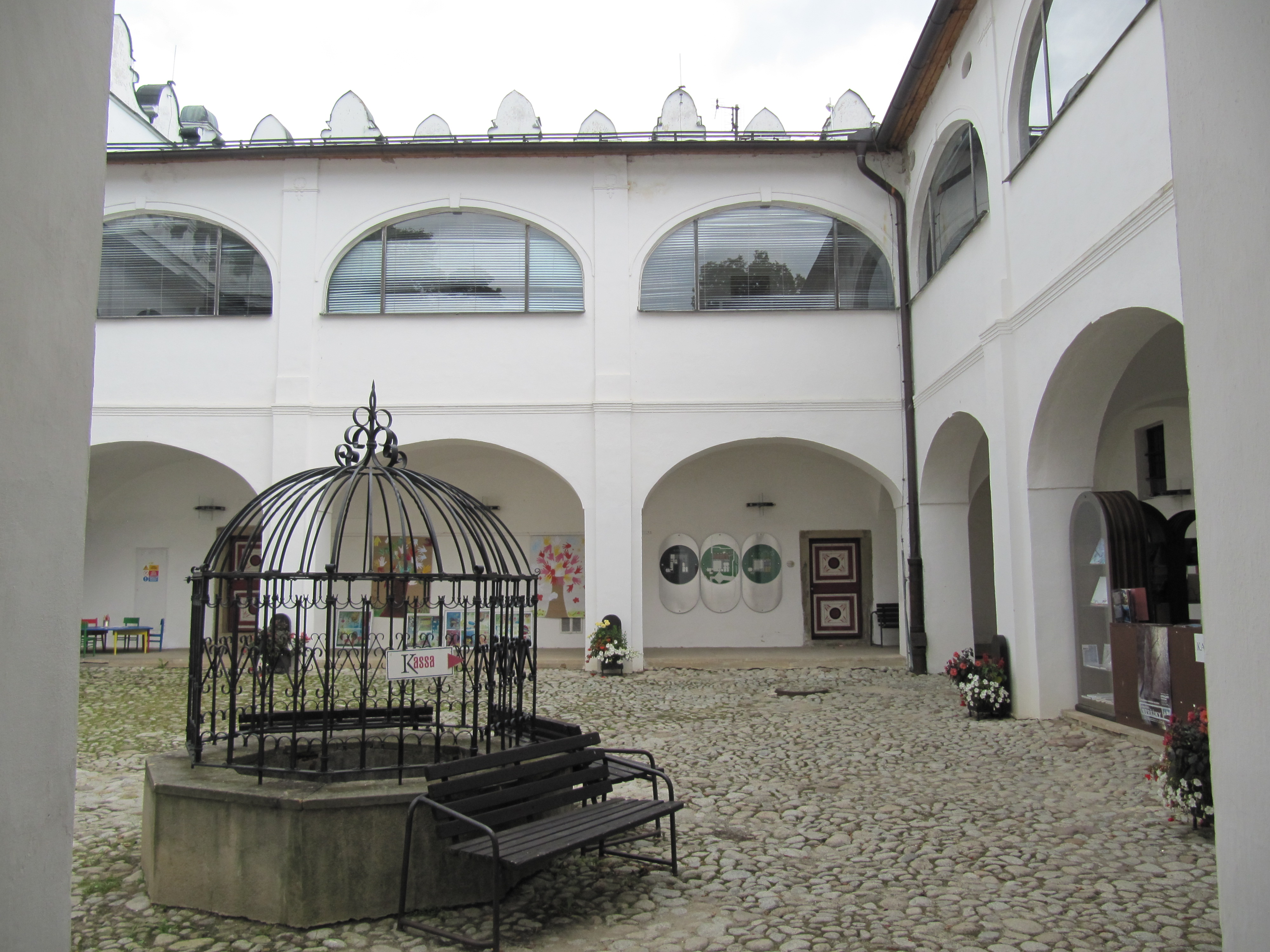
Inside the manor

Nowadays, the castle and its park belong to the Slovak National Gallery in Bratislava, which houses four permanent exhibitions.

== History ==
Originally built in the 12th and 13th centuries to protect Hungary's borders against Poland, the manor likely contained a fortress, monastery, and castle, though archaeological evidence only confirms a Late Gothic residence from the late 15th century. The Berzeviczy family built the earliest documented building, which was expanded and reinforced over centuries, mostly by the Horváth-Stansith family in the 16th and 17th centuries, who transformed it into a Renaissance mansion with defensive features. In 1584, Horvath Stansith de Gradecz founded a higher Protestant school for the nobility in the manor, which provided access to university studies and qualified students for public office. Following a fire in the early 18th century, and also due to the Counter-Reformation, the school was closed in 1711.

The mansion experienced significant modifications, fires, and renovations through the centuries, including Baroque and Romantic styles. It was owned by various families until the 20th century, with the last owner being baroness Margita Czóbel. During and after WWII, the mansion suffered neglect, damage, and partial loss of interior elements. Extensive archaeological and restoration work began in the 1960s and continued into the 1990s, resulting in the mansion's opening to the public in 1991. In its recent years, it holds the Slovak National Gallery, featuring exhibitions mainly focused on László Mednyánszky, regional art, and historical collections.

== Library ==
The manor also includes a library that was established in the late 16th century. Over 400 years, it has grown to include around 8,500 volumes, magazines, and maps. The library was linked to the founding of a humanistic grammar school for Spiš nobility in the family's manor house at the end of the 16th century.

== See also ==
- List of castles in Slovakia
