= Breznica Castle =

Castle ruins in Slovakia

Coordinates: 48.3784°N 18.6277°E

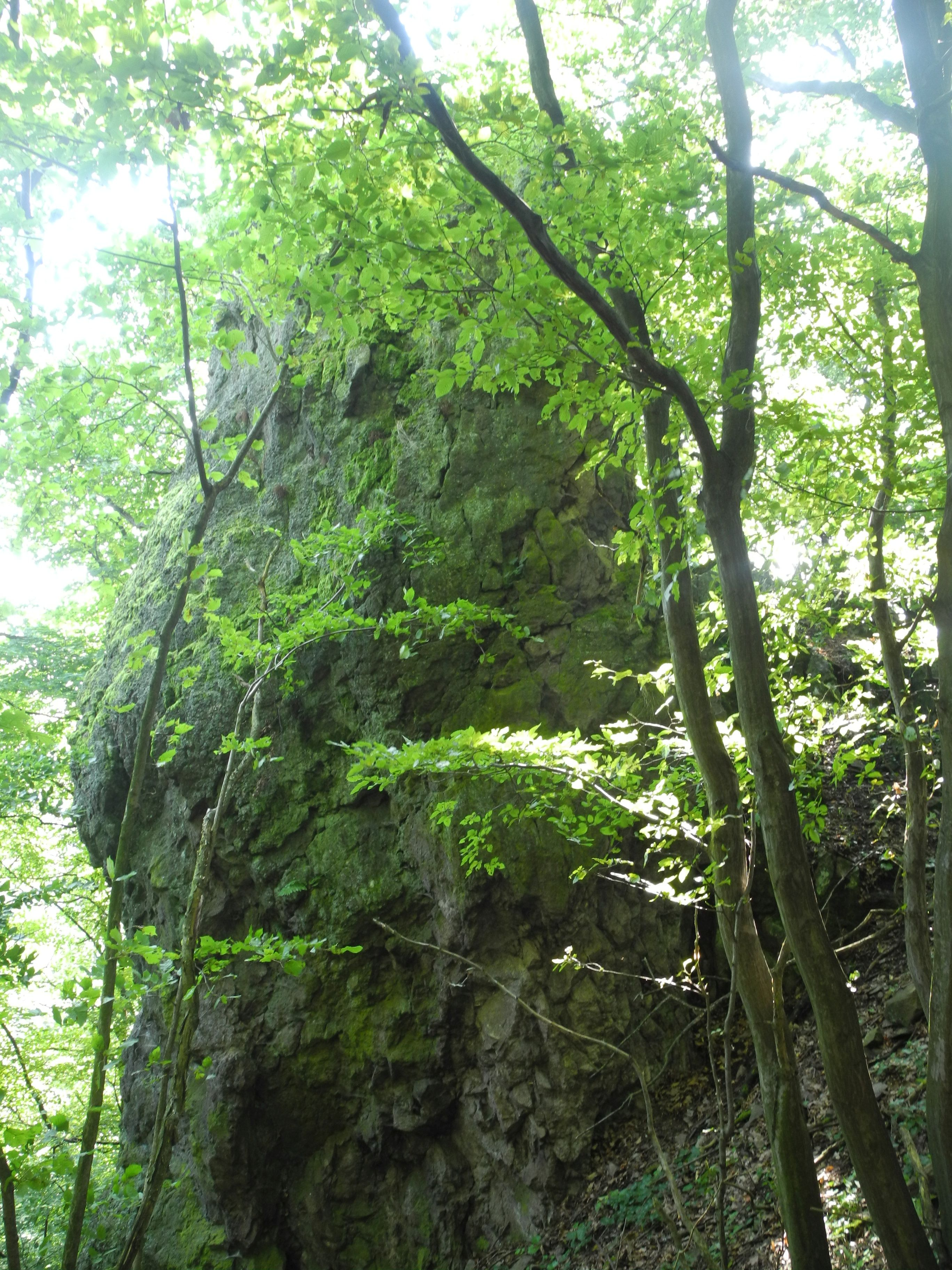
Remains of the castle

Breznica (also known as Breznica Castle, Berzenche, Berzentehe or Berzencze) is the ruins of a castle near the village of Tekovská Breznica in the Banská Bystrica Region of Slovakia.

The castle is suggested to be first mentioned in the years between 1273-76. Breznica castle was built before the Tatar invasion by Archbishop of Esztergom. Shortly after its reconstruction in 1423 into a Gothic fortress it was taken by John Jiskra of Brandýs's Hussites and later in 1471 by the Polish king Casimir. The castle was destroyed after 1732, being used as a source of building material.

== History ==
The construction date of the castle is debated among historians. Some suggests it was built around 1240, possibly by the Archbishop of Esztergom or the Benedictines, with the village and castle existing before the Mongol invasion. After the invasion, the population of the area was greatly reduced and only the castle of Breznica remained. The first reliable record of Breznica Castle is from 1311, with E. Fügedi estimating its construction between 1283 and 1311. In the early 14th century, the castle became the property of the Hungarian oligarch Matthew III Csák, who used military tactics to seize it, but it was quickly repaired and still considered significant in 1313. After Csák’s death in 1321, the castle reverted to the Archbishop of Esztergom and later changed hands, including falling under the Count of Comoros in 1351. Property disputes and neglect led to the castle being referred to as "damaged" by 1411.

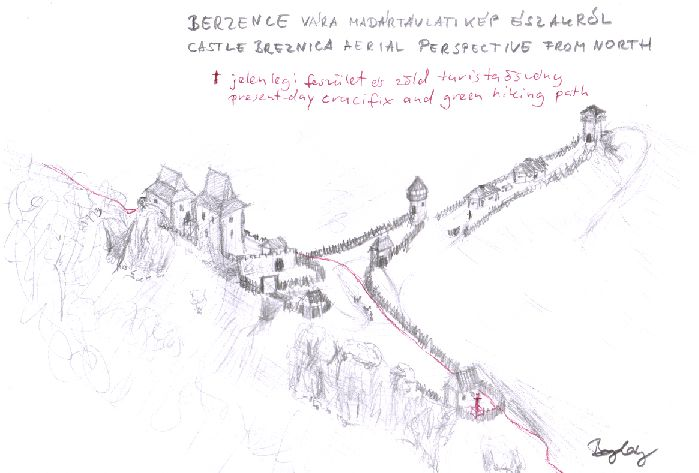
Illustration of what the castle might have looked like

After King Albrecht II of Habsburg's death, the castle was occupied in 1441 by John Jiskra's mercenaries. Some sources suggest that Mikuláš Bodok, captain of Breznica, welcomed the Czechs into the castle in 1464 and participated in raiding the surrounding area. By 1468, the castle changed hands again, with Bartoš of Hertvikovce serving as castellan and later signing himself as "hetman of Brzeznica" in 1471. That same year, Polish troops under King Casimir captured the castle, along with others in the region.

By the late 15th and early 16th centuries, the castle likely fell into disrepair, possibly due to neglect or deliberate demolition by the king because of castellans' misconduct. By 1546, the castle no longer stood, as evidenced by plans to build a new castle on the site. In 1563, the remains of the old castle were probably used as a military outpost to guard against Turkish invasions. The castle reappeared briefly in 1577 during disputes over the village of Breznica, when it belonged to the Archbishop of Esztergom.

By 1647, after Turkish raids, the castle was no longer mentioned, and by 1660, it was likely still standing but damaged. Records suggest it survived until the early 18th century but was probably already ruined by then. Over time, stones from the castle were repurposed for local building projects, hastening its complete ruin.
