= Drienov =

Village and municipality in the Prešov District in Slovakia

- Municipality
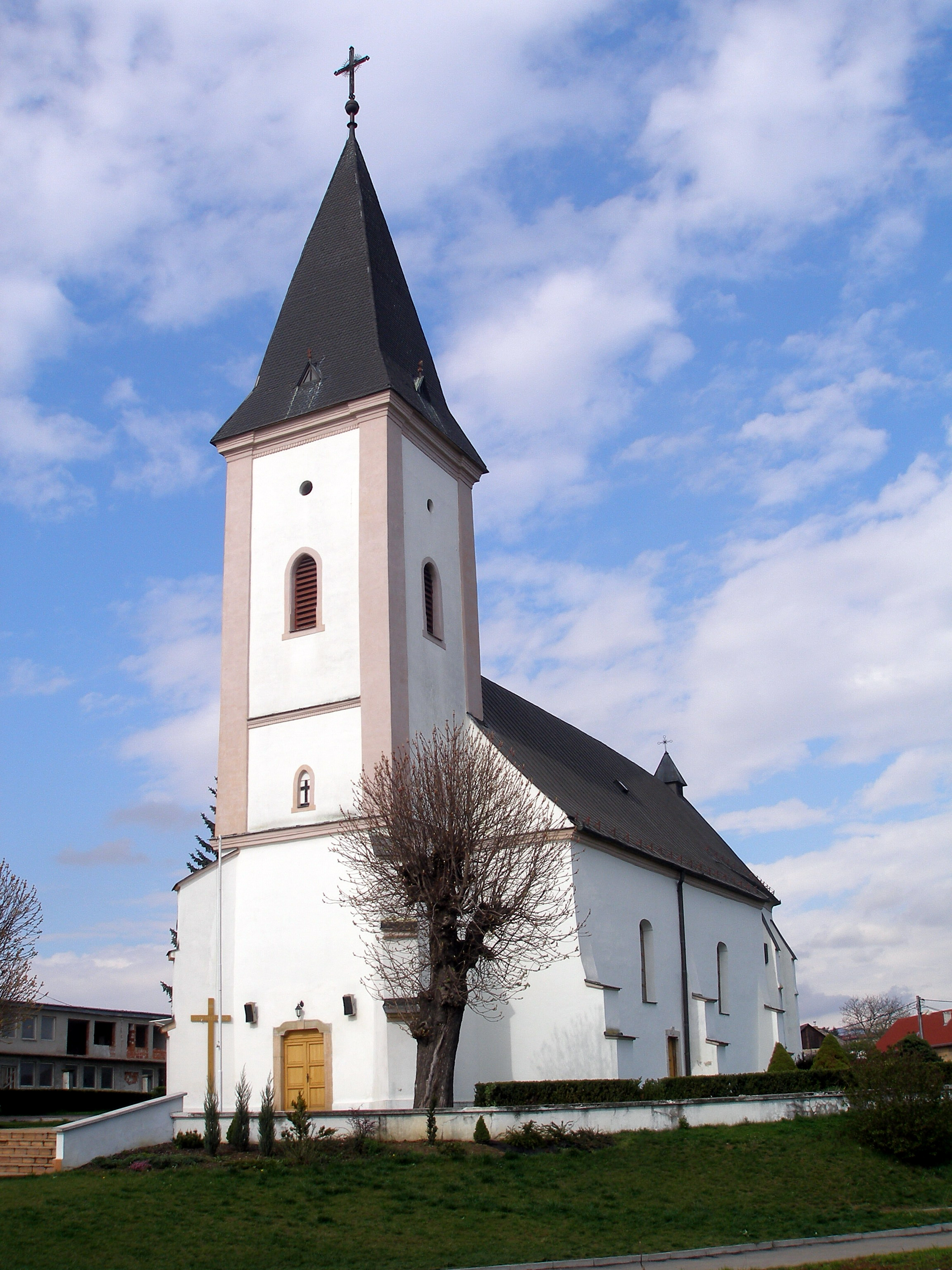

- Flag

- Location of Drienov in the Prešov Region Location of Drienov in Slovakia
- Coordinates: 48.87°N 21.27°E
- Country: Slovakia
- Region: Prešov Region
- District: Prešov District
- First mentioned: 1284

Area
  - Total: 20.29 km^{2} (7.83 sq mi)
- Elevation: 219 m (719 ft)

Population (2025)
  - Total: 2,275
- Time zone: UTC+1 (CET)
  - Summer (DST): UTC+2 (CEST)
- Postal code: 820 4
- Area code: +421 51
- Vehicle registration plate (until 2022): PO
- Website: www.drienov.sk

Drienov (Hungarian: Somos) is a village and municipality in the Prešov District in the Prešov Region of eastern Slovakia.

== History ==
The village was first mentioned in historical records in 1284.

== Geography ==
The municipality lies at an altitude of 219 metres (719 ft) and covers an area of 20.29 km^{2} (7.83 sq mi) (2025).

== Population ==
Population statistic (10 years)
| Year | 1995 | 2005 | 2015 | 2025 |
|---|---|---|---|---|
| Count | 1852 | 2100 | 2184 | 2275 |
| Difference | | +13.39% | +4% | +4.16% |

Population statistic
| Year | 2024 | 2025 |
|---|---|---|
| Count | 2275 | 2275 |
| Difference | | +0% |

It has a population of 2275 people (31 December 2025).

=== Ethnicity ===
Census 2021 (1+ %)
| Ethnicity | Number | Fraction |
|---|---|---|
| Slovak | 2119 | 94.68% |
| Romani | 200 | 8.93% |
| Not found out | 99 | 4.42% |
| Total | 2238 | |

In year 2021 was 2238 people by ethnicity 2119 as Slovak, 200 as Romani, 99 as Not found out, 12 as Rusyn, 7 as Czech, 6 as Hungarian, 4 as Russian, 3 as Other, 2 as Ukrainian, 2 as Bulgarian, 1 as Jewish, 1 as Serbian, 1 as Polish, 1 as Moravian and 1 as French.

Note on population: The difference values of population numbers in the table "Population statistic" and in the sections "Ethnicity" & "Religion" is caused by the use of various statistical methods.

=== Religion ===
Census 2021 (1+ %)
| Religion | Number | Fraction |
|---|---|---|
| Roman Catholic Church | 1569 | 70.11% |
| Greek Catholic Church | 289 | 12.91% |
| None | 206 | 9.2% |
| Not found out | 119 | 5.32% |
| Total | 2238 | |

In year 2021 was 2238 people by religion 1569 from Roman Catholic Church, 289 from Greek Catholic Church, 206 from None, 119 from Not found out, 13 from Evangelical Church, 10 from Eastern Orthodox Church, 8 from Christian Congregations in Slovakia, 5 from Other and not ascertained christian church, 5 from Ad hoc movements, 4 from Seventh-day Adventist Church, 3 from Calvinist Church, 2 from Buddhism, 2 from Apostolic Church, 1 from Other, 1 from United Methodist Church and 1 from Baptists Church.

== Notable people ==
- Peter and Ivanka († 1285/1287) Aba – noblemen and warriors against the second Mongol invasion into Hungary (1285 - 1287)
- Jolana Kirczová (* 1909 – † 1936) – art ceramic works
- Albín Korem (* 1941 – † 2006) – writer

== Genealogical resources ==
The records for genealogical research are available at the state archive "Statny Archiv in Kosice, Presov, Slovakia"

- Roman Catholic church records (births/marriages/deaths): 1743–1895 (parish A)
- Greek Catholic church records (births/marriages/deaths): 1773–1895 (parish B)
- Lutheran church records (births/marriages/deaths): 1787–1895 (parish B)

== See also ==
- List of municipalities and towns in Slovakia
