= Budimír =

Budimír Budamér
- Municipality
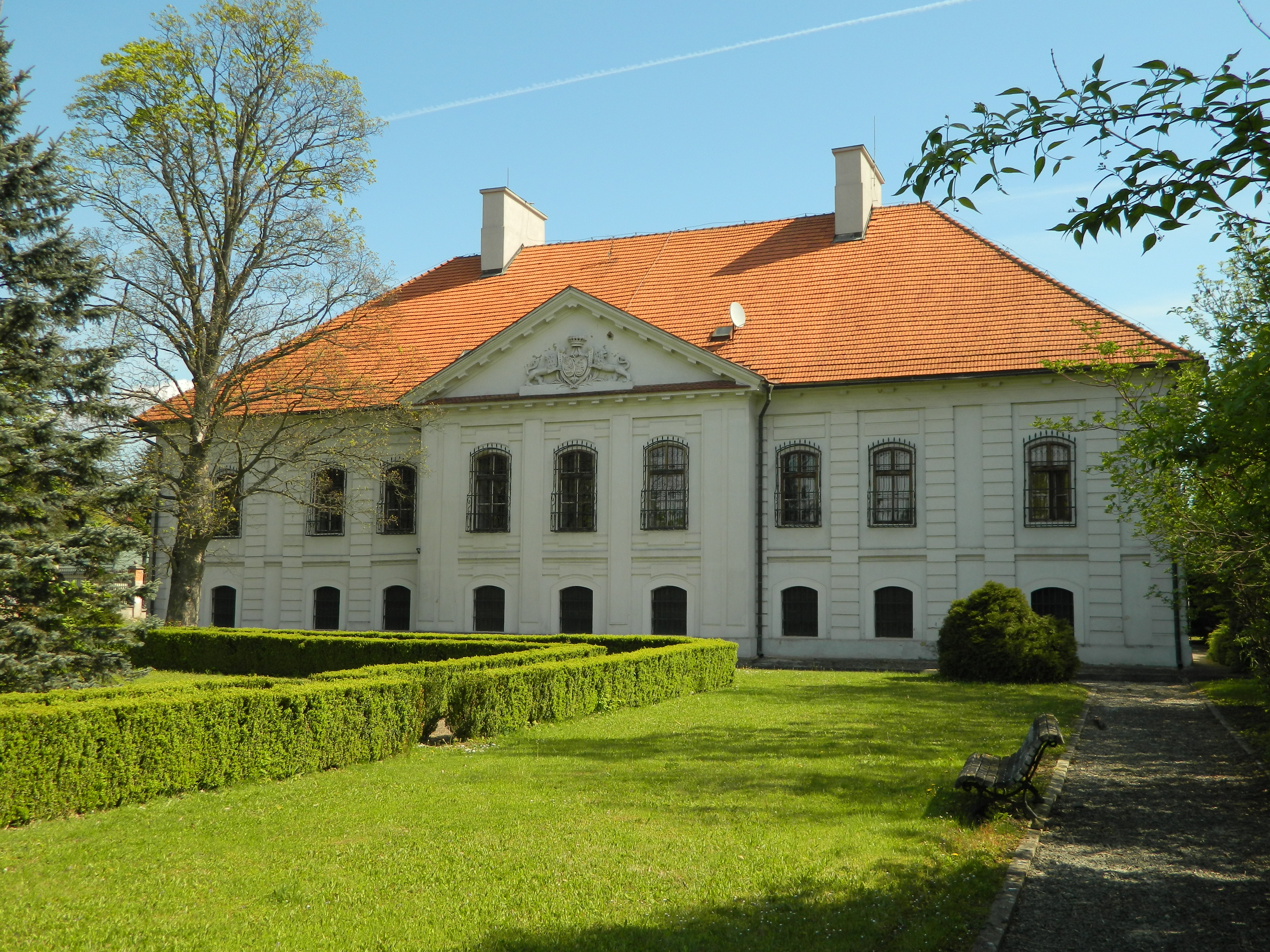
- Budimír Manor

- Flag

- Location of Budimír in the Košice Region Location of Budimír in Slovakia
- Coordinates: 48.80°N 21.30°E
- Country: Slovakia
- Region: Košice Region
- District: Košice-okolie District
- First mentioned: 1289

Government
  - Mayor: Vojtech Staňo

Area
  - Total: 6.92 km^{2} (2.67 sq mi)
- Elevation: 219 m (719 ft)

Population (2025)
  - Total: 1,419
- Time zone: UTC+1 (CET)
  - Summer (DST): UTC+2 (CEST)
- Postal code: 444 3
- Area code: +421 55
- Vehicle registration plate (until 2022): KS
- Website: www.obecbudimir.eu

Budimír (Hungarian: Budamér) is a village and municipality in Košice-okolie District in the Kosice Region of eastern Slovakia.

== History ==
Historically, the village was first mentioned in 1289.

== Geography ==
The municipality lies at an altitude of 219 metres (719 ft) and covers an area of 6.92 km^{2} (2.67 sq mi) (2025).

== Buildings ==
- Budimír Manor
- Florián Manor

== Population ==
Population statistic (10 years)
Year	1995	2005	2015	2025
Count	856	900	1145	1419
Difference		+5.14%	+27.22%	+23.93%

Population statistic
Year	2024	2025
Count	1397	1419
Difference		+1.57%

It has a population of 1419 people (31 December 2025).

=== Ethnicity ===
Census 2021 (1+ %)
Ethnicity	Number	Fraction
Slovak	1227	95.26%
Not found out	39	3.02%
Hungarian	20	1.55%
Rusyn	17	1.31%
Total	1288	

In year 2021 was 1288 people by ethnicity 1227 as Slovak, 39 as Not found out, 20 as Hungarian, 17 as Rusyn, 9 as Czech, 9 as Ukrainian, 4 as Polish, 4 as Other, 2 as Serbian, 2 as Romani, 2 as Russian, 2 as German and 1 as Italian.

Note on population: The difference values of population numbers in the table "Population statistic" and in the sections "Ethnicity" & "Religion" is caused by the use of various statistical methods.

=== Religion ===
Census 2021 (1+ %)
Religion	Number	Fraction
Roman Catholic Church	776	60.25%
None	178	13.82%
Evangelical Church	138	10.71%
Greek Catholic Church	95	7.38%
Not found out	47	3.65%
Calvinist Church	18	1.4%
Eastern Orthodox Church	14	1.09%
Total	1288	

In year 2021 was 1288 people by religion 776 from Roman Catholic Church, 178 from None, 138 from Evangelical Church, 95 from Greek Catholic Church, 47 from Not found out, 18 from Calvinist Church, 14 from Eastern Orthodox Church, 7 from Jehovah's Witnesses, 4 from Apostolic Church, 4 from Ad hoc movements, 3 from Buddhism, 1 from Christian Congregations in Slovakia, 1 from Other, 1 from Hinduism and 1 from United Methodist Church.

== Genealogical resources ==
The records for genealogical research are available at the state archive "Statny Archiv in Kosice, Slovakia"

- Roman Catholic church records (births/marriages/deaths): 1747-1896 (parish A)
- Greek Catholic church records (births/marriages/deaths): 1819-1898 (parish B)
- Lutheran church records (births/marriages/deaths): 1787-1895 (parish B)

== See also ==
- List of municipalities and towns in Slovakia
