= Budimír Manor =

Historic site in Slovakia

- Budimírsky kaštieľ
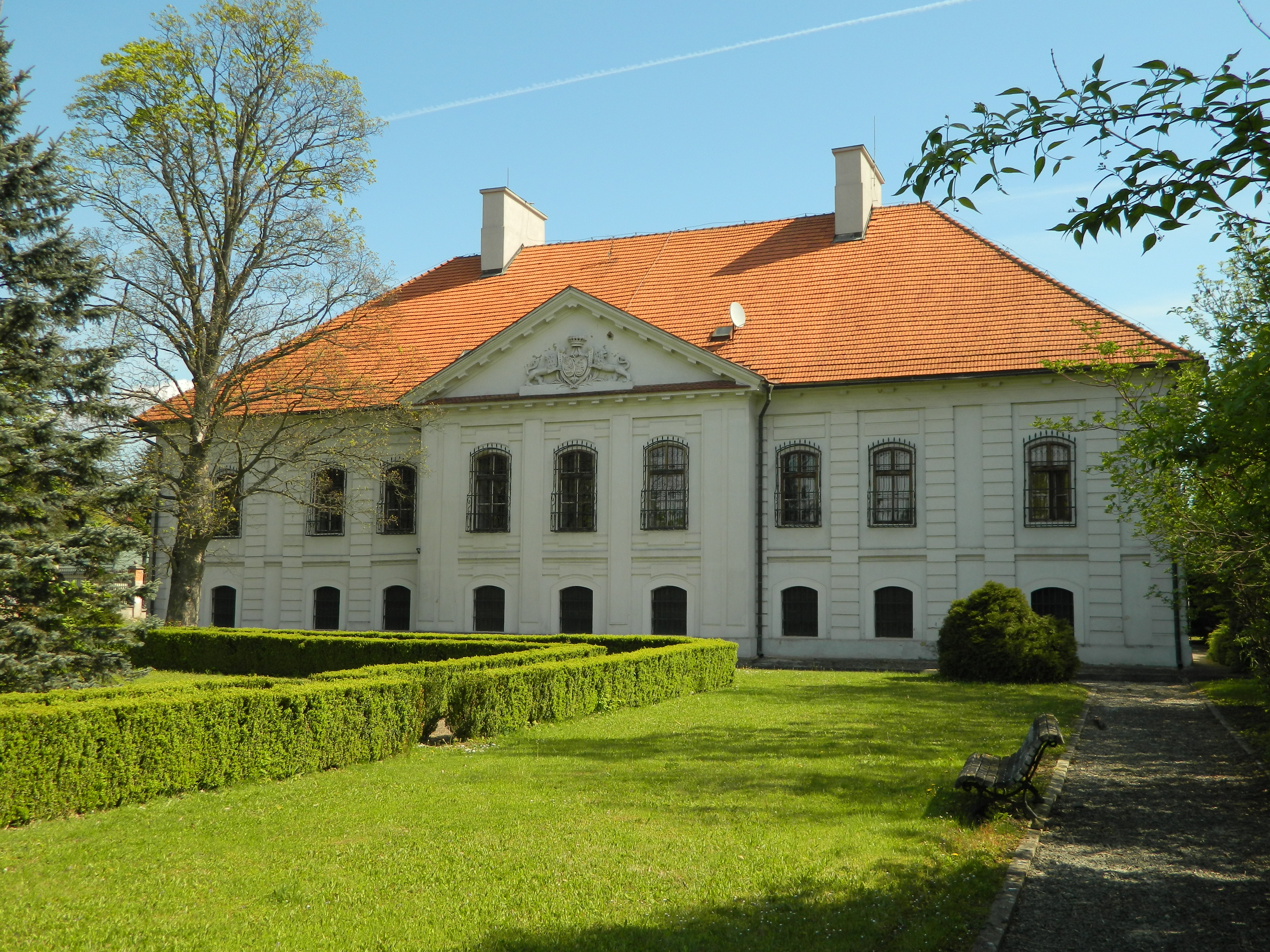

Site information
- Type: Castle

Location
- Coordinates: 48.79556°N 21.30667°E

Budimír Manor (Slovak: Budimírsky kaštieľ) is a manor house located in Budimír in the Košice Region of Slovakia.

== History ==
The Budimír castle, built in the 18th century in a classical style, was originally visible from the trade route to Košice. Originally serving as a noble residence, it later housed a school and was reconstructed in the 1980s. The building had various owners until 1985, part of it served the Technical Museum as a depository, part of it served the local school. The complete reconstruction of the building, including the park improvements, lasted five years and the mansion was opened to the public in 1990. The original plan included a permanent exhibition, but practice required a change in this concept. The depositories of the Slovak Technical Museum are located in part of the basement. Small chamber exhibitions are installed in the exhibition spaces at shorter or longer intervals. In addition to exhibitions focused on the history of technology, there are also exhibitions dedicated to history and art. Exhibitions from the collections of private entrepreneurs - owners of antiques, as well as private collectors, also contribute to the program.

== Exterior ==
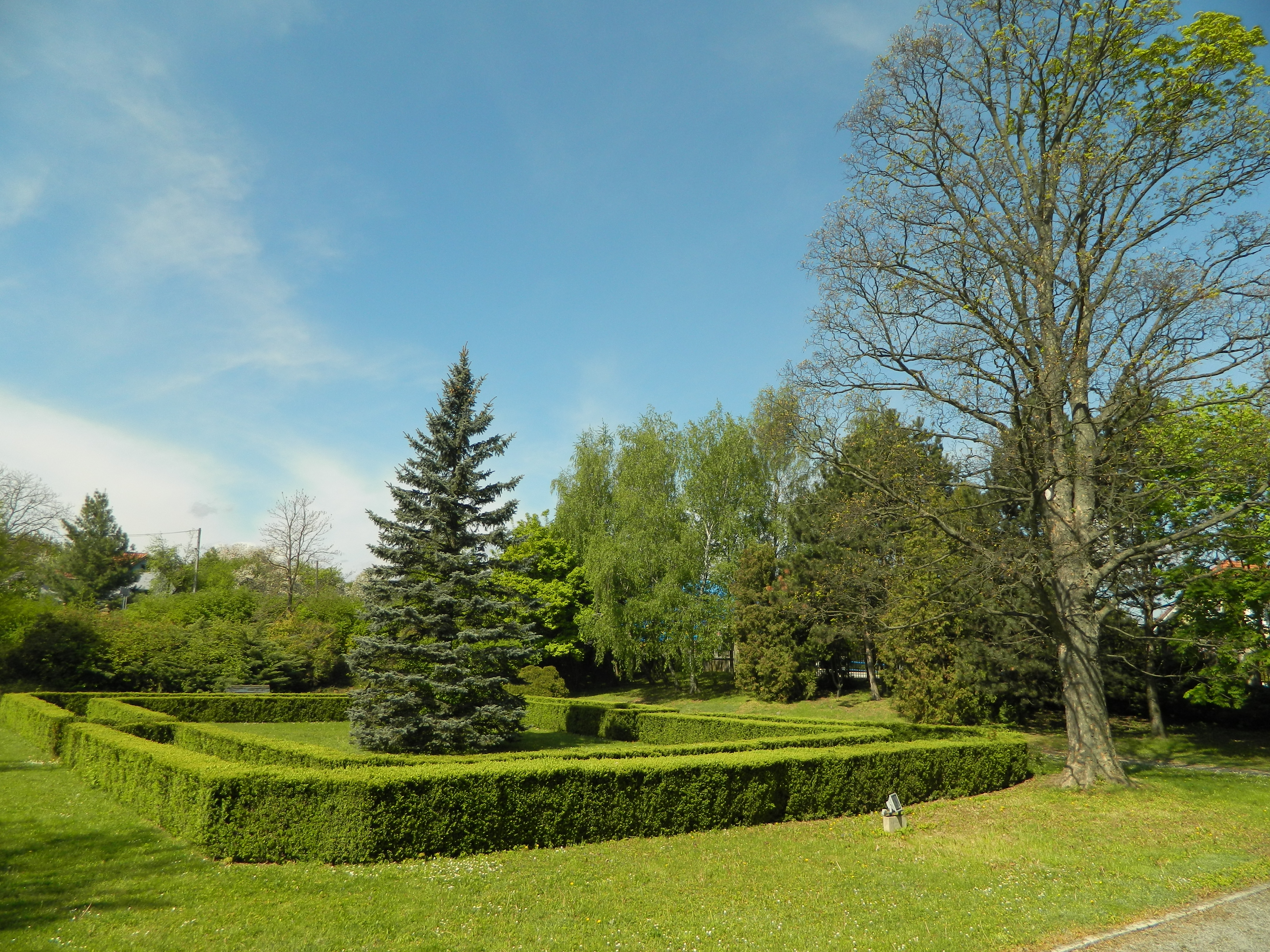
Gardens of the manor

Budimír Manor is a classicist Theresian building from the second third of the 18th century with later interior renovations. The two-storey, three-section block building with a coat of arms on the facade served as the manor house of the Ujházy branch. The rooms have barrel vaults and cloister vaults, and the former state room has an Empire mural. The building is set in a new French park and enclosed by a new fence in the classicist style.

== See also ==
- List of castles in Slovakia
