= Magna Via (route) =

Former trade route in Austria-Hungary

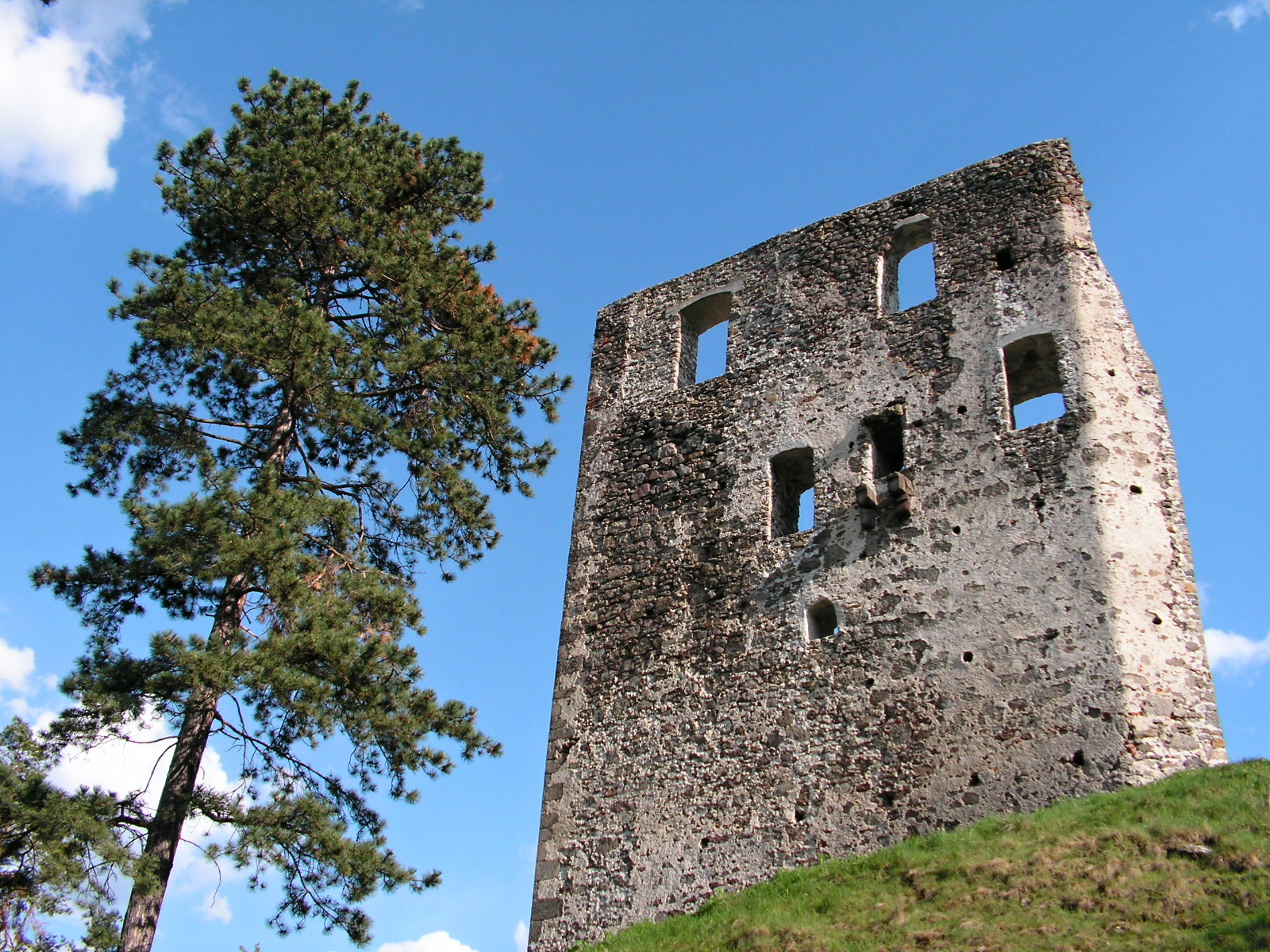
The Dobrá Niva Castle was used to defend the part of the route near Zvolen.

The Magna Via (also referred to as the Via Magna) was an important road in the former Austro-Hungarian Empire, running through present-day Austria, Slovakia, Hungary, Romania and Ukraine. It was used for the transport of people and mail.

== History ==
The occupation of the southern regions of the monarchy by the troops of the Turkish Suleiman the Magnificent after the Battle of Mohács in 1526 caused the severance of the connection between Vienna and the central Slovak mining towns and other eastern territories. The complex situation in the monarchy (especially the power struggle between the Austrian Ferdinand I and the Transylvanian Duke John Sigismund Zápolya and the devastating invasions of the Turkish troops) led to many changes and, in the area of transport connections, to the relocation of the main routes to areas that were more distant and safer.

On the orders of the monarch Ferdinand I (1526-1564), Matej Taxis began to build a new postal and transport connection. In 1550, one of the longest postal and transport routes was completed along four routes (from Vienna to Lviv, Constantinople, Kronstadt and to Karlstadt), which had a total of 56 postal stations. The new royal postal route led from Vienna through Bratislava, Trnava, Hlohovec, Topoľčany, Prievidza, Martin, Ružomberok, Lučivná, Levoča, Prešov, Michalovce to Sobrance and further to Mukačev, Debrecen and Sibiu.

In the 18th century, other postal transfer stations were completed and the Magna Via branched out and networked to regions that were developing economically. Individual postal stations were originally two postal miles (about 15 km) apart and included catering, accommodation and farm buildings for stabling draft and riding horses. The post office was managed by a magister postae, to whom postilions were subordinate. They carried out the transport themselves, originally on horses and later on mail carriages. They announced their arrival with a trumpet, which remains a symbol of the post office nowadays.
