= Podbranč =

- Municipality
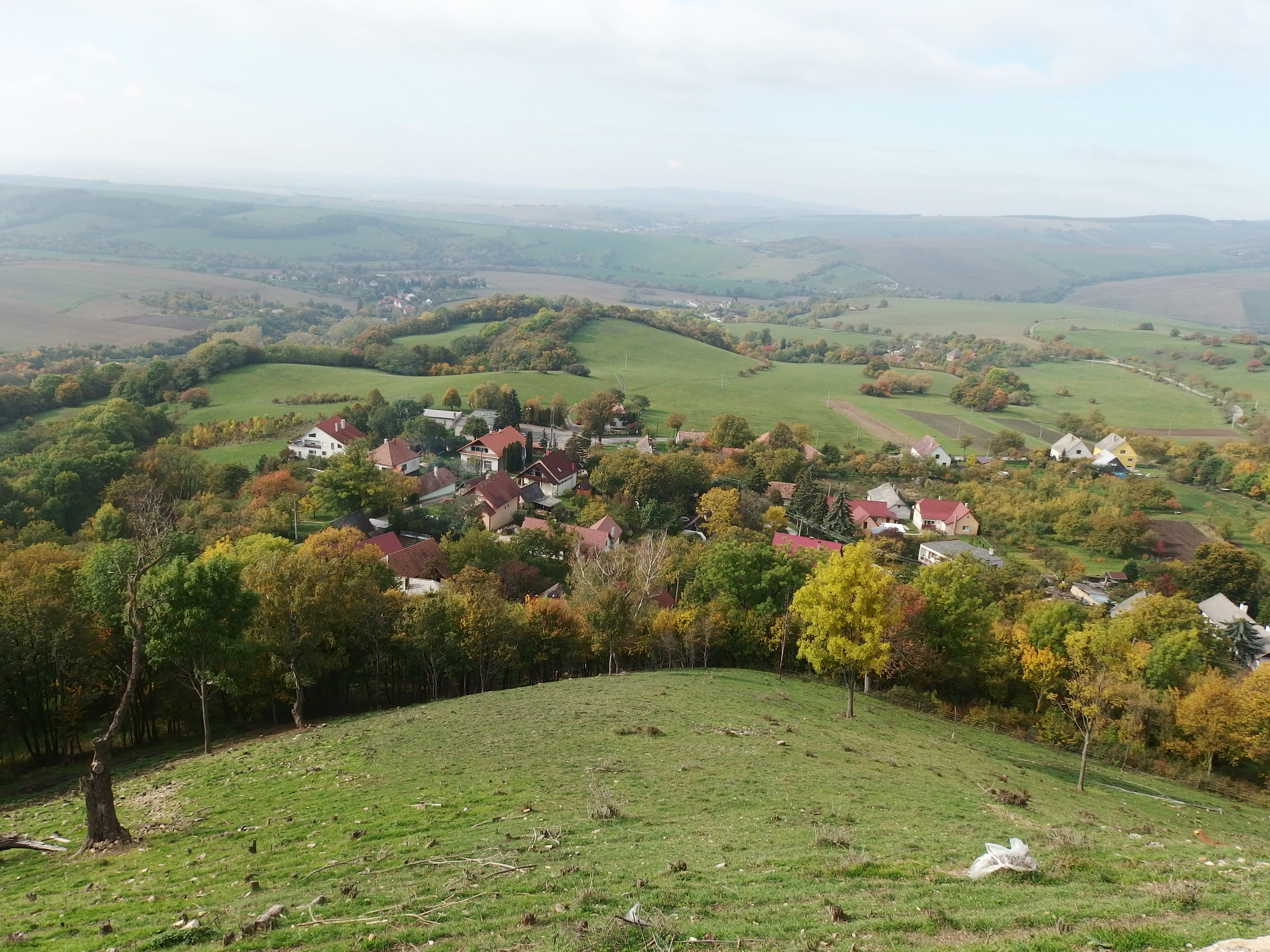

- Location of Podbranč in the Trnava Region Location of Podbranč in Slovakia
- Coordinates: 48.73°N 17.47°E
- Country: Slovakia
- Region: Trnava Region
- District: Senica District
- First mentioned: 1297

Area
  - Total: 14.13 km^{2} (5.46 sq mi)
- Elevation: 288 m (945 ft)

Population (2025)
  - Total: 593
- Time zone: UTC+1 (CET)
  - Summer (DST): UTC+2 (CEST)
- Postal code: 906 41
- Area code: +421 34
- Vehicle registration plate (until 2022): SE
- Website: www.podbranc.sk

Podbranč (Hungarian: Berencsváralja) is a village and municipality in Senica District in the Trnava Region of western Slovakia.

== History ==
In historical records the village was first mentioned in 1297.

== Geography ==
The municipality lies at an altitude of 288 metres (945 ft) and covers an area of 14.13 km^{2} (5.46 sq mi) (2025).

== Population ==
Population statistic (10 years)
Year	1995	2005	2015	2025
Count	735	639	615	593
Difference		−13.06%	−3.75%	−3.57%

Population statistic
Year	2024	2025
Count	606	593
Difference		−2.14%

It has a population of 593 people (31 December 2025).

=== Ethnicity ===
Census 2021 (1+ %)
Ethnicity	Number	Fraction
Slovak	596	95.97%
Not found out	21	3.38%
Total	621	

In year 2021 was 621 people by ethnicity 596 as Slovak, 21 as Not found out, 6 as Czech, 2 as German, 2 as Other and 1 as Jewish.

Note on population: The difference values of population numbers in the table "Population statistic" and in the sections "Ethnicity" & "Religion" is caused by the use of various statistical methods.

=== Religion ===
Census 2021 (1+ %)
Religion	Number	Fraction
Evangelical Church	399	64.25%
None	153	24.64%
Roman Catholic Church	36	5.8%
Not found out	23	3.7%
Total	621	

In year 2021 was 621 people by religion 399 from Evangelical Church, 153 from None, 36 from Roman Catholic Church, 23 from Not found out, 3 from United Methodist Church, 2 from Jehovah's Witnesses, 2 from Other, 2 from Ad hoc movements and 1 from Buddhism.
