= Haniska, Prešov District =

Village and municipality in Slovakia

Haniska
- Municipality
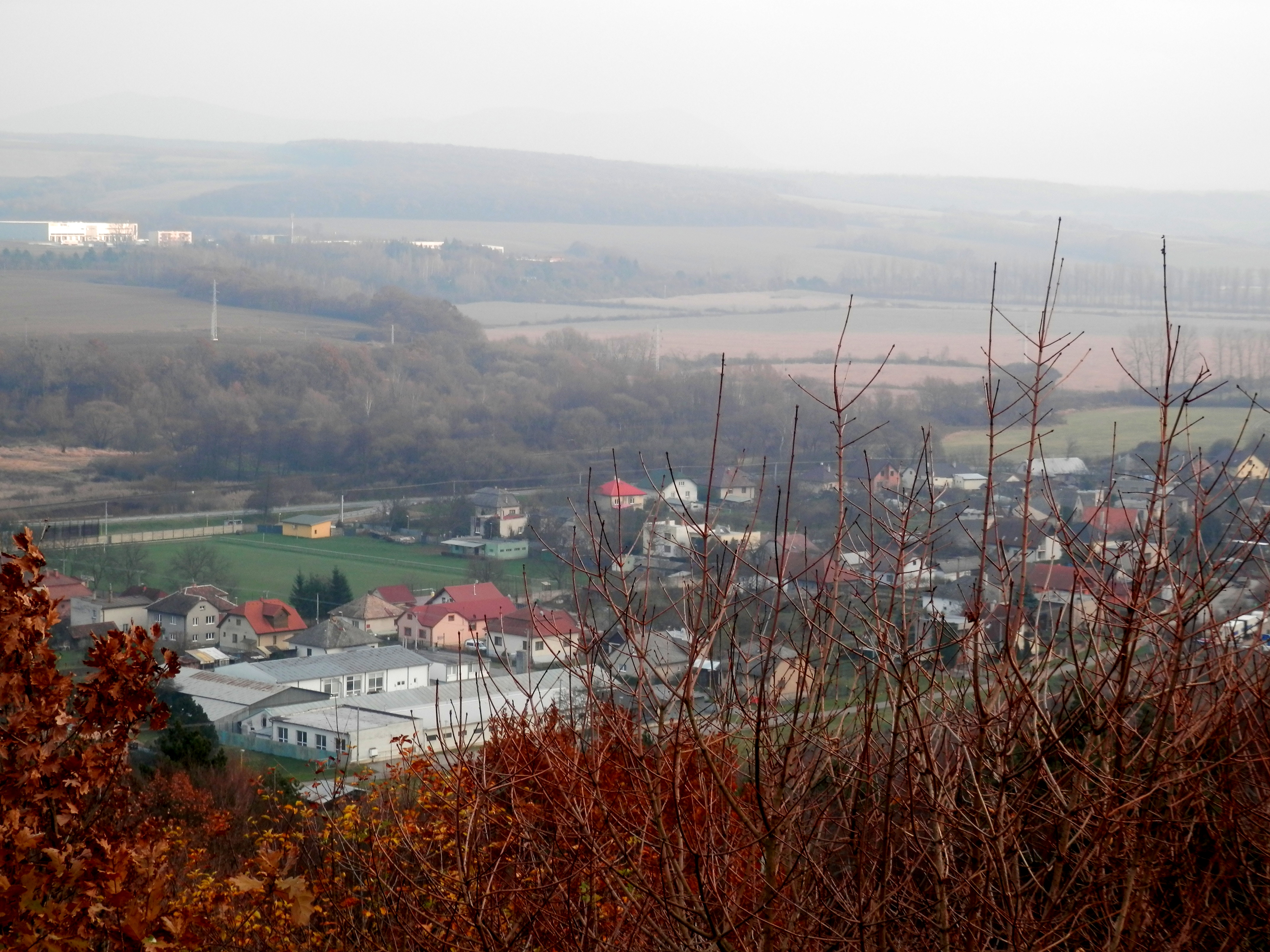

- Flag

- Location of Haniska in the Prešov Region Location of Haniska in Slovakia
- Coordinates: 48.96°N 21.24°E
- Country: Slovakia
- Region: Prešov Region
- District: Prešov District
- First mentioned: 1288

Area
  - Total: 1.90 km^{2} (0.73 sq mi)
- Elevation: 241 m (791 ft)

Population (2025)
  - Total: 738
- Time zone: UTC+1 (CET)
  - Summer (DST): UTC+2 (CEST)
- Postal code: 800 1
- Area code: +421 51
- Vehicle registration plate (until 2022): PO
- Website: www.obechaniska.sk

Haniska (Hungarian: Eperjesenyicke) is a village and municipality in the Prešov District, Prešov Region in eastern Slovakia.

== History ==
In historical records, the village was first mentioned in 1288.

== Geography ==
The municipality lies at an altitude of 241 metres (791 ft) and covers an area of 1.90 km^{2} (0.73 sq mi) (2025).

== Population ==
Population statistic (10 years)
Year	1995	2005	2015	2025
Count	525	601	679	738
Difference		+14.47%	+12.97%	+8.68%

Population statistic
Year	2024	2025
Count	745	738
Difference		−0.93%

It has a population of 738 people (31 December 2025).

=== Ethnicity ===
Census 2021 (1+ %)
Ethnicity	Number	Fraction
Slovak	696	94.18%
Not found out	31	4.19%
Ukrainian	10	1.35%
Rusyn	9	1.21%
Total	739	

In year 2021 was 739 people by ethnicity 696 as Slovak, 31 as Not found out, 10 as Ukrainian, 9 as Rusyn, 7 as Romani, 3 as Irish, 3 as Other, 2 as Czech, 2 as Polish, 1 as Serbian and 1 as Hungarian.

Note on population: The difference values of population numbers in the table "Population statistic" and in the sections "Ethnicity" & "Religion" is caused by the use of various statistical methods.

=== Religion ===
Census 2021 (1+ %)
Religion	Number	Fraction
Roman Catholic Church	495	66.98%
None	106	14.34%
Evangelical Church	44	5.95%
Greek Catholic Church	39	5.28%
Not found out	30	4.06%
Eastern Orthodox Church	9	1.22%
Total	739	

In year 2021 was 739 people by religion 495 from Roman Catholic Church, 106 from None, 44 from Evangelical Church, 39 from Greek Catholic Church, 30 from Not found out, 9 from Eastern Orthodox Church, 6 from Ad hoc movements, 3 from Calvinist Church, 2 from Other and not ascertained christian church, 1 from Old Catholic Church, 1 from Paganism and natural spirituality, 1 from Other, 1 from Buddhism and 1 from Baptists Church.

== Points of interest ==
At Haniska, there is a medium wave broadcasting station, which uses a 220-meter-tall (720 ft) guyed mast.

== Genealogical resources ==
The records for genealogical research are available at the state archive "Statny Archiv in Presov, Slovakia"

- Roman Catholic church records (births/marriages/deaths): 1720–1896 (parish B)
- Greek Catholic church records (births/marriages/deaths): 1792–1895 (parish B)
- Lutheran church records (births/marriages/deaths): 1704–1895 (parish B)

== See also ==
- List of municipalities and towns in Slovakia
