= Cejkov =

Village and municipality in Slovakia

Cejkov Céke
- Municipality
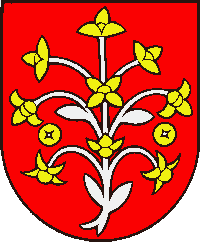
- Flag Coat of arms

- Location of Cejkov in the Košice Region Location of Cejkov in Slovakia
- Coordinates: 48.47°N 21.77°E
- Country: Slovakia
- Region: Košice Region
- District: Trebišov District
- First mentioned: 1381

Area
  - Total: 20.84 km^{2} (8.05 sq mi)
- Elevation: 161 m (528 ft)

Population (2025)
  - Total: 1,123
- Time zone: UTC+1 (CET)
  - Summer (DST): UTC+2 (CEST)
- Postal code: 760 5
- Area code: +421 56
- Vehicle registration plate (until 2022): TV
- Website: cejkov.sk

Cejkov (Slovak pronunciation: [ˈtsejkɔw]; Hungarian: Céke) is a village and municipality in the Trebišov District in the Košice Region of eastern Slovakia.

== History ==
In historical records the village was first mentioned in 1381.

== Geography ==
The municipality lies at an altitude of 161 metres (528 ft) and covers an area of 20.84 km^{2} (8.05 sq mi) (2025).

== Population ==
Population statistic (10 years)
Year	1995	2005	2015	2025
Count	1220	1202	1176	1123
Difference		−1.47%	−2.16%	−4.50%

Population statistic
Year	2024	2025
Count	1127	1123
Difference		−0.35%

It has a population of 1123 people (31 December 2025).

=== Ethnicity ===
Census 2021 (1+ %)
Ethnicity	Number	Fraction
Slovak	1133	96.75%
Not found out	25	2.13%
Total	1171	

In year 2021 was 1171 people by ethnicity 1133 as Slovak, 25 as Not found out, 11 as Hungarian, 9 as Rusyn, 8 as Czech, 5 as Romani, 1 as Ukrainian and 1 as German.

Note on population: The difference values of population numbers in the table "Population statistic" and in the sections "Ethnicity" & "Religion" is caused by the use of various statistical methods.

=== Religion ===
Census 2021 (1+ %)
Religion	Number	Fraction
Roman Catholic Church	660	56.36%
None	210	17.93%
Greek Catholic Church	203	17.34%
Eastern Orthodox Church	56	4.78%
Not found out	18	1.54%
Calvinist Church	13	1.11%
Total	1171	

In year 2021 was 1171 people by religion 660 from Roman Catholic Church, 210 from None, 203 from Greek Catholic Church, 56 from Eastern Orthodox Church, 18 from Not found out, 13 from Calvinist Church, 5 from Evangelical Church, 3 from Jehovah's Witnesses, 1 from Christian Congregations in Slovakia, 1 from Other and 1 from Apostolic Church.

== Notable people ==
- Ján Pivarník, football player and coach

== Facilities ==
The village has a public library, a gymnasium and a football pitch. It also has a doctors surgery.

== Genealogical resources ==
The records for genealogical research are available at the state archive "Statny Archiv in Kosice, Slovakia"

- Roman Catholic church records (births/marriages/deaths): 1772-1895 (parish A)
- Greek Catholic church records (births/marriages/deaths): 1773-1895 (parish A)
- Reformated church records (births/marriages/deaths): 1816-1895 (parish B)

== See also ==
- List of municipalities and towns in Slovakia
