= Brezovica, Sabinov District =

Municipality of Slovakia in Sabinov district

Brezovica
- Municipality
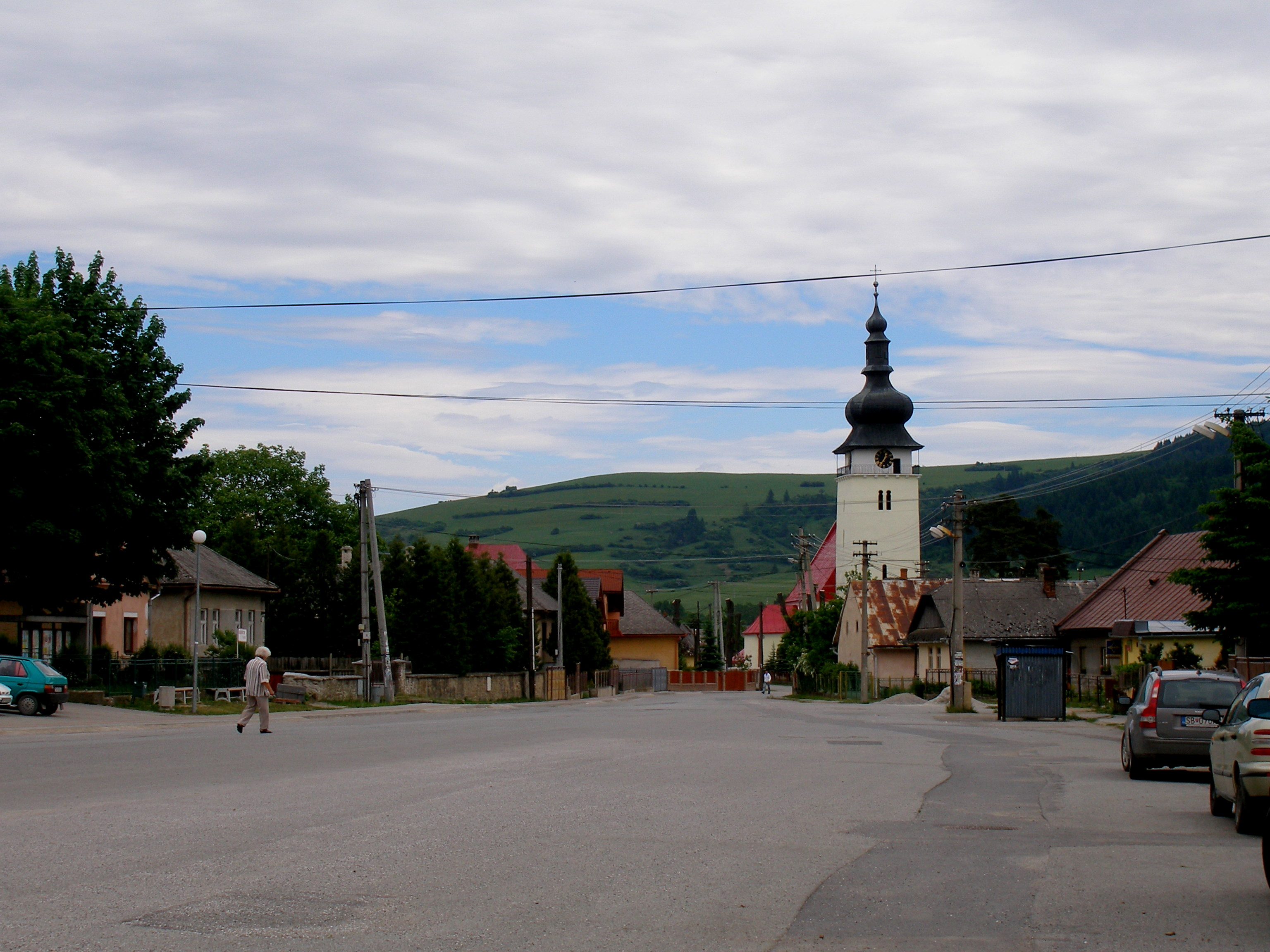

- Flag

- Location of Brezovica in the Prešov Region Location of Brezovica in Slovakia
- Coordinates: 49°8′43″N 20°50′51″E
- Country: Slovakia
- Region: Prešov Region
- District: Sabinov District
- First mentioned: 1317

Government
  - Mayor: Jozef Hodoši

Area
  - Total: 18.23 km^{2} (7.04 sq mi)
- Elevation: 447 m (1,467 ft)

Population (2025)
  - Total: 1,681
- Time zone: UTC+1 (CET)
  - Summer (DST): UTC+2 (CEST)
- Postal code: 827 4
- Area code: +421 51
- Vehicle registration plate (until 2022): SB
- Website: www.brezovicanadtorysou.sk

Brezovica, fully Brezovica nad Torysou (Hungarian: Berzevice, Berzevicze) is a village and municipality in Sabinov District in the Prešov Region of north-eastern Slovakia.

== History ==
In historical records the village was first mentioned in 1274.

== Geography ==
The municipality lies at an altitude of 447 metres (1,467 ft) and covers an area of 18.23 km^{2} (7.04 sq mi) (2025).

== Population ==
Population statistic (10 years)
Year	1995	2005	2015	2025
Count	1668	1686	1705	1681
Difference		+1.07%	+1.12%	−1.40%

Population statistic
Year	2024	2025
Count	1684	1681
Difference		−0.17%

It has a population of 1681 people (31 December 2025).

=== Ethnicity ===
Census 2021 (1+ %)
Ethnicity	Number	Fraction
Slovak	1659	98.16%
Not found out	30	1.77%
Rusyn	19	1.12%
Total	1690	

In year 2021 was 1690 people by ethnicity 1659 as Slovak, 30 as Not found out, 19 as Rusyn, 4 as Czech, 4 as German, 3 as Other, 1 as Russian and 1 as Hungarian.

Note on population: The difference values of population numbers in the table "Population statistic" and in the sections "Ethnicity" & "Religion" is caused by the use of various statistical methods.

=== Religion ===
Census 2021 (1+ %)
Religion	Number	Fraction
Roman Catholic Church	1550	91.72%
None	53	3.14%
Greek Catholic Church	43	2.54%
Not found out	30	1.78%
Total	1690	

In year 2021 was 1690 people by religion 1550 from Roman Catholic Church, 53 from None, 43 from Greek Catholic Church, 30 from Not found out, 4 from Ad hoc movements, 2 from Other and not ascertained christian church, 2 from Evangelical Church, 1 from Calvinist Church, 1 from Eastern Orthodox Church, 1 from Christian Congregations in Slovakia, 1 from Other, 1 from United Methodist Church and 1 from Apostolic Church.

== People ==
- Berzeviczy family

== Genealogical resources ==
The records for genealogical research are available at the state archive in Prešov (Slovak: Štátny archív v Prešove).

- Roman Catholic church records (births/marriages/deaths): 1838-1896 (parish A)
- Greek Catholic church records (births/marriages/deaths): 1810-1907 (parish B)

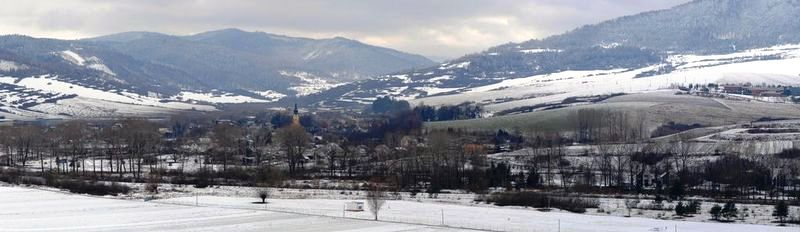
Brezovica and Levočské vrchy Mts.

== See also ==
- List of municipalities and towns in Slovakia
