= Veterná Poruba =

- Municipality
- Flag

- Location of Veterná Poruba in the Žilina Region Location of Veterná Poruba in Slovakia
- Coordinates: 49.12°N 19.68°E
- Country: Slovakia
- Region: Žilina Region
- District: Liptovský Mikuláš District
- First mentioned: 1353

Area
  - Total: 4.72 km^{2} (1.82 sq mi)
- Elevation: 819 m (2,687 ft)

Population (2025)
  - Total: 358
- Time zone: UTC+1 (CET)
  - Summer (DST): UTC+2 (CEST)
- Postal code: 310 1
- Area code: +421 44
- Vehicle registration plate (until 2022): LM
- Website: www.veternaporuba.sk

Veterná Poruba (Hungarian: Szélporuba, formerly Szélesporuba) is a village and municipality in Liptovský Mikuláš District in the Žilina Region of northern Slovakia.

== History ==
In historical records the village was first mentioned in 1353 as Poruba. and was created by colonizing the lands of the family Okolicsányi, who owned the village until 1848. In 1715, 16 taxpayers lived in the village, in 1784 the village had 40 houses and 302 inhabitants, in 1828 there were 37 houses and 336 inhabitants who were employed as farmers and forest workers. Before the establishment of independent Czechoslovakia in 1918, Veterná Poruba was part of Liptó County within the Kingdom of Hungary. From 1939 to 1945, it was part of the Slovak Republic.

Not far from Veterná Poruba is the former village of Svätý Štefan, which was first mentioned in 1272 and was named after the patronage of the local church. In 1719 the village was abandoned after a natural disaster.

== Geography ==
The municipality lies at an altitude of 819 metres (2,687 ft) and covers an area of 4.72 km^{2} (1.82 sq mi) (2025).

The municipality lies in the middle part of the Liptov basin on the ridge of the hill Štefanka at an altitude of 820 meters, which belongs to the higher sub-Tatra villages. The village is located northeast of 9 kilometers from the district town of Liptovský Mikuláš. To the north of the village rises the ends of the Western Tatras.

== Population ==
Population statistic (10 years)
Year	1995	2005	2015	2025
Count	361	357	381	358
Difference		−1.10%	+6.72%	−6.03%

Population statistic
Year	2024	2025
Count	362	358
Difference		−1.10%

It has a population of 358 people (31 December 2025).

=== Ethnicity ===
Census 2021 (1+ %)
Ethnicity	Number	Fraction
Slovak	381	98.44%
Not found out	5	1.29%
Total	387	

In year 2021 was 387 people by ethnicity 381 as Slovak, 5 as Not found out, 3 as Czech and 2 as Rusyn.

Note on population: The difference values of population numbers in the table "Population statistic" and in the sections "Ethnicity" & "Religion" is caused by the use of various statistical methods.

=== Religion ===
Census 2021 (1+ %)
Religion	Number	Fraction
Evangelical Church	227	58.66%
None	82	21.19%
Roman Catholic Church	56	14.47%
Not found out	9	2.33%
Total	387	

In year 2021 was 387 people by religion 227 from Evangelical Church, 82 from None, 56 from Roman Catholic Church, 9 from Not found out, 3 from Other and not ascertained christian church, 2 from Paganism and natural spirituality, 2 from Greek Catholic Church, 2 from Ad hoc movements, 1 from Eastern Orthodox Church, 1 from United Methodist Church, 1 from Church of the Brethren and 1 from Buddhism.

== Government ==
The village relies on Liptovský Mikuláš for a tax office and police and fire brigade services.
