= Okolicsányi family =

Coat of arms of the Okolicsányi family

Okolicsányi (historically: Akalichnai, Okolicany, Okolicsányi, Okolicsányi, Okolicsányi, Okoličáni, Okoličiansky) are one of the important and ancestral noble families in Liptov in the Kingdom of Hungary. In central Liptov, they owned extensive estates and villages: Veterná Poruba, Štefanka, Lazisko, the settlement of Črmnô, Harankfiahaza (now unknown) and Okoličné, from which they probably derived their surname. The family gradually acquired, mainly through marriages, properties in Pavčina Lehota, Svátý Kríž, Ančikovany and Vitálišovce. In the last quarter of the 18th century, the family also acquired the town of Bobrovec. Some members of the "Miškovci" branch, namely Vendel, Karol and Baltazár, changed their name with higher permission to Szemesi in 1864.

In the oldest documents, individual members of the family appear as "domini et heredes de Okoliczna" (or Akalichna) - lords and descendants of Okoličné and with the Latin designation comes/comitis. Functions and titles containing comes, such as the French "comte" or the English "count", come from the Latin word for "companion". It is a title in European countries denoting a position between the high and lower nobility. In a later period, members of the family appeared under the general term "nobilis".

== Origin and historical development ==
=== Liptov around 1230 ===
In 1230, King Andrew II issued the first deed of gift for the territory called Mogorfalú to two so-called "guests", namely Bench and Hauch (Hank) Polko (some authors distinguish three and not two persons, namely Beuch, Hauch and Polko). This territory extends from the Revúcá River to the Bocký stream without the territory of Sliače, Liptovská Mara, Sielnica and Bobrovec. It was an "empty land", located in Liptov, which once belonged to the village of Uhorská Ves. The term "empty land" - terra vacans - should be understood not as uninhabited, desolate land without a population, but as property legally unoccupied, which therefore fell under the donation authority of the Hungarian kings.

The origin of almost all Liptov noble families was directly related to military service to the Hungarian kings. The possession of land and acquired property was then closely linked to it. Until the mid-13th century, Liptov nobles performed their military service mainly in the bands of the Zvolen governors, after the construction of Liptov Castle in the mid-13th century they were tied primarily to this castle.

=== Ancestors of the family ===
Authors J. Novák and P. Vítek consider Bohumír as one of the oldest ancestors of the family. He was the son of the Czech knight Lawrence (listed as Lauryn in the Liptov register). In 1241, Lawrence participated as the commander of a military unit in the Battle of Mohi.

Bohumír spent a long time at the royal court, where, based on his prudence and bravery, he gained an important position. He fought alongside the king and also earned merit as a special envoy in the then Poland and Russia. This is how he is mentioned in the decree issued in 1267 by King Béla IV, in which he donated a large forest area between Hybica and the border with Spiš. He also hosted King Ladislaus IV at his residence, who in 1273 donated the "Solomon's Land" (later Črmno and Svatý kříž) separated from the Paludza territory. Bohumír also used the title "comes", but in his case this rank was of a military nature (qui regem in bellum comitebat - who accompanied the king to war).

=== After 1280 ===
The authors trace the origin of the family to the reign of King Bela IV (1235–1270) to Serafín I., A. Húščava in his study, which he devoted exclusively to this problem, confirmed that the founder of the Okolicsányi family was Serafín I, the first mention of whom dates back to 1282. Serafín served as a servient of the Zvolen governor Mikuláš in the royal army. In the autumn of 1280, he actively participated in the battle of Lake Hód (today Hódmezóvásárhely – north of Szeged), where the royal army, led by King Ladislaus IV, defeated the Cumans. Serafin allegedly acted extremely heroically in the battle, when "not without shedding his own blood he valiantly cut off the head of a noble Cuman and showed it to the king". For this and many other services, Ladislaus IV confirmed his ownership of Črmno and the Svätý kríž in 1282.

It is impossible to determine exactly when Serafín acquired Okoličné from written sources, but in 1293 his son Peter appears to have been in possession of it. Serafín also had another son, Mikuláš, and both brothers divided Okoličné between themselves after their father's death. Mikuláš, however, died soon after and his share of the property was inherited by his son Pavol, who served in the royal army. He could not therefore devote himself to his Liptov property and gave it to his uncle Peter, his father's brother, for use, as the Turčiansky convent testified to in 1288. In 1295, Pavol acquired land between Okoličné and Vrbica. However, Pavol himself fell shortly after that during the siege of the castle of Kysak (Kôszeg) and his property thus fell to the monarch, since he had no heirs. However, already in 1297, Andrew III donated Pavol's part to his uncle Peter, the son of Serafín, and ordered the Zvolen and Šariš county governor Demeter to bring Peter into possession of the entire and indivisible village of Okoličné. However, Peter had some problems with the possession of his properties in Okoličné and Črmno, and therefore in 1326 he asked the monarch for its confirmation. The monarch complied and, as special merits of Peter, recalled his loyalty and services, which he showed to the king in Orava against the people of Matúš Čák Trenčiansky and also in Zagreb and Transylvania. Shortly after, undoubtedly after the death of his father, Peter's son Ján lost his property in Liptov when, during the reign of Charles Robert, for unknown reasons was unable to submit documents proving his ownership for review. His property was taken from him and assigned to the property of Hrádok Castle.

Only in 1352 did King Louis I the Great return them to him again, for his many military merits during the expedition to Naples, Italy, during which he allegedly lost an eye. In addition to Peter's son Ján, the recipients of the new donation were also his other sons, Marek, Vavrinec and Serafín, and it was only this donation from 1352 that became the permanent legal property basis of the Okolicsányi family in the future. During the revision led by the regional judge Imrich Bubek, the sons of Mark I and the son of Serafil II Ján proved themselves with donation documents from kings Ladislaus IV, Andrew III and Charles I However, the judge declared only the donation documents from King Louis I to be valid.

Louis I donated the southern part of the Revúcka Valley to Marek I (Markus), son of Peter of Okoličné, in 1367 and after a conflict with the forger Ján Literát of Madočany, Matúš of Stošice and his brother, he acquired Grienovište (formerly: Boztelek, Bozefold, Kovachfelde) from Louis I in 1381 in exchange for an estate called Reuchetornya.

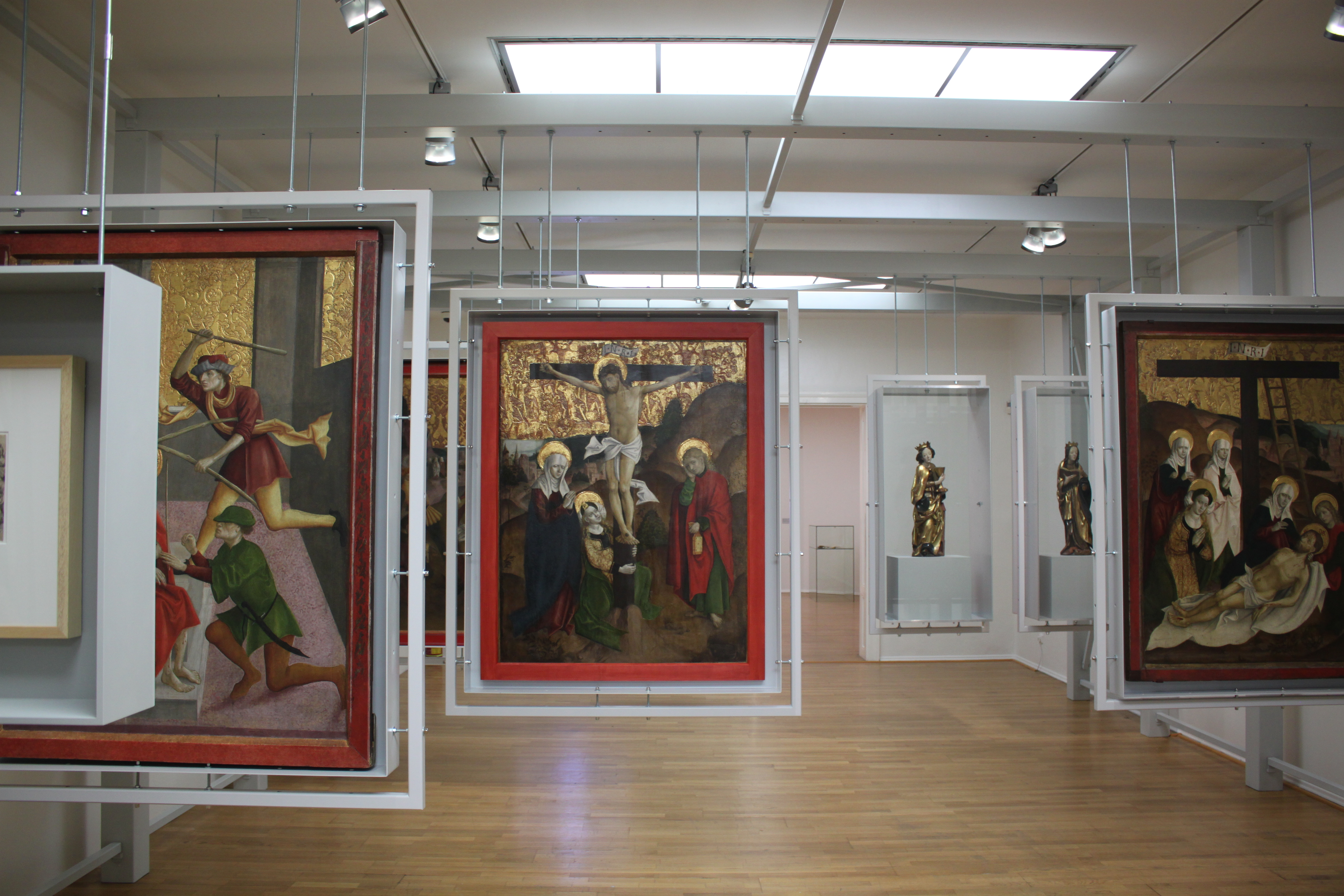
Exhibition of the former Marian altar from the Monastery Church of St. Peter of Alcántara in Okoličné at the Slovak National Gallery in Bratislava, 2017

In 1435, Michal I of Okoličné, son of Ján II of Okoličné, granted partial city privileges to Okoličné, modeled on privileges of Nemecká Ľupča (today Partizánská Ľupča). Michal (documented in the years 1464–1484) acted in various judicial functions. In 1464, as a respected nobleman, he was a witness in a property dispute, which was resolved by the Liptov governor together with his servants. In 1480, he is listed among the arbitrators in another document. In 1466, Michal is also documented as a lay member of the Liptov religious brotherhood (confraternity), which brought together Liptov parish priests and also representatives of the local nobility. In 1453, Michal from Okoličné managed from the Archbishop of Esztergom to have the chapel of St. Cosmas and Damian elevated to a parish church. At the same time, he requested that members of his family, as well as members of noble families, whose dead were previously buried at the parish church in Liptovský Mikuláš, to be able to have their final resting place in this building. Michal probably died at the end of 1484. A document from January 1, 1485, already mentions Uršula, the widow of Michal of Okoličné, who became the wife of his namesake, another Michal of Okoličné.

From the next generation living at the turn of the 15th and 16th centuries, the brothers Leonard and Bernard stood out from the Okolicsányi family. In 1495, they appear as patrons of the Okoličné church of St. Cosmas and Damian. Bernard is mentioned in 1512 as a judge in a dispute and in the following year as a Liptov servant. He is also a relevant member of the family who could have influenced the donation of the original main altar of the church of the Virgin Mary - Queen of Angels with the Franciscan monastery in Okoličné (today the Church of St. Peter of Alcántara).

== Members of the family ==
The most accurate genealogical table from Serafín I to the end of the 15th century was published by A. Húščava, the younger Okolicsányi family was provided by I. Nagy. The family gradually acquired properties, especially in Liptó, but also in other counties of Slovakia. Outside the territory of Slovakia, we meet the Okolicsányi mainly in the Heves and Vas County counties, from 1818 in the Szabolcs County and a few years later also in the Pest county. The most important members of the family are described in the Encyclopedia of Slovakia, namely Imrich, who was a canon priest of Spiš, in 1773 a canon priest of Esztergom, St. Stephen's provost, titular bishop of Ansár, in 1779 a governor and in the years 1782–1786 and 1790–1795 a court councilor and referent, who died in Vienna in 1795. As well as Ján Okoličáni († 1736), bishop of Bratislava, later St. Stephen's provost and bishop of Varadin, to whom the Church of the Holy Trinity in Trnava owes its existence. He also expanded the seminary in Bratislava.

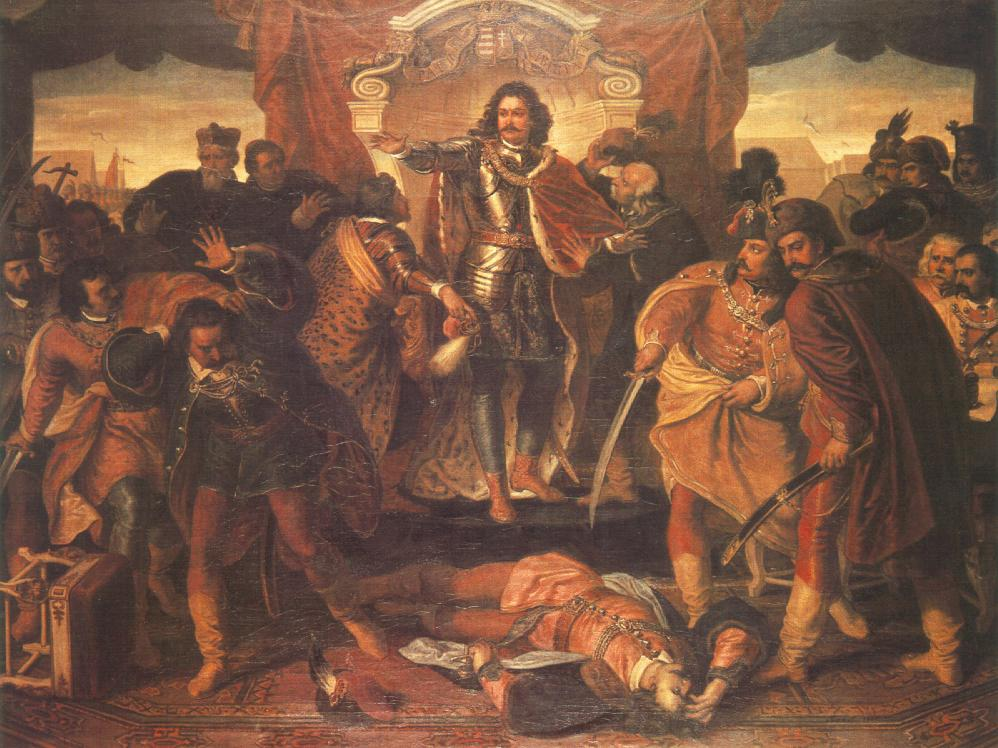
Attack on Turiec envoys at the Diet of Ónod in 1707

Kristóf Okolicsányi († June 9, 1707), county deputy governor of the Turóc County county and deputy at the Onód Diet, where he was accused of threatening the unity of the struggle for freedom with his activities and was attacked, together with his deputy Menyhért Rakovszky, by the enraged followers of Rákóczi and executed on June 9. The Turiec county was abolished at the Diet, its banners torn, seals broken and the territory annexed to the neighboring counties. All 58 deputies of the Diet for the Turóc county were imprisoned and their property confiscated. Additionally, the county was restored and the Okolicsányi coat of arms was inserted into the coat of arms of the county in 1715 as a reminder of this event.

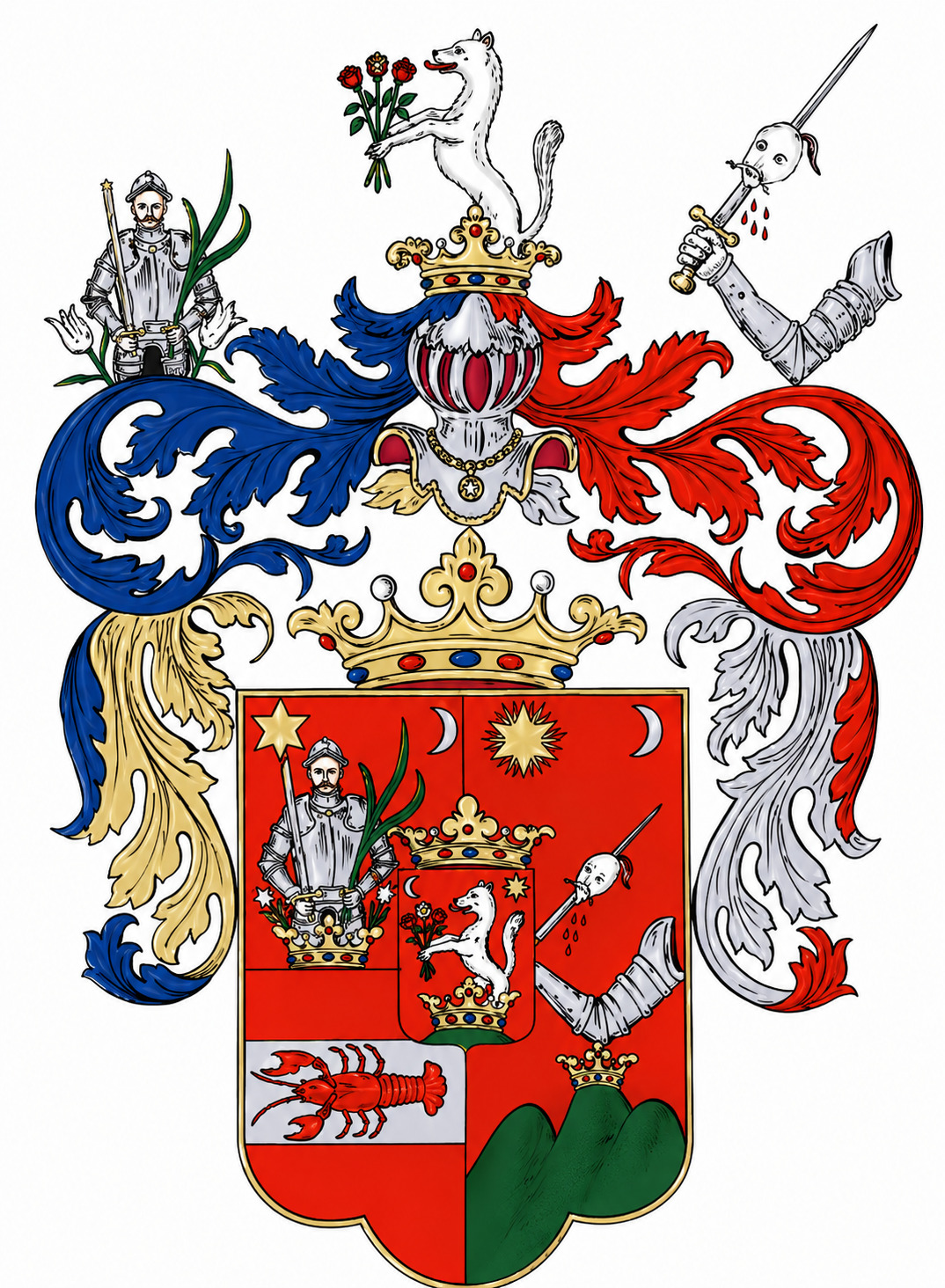
Coat of arms of the Turiec county

Next is Pál Okolicsányi († before 1721), legal advisor to Francis II Rákóczi and author of a work on the history of Protestantism in Hungary. The Encyclopedia of Slovakia also mentions the aforementioned Mihály Okolicsányi, who had a Franciscan monastery and church built in Okoličné (now church of St. Peter of Alkántara).

László Okolicsányi, as the county deputy governor of Liptó, presided over the trial of Juraj Jánošík. The county deputy governor László Okolicsányi was personally involved in the repressive measures against the rest of Rákóczi's rebels and bandits, who, like in the case of Jánošík, were also originally rebels. The reason was the raid on the manor house of the sub-prefect's father, János Okolicsányi in Okoličné on May 1, 1709.

István Okolicsányi (* 13 August 1824) adopted the university professor MUDr. Dezider Kuthy (* 13 July 1869, Vienna). On 11 June 1905, Kuthy received the nobility, surname and coat of arms of Okolicsányi, as well as the right to use both surnames. This decision was entered into the royal register two years later.

I. Nagy also mentions Mihály (†1771), who was a canon priest of Spiš from 1757, later a canon priest of Esztergom. As well as János, an imperial-royal court advisor murdered in the village of Bátor in 1859.

The family archive, made available to Prof. A. Húščava, of the Okolicsányi belongs to the largest private archives of the former Liptó county. Part of it is located in the Janko Kráľ Museum in Liptovský Mikuláš, part in the State Archives in Bytča, and part is in the hands of the descendants of the family and inaccessible for research. The family archive was kept by a "director", who was also the administrator of the family's joint (compossessorate) properties. The last one was János Okolicsányi, who resigned from the position in 1916. The family archive sometimes contained over a hundred documents, of which only a fraction have survived. It can be assumed that in addition to the property that was distributed, property deeds were also distributed.

Okoličné as a family seat remained in the feudal ownership of the Okolicsányi until the abolition of serfdom in 1848. Around this time, the property was divided between the individual branches of the family. In the 19th and early 20th centuries, several families of this family lived in the territory of the original donation in Okoličné. Over the generations, the family branched out into individual branches: the Antals (from the name Antal), the Piters, the Miškovs (part of which were renamed the Kalmans after the name Koloman) and the Filoxers.

== Portraits of some members of the family ==
Mária Okolicsányi, 1830, oil painting, by Jozef Czauczik. On an oval neutral background is depicted the bust of a young woman with large dark eyes, her hair arranged in a ponytail at the back, in 3/4 profile to the right. She is wearing a white dress, with golden metal buttons on the bodice and sleeves and a belt. On her neck is an eight-row white pearl necklace, on her chest is a thick gold chain with an equal-armed anchor cross. Roses in her hair. The painting is on display in the Spiš Museum in Levoča.

Agnes Okolicsányi née Spielenbergerová, 1826, oil painting. On the back of the canvas: Agnes v. Okolicsányi geborene v. Spielenberg. According to Glatz, she came from a patrician family from Levoča, married Ľudovít Okolicsányi, whose father Mikuláš was the county deputy governor of Spiš. She was born in 1798. The painting is on permanent display in the Strážky Manor.

Anna Okolicsányi, 1757, oil painting. The subject is a young woman in a dress embroidered with gold and silver thread and a dark purple apron, also embroidered with white and gold flowers. The painting must have belonged to the family portrait gallery. The bodice is edged with strips of lace and there is a lace appliqué on the front. The neckline is complemented by a wide piece of lace embroidered with a pearl draped over the chest. The blouse has an embroidered lace hem and the upper part of the sleeves is tied with embroidered ribbons. The headband is embroidered with pearls, the neckpiece is a black ribbon with a bow and white pearls, the bracelets are of a similar type. The background is gray. On the table covered with blue drapery is a red flower, next to a jewelry box and a watch. In her hand she holds a rose with three blossoming and budding flowers and three leaves, on each of which are the names of her children: Pau/lus/, Car/olus/, Jos/ephus/. On the back is marked Anna Okolicsányi wife of Jozef Szmrecsanyi. The painting is on display in the Hungarian Historical Gallery - Hungarian National Museum in Budapest.

Ludwig von Okolicsányi, 1826, oil painting. On the back of the canvas: Ludwig von Okolicsány gemalt 1826. The painting is in the exhibition of the Liptov Gallery of Peter Michal Bohúň.

Ján Okolicsányi (Okolicsányi János), 1798–1859, courtier.

Albert Okolicsányi, 18th century, oil painting. The painting is on display at the Hansági Museum in Mosonmagyaróvár.

Farkas Okolicsányi, baron, 18th century, oil painting. The painting is on display at the Hansági Museum in Mosonmagyaróvár.

József Okolicsányi, 1775 - 1804, oil painting. Chamber councilor, royal administrator of the XVI. towns of Spiš. He is the author of a monograph of the Augustinian Evangelical Diocese of Nógrád.

Mária Okolicsányi, 1830

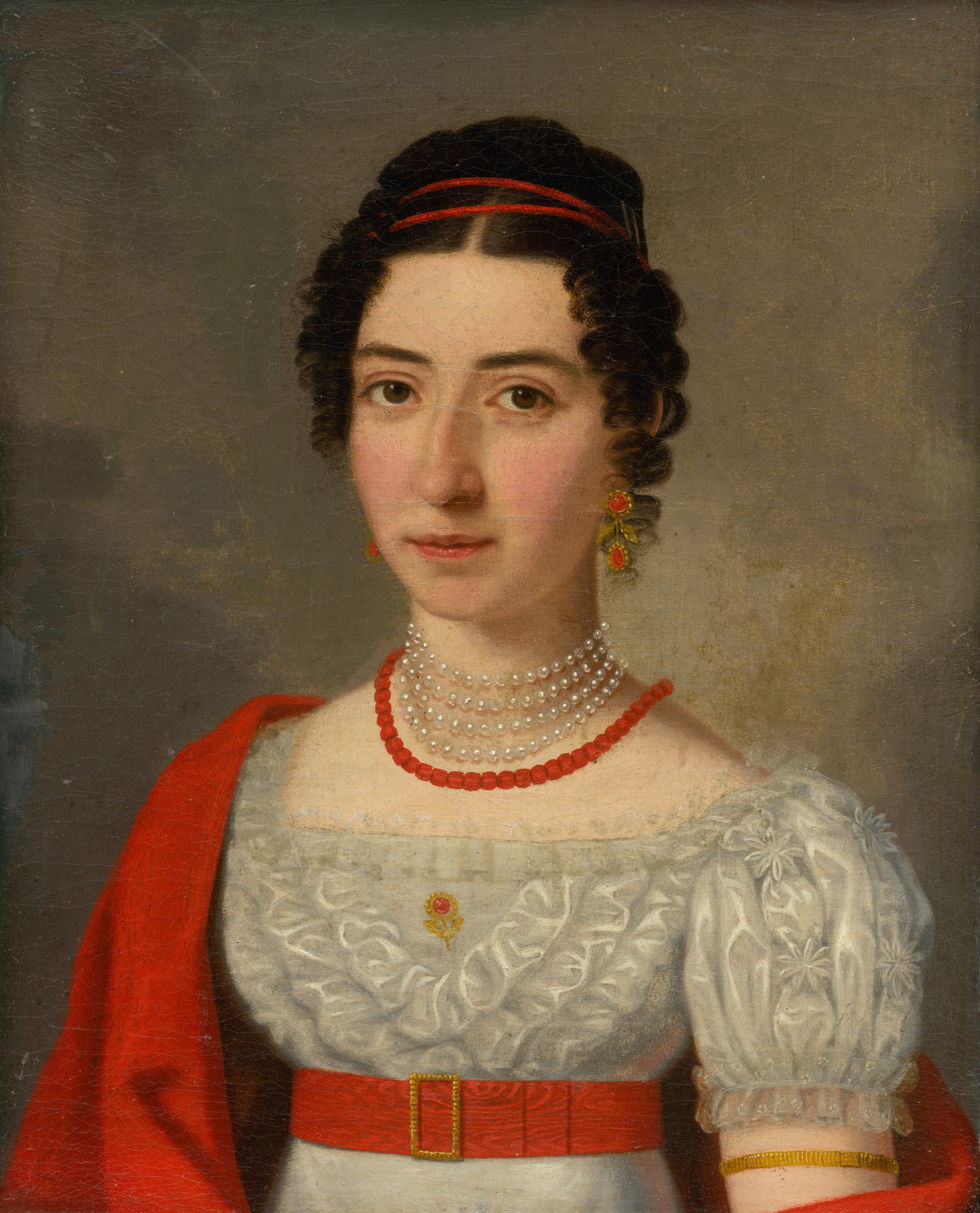
Agnes Okolicsányi née Spielenbergerová, 1826

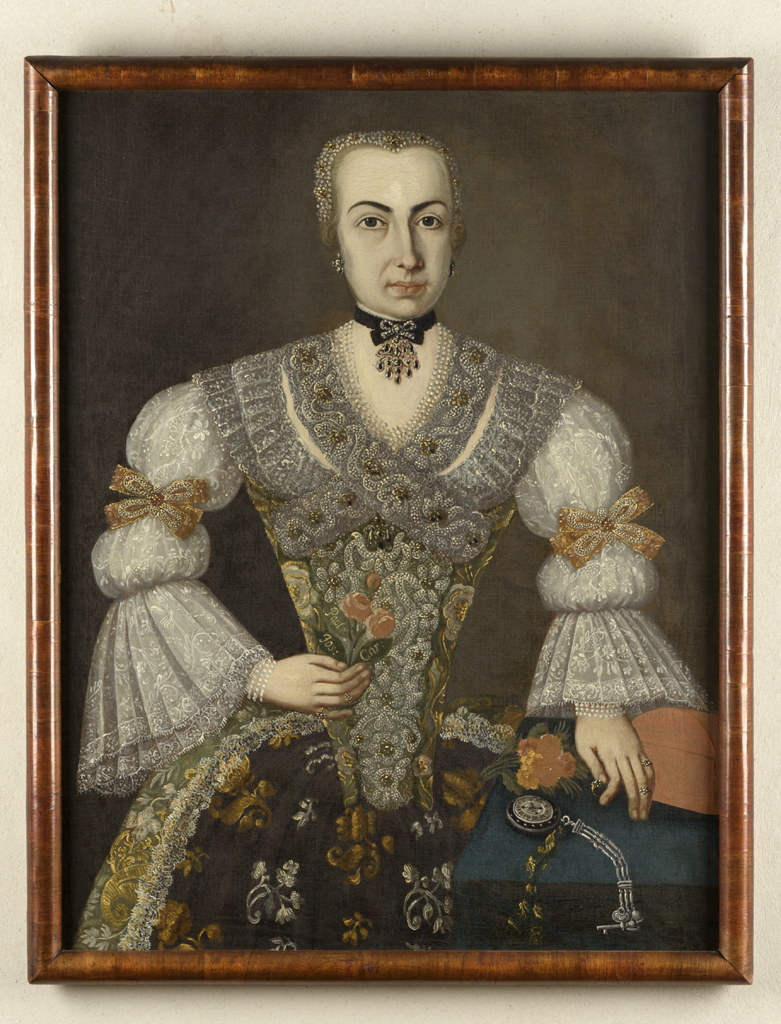
Anna Okolicsányi, 1757

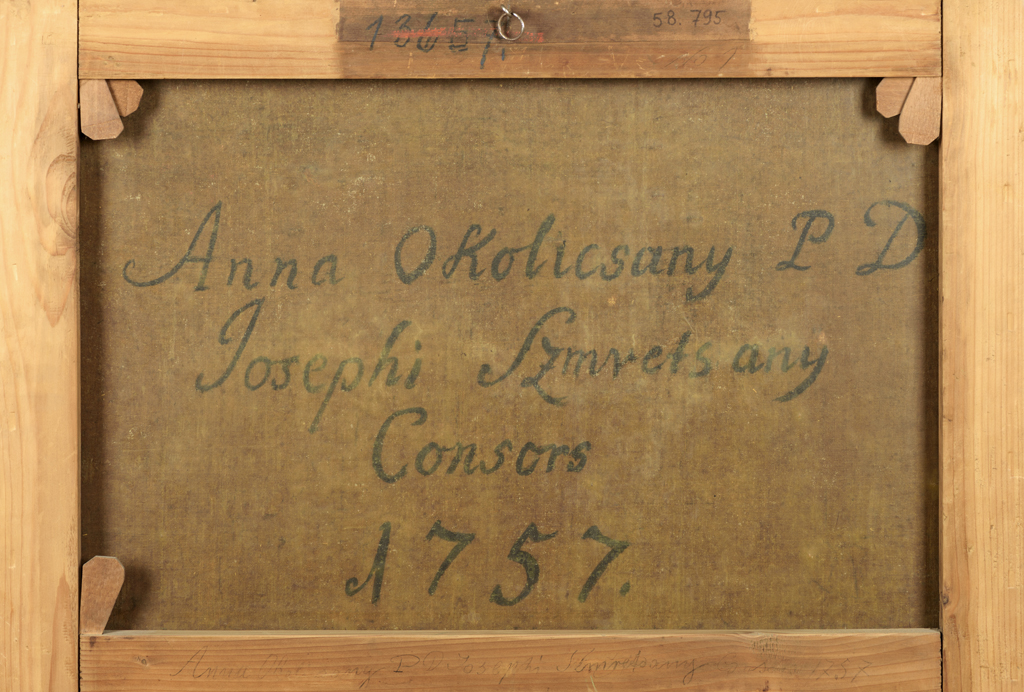
Anna Okolicsányi, 1757 - marked on the back Anna Okolicsányi wife of Jozef Szmrecsanyi

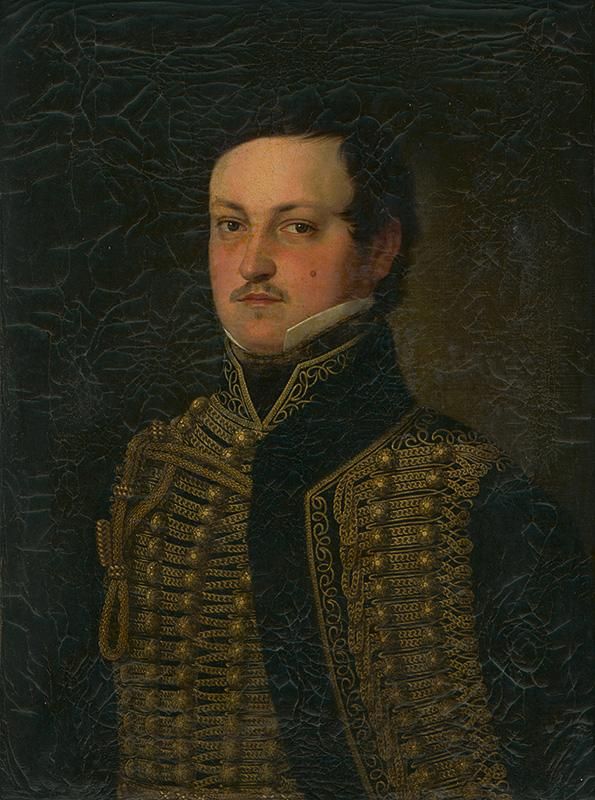
Ludvig von Okolicsány, 1826

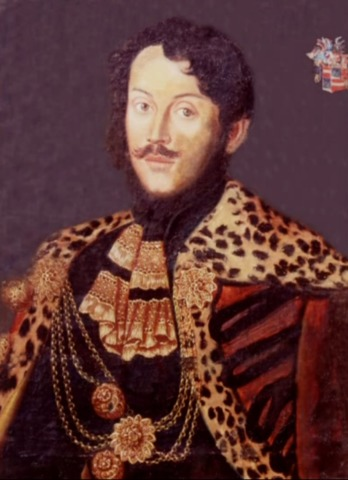
Ján Okolicsányi (Okolicsányi János) 1798–1859

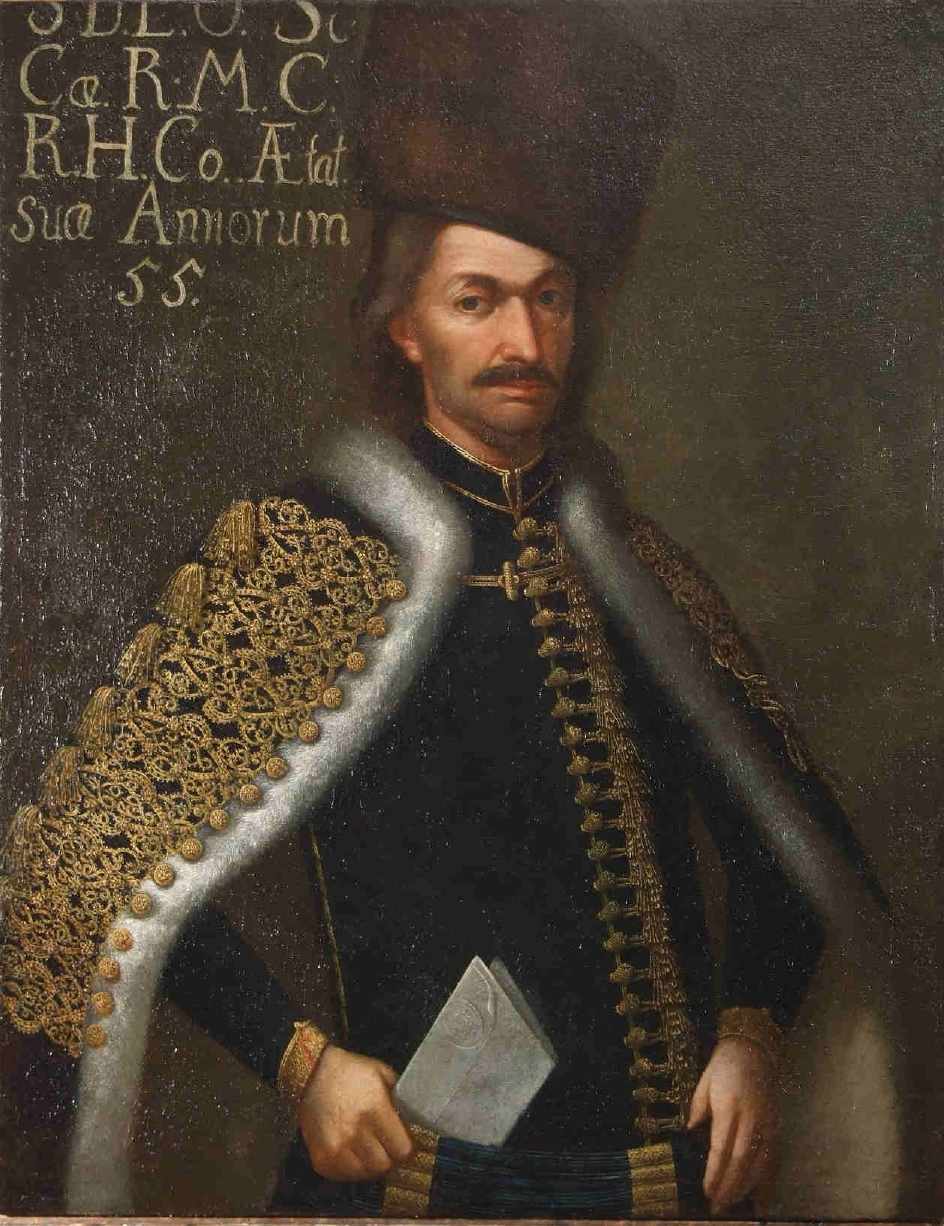
Albert Okolicsányi

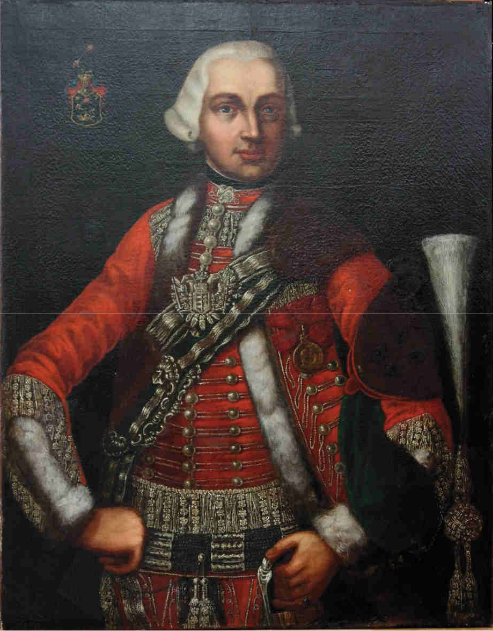
Farkas Okolicsányi

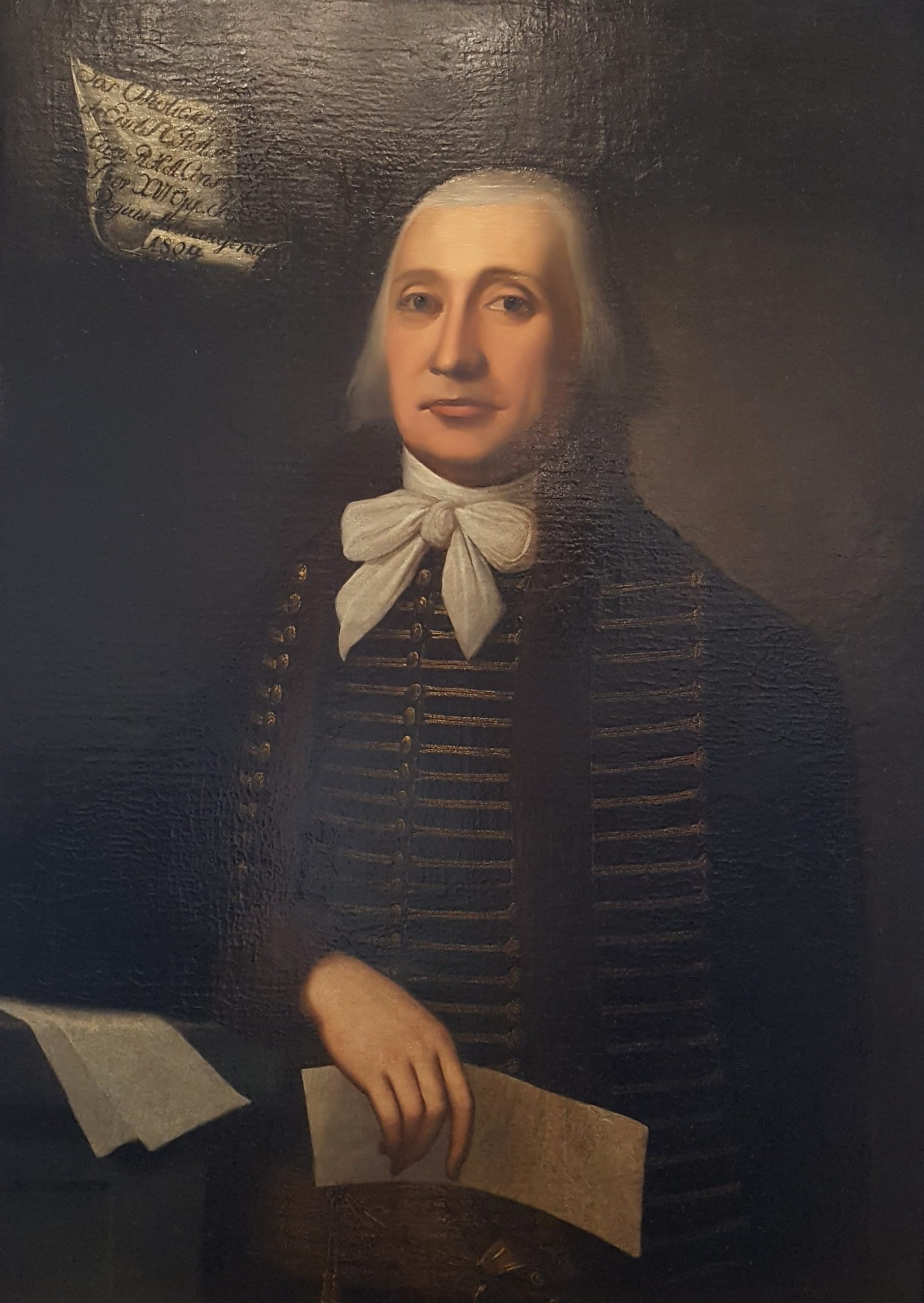
József Okolicsányi, chamber councilor, royal administrator of the XVI. towns of Spiš

== Historical legacy ==
Generations of members of this family have participated in the running of the Liptov county and its economic and cultural progress since the Middle Ages. The Okolicsányi, together with other families such as the Bohumír family, significantly contributed to the expansion of the settlement structure in Liptov and were also a significant socio-cultural factor in communication with the central administration of the country and other regions of at that time Kingdom of Hungary.

The Okolicsányi were also represented at court as imperial-royal chamberlains. The rank was inseparable from the criteria for participation in the court and was held for members of the ancient nobility older than 24 years of age - if they requested it and the monarch did not distance himself from the appointment of the person in question. In addition, the person concerned had the obligation to be present at the ceremonies during Holy Week and at the procession. They were also counted on for extraordinary events at court, e.g.: at baptisms, weddings, funerals and coronations.

== Anthropological research ==
The exhumation of the ancestral crypt in the chapel of the church of St. Peter of Alcántara took place in the spring of 2016. As part of the research carried out in the summer of 2016, samples were taken from the skeletal remains and soil and were a subject of a microbiological analysis. The skeletal remains were damaged by high humidity. Archaeological research took place from April to October 2016, with the exhumation itself taking place from April 11 to 14 of that year. Subsequent archaeological and anthropological research estimated the number of buried individuals at 23. Of these, three were women, seven were men and 13 were of indeterminate sex. Of the pathological changes, two were most common – spinal disease recorded in six individuals and dental caries or intravital loss in eleven individuals. In November 2018, the skeletal remains were transported back to the church in Okoličné.

None of the finds date from the Middle Ages, and it is assumed that the family crypt was emptied in the 18th century. One of the causes could have been a significant flood in 1813, since burials in it are documented even in the second half of the 19th century.

Regarding the names of those buried in the family crypt, the chronicle states: "Resting places for the bodies of the deceased, popularly called crypts. The church has two of them: one in the chapel of Our Lady of Sorrows, the other in the sanctuary located in front of the main altar. The following are buried in the first crypt: The noble and enlightened Mr. Ján Okoličányi, formerly a prominent member of the convent and benefactor of the church with his wife Žofia Turanská. The noble and enlightened Mr. Ladislav Okoličányi, son of the previous one, former advisor to His Royal Majesty. The noble and enlightened Mr. Jozef Okoličányi, also son of Ján, county deputy governor of Orava with his first wife from the Revaj family. The enlightened Mr. Imrich Okoličányi and finally the Rev. Alexei Okoličányi, a Jesuit from St. Nicholas, died as a superior and was buried in the crypt in 1757. Also buried here from our (Franciscans; note) are: Bernard Najman, guardian of this convent, and Father Kazimír Langrueber, lecturer in moral theology (Urban 1759)".

I. Nagy mentions that, among others, Ján Okolicsányi († August 7, 1854) should also be buried in the crypt.

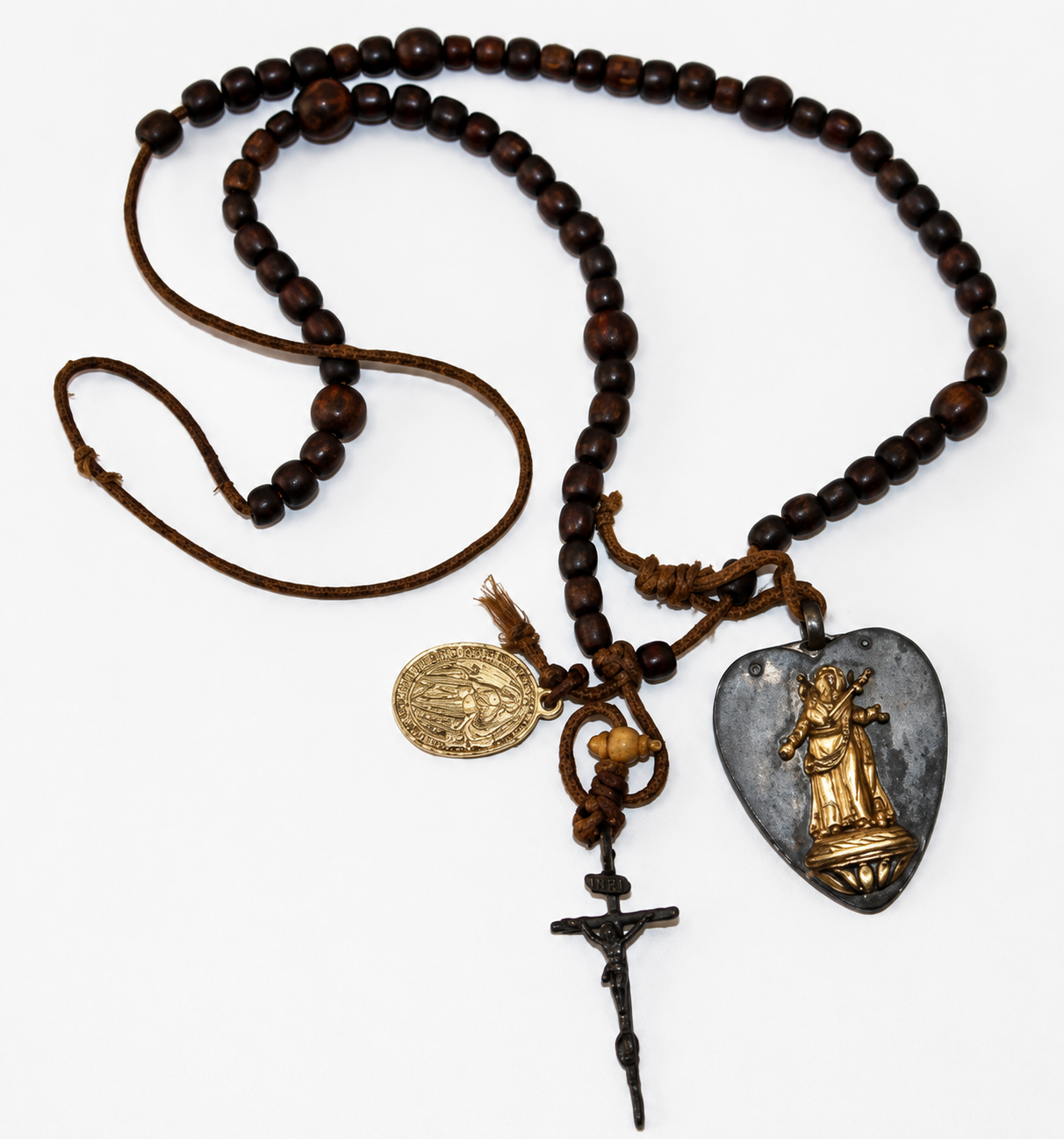
Grave goods from the crypt of the Okoličányi family in the church in Okoličné

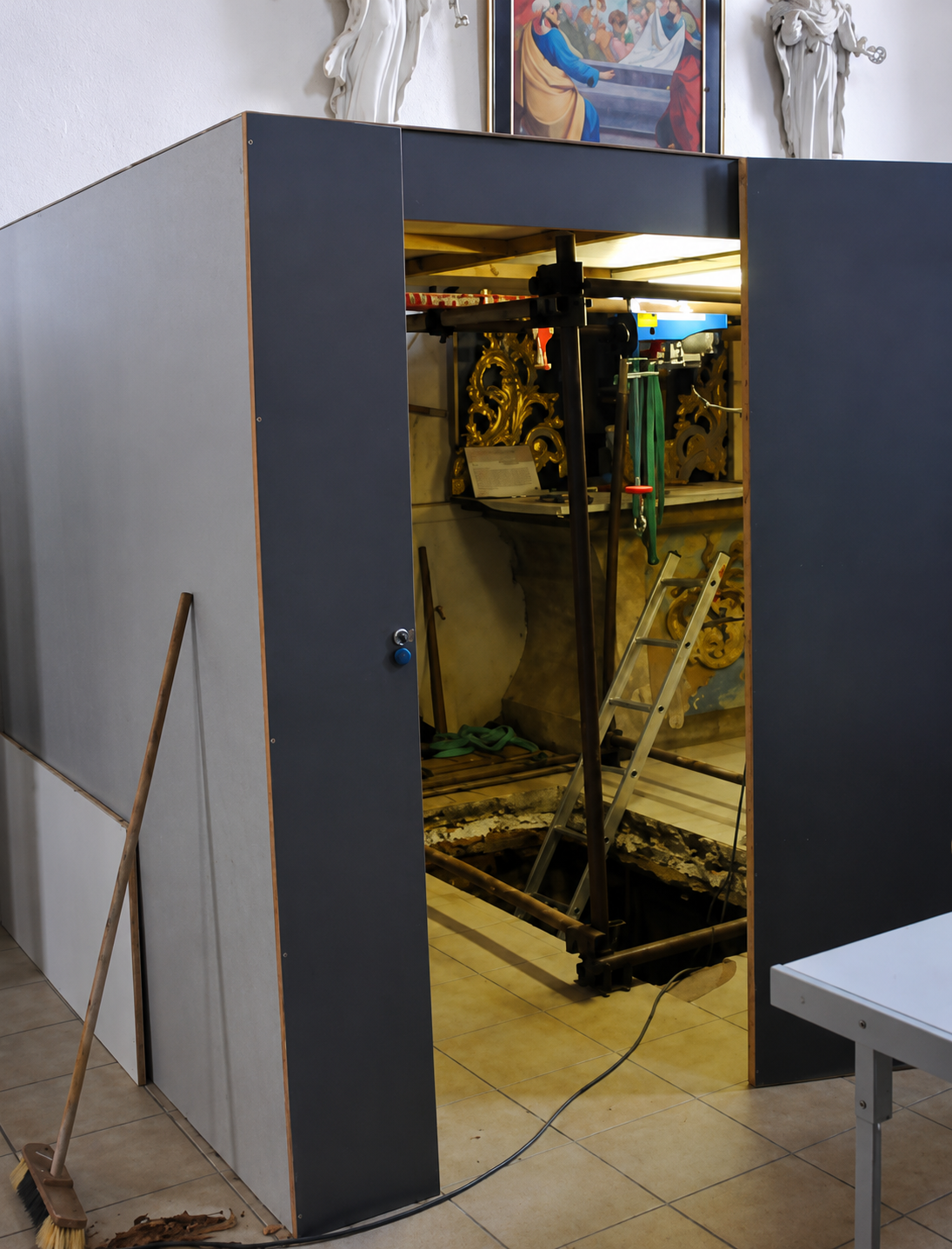
The entrance to the crypt is located in the western part of the side chapel

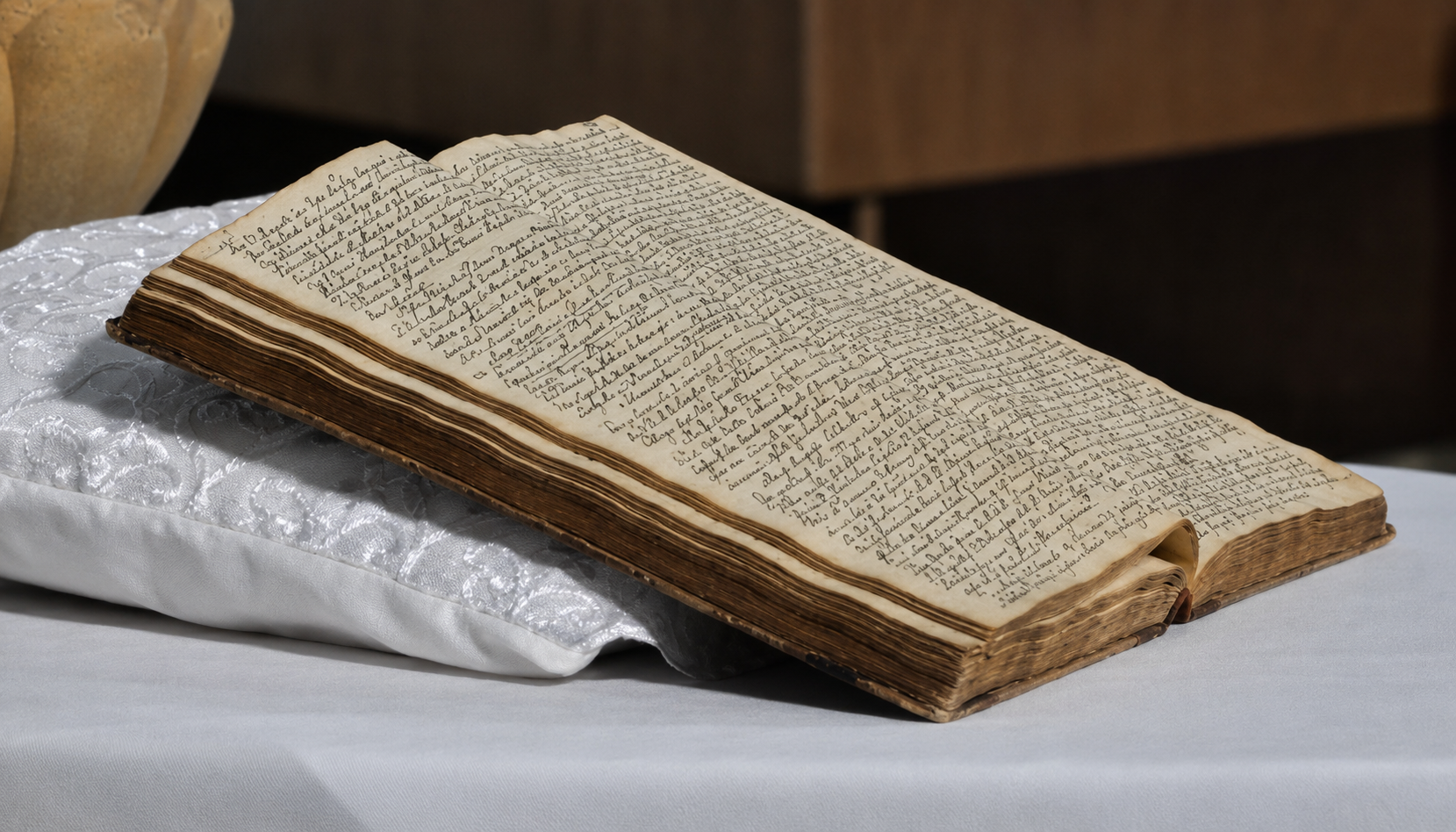
Historia domus - Liber Conventus Okolicznensis - a chronicle written between 1716 and 1920

== Church of St. Peter of Alcántara ==
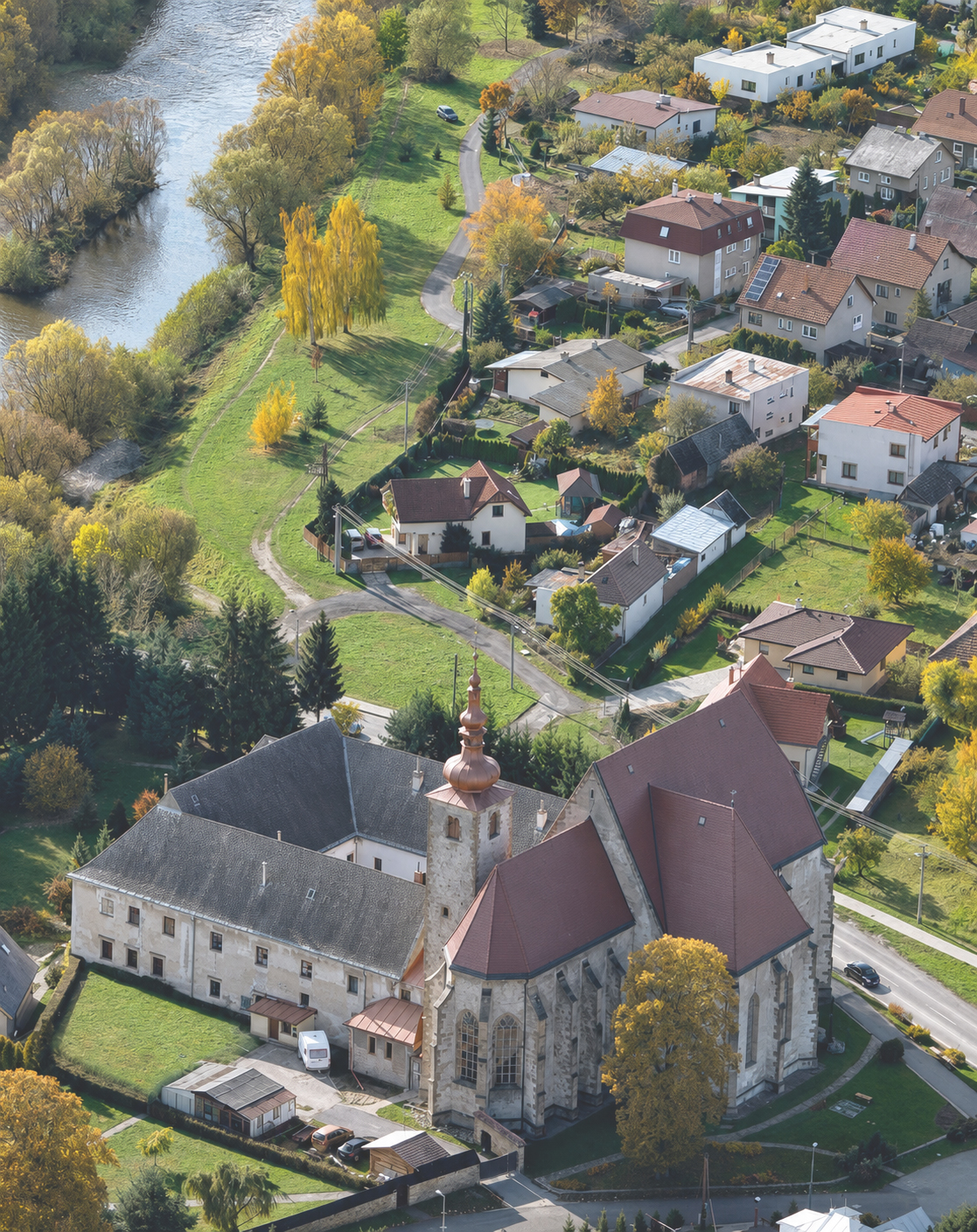
Monastery Church of St. Peter of Alcántara in Okoličné

Current knowledge assumes that the Church of St. Peter of Alcántara was founded by the Okolicsányi family in 1476, when, according to written records, the foundation stone was laid. This is one of the finest buildings of late Gothic architecture in Slovakia. The monastery in Okoličné was the largest sacral building in the Liptov County in the Middle Ages, but also one of the few examples of a three-nave layout in mendicant churches not only in Slovakia, but also within medieval Hungary. Given the location of the Franciscan convent right in the center of the Okolicsányi property domain, it is undeniable that the family must have played a significant and probably decisive role in its establishment. Matej Bel has already captured a living family tradition about the founding of the convent by Michal of Okoličné.

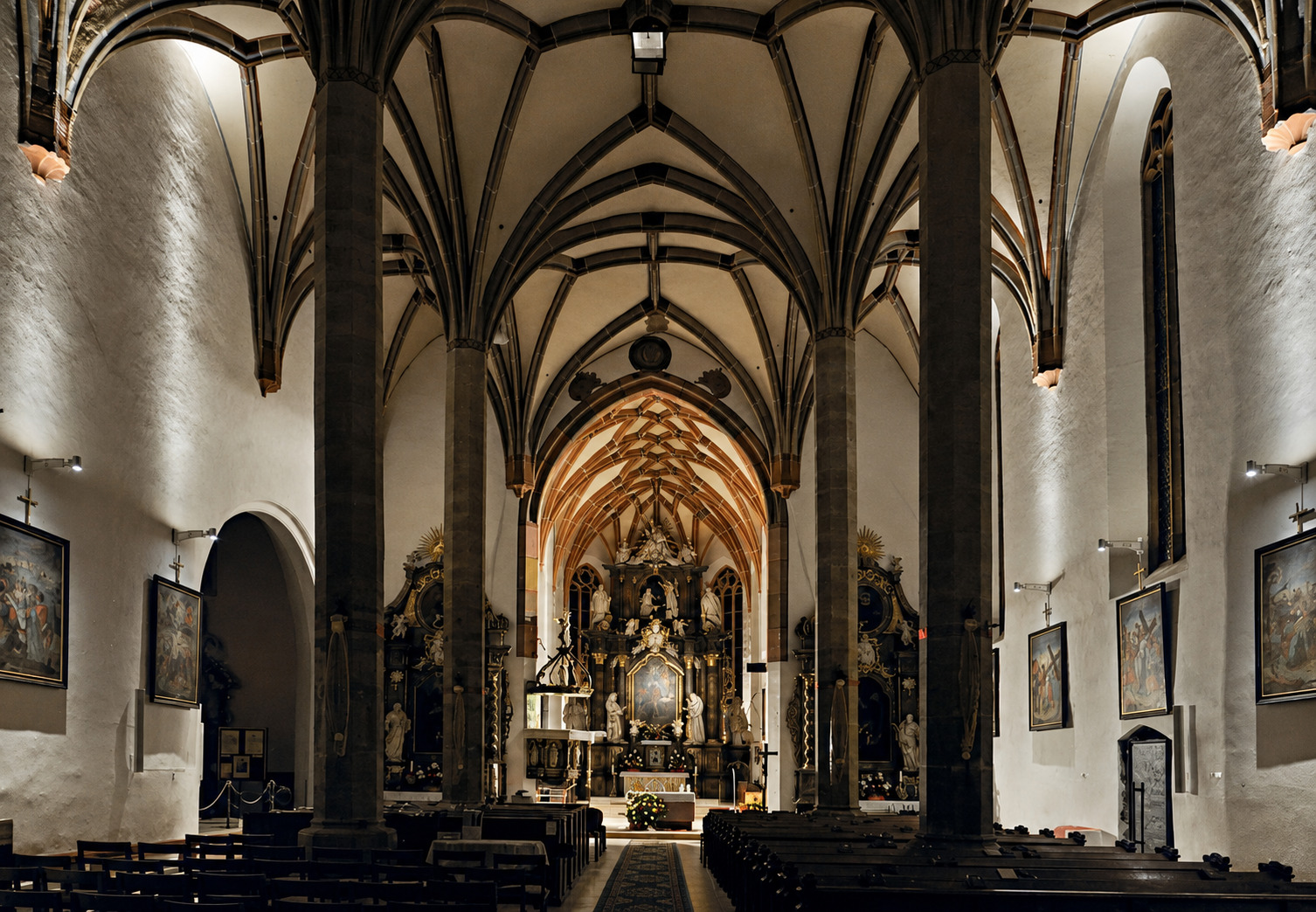
Church interior

Regarding the royal share in the construction, older literature relies mainly on the chronograms of 1489 and 1490 on the church, confirming the construction during the reign of Matthias Corvinus (1458 - 1490), as well as on the painted coats of arms of Matthias Corvinus and his wife Beatrix of Aragon above the triumphal arch of the church. Already Húščava and after him Papp stated that they could only refer to the reign of Matthias Corvinus. The construction was probably carried out with the material support of the surrounding noble families as well as the county governor Matúš of Čečejovce, whose donor activities were prematurely ended by the drastic change in political conditions after the death of Matthias Corvinus in 1490, as well as his subsequent death. Originally, he was to act as a support for the minor John Corvinus, the illegitimate son of Matthias Corvinus. Since Matthias Corvinus had no other descendants, he intended to make John his successor to the throne and, pursuing this goal, he also introduced new titles for him - among them the unconventional title of Prince of Liptov. Subsequently, and especially after the nobility rejected the claims of Matthias's illegitimate son to the throne, John Corvinus withdrew to southern Hungary.

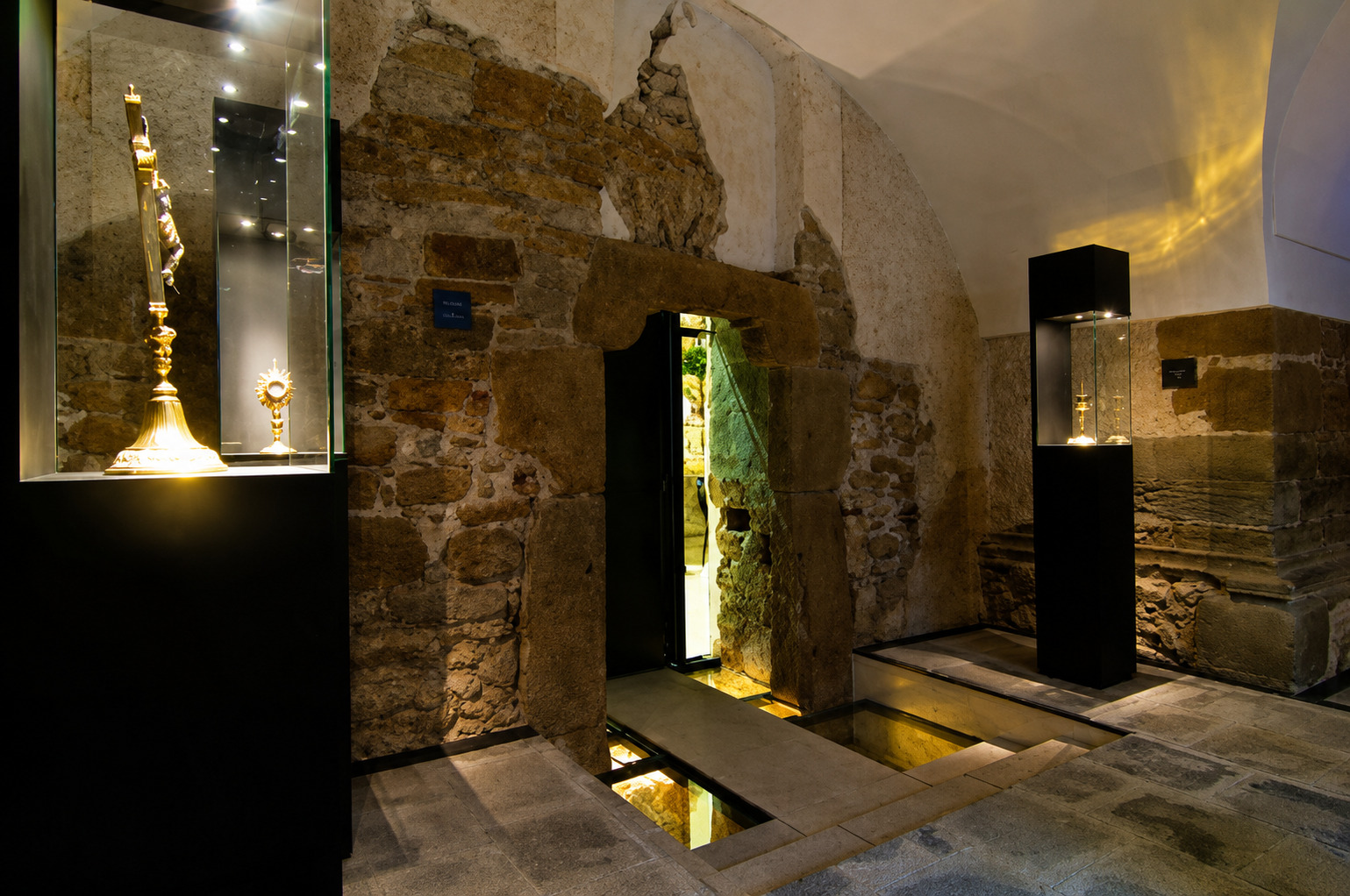
L. Mattyasovszky Museum

The possible, although not necessary, involvement of the Zápoľský family in the construction is indicated by the presence of the same stonemasonry mark as in the Church of the Holy Cross in Kežmarok. The same stonemasonry marks indicate the presence of the same craftsmen in the construction of both buildings.

The construction subsequently lasted until at least the beginning of the 16th century, which was confirmed by dendrochronological research of the truss above the sanctuary (dating to the years 1499 to 1500). The altar was made between 1500 and 1510.

Given that the monastery at least partially replaced the medieval Okoličné church of St. Cosmas and Damian in the area of burial, it can be assumed that a model of shared patronage was applied, in which the surrounding noble families also participated (namely the families from Vitališovce, Podhorie and Stošice). In exchange for the right to bury, this nobility undoubtedly participated in the material provision and building maintenance. The fact that the Okolicsányi actually exercised patronage rights to the monastery is clearly documented by their actions during the period of the demise of the Franciscan community in the second half of the 16th century, when they tried to secure the monastery's furnishings from being stolen. Also, the Franciscans themselves, upon their departure in 1571, identified Peter and Sebastian Okolicsányi as their patrons. Their return took place in 1672 through the mediation of Ján Okoličányi.

In the 18th century, the Okolicsányi family again appeared as patrons, when they furnished the interior with furniture bearing their heraldic symbols. In connection with the construction, reconstruction or painting of the altars in the church, the following names are mentioned: "Ladislav Okoličányi, son of Ján and previously advisor to the royal majesty, nobleman Ján Okoličányi, nobleman Jozef Okoličányi and Mikuláš Okoličányi" (Urban 1759). The building also contains the tomb of the Okolicsányi family in the western part of the side chapel.

== Outside the territory of Liptov ==
Members of this family later appeared in Orava, Turiec, Spiš, Bihar, Novohrad county and Transylvania – I. Nagy lists them.

- in Orava county
  - František 1632-1647 notary
  - Ján 1655 county deputy governor
  - Ján 1702-1703 prefect
  - Michal 1706 legal advisor
  - Adam 1706 legal advisor
  - Jozef 1727-1750 county deputy governor
  - Ladislav 1754 military treasurer
  - Jozef 1754 civil treasurer
  - Juraj the younger 1754 chief servant
  - Jozef 1786 military chief state representative
  - Jonáš 1790-1812 county deputy governor
  - Michal 1806 chief servant
- in Zemplín county
  - Pavol 1723 servant, 1729 envoy
  - Ján 1730 servant, 1741 envoy
  - Ján 1792 court judge, 1797 royal councilor and chamberlain, county deputy governor
- in Spiš county
  - Juraj 1764 court judge
  - Mikuláš (†1833) deputy county governor
  - Viktor 1832 clerk of the royal office, 1848 member of the opposition in Spiš County, deputy county governor
- in Novohradská county
  - Peter 1808 servant
  - Mikuláš 1836 court clerk, 1842 and 1861 chief servant
  - Jozef (originally from the Orava branch) 1836 military commissioner, 1842 servant
- in Bihar county
  - Imrich 1805 tabular judge

== Heraldic research ==
The most frequent and popular explanation is that of Ján of Okoličné, who injured his eye and cheek during the Naples campaign of Louis the Great. Combining the words "eye" and "cheek" the phonetic combination 'Oko-licsányi' is created in the Slovak language.

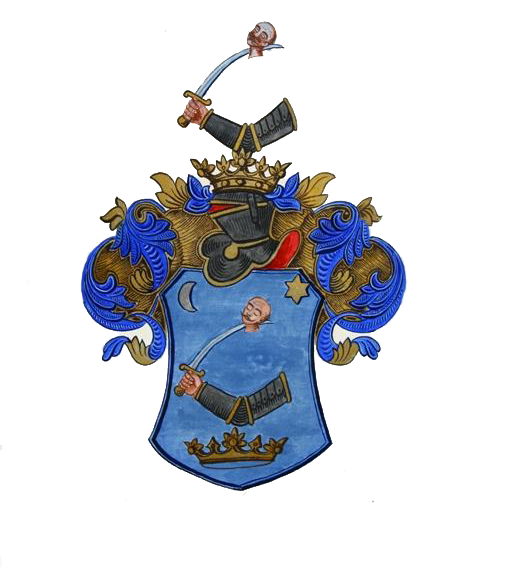

According to I. Nagy, the family probably received the coat of arms mentioned below from Louis I in 1364. The shield with a blue background is complemented by a golden crown, above which is an armored arm with a silver saber with a severed head of a Turk. In the corners of the shield there is a golden star on the right side and a silver crescent on the left side. The differences are in the depiction of the Turk's head. Sometimes the head with a turban is impaled, sometimes it is bare and impaled in the center of the saber. These two variations also alternate in the jewel (in heraldry, an object placed above the helmet above the coat of arms). There are further inconsistencies in the depiction of the jewel. Sometimes the jewel is only the arm from the shield, sometimes also the crescent with a star, which are placed just above the elbow bend. The covers are gold-blue and silver-red.

The coat of arms of the Okolicsányi was studied in the most detail by A. Húščava. He found that the original symbol of the family was a crescent moon and a star, and that at the end of the 16th century these figures were alternately found only as accompanying symbols in the upper corners of the shield. Since the 16th century, the main figure of the coat of arms has become the already mentioned armored arm above the golden crown, holding a silver saber with an impaled Turk's head.

A. Húščava, when analyzing the younger coat of arms of the Okolicsányi, avoids designating the head as the head of a Turk. He describes the main figure literally as follows: "...the arm in the fist holds the golden handle of a saber, which cuts through the left half of the face and the eye from the body of the head separated from the body." In his interpretation, he does not allow the head of a Turk, which has become very widespread in Hungarian heraldry since the 16th century. According to J. Novák, the reason for such a conclusion should be sought in the effort to interpret this symbol more closely. A. Húščava continues in his interpretation as follows: "Even the younger symbol from the 16th century may have its historical justification, rooted in the history of the family from the 14th century. The basis could be the historical fact that in some battle of the Neapolitan expedition of Louis the Great, Ján of Okoličné was seriously wounded (perhaps cut) in the face and as a result of this serious injury he also lost one eye". A. Húščava indirectly concludes here that the younger coat of arms is a telling sign of the Okolicsányi ("eye" and "cheek"). According to J. Novák, it is more likely that this is a symbol of the successful participation of one of the Okolicsányi in the anti-Turkish battles.

Unlike the coat of arms of Bernard (1512) and Ján (1541) The "quartered" coat of arms of the Bratislava and Varadín bishop Ján Okolicsányi († 1736) from 1726 is the most visually striking version of the coat of arms using a crescent and a star - in combination with an arm with a sabre and a severed head. In the first and fourth fields it depicts a crescent and a star, and in the second and third fields an arm with a sabre and a severed head. Pavol Okolicsányi also used a similar coat of arms, but with the order of the fields reversed (with an arm with a sabre and a severed head in the first and fourth fields and a crescent and a star in the second and third fields).

Two shields of arms in the presbytery of the Church of St. Peter of Alcántara depict a shield with a crescent moon and a star on the left (heraldic right) side. This shield was evaluated by A. Húšcava as the original medieval coat of arms of the Okolicsányi. According to the named researcher, the second coat of arms, today filled with painted letters "itb", should originally have had the initials "ilb" or - as today - "itb". According to A. Húšcava, the initials should have referred to Jakub (Iacob), Leonard and Bernard Okolicsányi (sons of the aforementioned Michal). Alternatively, to Jakub, Tomas (the then parish priest) and Bernard. Húšcava's interpretation was recently questioned by Szilárd Papp (2003–2006). According to him, the second shield was originally supposed to have the religious abbreviation IHS, but a survey of the coat of arms (Juraj Maták, 2016) did not provisionally confirm this assumption.

== Popular culture ==
In popular culture, all references to the Okolicsányi family are essentially tied to the early 18th century and the trial of Juraj Jánošík. In the Radišinské naivné divadlo play Jááánošííík (1970), Ladislav Okoličáni appears as a neighbor of the Jánošík family. In the play, this character of "Mr. Count Okoličáni" appears in one scene, in which he hands over a gun to Jánošík - so that he could go and loot - with the words "I'll give him mine, it's still smoking".

In the second part of the film Jánošík (1962), the character of a judge appears in two scenes. In the first scene, Jánošík's retinue beats up a judge who comes to investigate the theft of the count's cows and flour, and in the last scene, the judge passes sentence on the robber. The film Jánošík (1962) was made during period of socialism and is to a certain extent marked by the time of its creation. References to class struggle permeate the plot, and the plot of the film is modified from known facts, which distances it from the realities of the time.

In the book "Legends from Liptov" by authors Peter Vrlík and Peter Mišák, Okolicsányi are mentioned in the stories "The Rescued Monks", "The Hero Ján of Okolica", "St. John's Rose", "The Lord's Whims", "How Jánošík Was Sentenced" and "Jánošík's Grave".

== Gallery ==
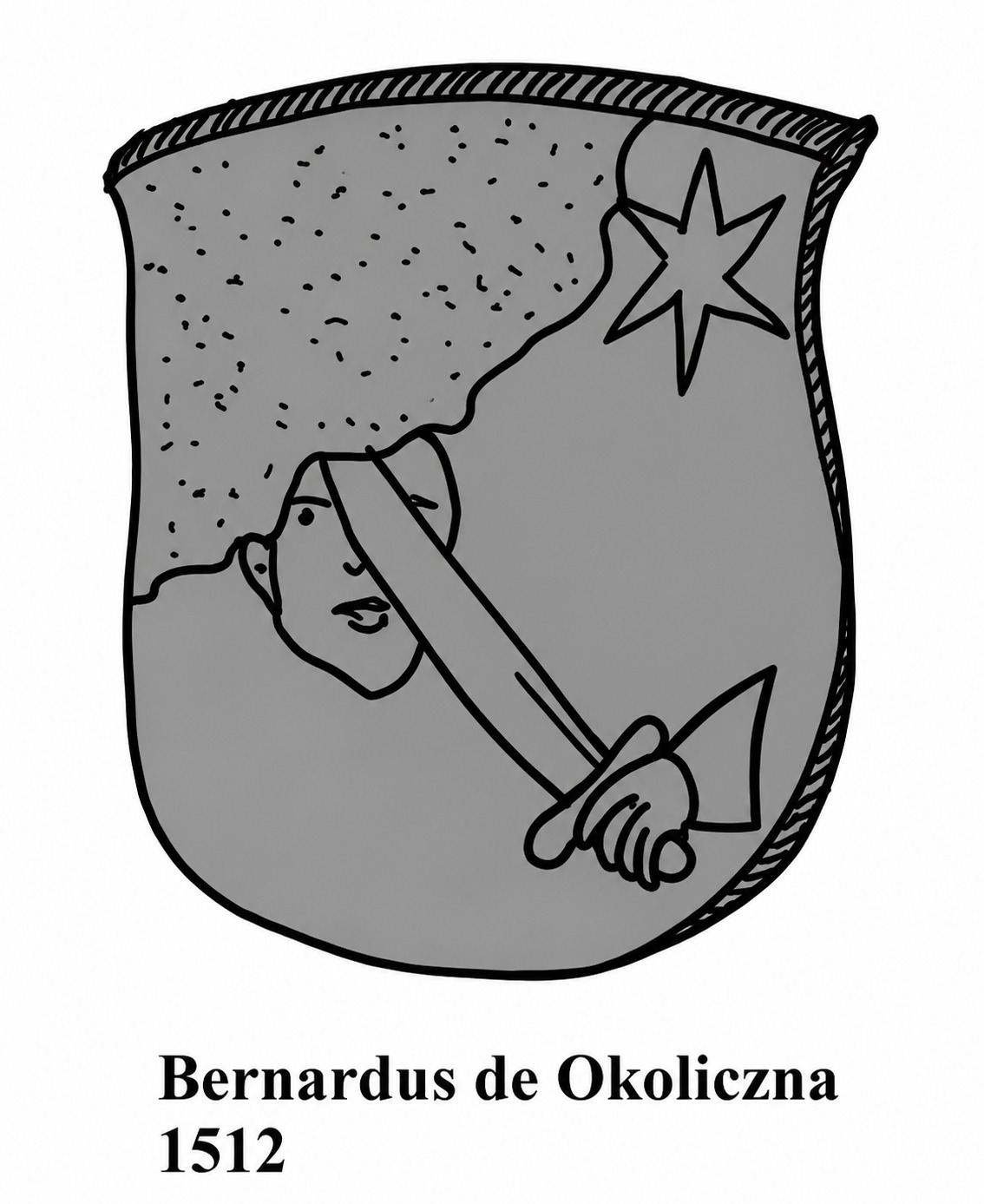

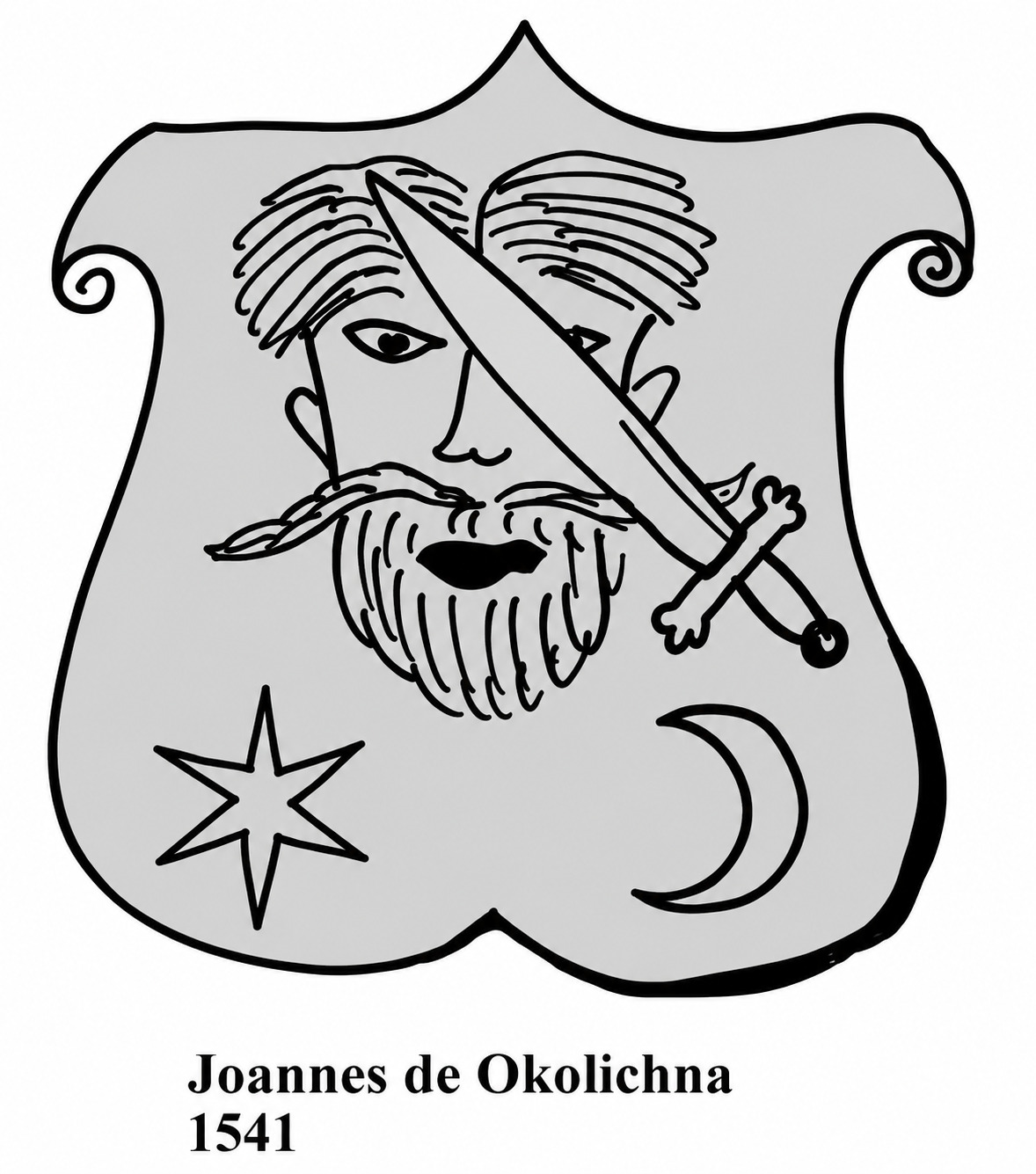

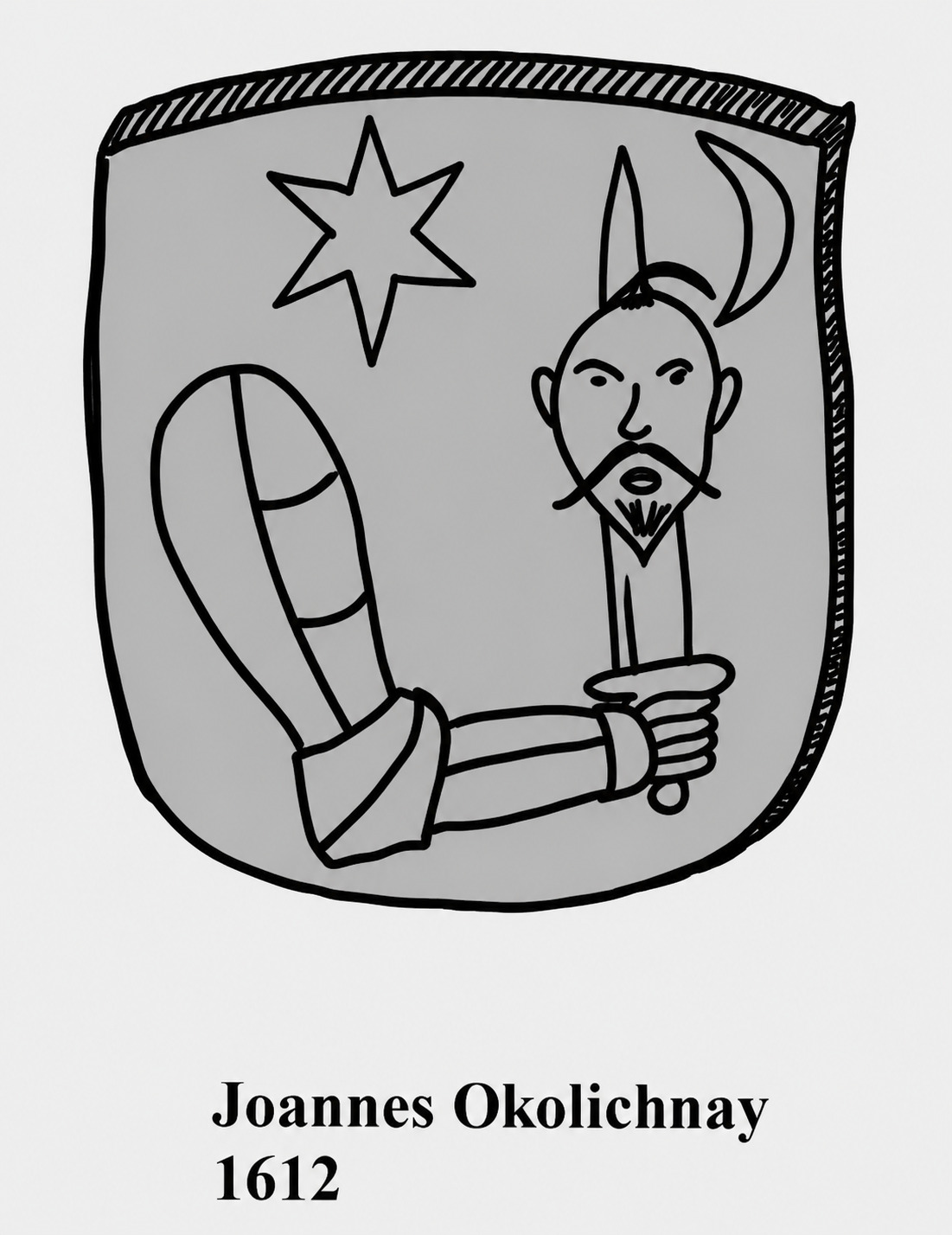

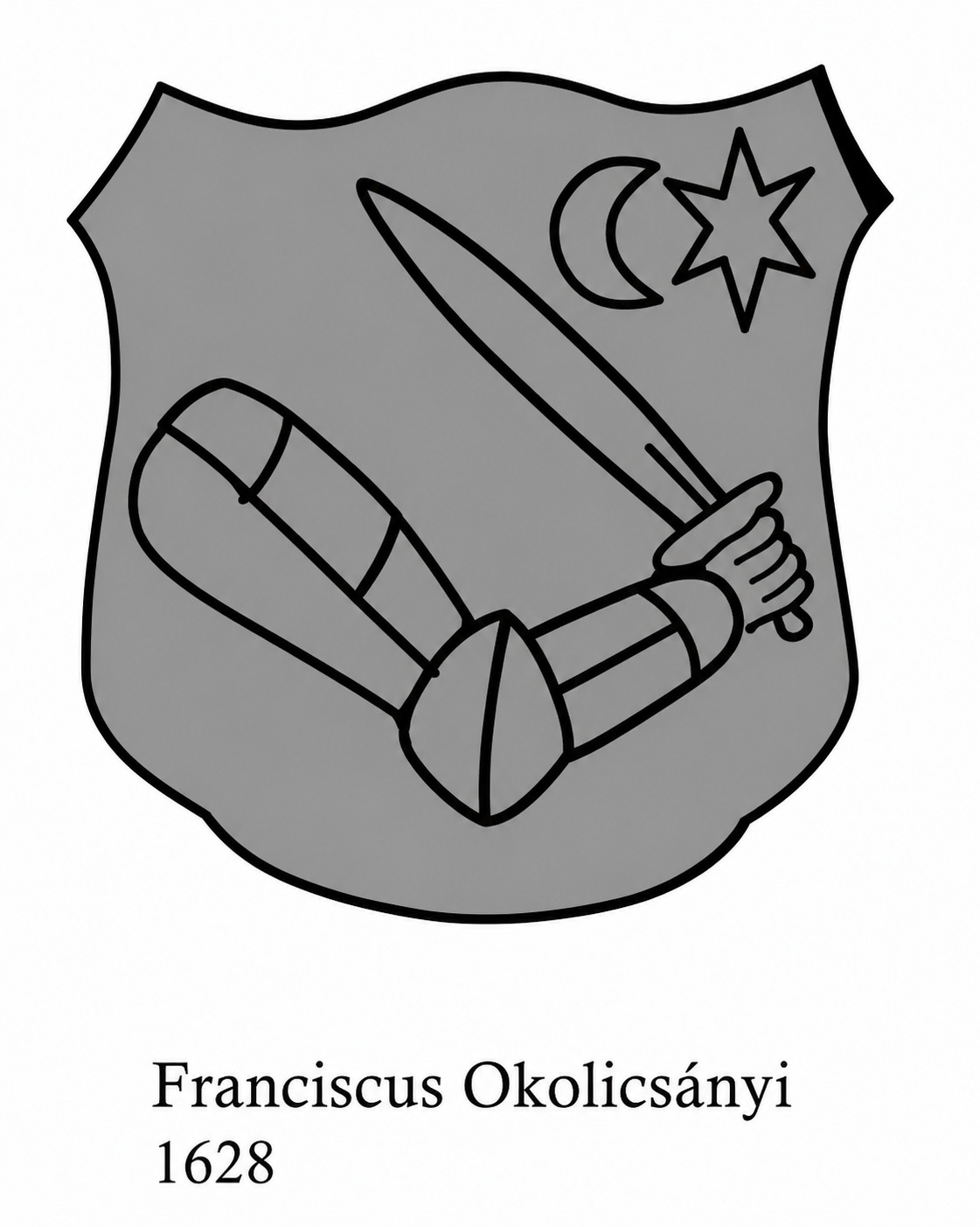

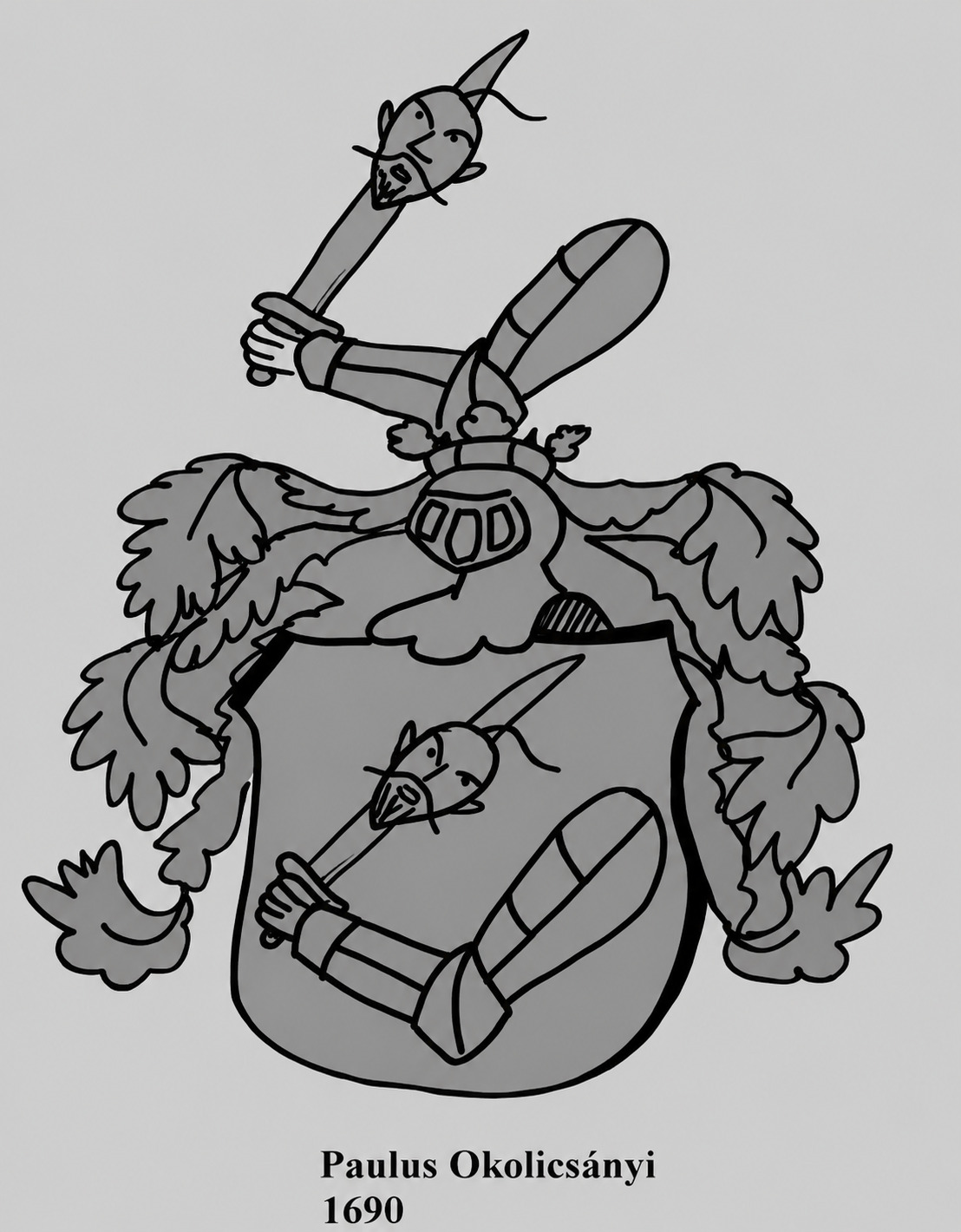

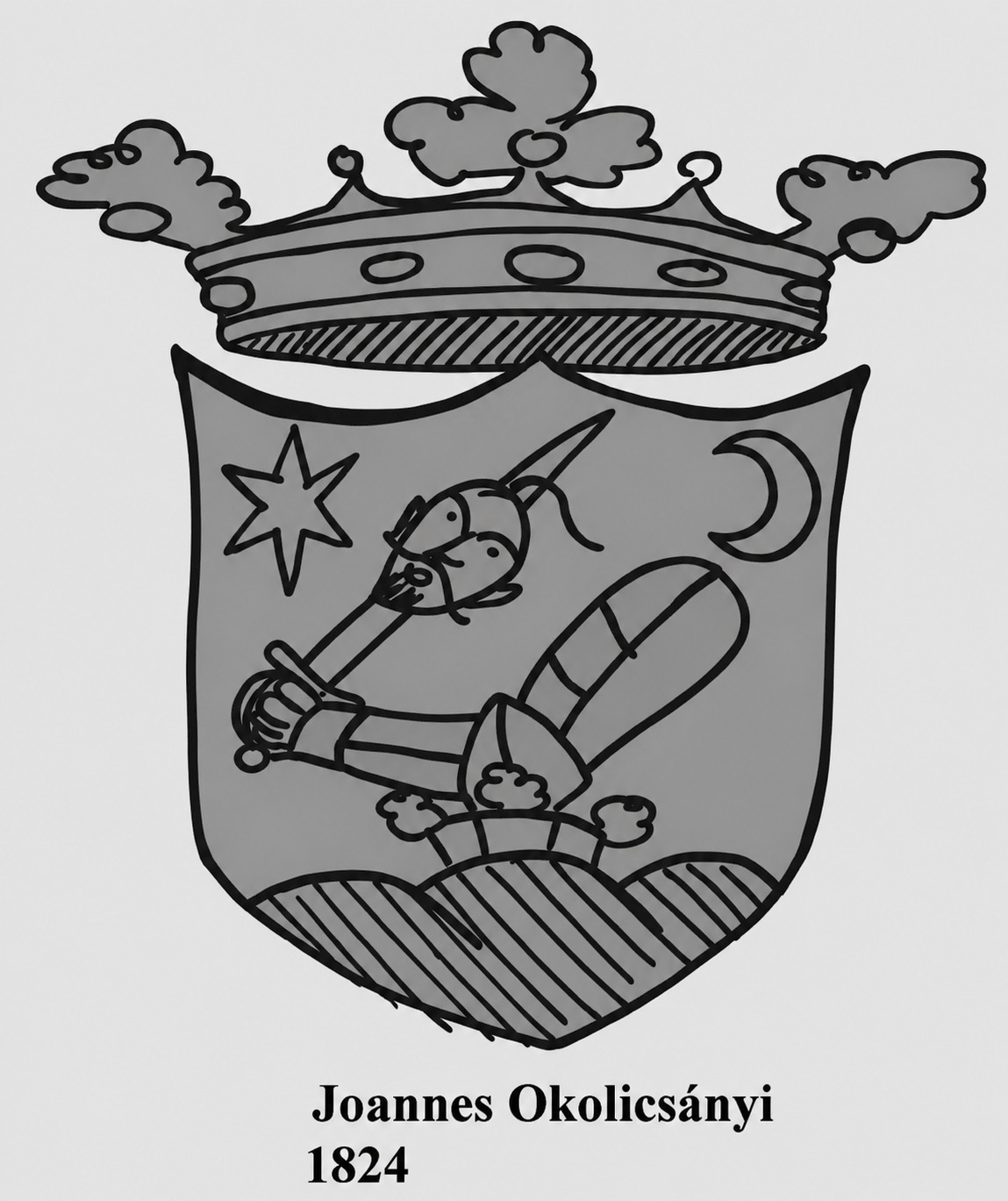

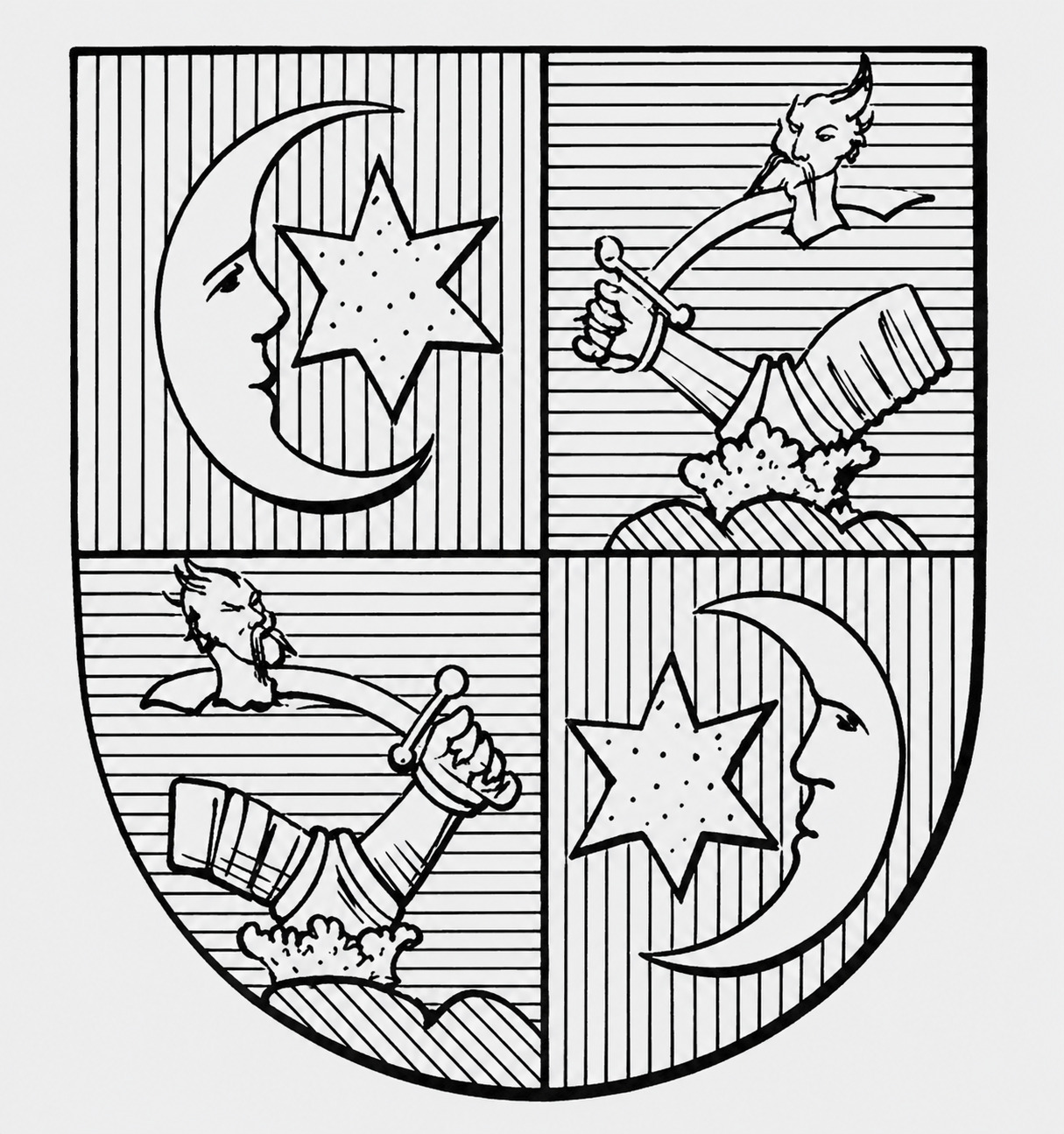
Coat of arms of the Bishop of Bratislava and Varadín, Ján Okolicsányi († 1736) from 1726

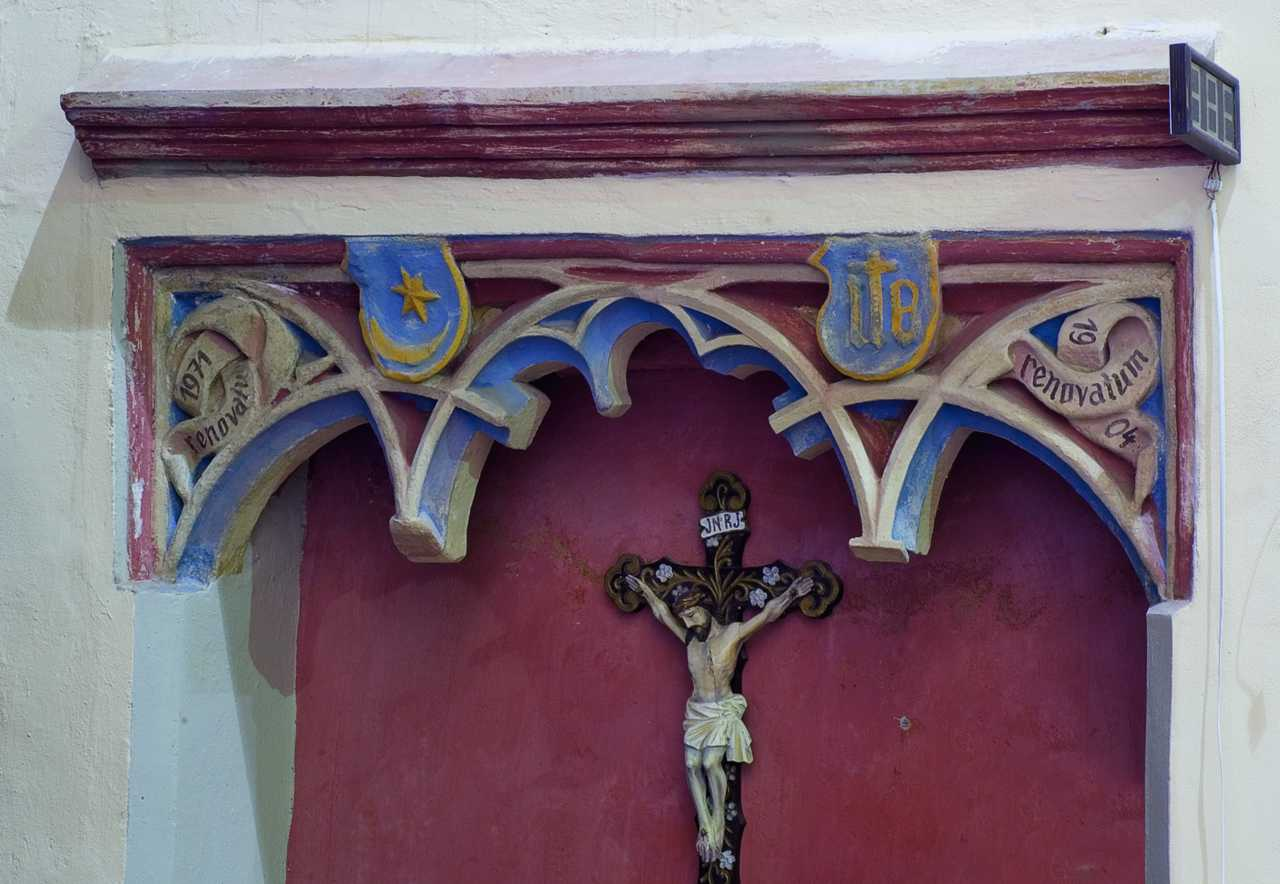
In the Church of Saint Peter of Alcántara

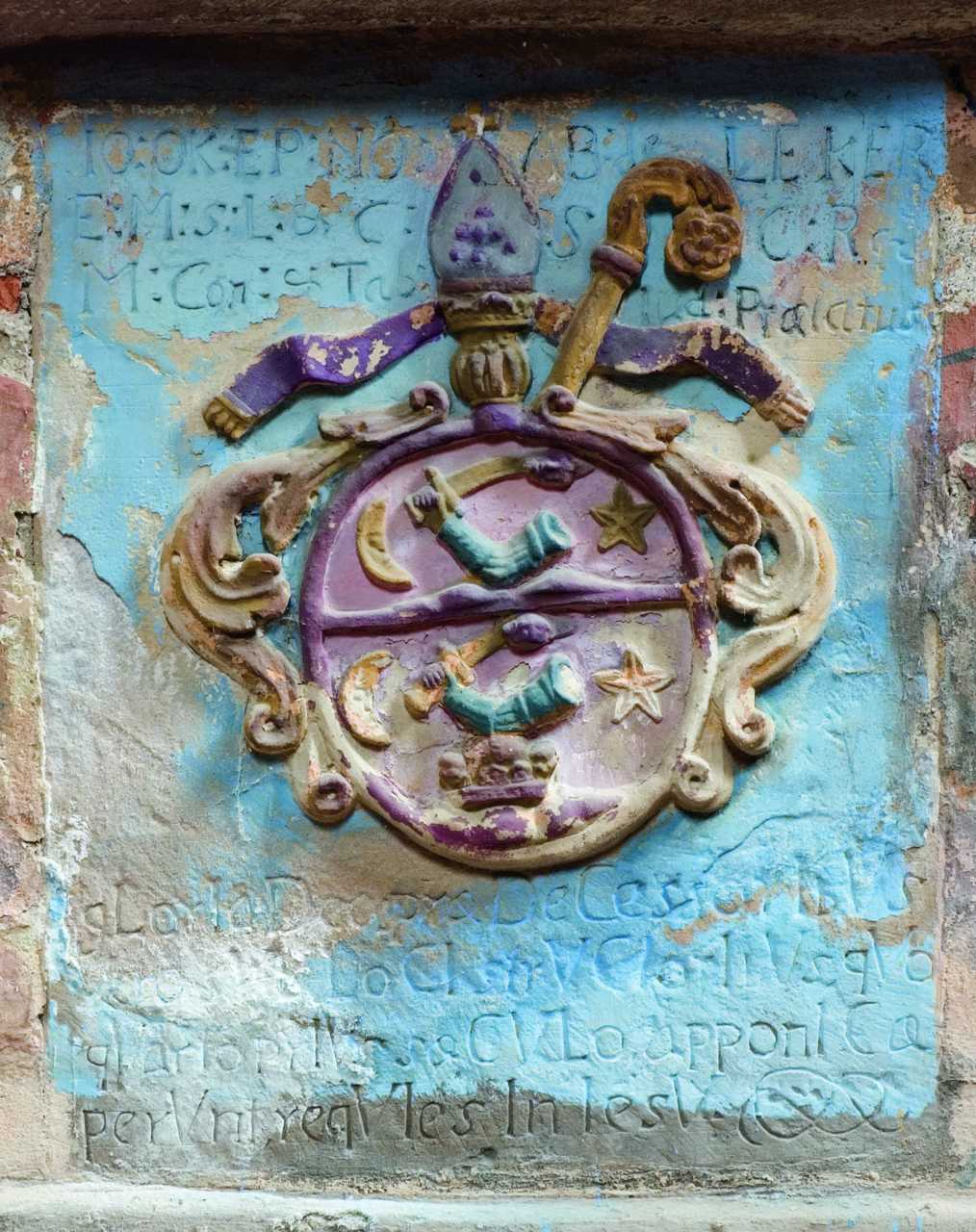
In the Church of Saint Peter of Alcántara

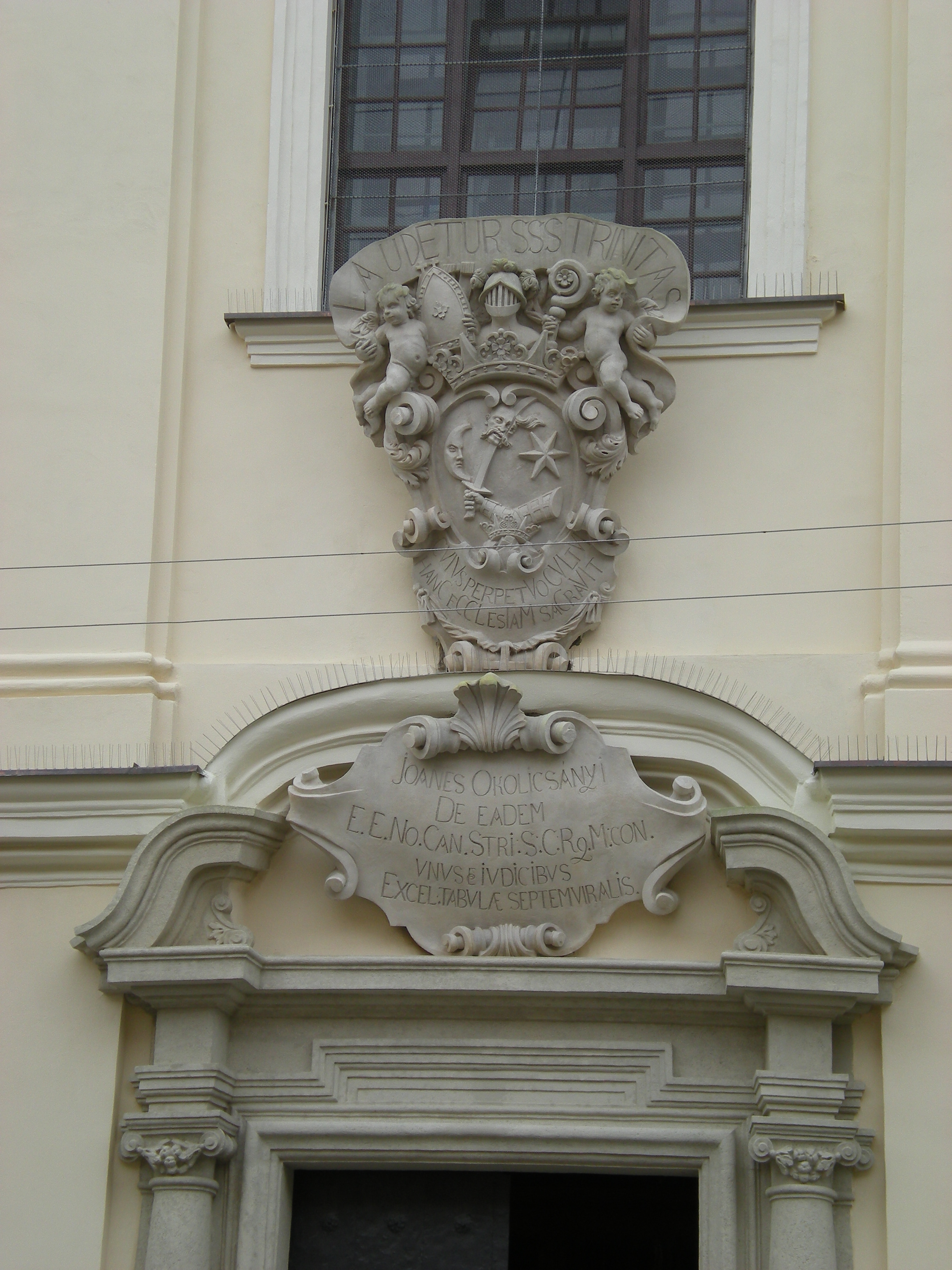
Detail of the portal of the Church of the Holy Trinity (Trnava), Bishop Ján Okolicsányi

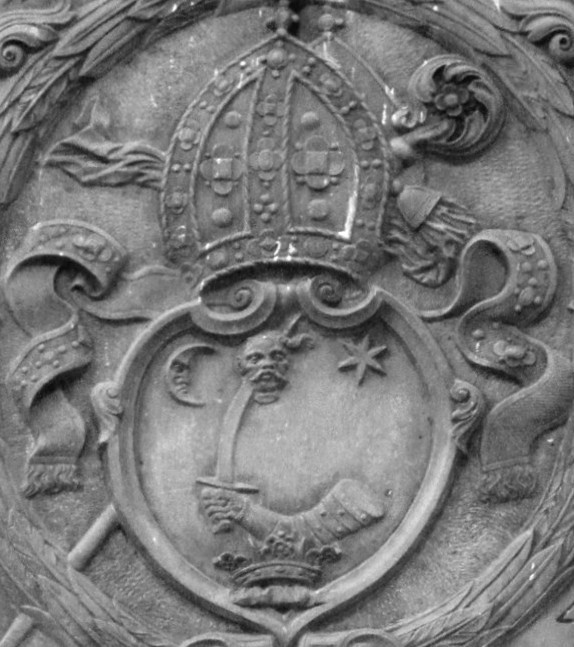
Bishop John Okolicsányi

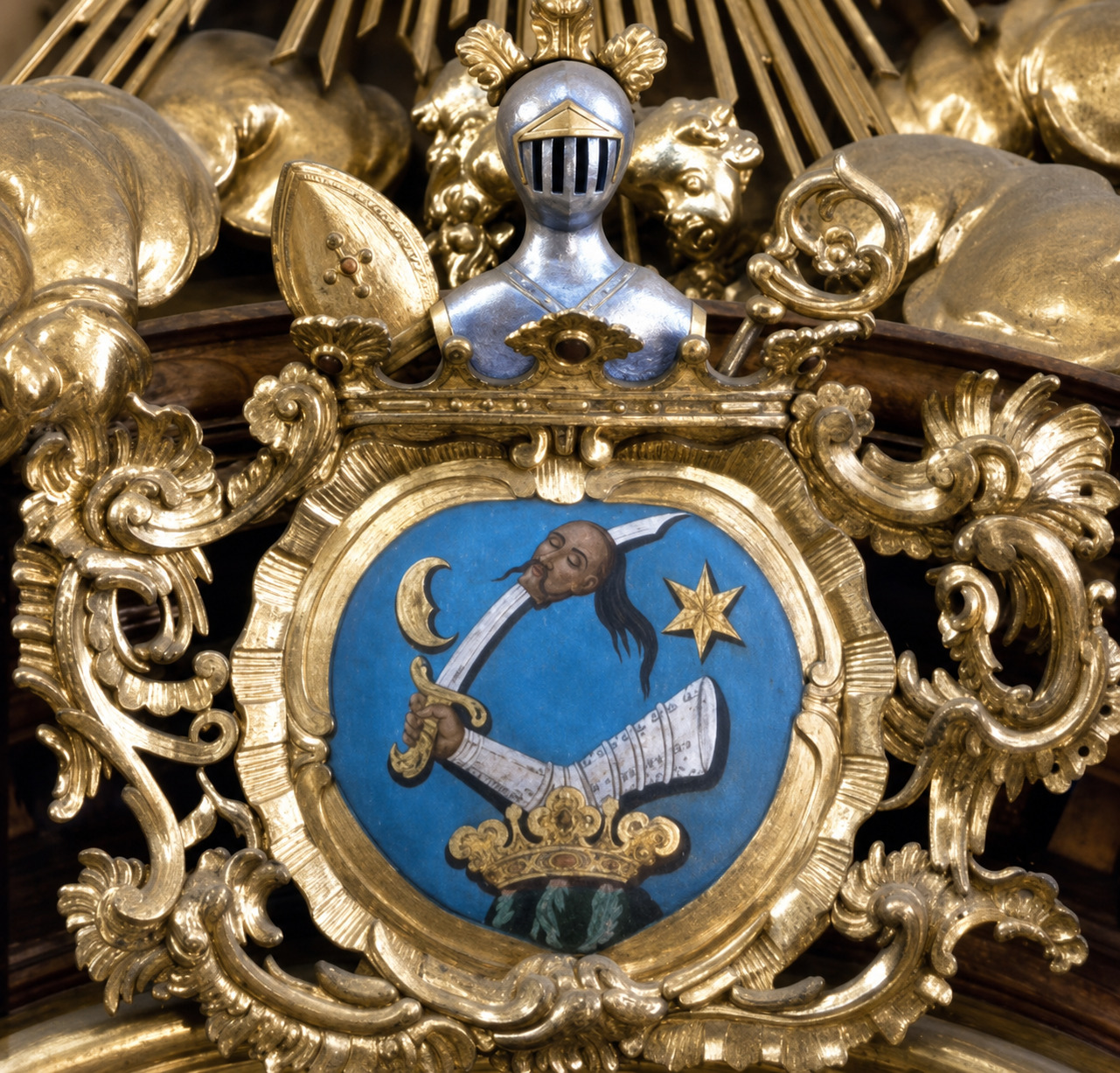
Church of the Holy Trinity (Trnava), Bishop John Okolicsányi 1729

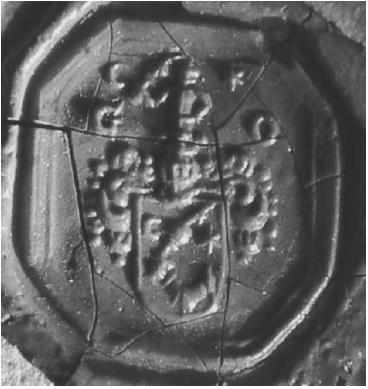
Seal Juraj Okolicsányi 1724

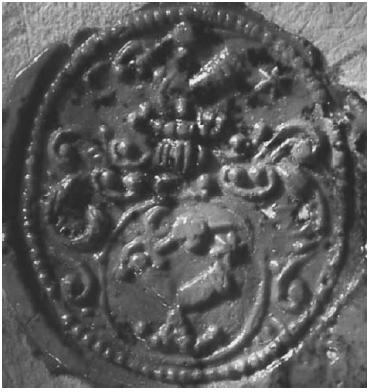
Seal Jónás Okolicsányi 1782

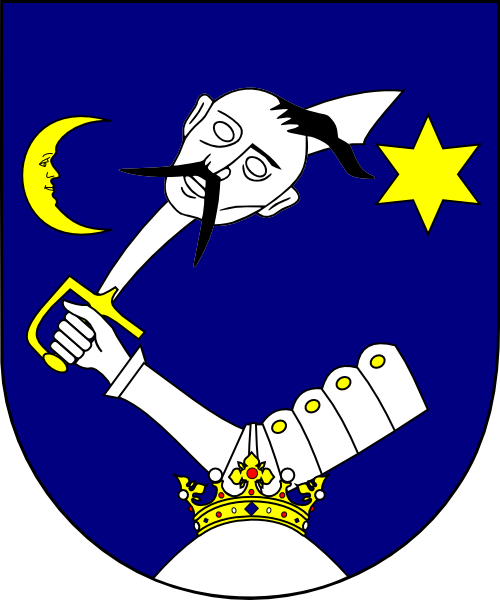
Coat of arms of Ján Okolicsánya, bishop of Oradea Mare, 1735 - 1736

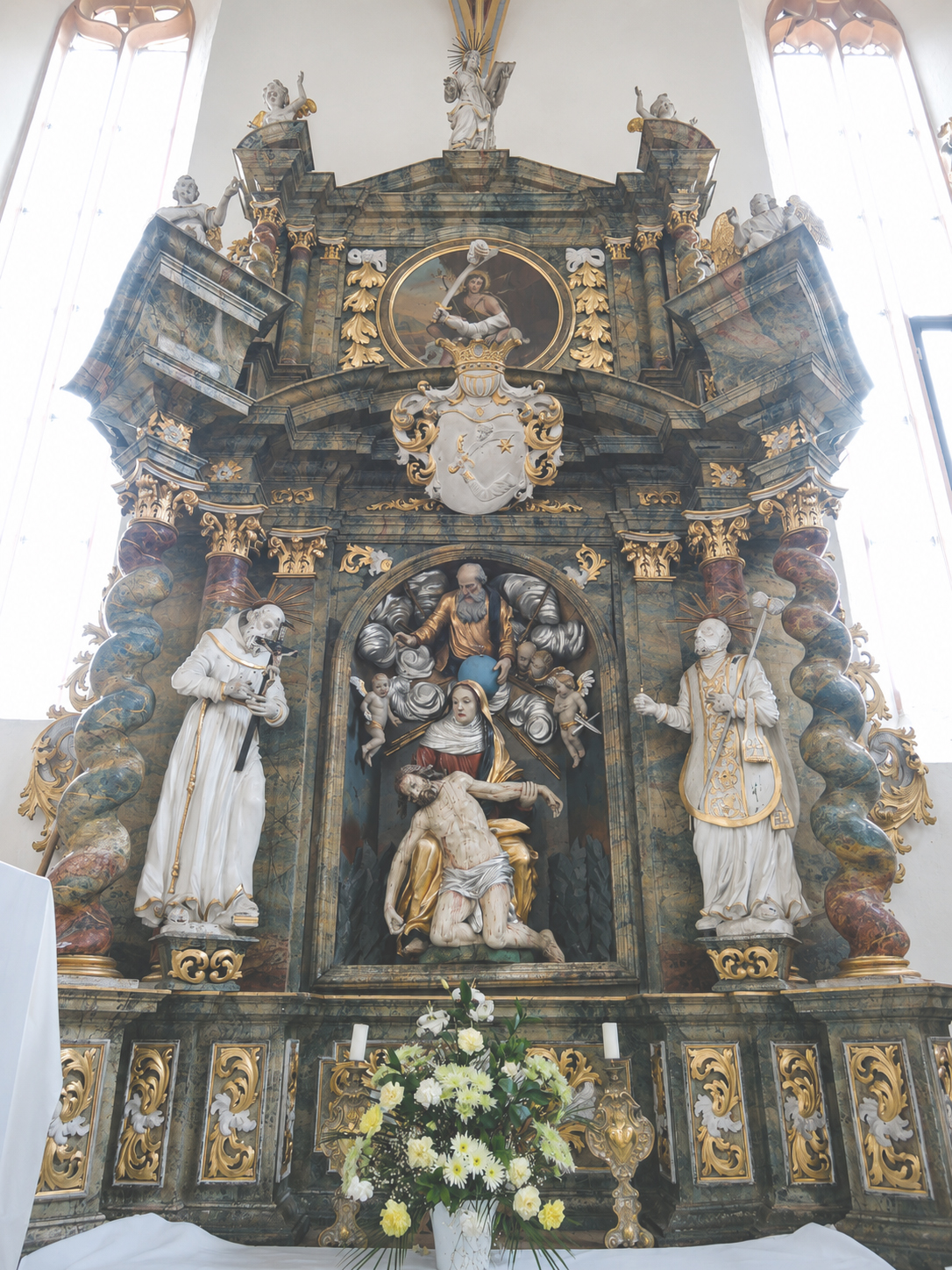
Coat of arms on the altar in the Church of Saint Peter of Alcántara

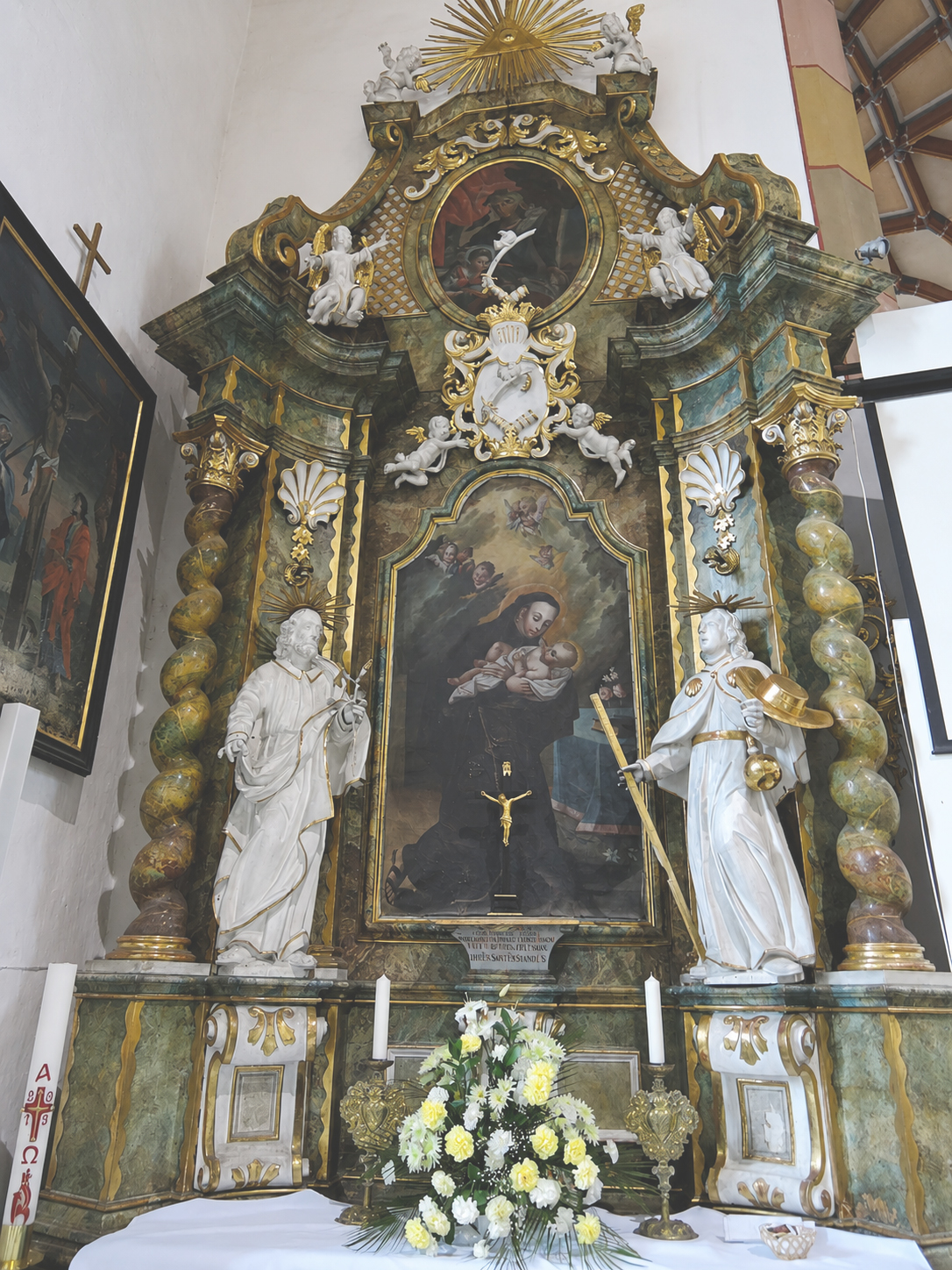
Coat of arms on the altar in the Church of Saint Peter of Alcántara

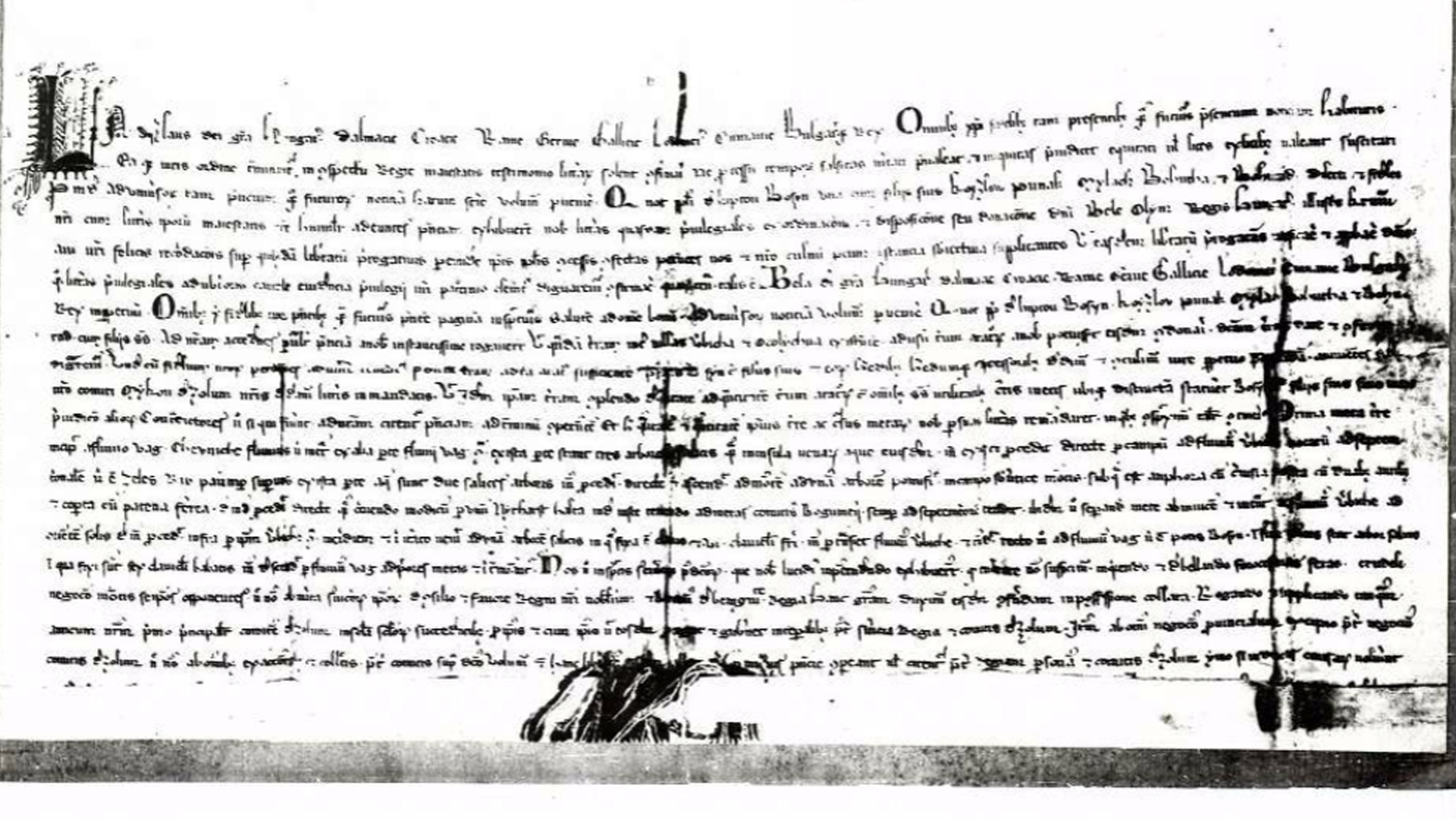
Copy of a transcript of a document from 1276 from the collection of documents of the State Archives in Bytča concerning the Okolicsányi family
