= Stibor of Stiboricz =

Hungarian noble (d. 1414)

- Lord of Beckó
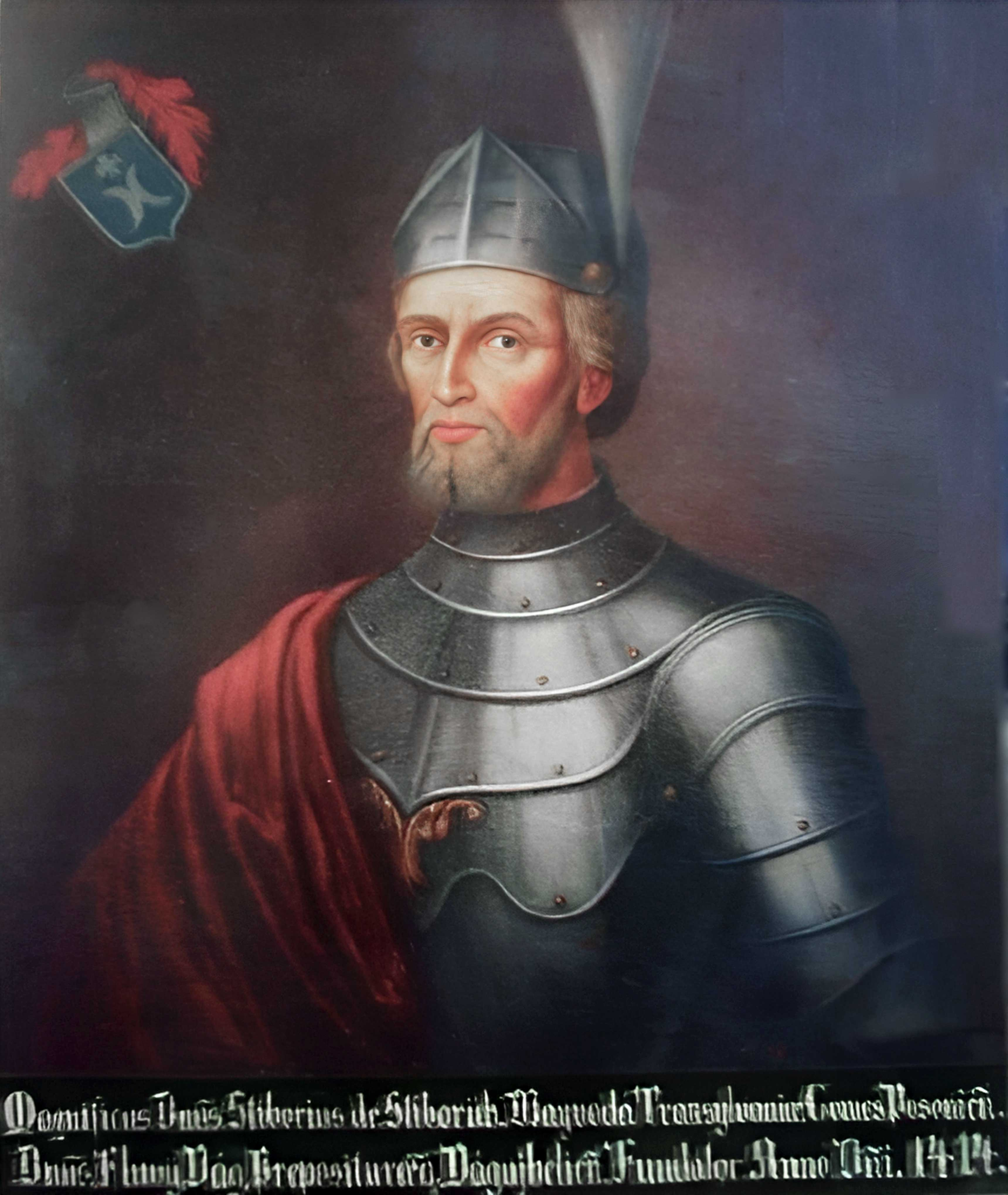
- Late painting of Stibor of Stiboricz

Voivode of Transylvania
- Reign: 1395–1401; 1409–1414
- Predecessor: Frank Szécsényi (1st term); John Tamási & James Lack (2nd term)
- Successor: Simon Szécsényi (1st term); Nicholas Csáki (2nd term)
- Native name: Ścibor ze Ściborzyc
- Born: c. 1348
- Died: February 1414
- Noble family: Clan Ostoja
- Spouse: Dobrochna Stęszewska
- Issue: Stibor II
- Father: Mościc ze Ściborzyc

Stibor of Stiboricz of Ostoja (also written in English as Scibor or Czibor; Polish: Ścibor ze Ściborzyc, Hungarian: Stiborici Stibor, Romanian: Știbor de Știborici, Slovak: Stibor zo Stiboríc; c. 1348 – February 1414) was an aristocrat of Polish origin in the Kingdom of Hungary. He was a close friend of King Sigismund of Hungary who appointed him to several offices during his reign. He was Voivode of Transylvania (present day Romania) from 1395 to 1401 and 1409 to 1414. Stibor styled himself "Lord of the whole Vág", referring to his properties along the 409-km-long river (in present-day Slovakia) where 15 of his 31 castles were situated.

== Early career ==
Coat of arms of Stibor of Stiboricz

== King's advisor ==
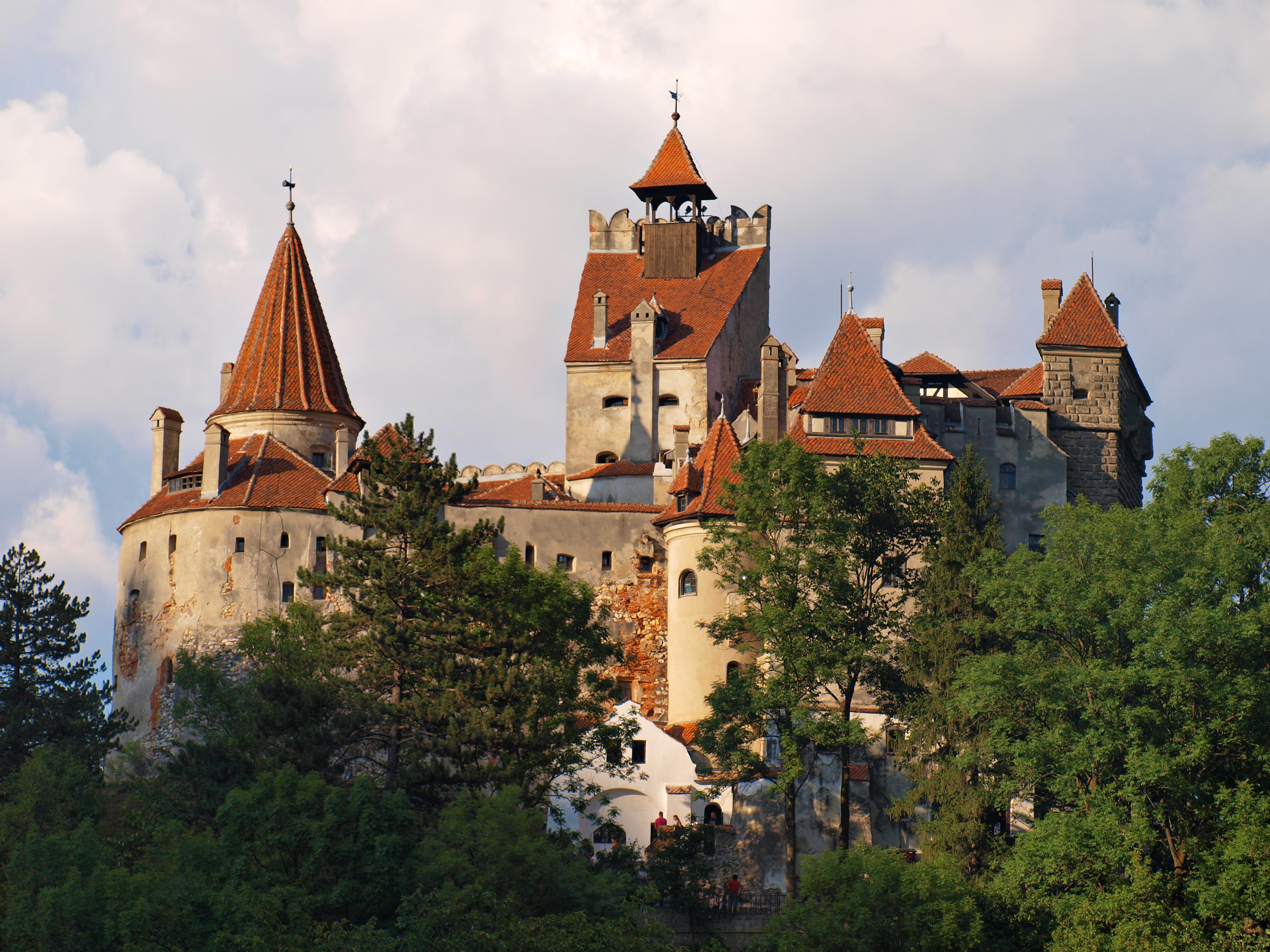
Bran Castle in Transylvania, ruled by Stibor of Stiboricz, commonly named as Dracula's Castle

Stibor was granted the ius indigenatus (the right to hold offices) and became head of the Counties Pozsony (1389), Trencsén and Nyitra (1392). In 1390 he received castles and properties in Vigvar, Torbag and Modor and in 1392 Stibor was granted the possession of land and castles of Csejte, Holics, Berencs, Detrekő, Éleskő, Jókő, Zavar and Korlátkő respectively, in the Kingdom of Hungary. A few years later he expanded his small empire with castles and properties in Dioś, Szomolya, Szent Vid, Suran, Maniga, Baganya, Zuk, Kreesztes, Rarkov, Bary, Koszonic, Rakovitz, Tatkolch, Ratkolch, Ilkaman, and Dévény in Nyitra and Presburg counties. Altogether Stibor of Stiboricz was in possession of 31 castles and over 400 towns and villages which at the time was half of western Slovakia of today.

Again, in 1403, there was uprising against Sigismund led by Archbishop John Kanizsai of Esztergom that offered the Hungarian crown to King Ladislaus of Naples. Stibor recruited then mercenaries, invaded the north-western parts of the Kingdom and defeated the rebels' troops. Again, with the support of Nicholas II Garai and his army that defeated rebels' troops in other part of the Kingdom. The parties made an agreement under which the rebels accepted the King's rule and they were granted a royal pardon on 29 October 1403. Shortly afterwards, the King appointed Stibor to the head of Nyitra county and entrusted him to govern the possessions of the Archdiocese of Esztergom and the Diocese of Eger (1405). Stibor himself entrusted those possessions to close family and members of the Clan of Ostoja.

== Diplomacy ==
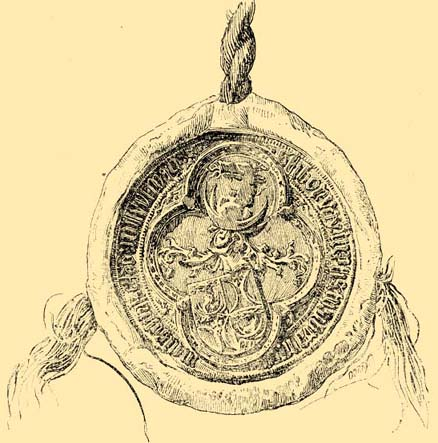
Seal of Stibor

The genius of Stibor of Stiboricz's diplomacy is shown in the work of Wenzel and on this ground, in that of Antoni Prochaska and Daniela Dvorakova. As Sigismund wished to sell Neumark (Brandenburg) in order to reinforce the economy, Stibor set up a plan to make the Teutonic Knights to pay a much higher price than expected, keeping in mind that they would not then be able to finance a bigger army against Poland. Neumark at this time was a troubled land as there was no order and the land was well known to have robber barons terrorizing the population and making the land dangerous to visit. To buy Neumark was to buy problems, a fact of which the Teutonic Knights were very well aware. It is also the reason why they did not hurry to buy the property. On the other hand, Neumark would surround Poland and give the Teutonic Knights protection from being attacked from that side. A problem for the Teutonic Knights arose when they were notified that Stibor was to be in charge of selling Neumark to Poland for a much smaller amount of money. The price was low and not realistic to accept for King Sigismund. But it would be surely to be understood to put pressure on the Teutonic Knights to buy the property since they could not afford to be surrounded by Polish forces from the west.

Agreement was made between Stibor and two powerful Lords in Poland to sell Neumark to Poland. The agreement states that if selling Neumark to Poland would fail, all the properties of those three Lords who signed the agreement would go to the Polish Crown as compensation for the loss. A loss such as that would be remarkably high keeping in mind that Stibor owned almost half of present-day western Slovakia at the time of negotiations. As the Teutonic Knights were forced to buy the land, they also had to pay all the penalty for breaking the agreement with Polish Lords. It is noted in Teutonic books that Stibor was one of their top expenses at the time. The price of Neumark was not just three times higher than its value; the penalty that Stibor took from the Knights was astronomic. Added to this, the problems inside Neumark made it very costly for the Knights to organize the territory. This was the beginning of the end of the power of the Teutonic Knights.

After losing the war in Grunwald year 1410, they had to pay an additional penalty to the Polish Crown to survive. It is significant that all those penalties that had been paid to the Polish Crown as compensation for losses in the Grunwald war, ended in Hungary and the treasury of King Sigismund on the basis of diplomatic work by Stibor of Stiboricz and Zawisza Czarny. In return, Poland gained Spiš that was in the hands of Poland to the time of partition. However, the most significant and amazing information in the documents are about those two Lords that signed the agreement to sell Neumark to Poland. They were Sędziwuj de Szubin, the Duke of Kalisz and Mostko de Staszow, Lord Castellan of Poznan.

The first one was father of Stibor's wife and the second was of Clan of Ostoja family. There are no sources that can confirm that the penalty was ever paid to the Polish Crown, in fact there is no information at all about the agreement in the documents that consider the Crown.

It is remarkable that many of those who were assigned to negotiate between Poland and the Teutonic Knights with Sigismund as a part in negotiations, were members of the Clan of Ostoja, creating a picture of family meetings. It is also possible that Zawisza Czarny also was a relative to the Clan and the fact that he spent much time visiting many castles of the Clan during many years also show a close connection between this famous Black Knight (named so because of wearing black armor) and the Ostoja. Another interesting fact is that King Jogaila was also a member of the Order of the Dragon, the most powerful association of Kings, Dukes, and mighty Knights in Europe at that time. It was a secret society and there was never any member list done at the time. However, all members of this Order formed one political body against the enemy of Christianity (read Ottoman Empire). No member of the Order represented the Teutonic Knights. Secret meetings and agreements between Hungary and Poland and so between the Sigismund and Jogaila, using their most trusted couriers, question wherever there was ever any serious dispute between both ruling Kings. Declaring war against Poland in 1410 was more of a show in order to gain economic advantage from Teutonic Knights, than a real war. The facts remain, Teutonic Knights paid a considerable amount to Sigismund for declaring and attacking Poland from south. The outcome was small piece of land burned down to show the Teutonic Knights some action. The penalty paid by the Teutonic side after losing the Battle of Grunwald was much bigger and was transferred as a loan to Sigismund. All together, the diplomatic game showed on paper that Poland and Hungary were enemies, but in reality they were close friends.

In the end, it was the Clan of Ostoja that was the leading force in breaking down the Teutonic side, they did it not only by using the fine art of the sword but also with outstanding diplomatic skills.

== Last years ==
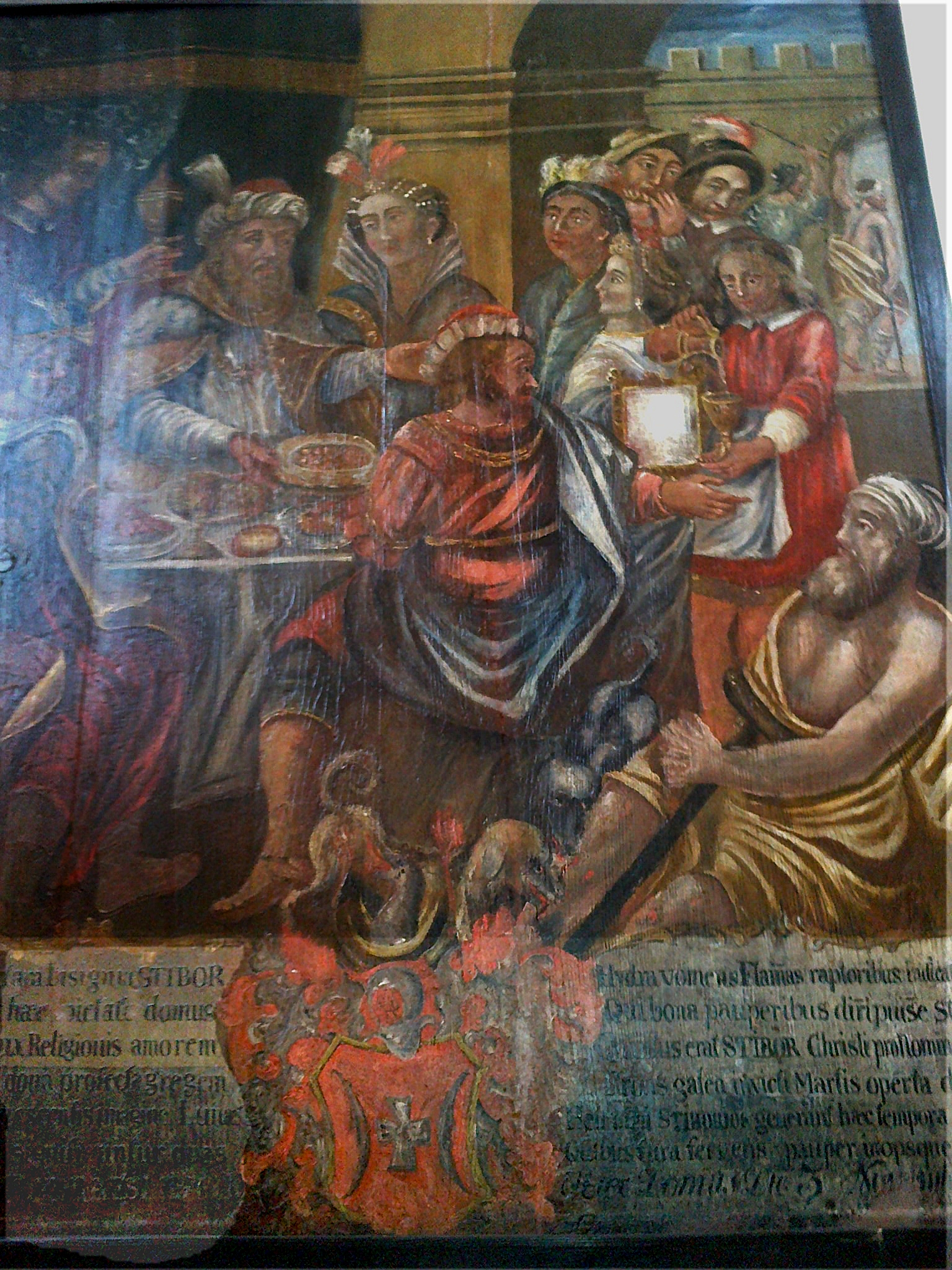
In the name of charity of Stibor's

In 1409, Sigismund signed a treaty with Teutonic Knights which was seen as direct action against Poland and in 1410, Scibor was in charge of the negotiations between Poland and Teutonic Knights on the behalf of Sigismund where Polish side was asked to not attack the Teutonic side. On behalf of Sigismund, Stibor sold Neumark to the Teutonic Knights for a remarkably large sum. This reinforced Sigismund's finances and made it more difficult for the Teutonic Knights to hire mercenaries to fight on their side against the Poles-Lithuanians in Grunwald-Tannenberg.

The Battle of Grunwald took place, with almost all of the Ostojas leaving Hungary to join Polish forces. However, Stibor and his brother Andrzej (Andrew) together with their sons, remained loyal to the Emperor. Instead, Stibor led small the Hungarian army to attack Poland from the South. Because of the diplomatic work of Stibor of Stiboricz, Sigismund abandoned hostile actions against Poland and turned to support the wealthy and mighty Teutonic Knights by signing never executed agreements in to order to gain financial benefit to protect his own Empire for the Ottoman threat. Leading King's army against Poland was mostly marking the support to the Teutonic Knights rather to do any serious damage. Few places have been burned down but Stibor's army did not siege of any stronghold, which Stibor easily could do leading elite army forces and well equipped. After burning down the land of Stary Sącz, Stibor ordered a retreat and headed toward Hungary. Meanwhile, the Polish commander, Jan of Szczekociny, gathered all available forces and set out in pursuit of the enemy. The Polish troops, divided into two groups, crossed the Polish-Hungarian border at Sromowce and Stropków, aiming to encircle the fleeing Hungarians. Soon they caught up with Stibor near Bardejov in Slovakia. Among their ranks was Stibor’s own brother, Mikołaj of Ściborzyce. The Poles routed and slaughtered the Hungarian troops. Stibor fled the battlefield and took refuge in Bardejov.

Stibor's own army included 1,000 well equipped Knights compared to King Sigismund's army of 3,000 Knights, he also was in command of entire army in Transylvania and, as he was one of the richest Lords of the Hungarian empire he could also afford to hire mercenaries if needed.

At the end of 1411, Stibor, his brothers and other members of the Clan of Ostoja were in charge of leading troops to fight against the Republic of Venetia in Friuli. In 1412, Stibor was meeting with Zawisza Czarny (The Black Knight) in his Castle of Lubló (today Stará Ľubovňa), preparing the negotiation between Sigismund and Polish King Vladislav Jogaila, which ended with the Treaty of Lubowla.

Before his death, he set up a collegiate chapter for Augustinians in Vágújhely (today Nové Mesto nad Váhom in Slovakia).

== Family ==
With his wife, Dobrohna Stęszewska, he had a son, also named Stibor (Stibor de Beckov), who inherited his land and castles, and added to them with additional properties in Moravia and Germany. They also had a two daughters, Rachna, who married the Polish Lord Andrew Ossoliński and Anna - Jachna who married to the ban László Újlaki. Jachna was a mother of last Bosnian King, Nicholas of Ilok. Stibor of Stiboricz's two brothers, Andrew and Nicholas, and their sons, also held high offices, land and castles in the northern region of the Kingdom of Hungary, as well as lesser holdings in Poland. Son of Nicholas, Nicholas Szarlejski was one of the most powerful and wealthy Lords in Poland, leading the Polish army in Prussia.

The majority of the Clan of Ostoja lived in Poland. It is not established which lines of the Clan are blood related to Stibors in Hungary.

| Stibor line of Ostoja | Family relation | Other information |
|---|---|---|
| Stibor of Stiboricz | Son of Moscic Stiboricz, Voivode of Gniewkowo | Duke of Transylvania, Ispan of five Counties, owner of 31 castles and over 300 towns and villages. Married Dobrochna, daughter of Sędziwoj of Szubin (of Pałuka Clan), one of the most influential Lords in Poland, Magnus Procurator of Poland 1380 |
| Stibor of Beckov | Son of Stibor Stiboricz | Inherited all the land and castles from his father, added Orava Castle |
| Anna (Jachna) of Stiboricz | Daughter of Stibor of Stiboricz | Married to Ladislaus of Llok, Ban of Mačva. Their son, Nicholas of Ilok become King of Bosnia in 1471. |
| Radochna Stiboric | Daughter of Stibor of Stiboricz | Married Andrzej Balicki, member of the Order of the Dragon |
| Katarina de Beckov | Daughter of Stibor de Beckov, married to Pál Bánffy | Received 25% of all the land value including Beckov Castle in cash |
| Marcin of Stiboricz | Brother of Stibor of Stiboricz | Canon of Płock |
| Zofia of Stiboricz | Sister of Stibor of Stiboricz | Married Przedpelek of Steszew |
| Hugon | Son of Zofia of Stiboricz | Introduced in Hungary by Stibor of Stiboricz, in possession of big land area in Racza region in Croatia after marriage with daughter to wealthy Hungarian Lord |
| Moscic | Son of Zofia of Stiboricz | Introduced by Stibor of Stiboricz, received Šintava (Sempte) Castle from King Sigismund |
| Mikolaj Bygdoski of Stiboricz | Oldest brother of Stibor of Stiboricz | Lord in Poland, Castellan of Bydgoszcz. Baron in Hungary where he received Castle of Košeca from King Sigismund. Diplomat of the behalf of Jogaila (King of Poland) in negotiations with King Sigismund |
| Stibor Stiboric Jadrzny of Roznatow | Son of Mikolaj Bydgoski | Castellan of Dobrá Voda, received the Castle of Dobrá Voda from Stibor Stiboric of Beckov |
| Mikolaj Szarlejski | Son of Mikolaj Bydgoski. | Supreme Commander of Royal Forces in Prussia, leading Polish army in order to take back family possessions in Hungary. Voivode of Brzesk and Kujawy 1457, Lord Castellen of Inowroclaw 1438, Lord of regality (starosta) of Bydgoszcz 1441, Count of Tucholsk 1454 and of brodnica of Brodnica, Lord of regality of and Gniewkowo, member of the Prussian Confederation. |
| Andrzej Podczaszy of Stiboricz | Voivode and Castellan of Trencsén, received from Stibor the Castle of Ugróc (Brother of Stibor of Stiboricz | |
| Stibor de minori Stiboric | Son of Andrzej Podczaszy | Bishop of Roman Catholic Archdiocese of Eger |
| Moscic Stiboric | Son of Andrzej Podczaszy of Stiboricz | |
| Wawrzyniec Leski vel de Lieskovo | Close family of Stibor of Stiboricz | |
| Stefan de Lieskovo | Son of Wawrzyniec Leski | Castellan of Košecy (Kazza) 1407, Ispan of Trencen 1415, Lord of Ladce, Horné and Dolné Kočkovce, Nosice i Milochov |
| Piotr, Jakub, Jana, Stanisław, Władysław and Stefan | All of them sons of Stefan de Liesková of Wawrzyniec line | Divided properties among them |

== Legend ==
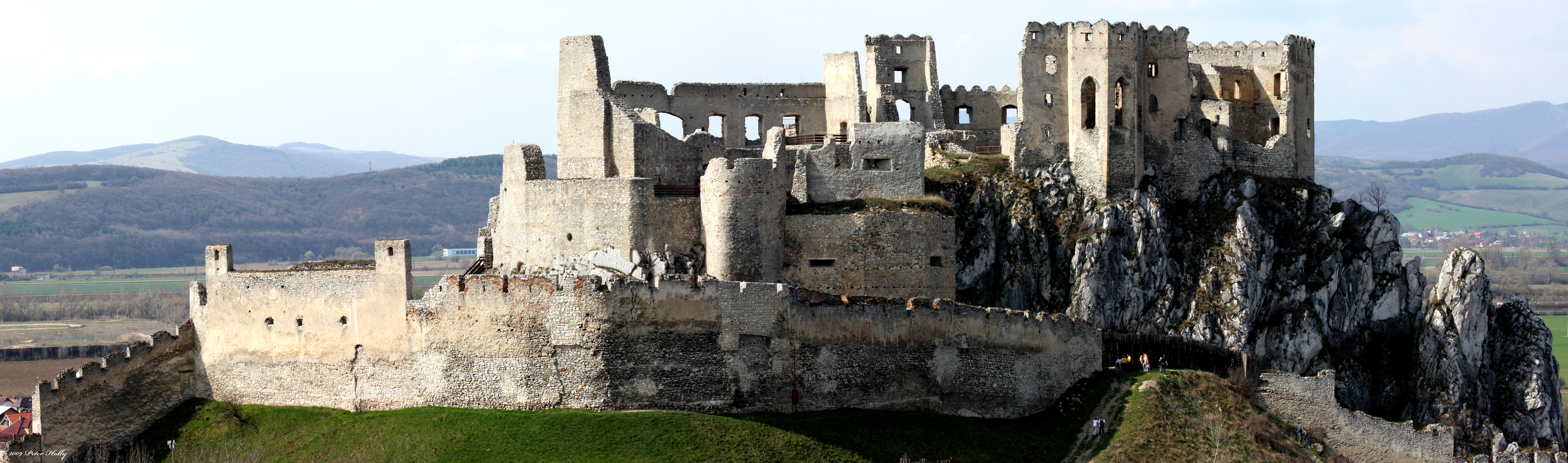
Beckov Castle, home of Stibor Stiboricz of Beckov

Stibor is featured in a what appears to be an historically counterfactual narrative regarding the origins of Beckov Castle at the request of a legendary jester, named Becko, and Stibor's sudden death, falling from the castle walls after being startled and blinded by a snake.

== See also ==
- Clan of Ostoja
- Ostoja coat of arms
- Mikołaj Błociszewski

== Sources ==
- Engel, Pál: Magyarország világi archontológiája (1301–1457) (The Temporal Archontology of Hungary (1301-1457)); História - MTA Történettudományi Intézete, 1996, Budapest; ISBN 963-8312-43-2.
- Markó, László: A magyar állam főméltóságai Szent Istvántól napjainkig - Életrajzi Lexikon (The High Officers of the Hungarian State from Saint Stephen to the Present Days - A Biographical Encyclopedia); Magyar Könyvklub, 2000, Budapest; ISBN 963-547-085-1.
- Mályusz, Elemér: Zsigmond király uralma Magyarországon (King Sigismund's reign in Hungary); Gondolat, 1984; ISBN 963-281-414-2.
- Dvořáková, Daniela : Rytier a jeho kráľ. Stibor zo Stiboríc a Žigmund Lucemburský. Budmerice, Vydavatel'stvo Rak 2003, ISBN 978-80-85501-25-4
- A. Prochaska, Scibor ze Sciborzyc, Roczniki Tow. Nauk. w Tor., R19: 1912
- Gusztáv Wenzel: Stibor vajda, Budapest 1874
- Mályusz, Elemér: Zsigmond király uralma Magyarországon (King Sigismund's reign in Hungary); Gondolat, 1984; ISBN 963-281-414-2
- László: A magyar állam főméltóságai Szent Istvántól napjainkig - Életrajzi Lexikon (The High Officers of the Hungarian State from Saint Stephen to the Present Days - A Biographical Encyclopedia); Magyar Könyvklub, 2000, Budapest; ISBN 963-547-085-1
- Sroka, Stanislaw A. : Scibor ze Sciborzyc. Rys biograficzny. In: Polska i jej sasiedzi w póznym sredniowieczu. Kraków, Towarzystwo Naukowe "Societas Vistulana" 2000
- Bogyay, Thomas von. "Drachenorden." In: Lexikon des Mittelalters 3. Munich, 1986

Stibor (I) of Stiboricz Clan of Ostoja Born: c. 1348 Died: February 1414
Political offices
| Preceded by John Kaplai | Voivode of Rus'; 1387 | Succeeded by Polish Crown |
| Preceded by Frank Szécsényi | Voivode of Transylvania; 1395–1401 | Succeeded by Simon Szécsényi |
| Preceded by John Tamási & James Lack | Voivode of Transylvania; 1409–1414 | Succeeded by Nicholas Csáki |
