= Housing complex Unitas =

- Bytový komplex Unitas
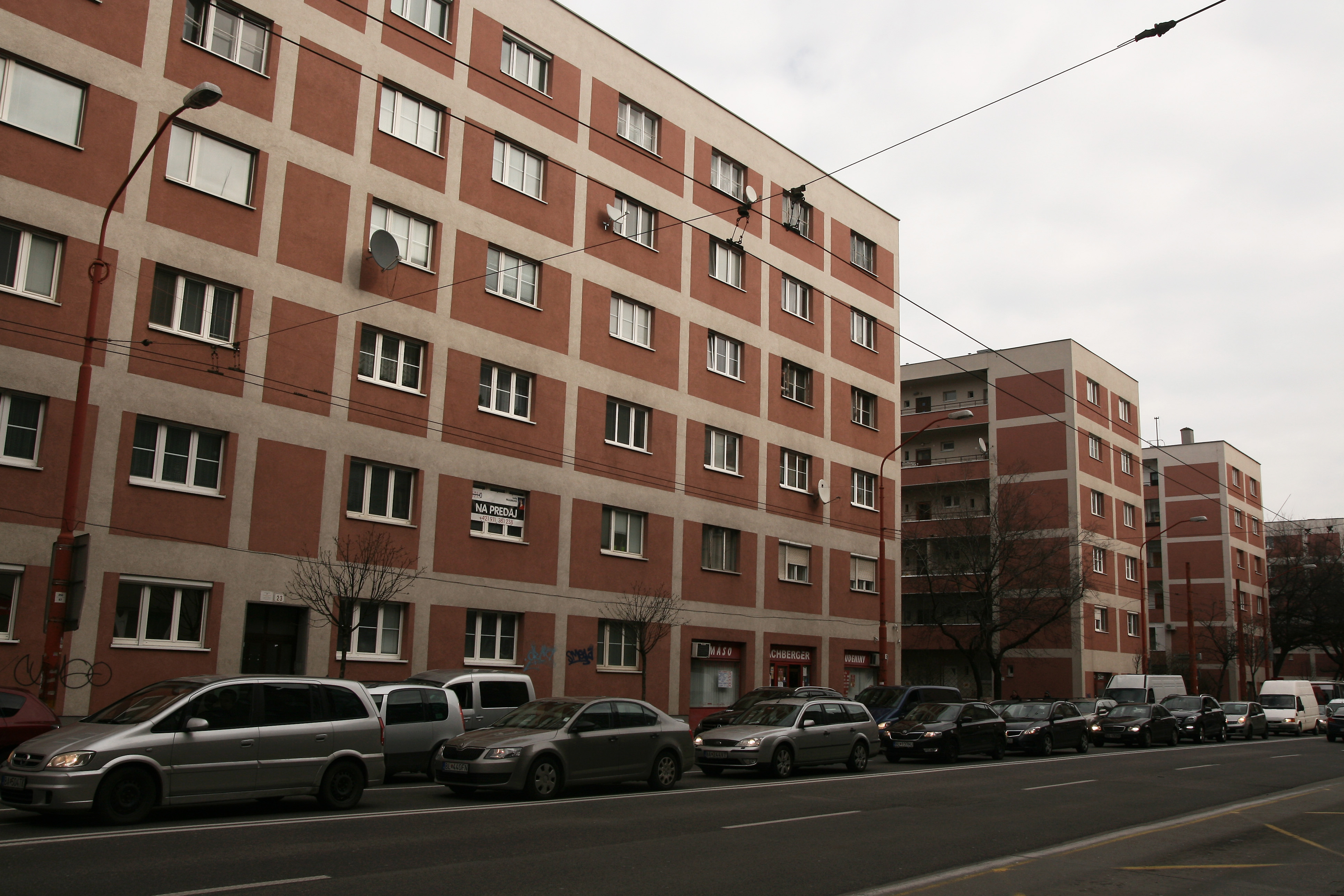
- Interactive map of the Housing complex Unitas area

General information
- Architectural style: modernism
- Location: Šancová 3573/29, Bratislava
- Coordinates: 48.158°N 17.123°E
- Construction started: 1931

Housing complex Unitas are open gallery–type apartment complex designed by architects Fridrich Weinwurm and Ignác Vécsei. Built in the beginning of the thirties by the city of Bratislava for the underprivileged. It comprises seven objects in a row estate, with austere architectural forms, so characteristic of Weinwurm's puristic work. Initially, it was planned as collective housing project, but the idea of collective kitchen and other shared space was abandoned.

Each dwelling is accessible from a balcony oriented to the north - at end of each are the two-room dwellings (50 of them altogether), the oneroom being in the middle (240). Each of the houses has two staircases. The architects have formerly devised built-in furniture and light interior accessories made of steel pipes. Yet, this plan hasn't been carried out. At the time of its creation, this complex was a rare example of functionalist principles applied to a housing project in Slovakia.
