= Nová doba Estate =

Residential complex in Bratislava, Slovakia

Coordinates: 48°9′52.702″N 17°08′6.581″E

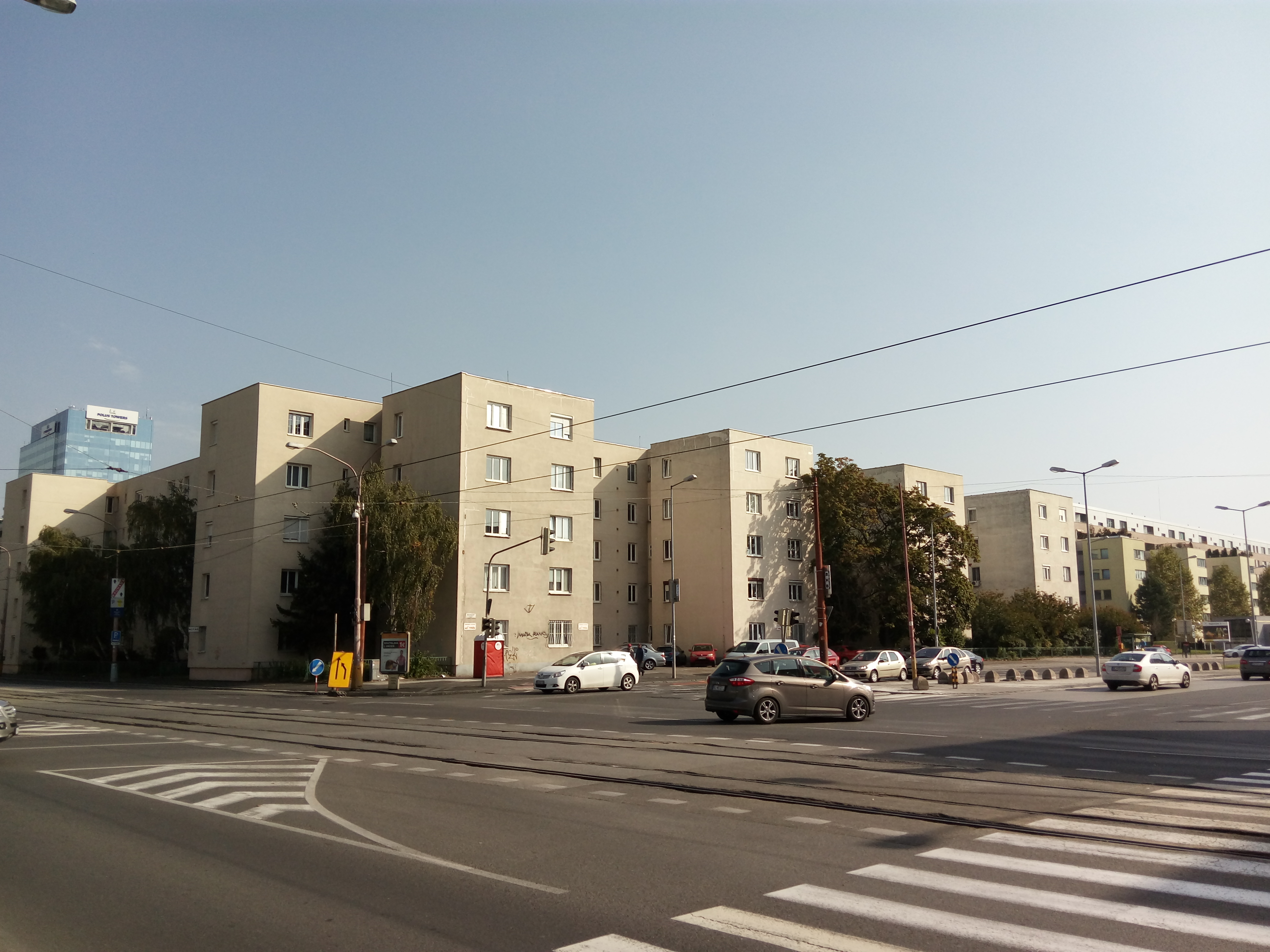
Photograph of one part of the Nová doba Estate

The Nová doba (New Times) Estate is a residential complex at Vajnorská Street in Bratislava, Slovakia. It was built in 1932 according to the plans of architects Fridrich Weinwurm (1885–1942) and Ignác Vécsei (1883–1944). The complex is an excellent example of the new urban, technical and economic approach being taken to solve the social housing problems. The work is connected with the socialist concept of the minimum dwelling (Karel Teige, 1932) and is also close to the ideas of functionalism.
