= Víťazoslav Cintula =

Slovak geographer (1848–1911)

- Born: 22 March 1848; Borský Mikuláš, Kingdom of Hungary, Austrian Empire
- Died: 22 March 1911 (aged 63); Prague, Austria-Hungary
- Burial place: Vinohrady Cemetery
- Education: Charles University; University of Vienna
- Occupation: Geographer
- Spouse: Víťazoslava Cintulová
- Children: Anna, Libuše, Marie, Božena, Kamila

Víťazoslav Cintula (Hungarian: Czintula Gejza; 4 March 1848 – 22 March 1911) was a Slovak cartographer and encyclopedist.

== Biography ==
=== Early life and education ===
Víťazoslav Cintula was born on 4 March 1848 in the village of Borský Mikuláš into a gentry family. Like many members of the Hungarian low nobility, his father Ján Cintula worked in local administration. His mother Anna née Pokorná was a daughter of a wealthy landowner from a nearby village of Radošovce. While Viťazoslav was still a child, his father died, leaving his mother to take care of him and his four siblings alone.

Cintula's early education took place in the local school. Between 1860 and 1866, he studied at the gymnasium in Trnava before eventually graduating from a gymnasium in Esztergom in 1868. Originally, he intended to study theology but due to persecution he suffered due to his Slovak nationality from Hungarian professors at Esztergom, he opted to instead study geography at the Charles University in Prague. There are differing accounts of his living standard at the time. On one hand, Cintula send a letter to the writer Viliam Pauliny-Tóth in December 1868, pleading for financial support due to being raised by his mother alone. On the other hand, other accounts confirm Cintula was able to provide financial support to his fellow Slovak students in the Czech lands, including Vavro Šrobár who, after Cintula's death, played a crucial role in establishment of independent Czechoslovakia. After completing his military service, he also studied at the University of Vienna, where he obtained a doctorate in 1874, which entitled him to teach geography and history at a gymnasium in the German language. Later, he extended his qualifications in Prague to be also able to teach in Czech.

=== Academic career ===
From 1878 to 1888, Cintula taught at the gymnasium in Přerov. During this time, he married Vítězoslava (née Brdlíková; 1853–1930), a daughter of the factory owner Leopold Brdlík from Počátky. Together, they had five daughters: Anna, Libuše, Marie, Božena and Kamila. While teaching in Přerov, Cintula published maps of ethnic composition of Hungary based on the 1900 census as well as maps of various regions of Austria-Hungary. He was a member of the Czech Geographic Society and contributed several articles related to geography to the Otto's Encyclopedia. Cintula also maintained regular correspondence with Slovaks intellectuals of the Matica slovenská and his brother Gustav, who was a parish priest at the village of Špačince.

=== Final years ===
In 1878, Cintula was recalled to the army, which needed educated offices for the Austro-Hungarian campaign in Bosnia and Herzegovina in 1878. While in the army, Cintula started suffering from stomach ulcers, which plagued him for the rest of his life. After his military service, he taught at a gymnasium in Německý Brod until 1904 and then for a year at a real school in Prague. In 1905, Cintula retired.

== Death and legacy ==
Cintula died on 22 March 1911 at the age of 63 in Prague. His death certificate states that his death was caused by stomach ulcers. He is buried at the Vinohrady Cemetery in Prague, in a tomb together with his wife, their daughters Anna (1895–1903) who died in her childhood from meningitis and Kamila (1881–1936) along with Kamila's husband Karel Reytt (1873–1945).

At the time of his life, Cintula was the sole Slovak professor of geography. A small alley at the border of Nové Mesto and Rača boroughs of Bratislava is named after Cintula. In 2024, after a poet named Juraj Cintula, unrelated to Víťazoslav Cintula, was identified as a culprit behind the attempted assassination of the prime minister of Slovakia, Robert Fico, there was a brief push to rename the street. Nonetheless, it failed to gain any traction.
