= Mikołaj Błociszewski =

Polish court knight and deputy (d.1419)

Ostoja

Mikołaj Błociszewski (Nicholas de Błociszewo) (d. 1419) - a court knight and the deputy of King Jogaila (Władysław Jagiełło) for negotiations with the Teutonic Knights. He was Castellan of Sanok (1401–1415), Judge of Poznań (1415–1419) and Lord of Greater Poland.

Błociszewski was born in one of his family's ancestral villages, which, among others, included Brodnica, today in the Kuyavian-Pomeranian Voivodeship, Błociszewo in Śrem County and Rąbiń in Kościan County, Greater Poland Voivodeship. Mikołaj was a son of Świętomir Błociszewski de Błociszewo of the Clan Ostoja. He married Dorota, a daughter of Dominik Jeżewski.

Together with his brother Jan, he originally owned estates of Błociszewo, Brodnica and Grabianowa. In 1408, he received permission from Wojciech Jastrzębiec, the bishop of Poznań, to build a church in Błociszewo, although the ownership of the estate of had been lately passed on to his elder brother Jan. Their sister was probably Formosa de Rąbin, who at the turn of the 15th century, sued for payment for her part of the inheritance. Mikołaj Błociszewski received nomination for Castellan of Sanok in 1401 and was in charge of the Sanok castellany until 1415, when he became Judge of Poznań and Lord of Greater Poland (Wielmoża Wielkopolski).

Błociszewski was delegated by the Polish King Jagiełło to negotiate a peace treaty with the Teutonic Knights, and with Emperor Sigismund von Luxemburg (Sigismund, Holy Roman Emperor), who mediated between the conflicted parties. On the Polish side Mikołaj Błociszewski was joined by Mikołaj Bydgoski, Castellan of Bydgoszcz and Hungarian baron, also of the Ostoja clan. On behalf of Emperor Sigismund, the negotiations where led by Stibor of Stiboricz of the Ostoja clan as well. The failure of negotiations led to the war with the Teutonic Knights, which culminated at the Battle of Grunwald (1410).

== Sources ==
- Kasper Niesiecki, Herbarz polski Kaspra Niesieckiego, part 2, page 307
- Translation from article in polish - title: Mikołaj Błociszewski
- Severyn Uruski, Rodzina. Herbarz szlachty polskiej, part 1, page 254
- Hungarian Aristocracy (Magyar Arisztokrácia) - http://ferenczygen.tripod.com/
- Polska Akademia Nauk, "Polski Slownik Biograficzny" (Polish Biographical Dictionary), Kraków from 1935 - Mikołaj Błociszewski
- Sroka, Stanislaw A. : Scibor ze Sciborzyc. Rys biograficzny. In: Polska i jej sasiedzi w póznym sredniowieczu. Kraków, Towarzystwo Naukowe "Societas Vistulana" 2000, p. 139-158

== See also ==
- Clan of Ostoja
- Ostoja coat of arms
- Stibor of Stiboricz
