= Dobrá Voda Castle =

Castle in Trnava Region

- Dobrá Voda, Slovakia
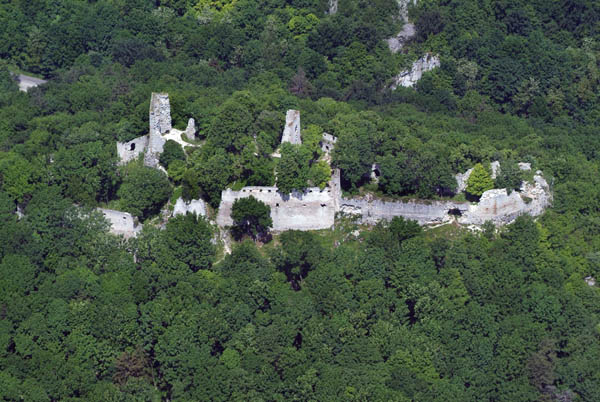
- Aerial view on the southern walls of the castle.

Site information
- Condition: Ruined

Location
- Location in Slovakia
- Coordinates: 48.609560°N 17.528759°E

Site history
- Built: between 1275 and 1300
- Built by: Comes Aba
- Materials: Limestone
- Demolished: 18th century

Dobrá Voda Castle (Hungarian: jókői vár, German: Burg Guttenstein) is a ruined castle in the municipality of Dobrá Voda in the Trnava region of Slovakia.

== History ==
The castle of Dobrá Voda was presumably built in the last third of the 13th century by Comes Aba from the Hlohovec branch of the Aba clan, when royal power declined in the Kingdom of Hungary. According to a legend though, the castle was constructed by the lover of a local girl who cured the king with water from the local spring. In 1316 Matthew III Csák occupied the Dobrá Voda Castle just like other castles in the region. In 1394 the castle was part of the royal donation to duke Stibor of Stiboricz. A group of unsatisfied magnates and prelates wanted to get rid of King Sigismund in 1403. As the castellan of the castle joined the rebellion, the royal army was forced to reconquer the castle.

After 1436 Dobrá Voda Castle became property of the Ország family. In the first third of the 16th century the lord of the castle, László Ország, died. His widow remarried with the head of the Nógrád, István Losonci who acquired the ownership rights of the castle through this marriage. In the autumn of 1567 the Ország family died out with the passing of László's son, Kristóf Ország. King Maximilian pawned the Dobrá Voda Castle to the Croat nobleman Ján Choron of Deveč. Another Croat nobleman, Krsto Ungnad, showed interest in obtaining the Dobrá Voda Castle. As the husband of István Losonci's daughter Anna, who inherited the filial rights after her father's death, he applied his option to the castle. In 1583 he bought the castle with all the corresponding properties for 70 guldens from King Rudolph. Through his daughter Anna Mária, married to the anti-Ottoman wars hero Tamás Erdődy, the castle became in the hands of the Erdődy family.

By the end of the 17th century, the Erdődy family already possessed and inhabited many manor houses in various towns. This caused the Dobrá Voda Castle to be abandoned. At the beginning of the 18th century, the war events during Rákóczi's War of Independence destroyed the castle. After being hit by lightning, the castle burned down in 1762. Only a prison for nobility remained in the castle for a certain time.

== Architecture ==
The upper castle consists of two prismatic towers with an oblong palace between them. Only the northern wall of the palace survived up to today. Next to the eastern tower is a small yard with a cistern with a well-preserved sink. A courtyard extends to the east of the upper castle. A presumably Gothic chapel sits at the eastern end of this courtyard. Another possible function of the structure is that it was part of the palace, which formed with its courtyard a fortified residence independent of the original castle. The upper castle was widened in the west with a forecastle. A cannon bastion further improved its defence. The entrance in front of the gate was fortified with a simple barbican. Because of the constant threat of Ottoman attacks an extensive lower castle with auxiliary buildings secured with cannon bastions was constructed. The access road to the upper castle ran through four gates connected by serpentines with straight stretches so that it could always be defended form a higher situated spot.
