= Ján Hollý =

Slovak poet and translator

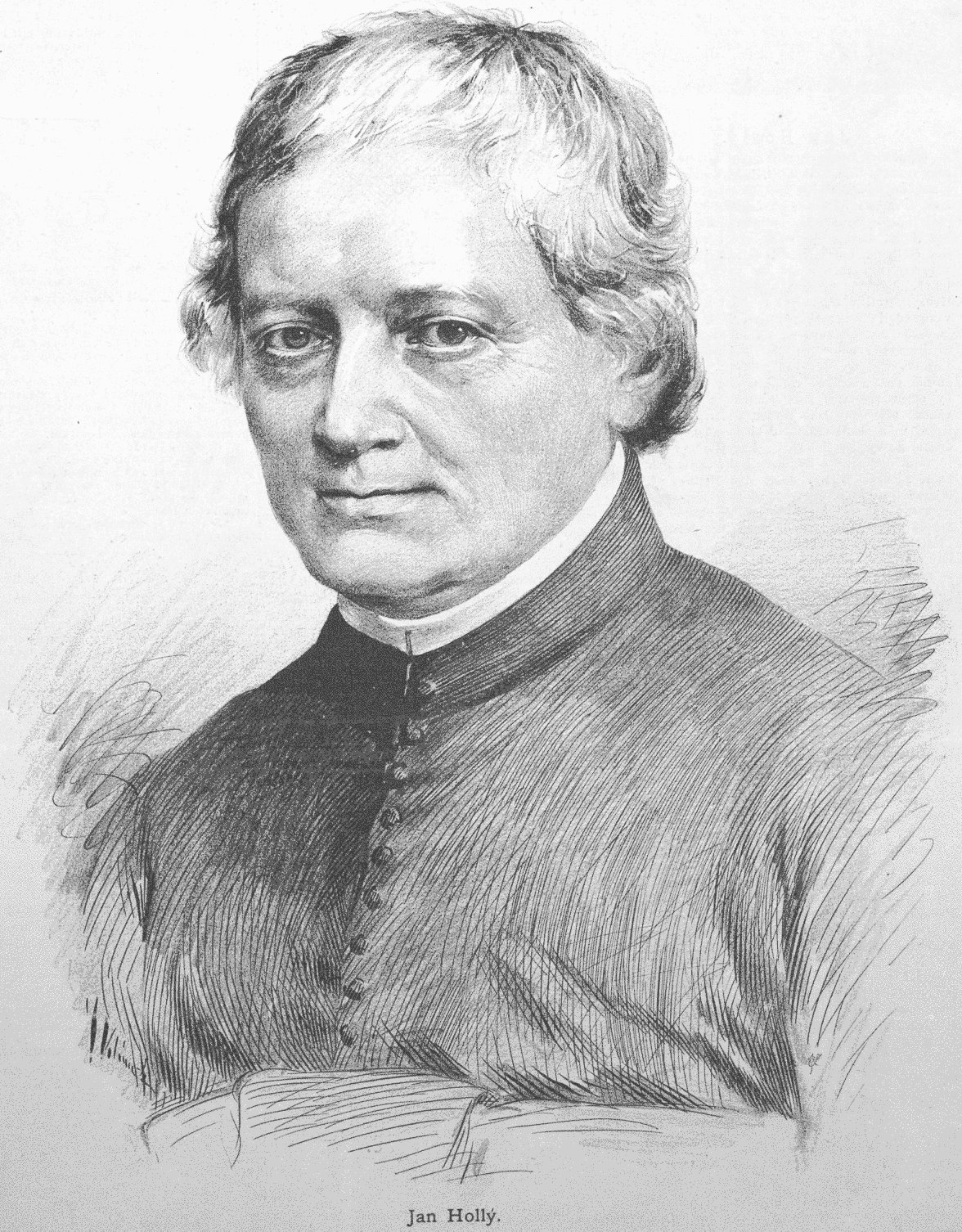
- Slovak poet and translator
- Born: 24 March 1785; Bur-Szent-Miklos, Kingdom of Hungary (now Borský Mikuláš, Slovakia)
- Died: 14 April 1849 (aged 64); Jókő, Hungary (now Dobrá Voda, Slovakia)
- Occupations: Poet and translator

Ján Hollý (contemporary orthography: Gán Hollí; 24 March 1785 – 14 April 1849) was a Slovak poet and translator. He was the first greater Slovak poet to write exclusively in the newly standardized literary Slovak language. His predecessors mostly wrote in various regional versions of Czech, Slovakized Czech or Latin. Hollý translated Virgil's Aeneid and wrote his own epic poetry in alexandrine verse to show that the Slovak language recently standardized by Anton Bernolák was capable of expressing complex poetic forms.

== Life ==
Hollý was born in Borský Mikuláš (Bur-Szent-Miklos). He studied in Skalica (Szakolca), Pressburg (Pozsony) and Trnava (Nagyszombat). He was a Catholic priest at Madunice (Madunicz) near Piešťany (Pöstyén), where he wrote all his major works sitting below a big tree. Hollý was an active member of the Slovak national revival movement. He used the topic of Great-Moravian ruler Svätopluk to encourage the nation, and is regarded as the founding father of Slovak poetry. Late in life, after a fire swept through Madunice, he moved to Dobrá Voda (Jókő), where he died in 1849.

== Major works ==
- Svatopluk
- Cyrilo-Metodiáda
- Sláv

== See also ==
- History of the Slovak language
