= Beckov Castle =

Castle ruins in Slovakia

- Beckov, Slovakia
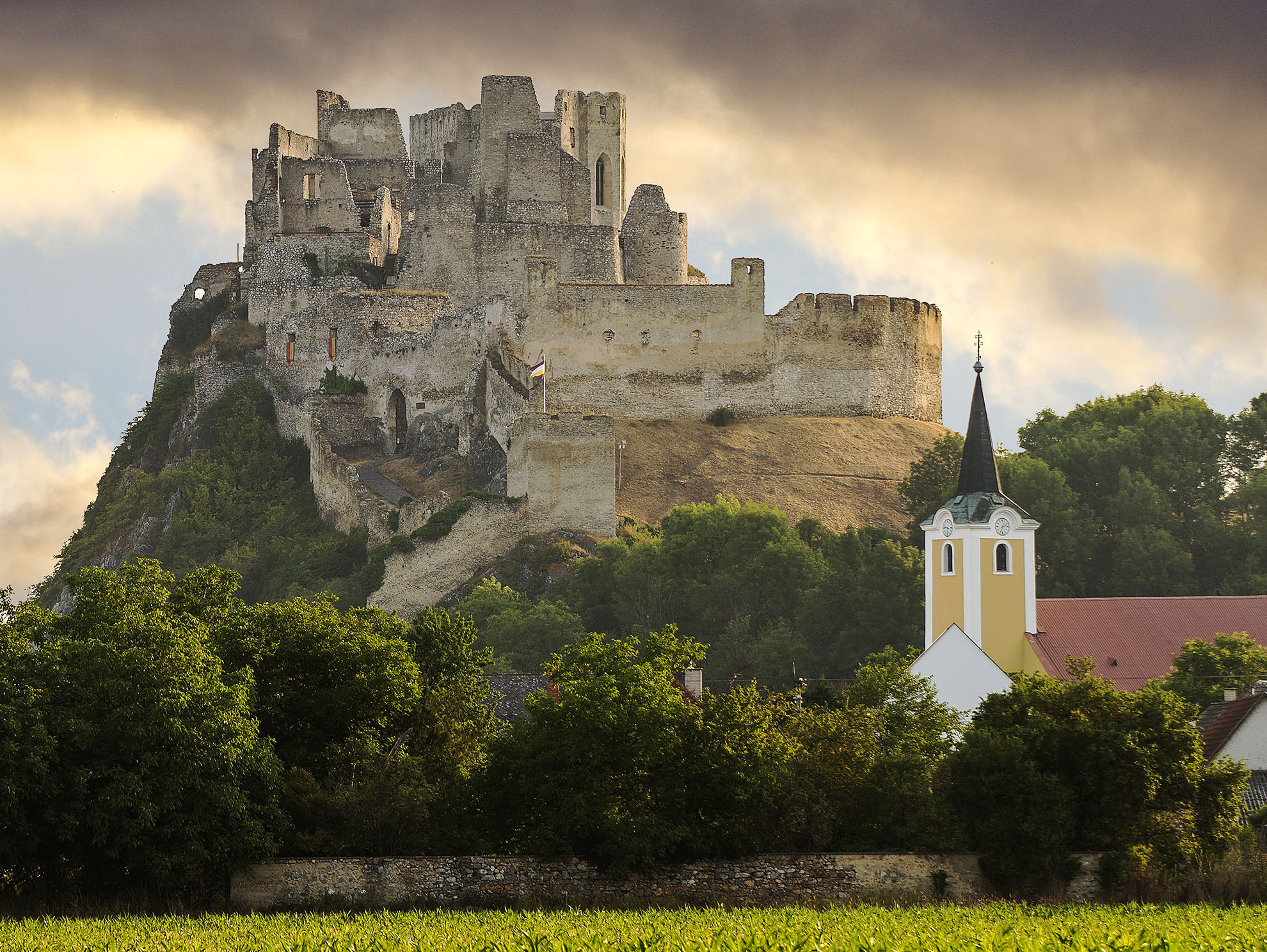
- Beckov Castle from the south

Site information
- Condition: Ruins

Location
- Location within Slovakia
- Coordinates: 48.7909°N 17.8981°E

Beckov Castle (Slovak: Beckovský hrad/Beckov; Hungarian: Beckói vár) is a castle in ruins located above the former town of Beckov in Nové Mesto nad Váhom District, Trenčín Region, western Slovakia.

It is a national cultural monument and its present appearance is the result of renovations in the last quarter of the twentieth century and since 2002.

== Name ==
The original name of the castle was Blundix (Latin version). The name was derived from Slavic "Bludište" reflecting the difficult terrain in the area (blúdiť - to wander, in the modern Slovak language bludište/bludisko - a maze). Later, the name of the neighbouring village Beckov was adopted also as the name of the castle.

== History ==
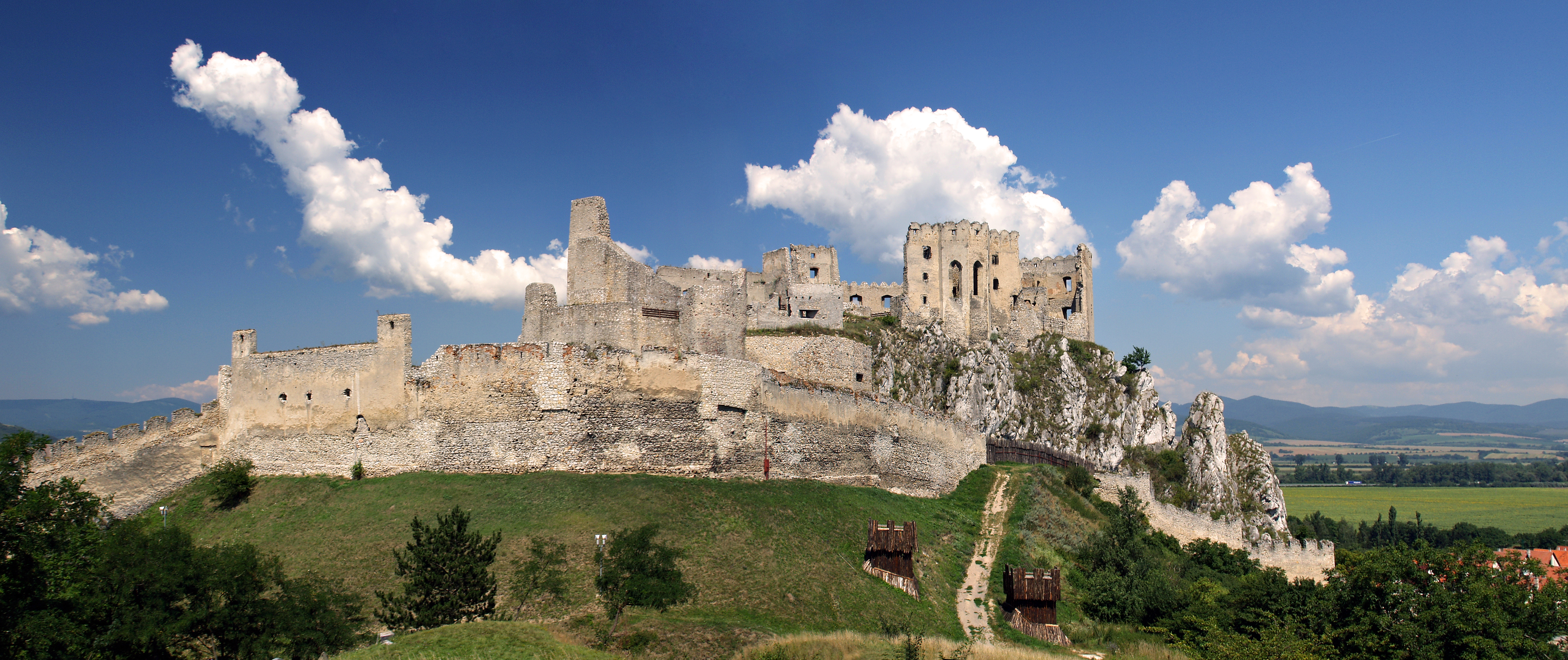
Beckov Castle panorama from the south

=== Great Moravia–1388 ===
The Beckov Cliff is a klippe of the Hronic nappe well exposed by the Váh River. The castle is situated on the cliff near the river, and was used as a strategic outpost in Great Moravia. A stone castle was built there to protect the borders of the Kingdom of Hungary, probably in the middle of the 13th century. The castle became property of Matthew III Csák at the turn of the 13th and 14th centuries and was fortified under his rule. After his death in 1321, the castle was administered by castellans. Louis I of Hungary gave the castle to Miklós Bánffy in 1379 as a reward for his service in battles in the Balkans and Italy.

=== 1388–1437 ===
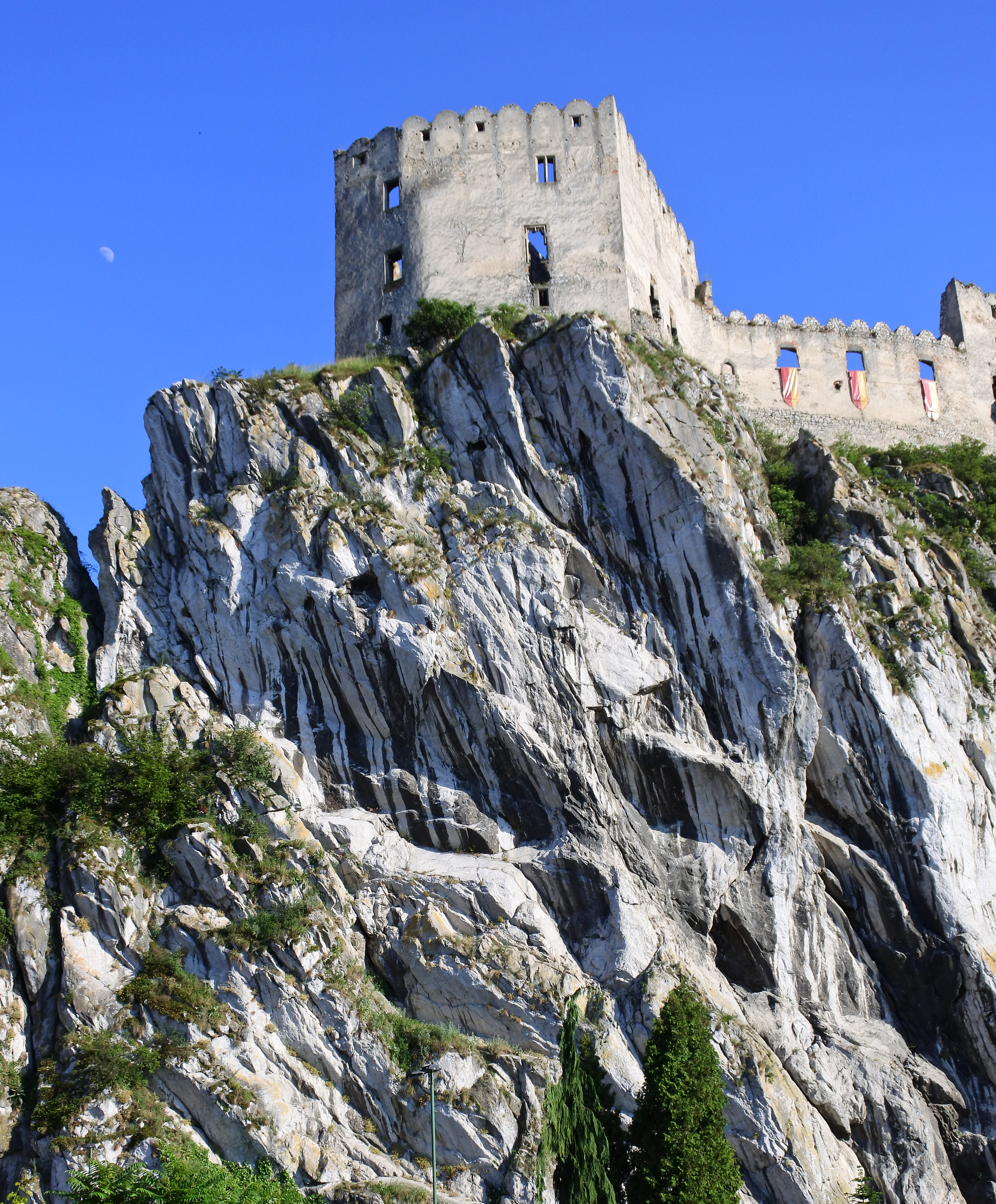
Castle from the southeast; limestone klippe below

In 1388, the castle was given by Sigismund, King of Hungary to Stibor of Stiboricz of the Clan of Ostoja, a Lord of Polish origin. Stibor was one of king's most influential advisors and in control of significant part of Northern Hungary (today, Slovakia). Of 31 Castles that was in possession of Stibor, he chose Beckov as his home, giving the Castle special care. He rebuilt the castle into his family seat in the Gothic style. Artists from Venetia, Poland, Germany and Bohemia were working on to make Beckov an outstanding place. Stibor also built a chapel with splendid sculpture decorations and paintings including sculpture of Black Madonna which was considered as one of the most beautiful in Europe at that time. In entrance to the chapel, there was a family coat of arms made of stone. Stibor also fortified the town below the castle and linked their walls together. After Stibor's death in 1414, the castle was inherited by his son, Stibor Stiboric of Beckov. Because Stibor Stiboric of Beckov did not have a son, he bequeathed the property to his daughter Katarína (Katherine). However, the royal council decided that she would receive only the customary one fourth of her father's property paid out in cash. The castle was given to Pál Bánffy by Sigismund in 1437, one day before Sigismund's death, probably under the condition that he would marry Katarína, which was fulfilled.

=== 1437–1729 ===
After the Battle of Mohács in 1526, where the Kingdom of Hungary was defeated by the Ottoman Empire, the Bánffy family rebuilt the castle into a Renaissance fortress and noble seat. One of the Bánffys, János Bánffy, was killed fighting against the Turks in 1595. The castle was successfully defended against a Tatar siege in 1599. The Bánffy family owned the castle until 1646, when its last member, Kristóf Bánffy, died.

Following the death of Kristóf Bánffy, Beckov castle was gradually turned into a prison and barracks. In 1729, a fire destroyed the interior and roofs of the castle and turned it into ruins.

=== 20th century ===
The castle was proclaimed a national cultural monument in 1970. Its present appearance is the result of renovation in the last quarter of the 20th century.

== Description ==
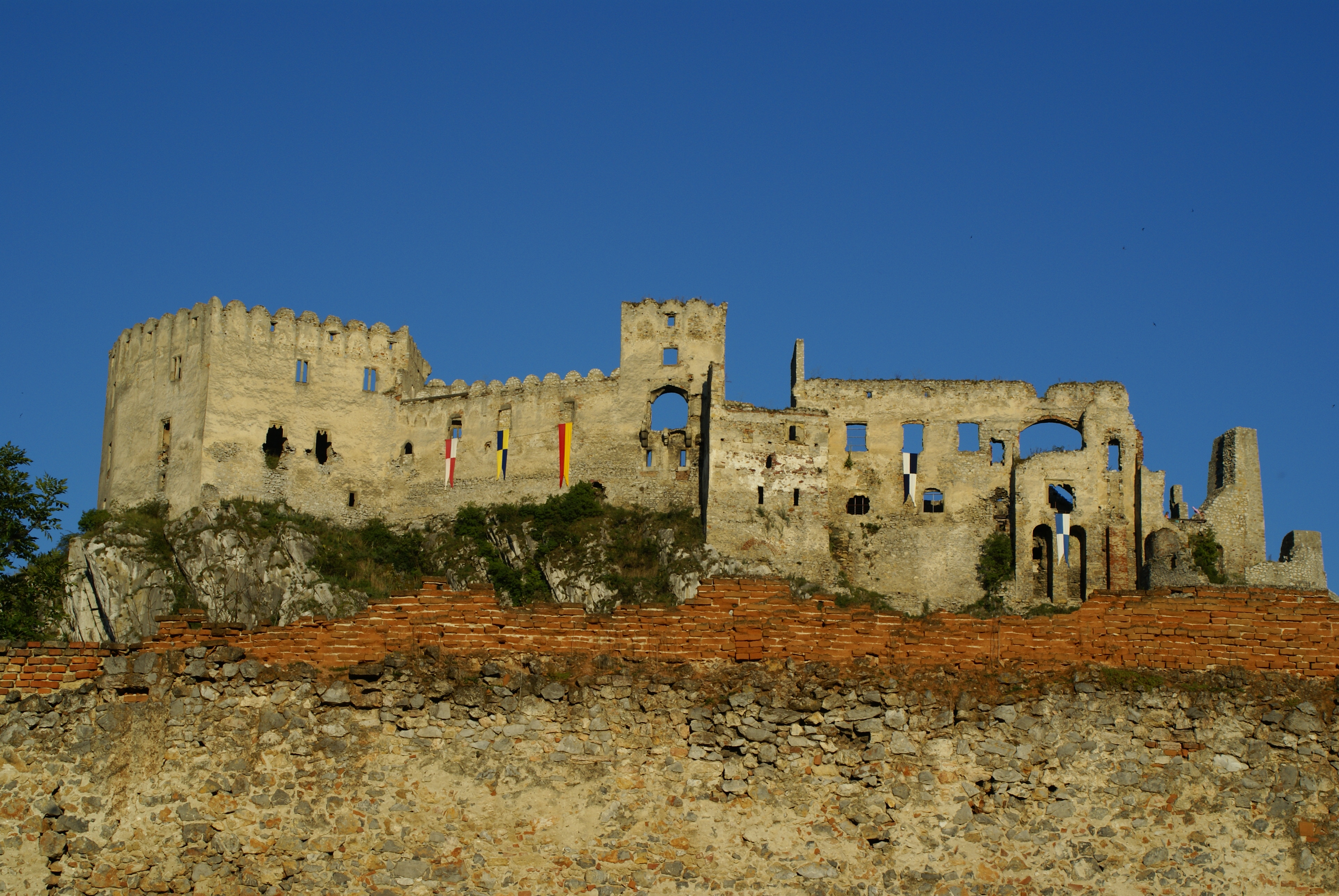
Beckov Castle, view from the village

The castle's 16th century entrance consisted of a drawbridge and moat protected by a barbican complex but have been replaced by a wooden bridge. Behind this main entrance a guard tower, built in the 14th century, protected the gateway to the ward. This building now houses the ticket shop of the castle. Attached to the walls of the guard tower are 14th century walls, built during the period in which the castle was in the hands of Stibor of Stiboricz. Thanks to the high stone walls and the steep cliffs on which the castle is built, Beckov castle is one of the few castles to withstand the attacks of the Tartar and Turkish troops.

Behind the first ward lies the lower courtyard of the castle, which is connected to the first ward with via a Gothic entrance gate with a pointed arch. During the Middle Ages craftsmen and servants had their houses on the lower courtyard, protected from possible attackers by a 14th-century fortification wall that runs all along the east side of the castle. Other buildings that were located on the lower courtyard are: a kitchen, an oven for bread, a smithy, stables and a storage for fodder and straw. Nowadays the lower courtyard houses an amphitheatre with stage and facilities for performers, museum exhibition, toilets for visitors and a souvenir shop. On the far-north side of the castle, the fortification wall also protected the well that was of vital importance to the inhabitants of the castle.

An important defensive function was also fulfilled by the Big Cannon Bastion, located above the lower courtyard. The huge semi-circular wall of the tower is attached to the castle rock and reaches up to the upper castle. The upper castle is the former seat of the castle lord on the top of the rock. It held the accommodation and reception rooms of the castle lord, while the servants' dwellings and farm buildings were located on the lower courtyard. The interior walls of the representational spaces were painted green (the noble color) and completed with rich painted decorations. Service spaces and farm buildings were white-lime and the defensive parts had a brick pink color. The upper castle formed a separate defensive unit and was protected from the lower courtyard by a gate with drawbridge. Several terraced spaces and fortifications at the southern side of the upper castle formed a defensive maze.

Inside the upper castle, behind the entrance, stands the renaissance Western Palace. During the Bánffy-reconstruction of the castle, this location served as a winter garden. Nowadays the building serves as the castle café. To the north, the Western defense bastion adjoins the Western Palace. The self-sufficiency of the upper castle was ensured by a service building and a water tank, located on the edge of the central courtyard, in a pit dug near the very top of the castle rock. The most luxurious building of the upper castle was the Cross Entry Palace, built during the Stibor period. From the service building and the Cross Entry Palace only ruins remain. Also located on the central courtyard was the Northern Palace. This building was built as part of the construction of the Gothic castle. This building does not only dominate the central courtyard but the castle as a whole. The three-storey palace is located on the most inaccessible part of the castle rock and contained the main reception hall called the Knights' Hall. It was lighted by Gothic windows protected by oiled parchments or cloth, wood shutters and during Sigismund and Stibor eras also by glass, which had long been the prerogative only for churches.

The real architectural jewel of the castle was the chapel which was built during the Stibor era and was connected with the living quarters of the Northern Palace. The chapel's portal that was topped with a stone tympanum with the coat of arms of the Stibor's family is now located in the Beckov museum which is located on the lower courtyard of the castle. From the original painted decorations only a few remnants remain. the Gothic sculpture of Madonna, known as the Beckov Madonna, is located in Koryčany in Moravia.

=== Jewish Cemetery ===
Adjacent to the castle approach road is an old Jewish cemetery with more than 100 tombstones. The oldest graves are marked 1739–1749. The first Jewish people came to Beckov at the end of the 17th century from Uherský Brod. In 1734 they acquired the land for the cemetery from Count János Esterházy. The road divides the cemetery into an "older" and "newer" section: the later being to the west of the road, directly next to the castle entrance. Most of the tombstones date to the first half of the 19th century. Inscription in Hebrew are more common than those in German. Since 1991, this cemetery is on the list of Slovak Cultural Monuments.

== Legend of Becko, the jester ==
Citation from Radio Slovakia International:

Becko is a Slovak Yorick. Everybody knows him and his wit is renowned. Thanks to his skills he’s achieved eternal fame with one of the most famous castle ruins bearing his name. Who was he? What is his story?

Beckov Castle is featured in an historically counterfactual legend suggests that the castle was built in the time of Stibor of Stiboricz of the Clan of Ostoja. Stibor was accompanied by his jester, Becko, on a hunting trip. As he entertained the men very well, Stibor offered him a deal. He could ask for anything he wanted. Becko asked his master to build a castle on the hill by the end of the year. Everybody who passed the hill had to help build the fortress for 8 days, and so Stibor managed to keep his promise. Becko became the master of this place for a year. As the castle was in a strategic position, Stibor asked Becko to leave it. Again, the jester was told to ask for anything he wanted. "Give me as much gold as I weigh." said Becko. He asked for yet one more thing, that the castle be named after him. At the farewell party, Becko took a bag full of gold coins and left to seek his happiness elsewhere.

Later, when the castle was completed, the noblemen had taken their dogs hunting. After returning to the castle and satisfying their appetite, the hunters threw the leftovers to the animals. A boy, a servant's son, had come to see his father, and because he was hungry, tried to steal a piece of meat from a dog, which became aggressive. The boy's father killed the dog while defending his child, whereupon Stibor became angry with the man and threw him from the top of the castle hill. As the servant was falling, he shouted out, "In a year and a day!" Stibor forgot about the curse. However, a year later, Stibor's son got married. Stibor got drunk and took a nap on a castle terrace. A snake suddenly appeared and bit Stibor in the eye. The wounded master jumped up in shock and ran to the end of the terrace. He fell to his death from the same spot as the servant had done.

The whole story was invented. For example, Stibor of Stiboricz entered into his service to Hungarian kings in the second half of the 14th century, when Beckov Castle had already been built. Similarly, linguistic analysis suggests that the name of the castle didn't originate in the name of the jester, which is an old Hungarian word meaning fool. Quoting the opinion of Slovak historians, the name Beckov is closely related with the word "bludinec", which once described a labyrinthine place. The labyrinth could have been formed when the river Vah flooded the area.

According to the legend, Stibor was very cruel and showed no mercy towards his servants. The stories about his cruelty have also been made up. On the contrary, according to historical sources, Duke Stibor seems to have been a very kind hearted and open minded person who founded hospitals and monasteries. He often pleaded on behalf of criminals and begged for their mercy.

How is it then possible that such a cruel legend was created? It seems people mixed up the characters of the nobleman and his son, who was, according to medieval documents, a really vicious person. The stories about Stibor's character and the foundation of the castle might not correspond to real events, however there are some elements in the legend that make one wonder how things looked in the courts of the Hungarian nobility.

The first element - feasts. It was important to impress the guests with the number and variety of dishes served, since this indicated the status of the host. The noblemen took great care in organizing feasts. A popular decoration on the festive table was a swan and many different kinds of meat. It is well known that many kings and noblemen suffered from gout, a typical royal disease. It was caused by the over consumption of meat. At that time, a lot of meat was eaten. Whether it was pork, venison, pheasant or beef, it was all eaten up. The etiquette of the time permitted eating with hands. Most of the time a piece of bread was dipped into gravy or it was used as a table mat under a piece of meat. When they finished eating, the greasy bread was thrown to the dogs. Do you remember the little boy who stole a piece of meat from a dog?

The second element - dogs. Dogs were mainly used for hunting since this was the main sport and entertainment of the noble men. It trained people to fight in battles. Boys and girls alike were trained in this way. Dogs were bred at the courts just for hunting. They were very valuable and were imported to medieval Hungary from abroad. These animals were an integrated part of castle social life.

The third element - alcohol. The brutal violent acts of the legend were caused by alcohol. The nobility mostly drank wine. However, wine drunk during feasts was not as strong as what we drink today as it was watered down. But it is a common fact that much alcohol was consumed. Even a century later when Beatrix of Aragon came to Upper Hungary she was shocked by the amount of alcohol consumption and by the horrible way in which the festivities were held. She had arrived from civilized Italy so she experienced a culture shock when she took part in the feasts at a Hungarian court for the first time.

Duke Stibor definitely had jesters at his court. However, we do not know whether one of them was named Becko. Nonetheless, despite being historically untrue, the legend depicts the founding of Beckov castle so vividly that almost everyone in Slovakia is familiar with it. "The Slovak Yorick is eternal, despite deviating from reality".

== Gallery ==
=== Photos of the castle ===
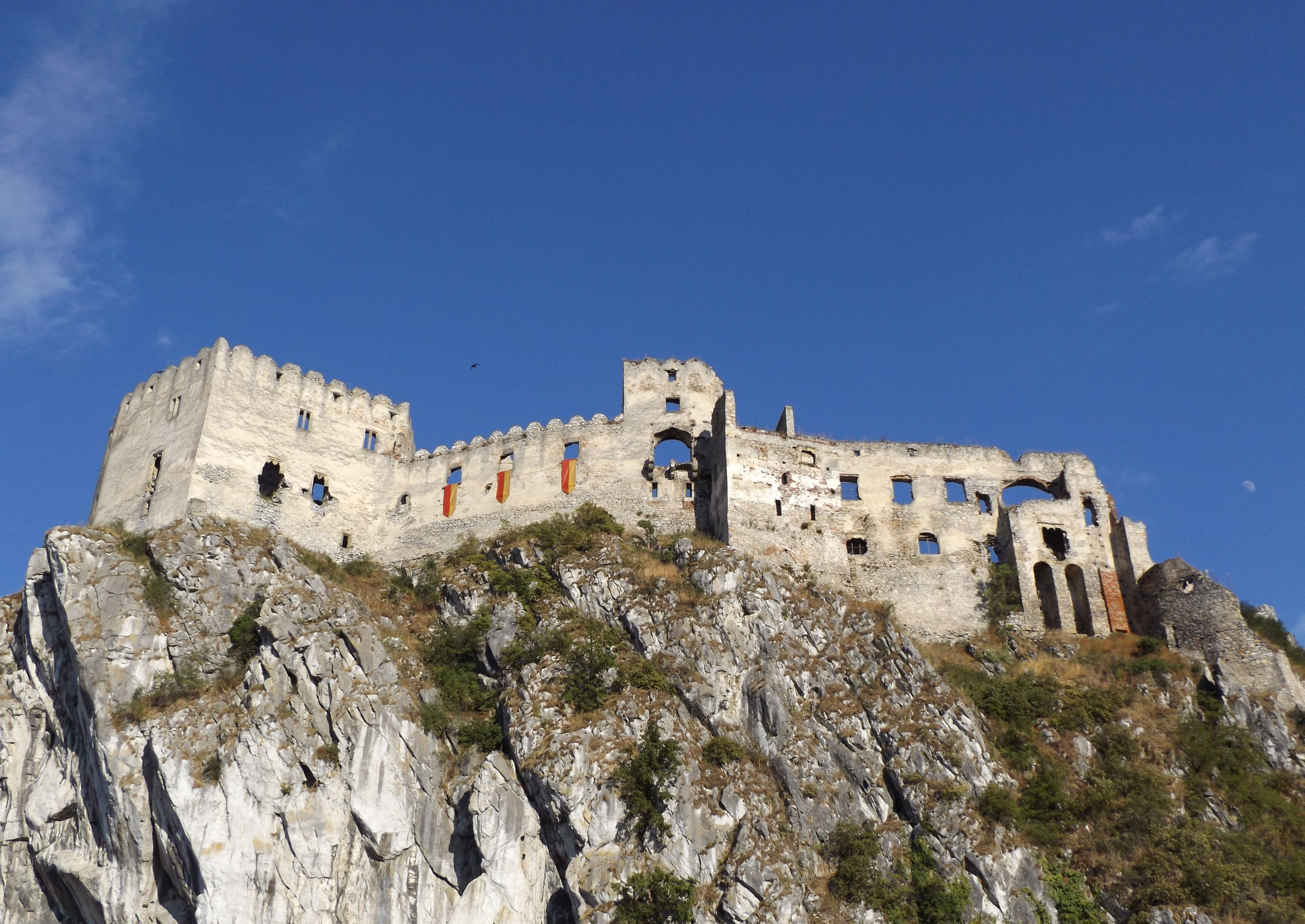
Beckov castle, on a cliff.

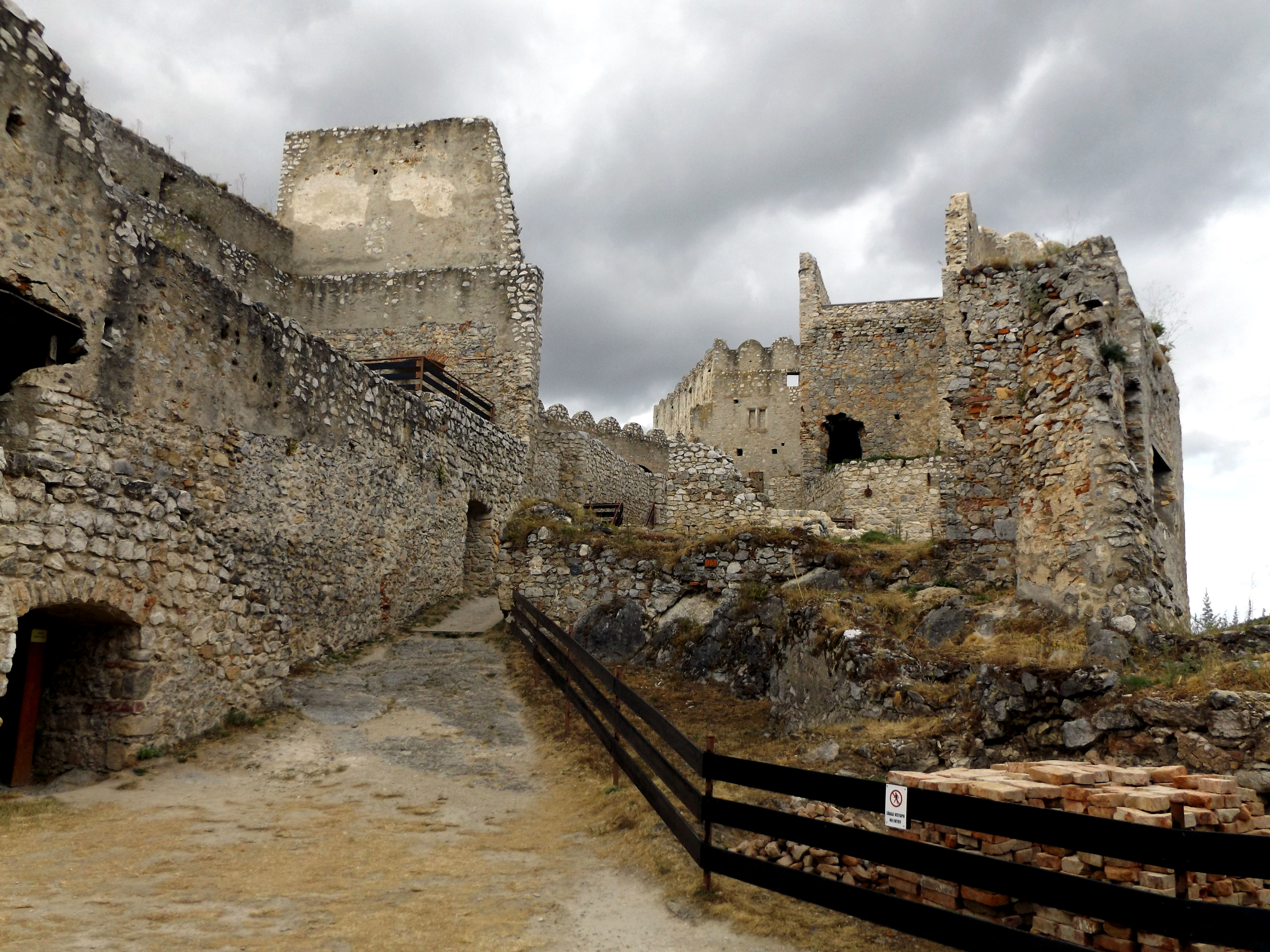
Beckov castle, road to upper courtyard.

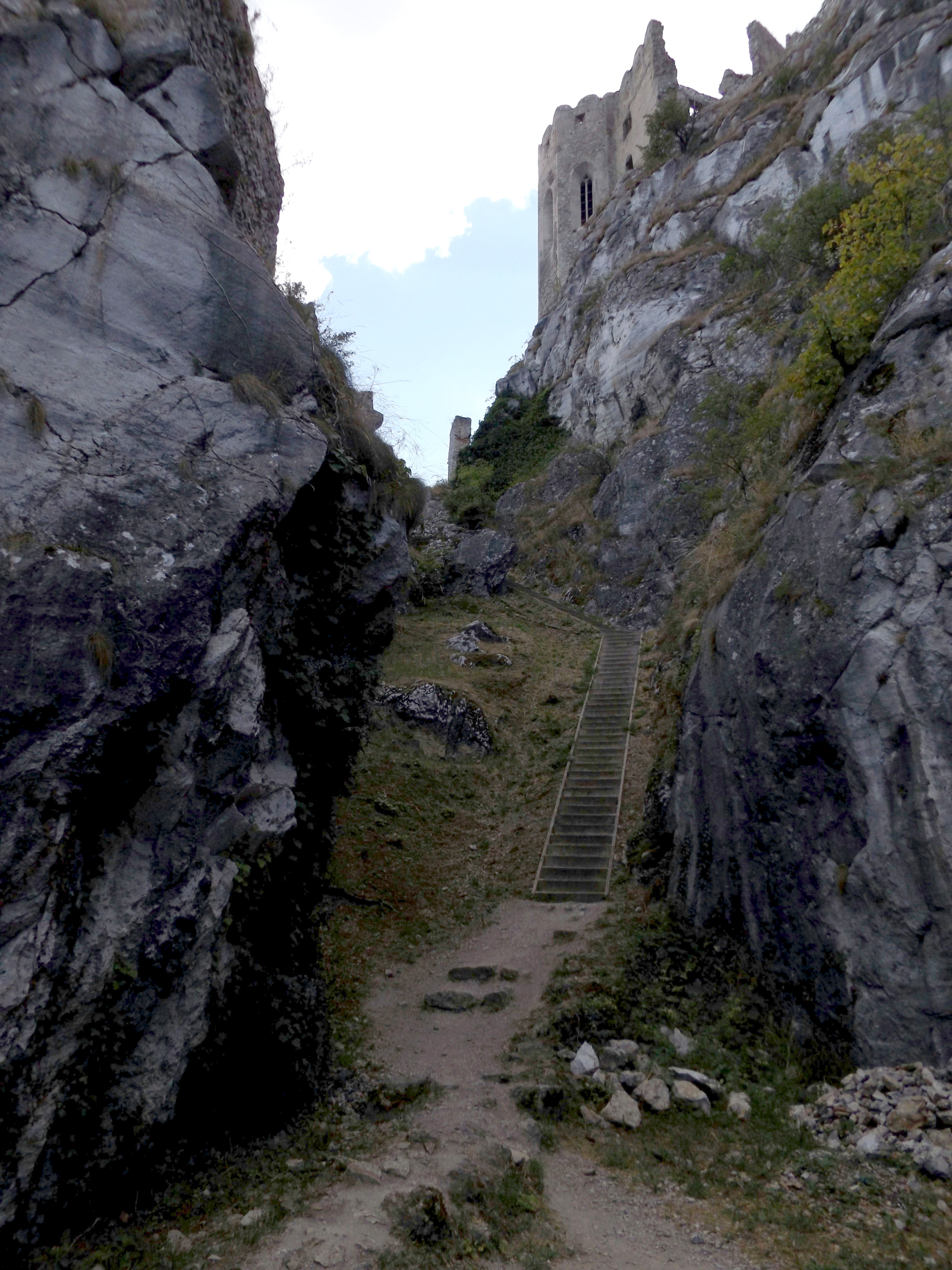
Beckov castle, view from castle's well.

=== Arts ===
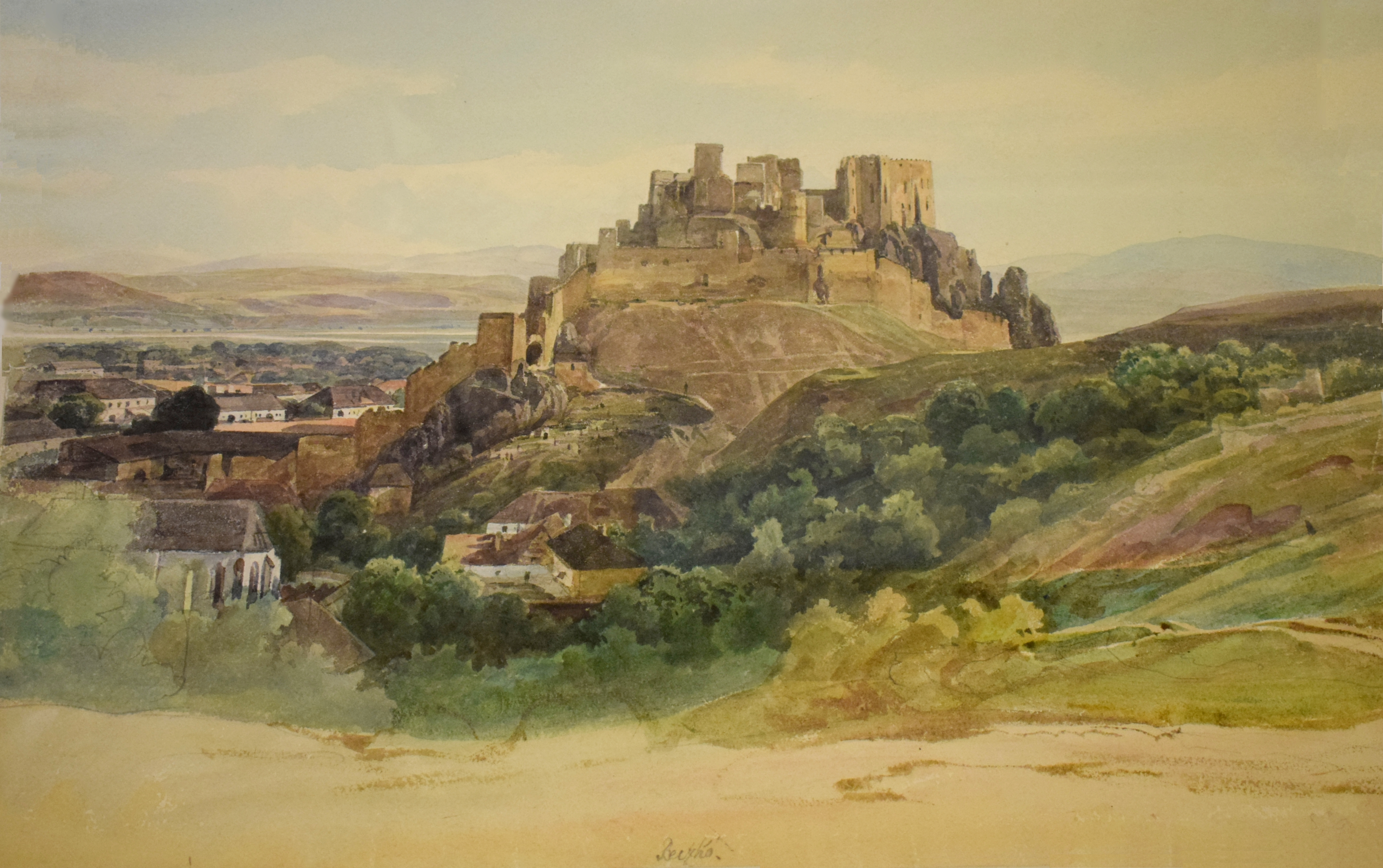
Betzko vom jüdischen Friedhof by Thomas Ender (ca. 1860-1861)

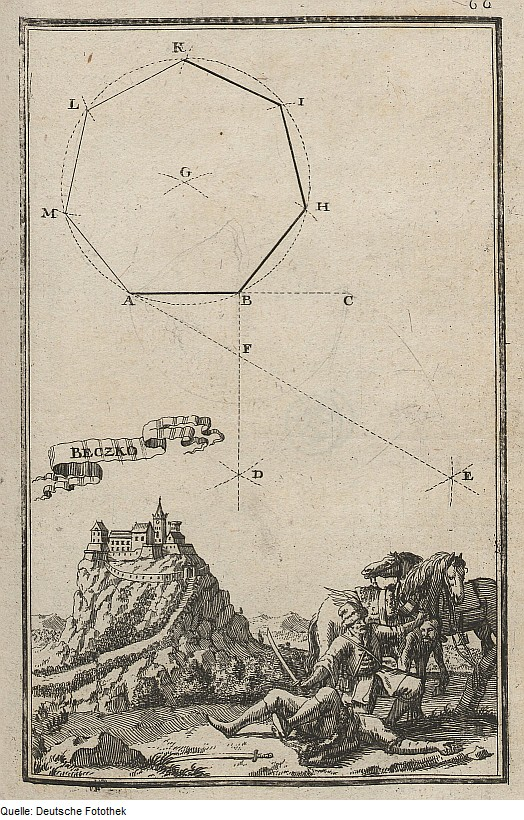
Siebeneck, Ansicht der ungarischen Stadt und Festung Beczko by Anton Ernst Burkhard von Birckenstein (1698)

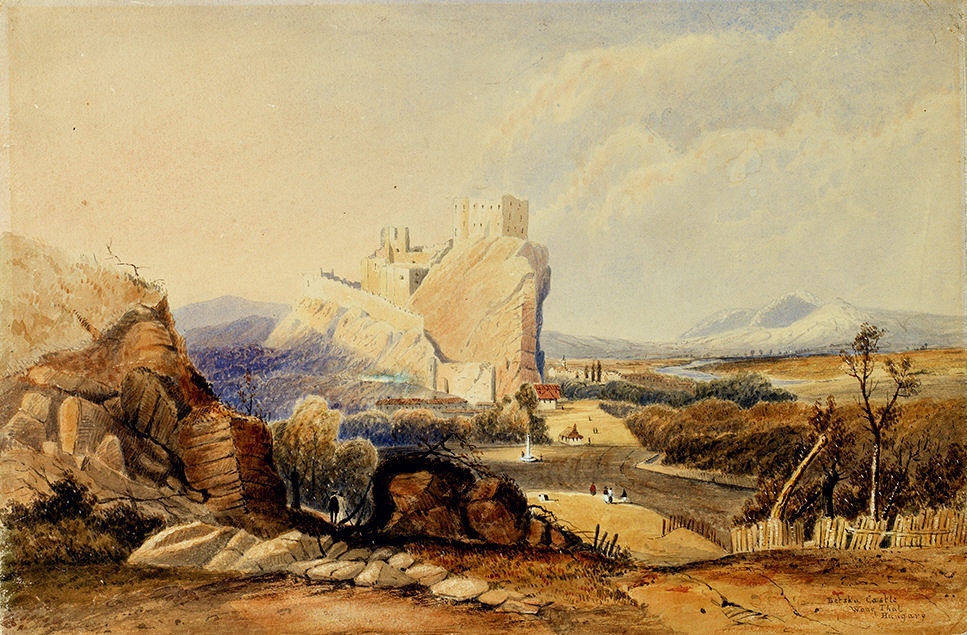
Betska Castle Waag Thal Hungary by George Edwards Hering (1879)

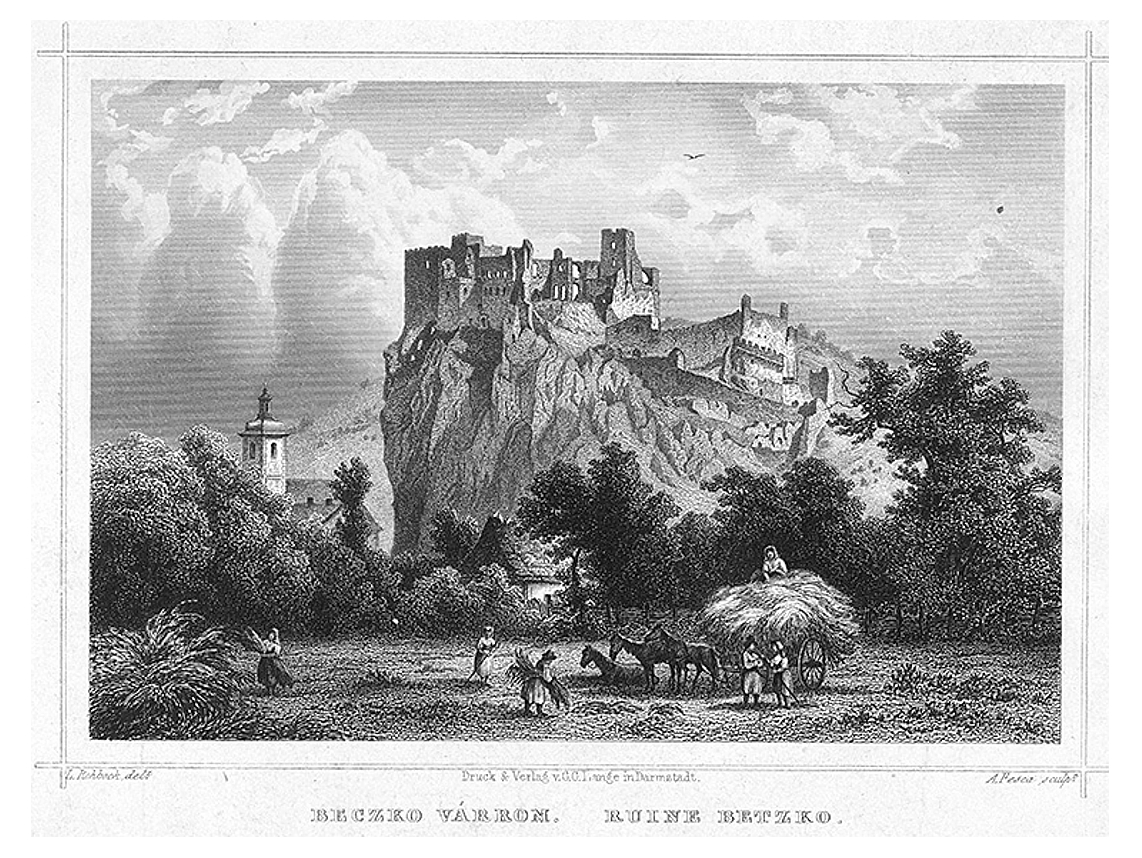
Ruine Betzko by Ludwig Rohbock (1863)

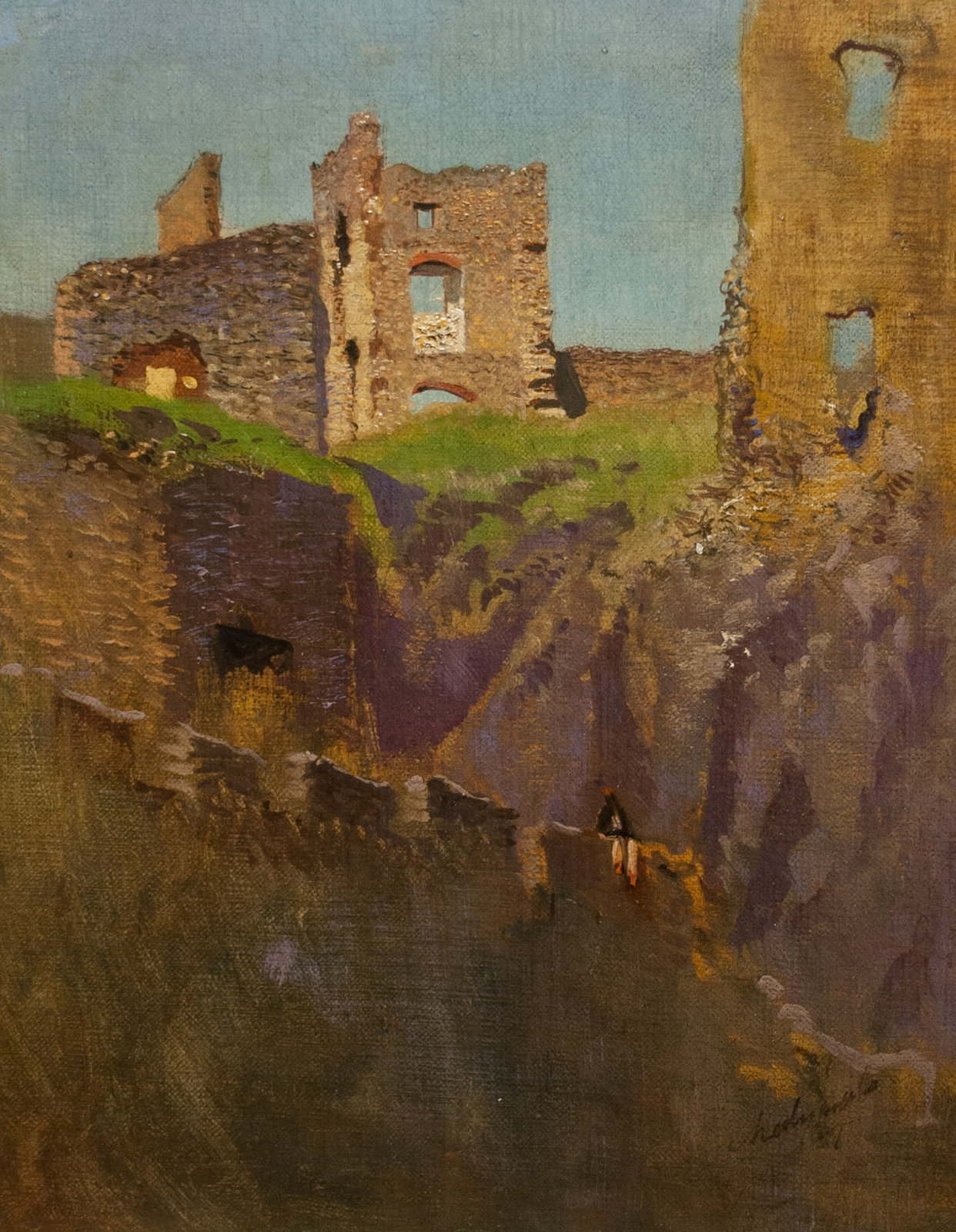
Beckó romjai by László Mednyánszky (between 1875 and 1895)

== See also ==
- List of castles in Slovakia
