= Friedrich Weinwurm =

Architect (1855–1942)

- Born: Alfred József Weinwurm; 30 August 1885; Borský Mikuláš, Austria-Hungary
- Died: 1942 (aged 56–57)
- Other names: Bedřich Weinwurm
- Occupation: Architect
- Years active: 1919–1938
- Notable work: Unitas, New Times

Friedrich Weinwurm (30 August 1885 – 1942) was an architect. He was the key figure of Slovak modernist architecture.

== Biography ==
Fridrich Weinwurm was born on 30 August 1885 in the village of Borský Mikuláš to a German speaking Jewish family. His father was, Nathan Weinwurm owned a brickworks, and his mother Josefine (née Grünhut) was a housewife. His birth name was formally recorded as Alfred József Weinwurm. Weinwurm was educated at the Lycee in Bratislava and the studied architecture at Technische Hochschule in Berlin and Dresden. In March 1916 he married Josefine "Fani" Wasservogel. After serving in the World War I, they settled in Bratislava and had two children – Juraj (born 1917) and Eva (born 1922).

=== Early career ===
In the early years of his career, Weinwurm worked as an independent architect in Bratislava. Due to his German education, his outlook differed from the majority of architect trained in Prague or Budapest. Weinwurm skillfully exploited the novelty of his ideas, coupled with his language skills – he was fluent in Slovak and Hungarian in addition to his native German – and connection within the Jewish community in Bratislava to become one of the most in-demand architects in the city. Although in his very first works, he briefly explored classicism, his designs quickly became notable for their clear purist style, without any concessions to then popular styles of eclecticism and functionalism. His most important work from this period was the Bratislava headquarters of a Portland cement manufacturer from Žilina, which he designed in cooperation with the Brno-based modernist architect Ernst Wiesner. Wiser introduced Weinwurm to Vienna-based architect Adolf Loos, who greatly influenced Weinwurm's architecture.

=== The Weinwurm-Vécsei studio ===
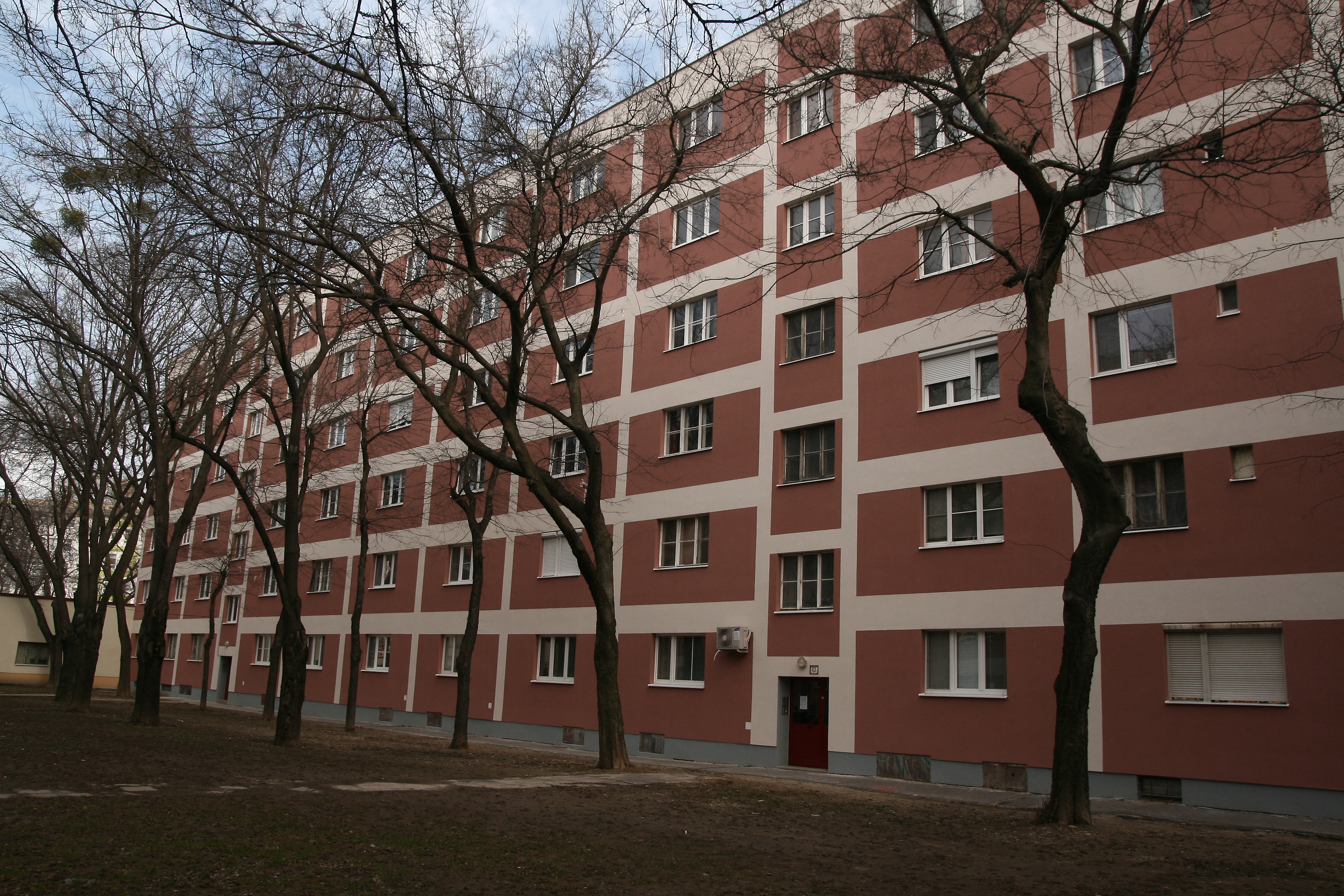
The UNITAS housing estate in Bratislava

In 1924, Weinwurm opened a studio with a fellow modernist Bratislava architect Ignác Vécsei. In this atelier, Weinwurm produced the bulk of his works. Initially focusing on smaller project, in 1927, the atelier was assigned the design of bank headquarters in Žilina, successfully leveraging Weinwurm's previous work for the cement company. Their design was very controversial as local authorities were reluctant to allow a modernist building in the heart of the historical city but the architect refused all compromises. While highly appreciated by architects, the public resented the building and it was eventually demolished in the early 1990s.

In 1927 the studio designed new headquarters for the West Slovakia electric power company, but its main focus turned to housing. Weinwurm and Vécsei designed housing for all income groups, including villas (Villa L and Villa T), rental housing (Life, Schön) and social housing (Unitas, New Times) as well as very high number of smaller projects. They also designed public projects, such as the public baths Grössling. In addition to architecture, Weinwurm was active in urban planning and intellectual circles in Slovakia. He organized exhibitions and discussions with Avant-garde artists, such as the Swiss architect Hannes Meyer in Bratislava as well as in Žilina and Košice.

=== Persecution and death ===
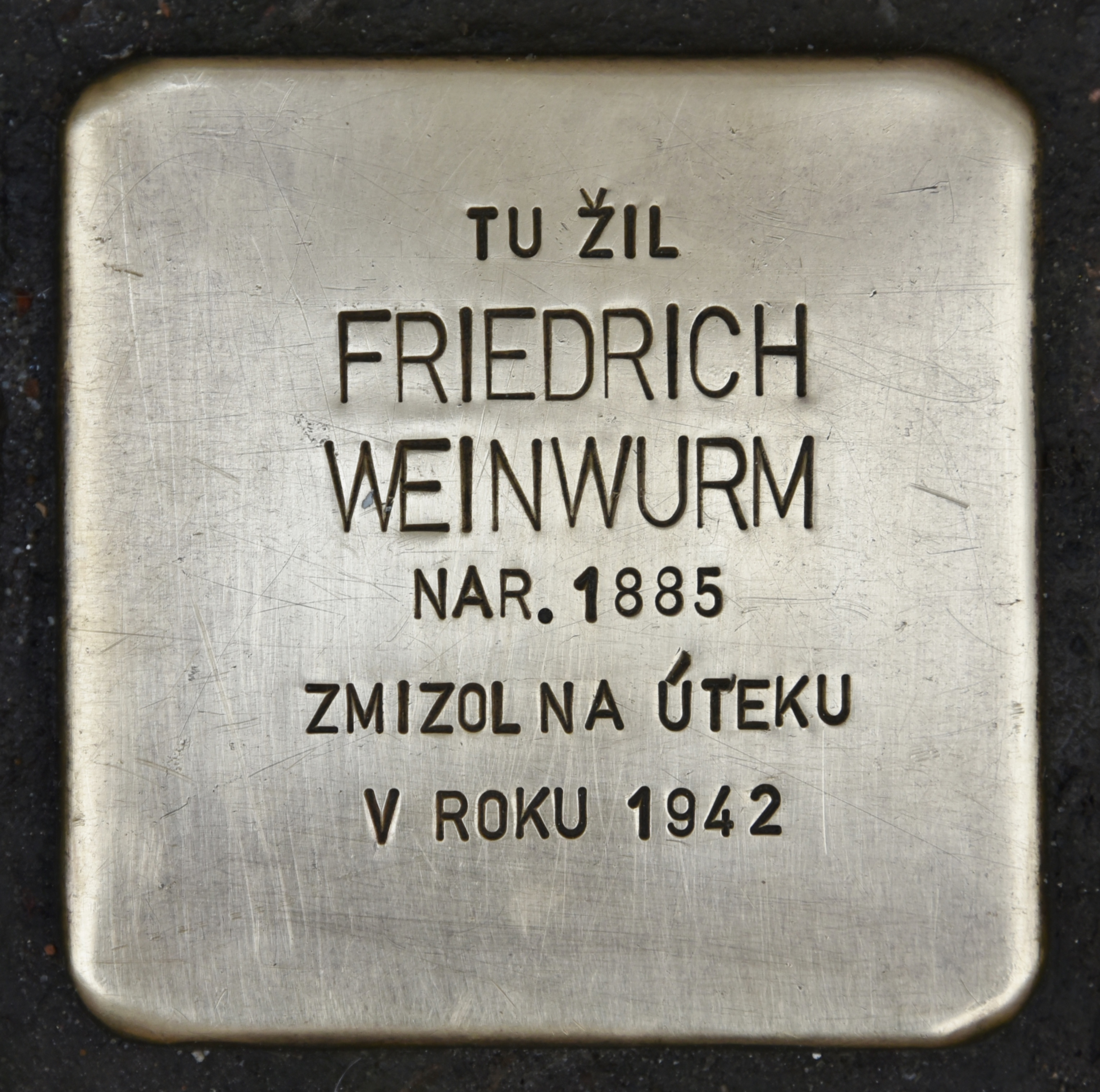
Stolperstein in Bratislava

After the fascist takeover of power in Slovakia, Weinwurm became targeted due to his Jewish background and lifelong left-wing convictions – he was close to the Communist Party of Czechoslovakia and publicly sympathized with Soviet Union. In 1938 the Weinwurm-Vécsei atelier was closed. Weinwurm was arrested in 1941 and briefly imprisoned in Ilava. In 1942 he perished. The circumstances of his death remain unclear. After being ordered to present himself for deportation to a concentration camp, Weinwurm gave what was left of possessions – mainly books, to the wife of communist politician Gustáv Husák and vanished. Unconfirmed testimonies attribute his death either to drowning in Danube trying to escape to Hungary or to being caught and executed in Ukraine, while attempting to make it to the Soviet Union.

== Work ==
- Nová doba Estate
- Housing complex Unitas
