= Borský Mikuláš =

- Municipality
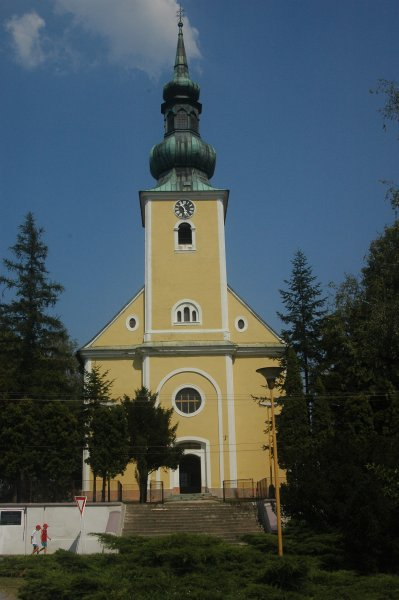

- Flag Coat of arms

- Location of Borský Mikuláš in the Trnava Region Location of Borský Mikuláš in Slovakia
- Coordinates: 48.63°N 17.20°E
- Country: Slovakia
- Region: Trnava Region
- District: Senica District
- First mentioned: 1394

Area
  - Total: 49.98 km^{2} (19.30 sq mi)
- Elevation: 197 m (646 ft)

Population (2025)
  - Total: 4,038
- Time zone: UTC+1 (CET)
  - Summer (DST): UTC+2 (CEST)
- Postal code: 908 77
- Area code: +421 34
- Vehicle registration plate (until 2022): SE
- Website: www.borskymikulas.sk

Borský Mikuláš (Slovak: [ˈbɔrskiː ˈmikulaːʂ]; German: Bur-Sankt-Niklas or Bursanktnikolaus; Hungarian: Búrszentmiklós) is a large village and municipality in Senica District in the Trnava Region of western Slovakia.

== History ==
In historical records the village was first mentioned in 1394.

The first mention of the village comes from the 14th century. In later times, the Hutterites immigrated here, who are reminded of the settlement called Habány.

But finds from the Roman era prove that people moved in the village's territory in the first centuries of our era. Thus, in the 14th century, Borský Mikuláš is mentioned as Zenthmiklos; r. 1773 the names Bur Swatý Mikuláš, Bur Sancti Nicolai, Bur Sancti Petri, Bur-Sankt-Nicklasz, Bur-Sankt-Peter, Bur-Szent-Miklós, Bur-Szent-Péter appear; r. In 1920, the village was called Burský Svätý Mikuláš, Burský Svätý Peter; from 1960 then Borský Mikuláš and Borský Peter.

The first written mention of the village comes from 1394, from the records of the newly established land administration, which supplemented the already functioning church administration.

The oldest mention of the village is in the form of Zenthmiklos and Zenthpeter is in the document of the Bratislava Chapter dated July 3, 1394. It is a statute for Stibor of Stiborice, which gives him the possession of the Ostriež (Sharp Stone) estate. According to this document and other documents, Borský Mikuláš belonged to Ostriež Castle as a vassal village. Later, the village belonged to the Holíč manor and its ruling Czobor family, who sold it to the Habsburgs.

The patron saint of the village is St. Nicholas, who in the 18th century also became the symbol of the village. The older symbol of the village was a running fox under a pine tree. The seal with this sign dates back to 1597 and this motif was also used for the current coat of arms of the village. The former village of Borský Peter had the emblem of St. Peter.

== Geography ==
The municipality lies at an altitude of 197 metres (646 ft) and covers an area of 49.98 km^{2} (19.30 sq mi) (2025). There are few watercourses in the territory of the village. The Myjava river and its tributaries Ságelský potok and Kalaštavský potok flow in its northern part.

In the southern part there are gentle hills (Lakšárske hills), the highest is Mária Magdaléna (297 m above sea level), others: Dubník (289 m above sea level, there is a 70 m high mast of a television transmitter on it), Ruženica (281 m above sea level), Vinohrádky (257 m above sea level) and Kravia hora (254 m above sea level). A considerable part of the territory is wooded, mainly with pine forest, especially in the cadastral territory of Borský Peter.

== Notable people ==
- Víťazoslav Cintula (1848–1911), geographer
- Ján Hollý (1785–1849), poet
- Pavol Jablonický (born 1961 in Senica, grew up in Borský Mikuláš), bodybuilder
- Mário Mihál (born 2001), footballer
- Fridrich Weinwurm (1885–1942), architect

== Population ==
Population statistic (10 years)
| Year | 1995 | 2005 | 2015 | 2025 |
|---|---|---|---|---|
| Count | 3846 | 3882 | 3959 | 4038 |
| Difference | | +0.93% | +1.98% | +1.99% |

Population statistic
| Year | 2024 | 2025 |
|---|---|---|
| Count | 4002 | 4038 |
| Difference | | +0.89% |

It has a population of 4038 people (31 December 2025).

=== Ethnicity ===
Census 2021 (1+ %)
| Ethnicity | Number | Fraction |
|---|---|---|
| Slovak | 3818 | 96.58% |
| Not found out | 111 | 2.8% |
| Total | 3953 | |

In year 2021 was 3953 people by ethnicity 3818 as Slovak, 111 as Not found out, 33 as Czech, 22 as Romani, 14 as Other, 7 as Hungarian, 5 as Russian, 3 as English, 2 as Ukrainian, 2 as Rusyn, 2 as German, 2 as Greek, 1 as Jewish, 1 as Vietnamese, 1 as Italian, 1 as Austrian and 1 as Moravian.

Note on population: The difference values of population numbers in the table "Population statistic" and in the sections "Ethnicity" & "Religion" is caused by the use of various statistical methods.

=== Religion ===
Census 2021 (1+ %)
| Religion | Number | Fraction |
|---|---|---|
| Roman Catholic Church | 3117 | 78.85% |
| None | 547 | 13.84% |
| Not found out | 130 | 3.29% |
| Evangelical Church | 68 | 1.72% |
| Total | 3953 | |

In year 2021 was 3953 people by religion 3117 from Roman Catholic Church, 547 from None, 130 from Not found out, 68 from Evangelical Church, 28 from Greek Catholic Church, 17 from Christian Congregations in Slovakia, 13 from Calvinist Church, 6 from Eastern Orthodox Church, 6 from Ad hoc movements, 5 from Other, 4 from Jehovah's Witnesses, 4 from Buddhism, 2 from Other and not ascertained christian church, 2 from Islam, 1 from Jewish community, 1 from Paganism and natural spirituality, 1 from Hinduism and 1 from Baptists Church.

== Genealogical resources ==
The records for genealogical research are available at the state archive "Statny Archiv in Bratislava, Slovakia"

- Roman Catholic church records (births/marriages/deaths): 1660-1898 (parish A)

== See also ==
- List of municipalities and towns in Slovakia
