= Dobrá Voda, Trnava District =

Dobrá Voda
- Municipality
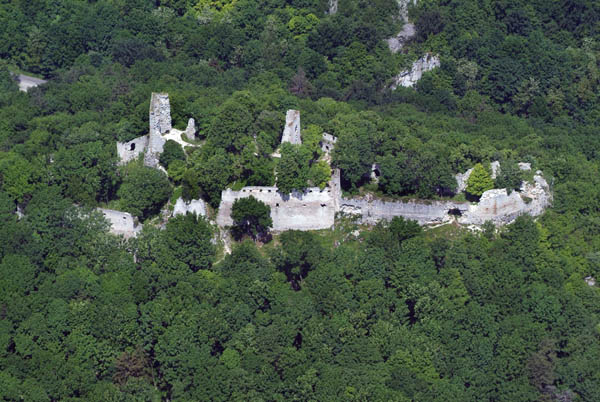
- Dobrá Voda castle above the village

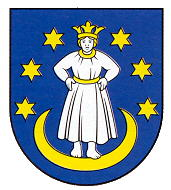
- Flag Coat of arms
- Etymology: "good water"
- Location of Dobrá Voda in the Trnava Region Location of Dobrá Voda in Slovakia
- Coordinates: 48°36′00″N 17°32′08″E
- Country: Slovakia
- Region: Trnava Region
- District: Trnava District
- First mentioned: 1392

Area
  - Total: 32.97 km^{2} (12.73 sq mi)
- Elevation: 244 m (801 ft)

Population (2025)
  - Total: 783
- Time zone: UTC+1 (CET)
  - Summer (DST): UTC+2 (CEST)
- Postal code: 919 54
- Area code: +421 33
- Vehicle registration plate (until 2022): TT
- Website: www.obecdobravoda.eu

Dobrá Voda is a municipality of Trnava District in the Trnava region of Slovakia.

== Population ==
Population statistic (10 years)
Year	1995	2005	2015	2025
Count	863	839	824	783
Difference		−2.78%	−1.78%	−4.97%

Population statistic
Year	2024	2025
Count	795	783
Difference		−1.50%

It has a population of 783 people (31 December 2025).

=== Ethnicity ===
Census 2021 (1+%)
Ethnicity	Number	Fraction
Slovak	777	96.76%
Not found out	18	2.24%
Total	803	

In year 2021 was 803 people by ethnicity 777 as Slovak, 18 as Not found out, 5 as Czech, 4 as Russian, 2 as Ukrainian, 1 as Italian, 1 as Rusyn, 1 as Austrian, 1 as German and 1 as Hungarian.

Note on population: The difference values of population numbers in the table "Population statistic" and in the sections "Ethnicity" & "Religion" is caused by the use of various statistical methods.

=== Religion ===
Census 2021 (1+%)
Religion	Number	Fraction
Roman Catholic Church	629	78.33%
None	132	16.44%
Not found out	18	2.24%
Evangelical Church	11	1.37%
Total	803	

In year 2021 was 803 people by religion 629 from Roman Catholic Church, 132 from None, 18 from Not found out, 11 from Evangelical Church, 4 from Greek Catholic Church, 2 from Other, 2 from Ad hoc movements, 1 from Eastern Orthodox Church, 1 from Paganism and natural spirituality, 1 from Christian Congregations in Slovakia, 1 from Islam and 1 from Buddhism.

== Cultural sites ==
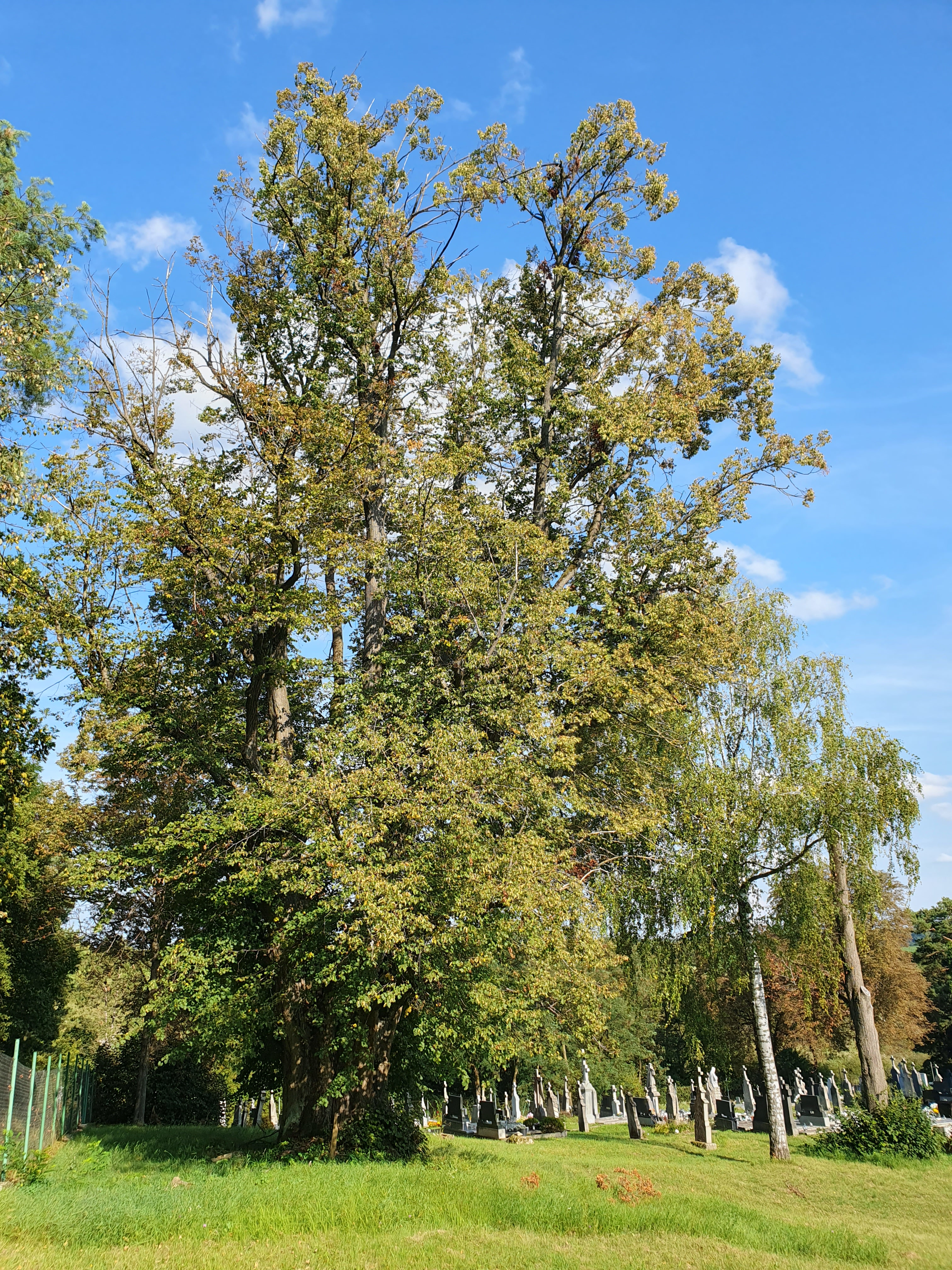
The linden tree next to the village cemetery.

A Roman Catholic church from 1820 and a Holy Trinity chapel from 1730 are located in the village.

The ruins of the Dobrá Voda castle are located in the Little Carpathians in Dobrá Voda.

A small-leaved linden tree located by the cemetery has been protected since 2 March 2000 under the Generally Binding Decree of the Trnava Regional Administrative Court 1/2000 for its cultural, historical, landscape-forming and aesthetic significance. The age of the tree is estimated to be at least 150 years.

== Notable people ==
The most important poet of the Bernolák's group, Ján Hollý, lived and worked during the last years of his life (1843–1849) in Dobrá Voda.

Holly is buried under the Dobrá Voda linden tree.

== Earthquakes ==
The village of Dobrá Voda was the seismologically most active region of Slovakia in the 20th century. In 1906 this resulted in the heaviest earthquake of that century in Slovakia happening in this region.

== See also ==
- List of municipalities and towns in Slovakia
