= Sromowce =

Sromowce may refer to the adjacent villages of:

- Sromowce Wyżne, Gmina Czorsztyn, Lesser Poland Voivodeship, southern Poland
- Sromowce Niżne, Gmina Czorsztyn, Lesser Poland Voivodeship, southern Poland
