= Dračí hrádok =

Castle ruins in Slovakia

- Borinka in Slovakia
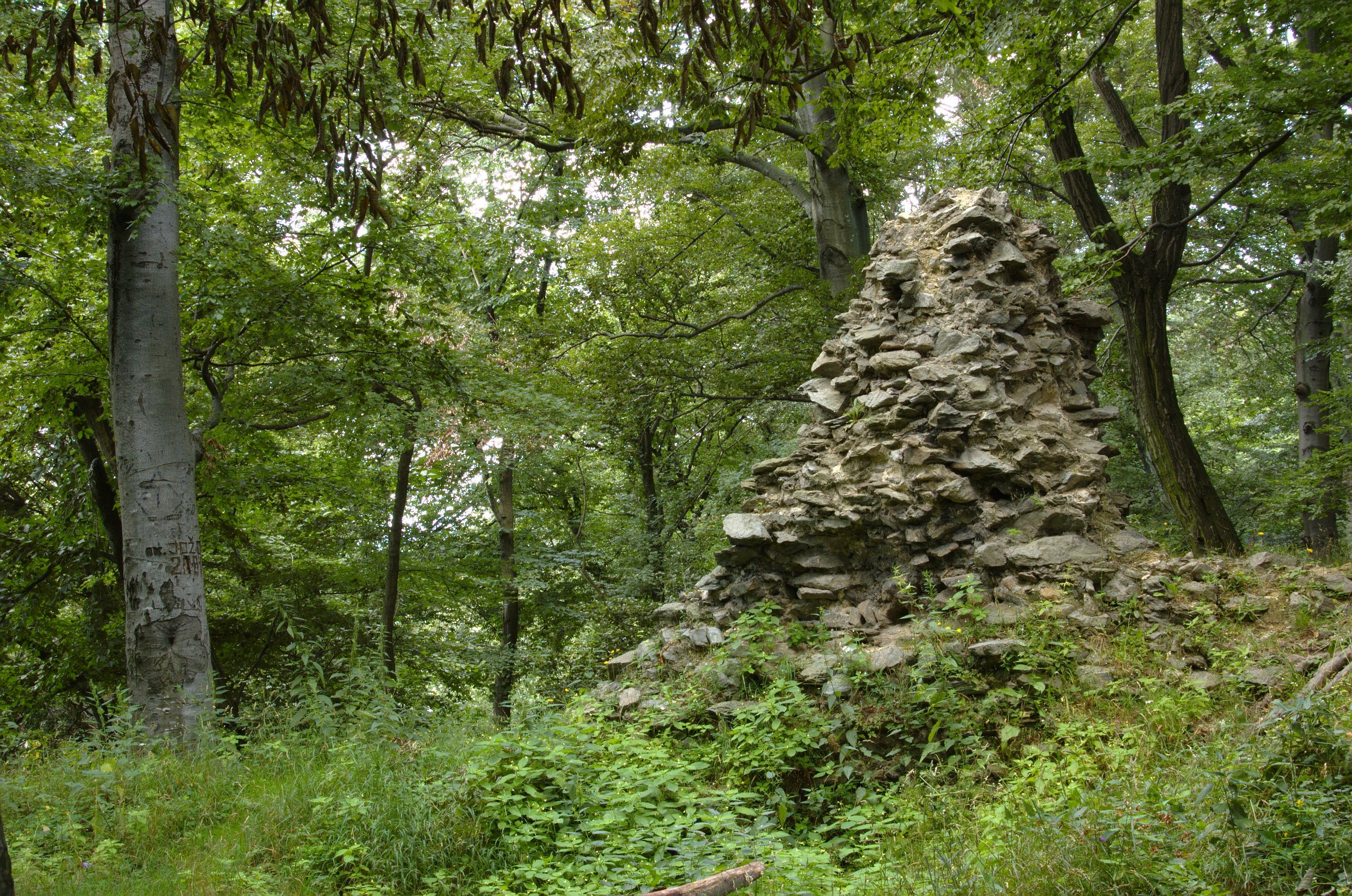
- Remains of a tower at Dračí hrádok

Site information
- Type: Castle ruins
- Open to the public: Yes
- Condition: Ruined

Location
- Dračí hrádok (Slovakia)
- Location in Slovakia
- Coordinates: 48.255°N 17.1113°E

Site history
- Built: 13th century

Dračí hrádok (literally Dragon fort or Dragon castle in English) are the ruins of a castle located in the southernmost part of the Little Carpathians, less than 2 km southeast of Borinka in the Bratislava region, Slovakia.

The castle was built in the 13th century on a hill above the valley of the Stupava stream at an altitude of about 370 m above sea level.

Along with other castle ruins in the region, such as Biely Kameň and Pajštún Castle, Dračí hrádok is a hiking destination near the country's capital, Bratislava.

== History ==
In the absence of explicit written mentions, the history of the castle is subject to some dispute. The first archaeological excavation conducted on the site by Professor Vojtech Ondrouch in 1940–1941 raised the possibility that the Dračí hrádok was built on top of an older Roman burgus Later research concluded this was not the case.

Despite evidence of occasional human activity dating back as far as 4000 BC, Dračí hrádok was built in the second half of the 13th century. It was destroyed not long after its creation following an attack as part of which most of the wooden structures burned down. The fire also undermined the integrity of the stone walls and tower which were subsequently left to decay. It is possible the castle was destroyed before 1273, because it is not mentioned in records describing the conquest of western Kingdom of Hungary by Ottokar II of Bohemia or later conquests by Albrecht of Habsburg. Other sources date the destruction of the castle to 1430–1460. However, the vast majority of objects found by archaeological digs on the site date to the second half of the 13th century. Latest archaeological research therefore also rejects the theory that Dračí hrádok could be depicted in a 16th-century engraving of the coronation of Maximilian II, Holy Roman Emperor in Bratislava.

== Description ==
The core of the castle is about 20 m wide and over 100 m long. It is not clear how the whole area was used. Only a part of the tower at the front of the fortification has been preserved to this day. The tower was built on a square foundation approximately 10 × 10 m in size. The tower remains are about 2 m tall. The tower was built behind a 17 m wide and 6 m deep moat dug into the rock.

== Gallery ==
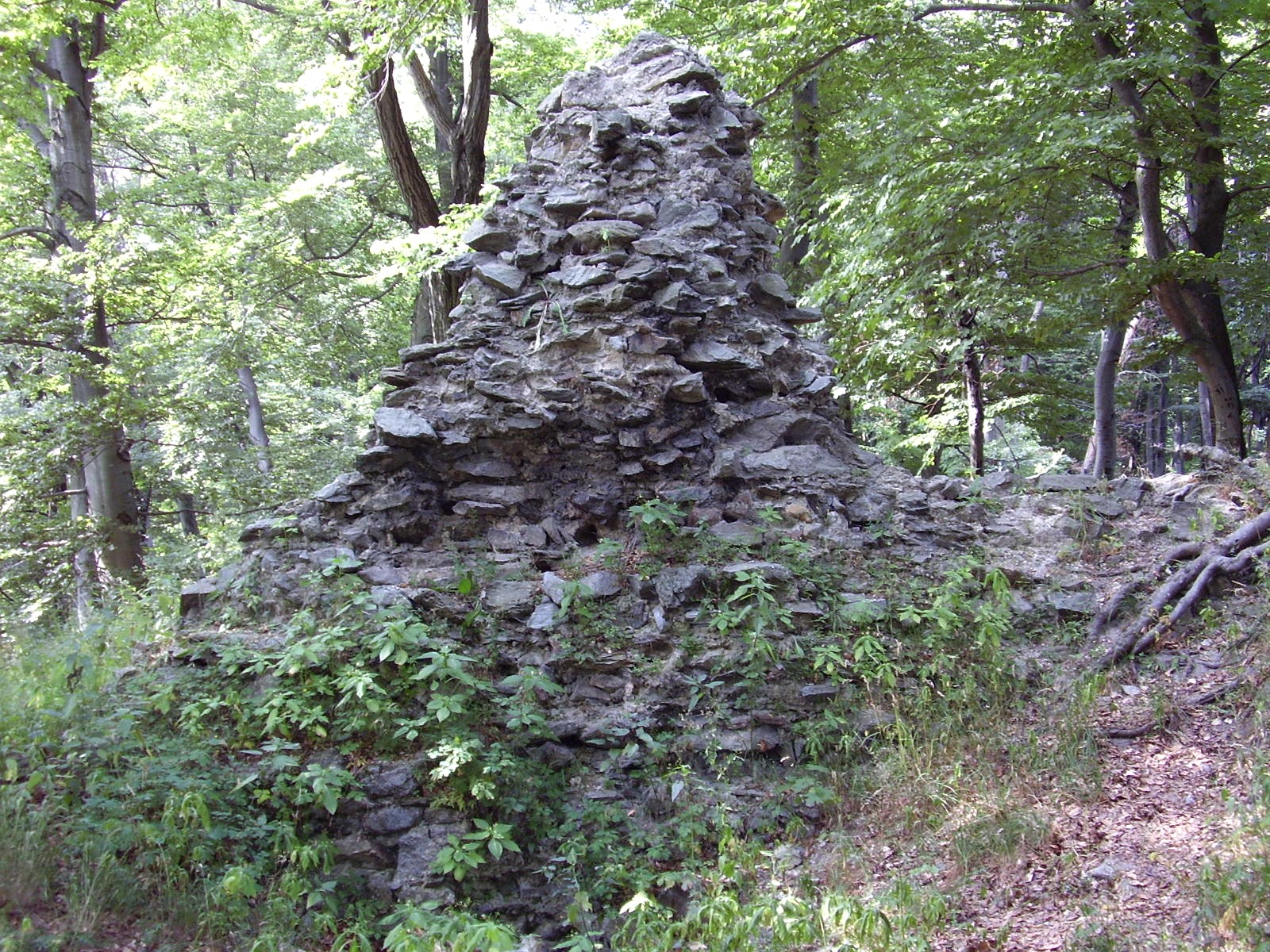
The best preserved part - the former main tower

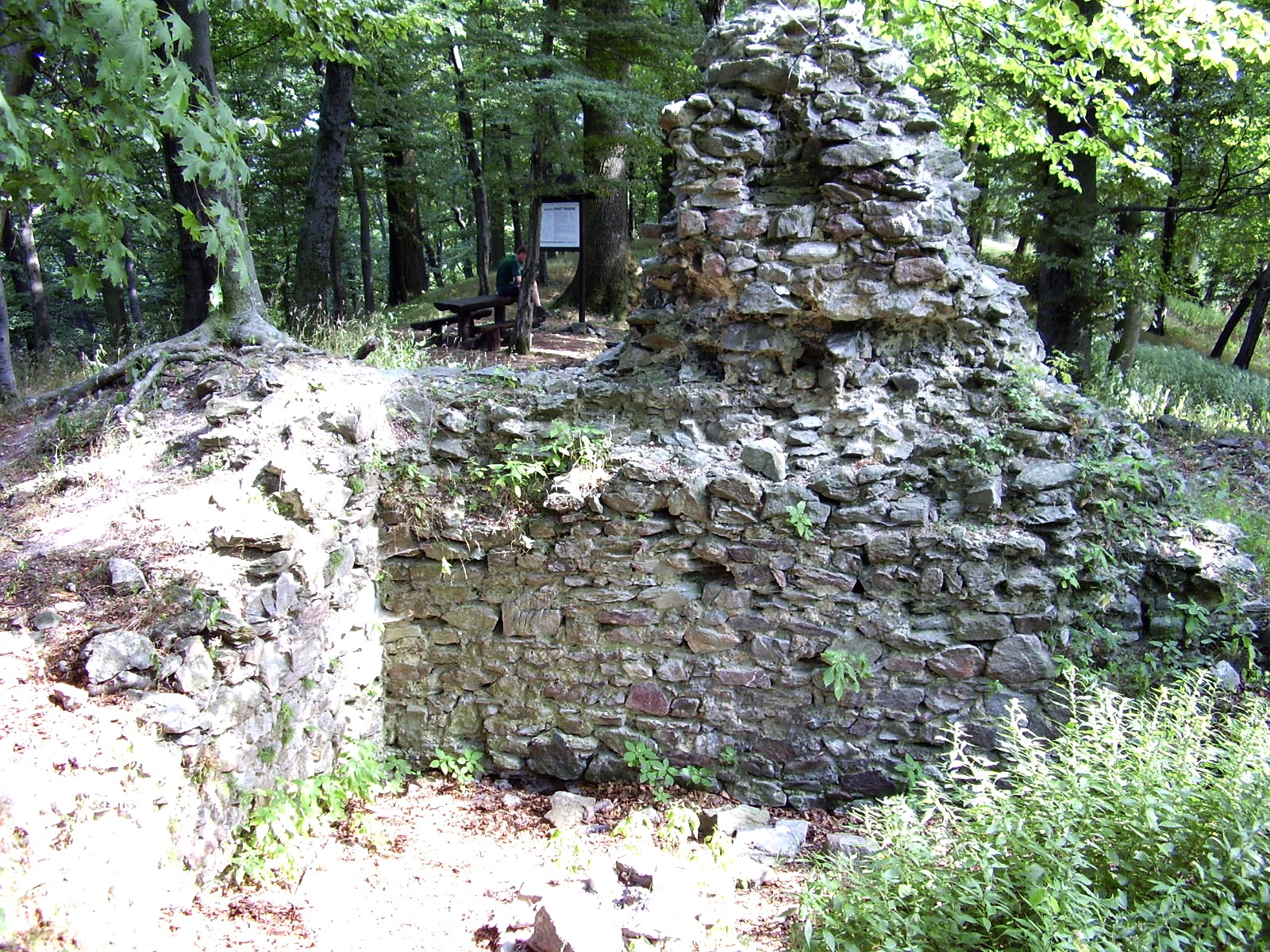
Former main tower - view from the other side

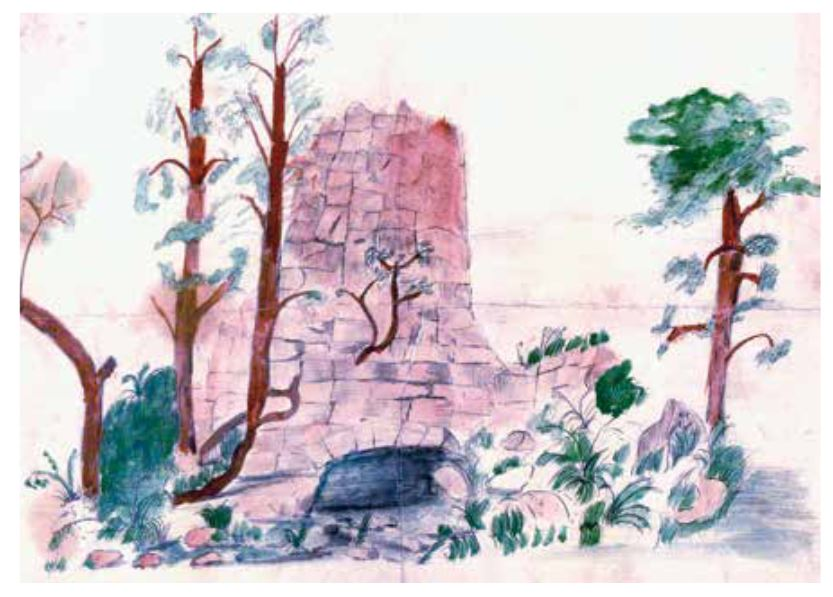
Dračí hrádok on a colored drawing by Teodor Weisz from 1871

== See also ==
- Pajštún Castle
- Čeklís Castle
- Biely Kameň
- Kuchyňa Castle
- List of castles in Slovakia
