= Kuchyňa Castle =

- Kuchyňa in Slovakia
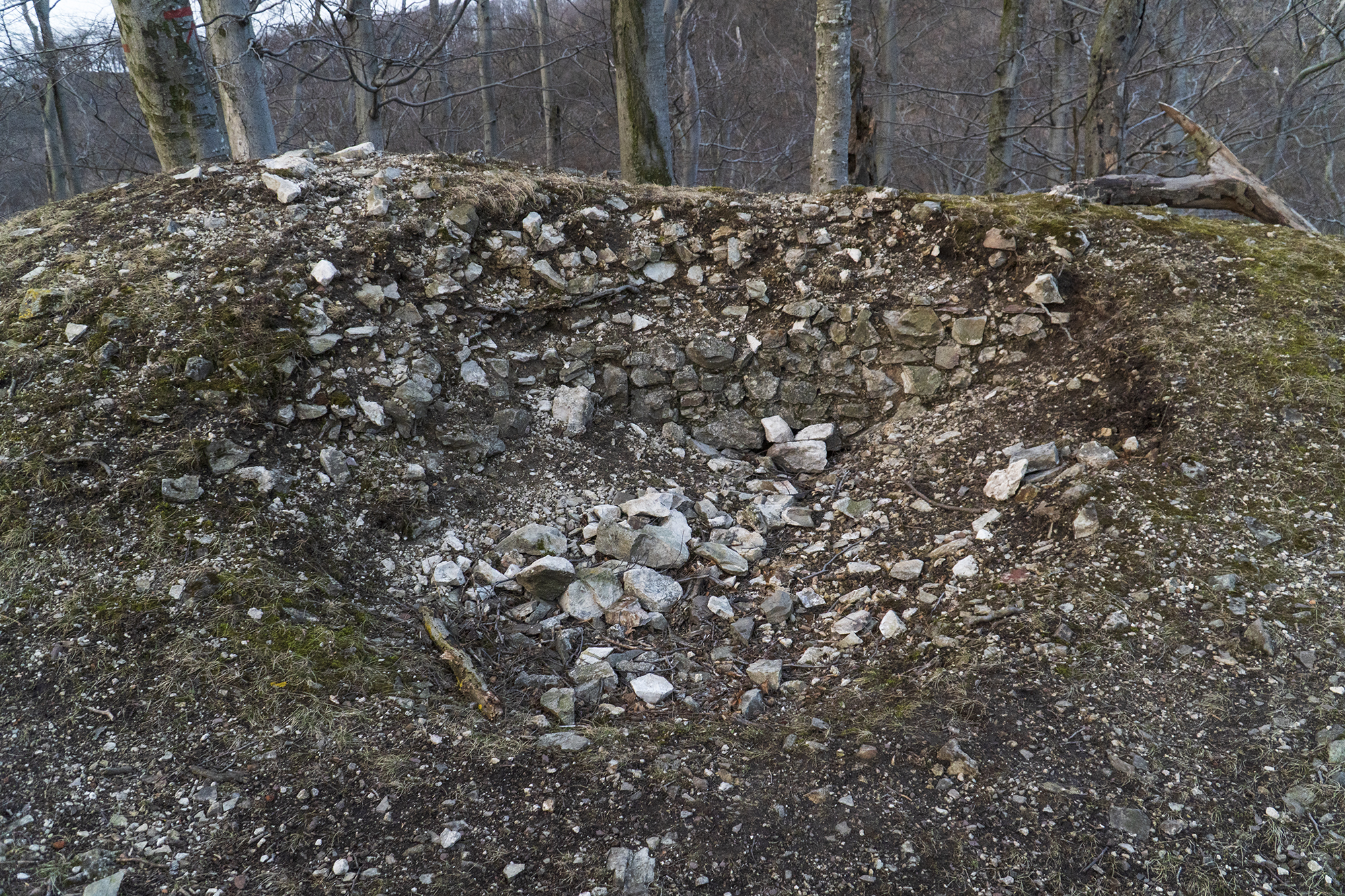
- Remains of a tower at Kuchyňa Castle

Site information
- Type: Castle ruins
- Open to the public: Yes
- Condition: Ruined

Location
- Kuchyňa Castle (Slovakia)
- Location in Slovakia
- Coordinates: 48.4214814°N 17.1965639°E

Site history
- Built: 14th century

Kuchyňa Castle was a castle in the Little Carpathians near the municipality Kuchyňa in the Bratislava region, Slovakia. Only modest remains of certain parts of the castle are visible today. The ruins are situated at approximately 420 m above sea level.

The castle ruins were discovered in the 1980s and are generally less well-known than those of other regional castles, such as Biely Kameň and Pajštún Castle. Nonetheless, the site remains a popular hiking destination.

== History ==
Historical evidence relating to the Kuchyňa Castle is largely archaeological in nature. The castle does not explicitly appear in any written document. Its historical name is also unknown - "Kuchyňa Castle" is derived from the name of the nearby municipality. Nonetheless, there is no doubt that it really was a castle. The building had all the typical features of a medieval castle and was located in a strategic location on a hill. The castle was to the east likely accompanied by a settlement that formed its economic backbone. The castle was probably built at the beginning of the 14th century. For most if not all of its history it was owned by counts from Svätý Jur and Pezinok. When properties in the region passed from local aristocracy under the royal crown in 1543, the Kuchyňa Castle did not appear on the list, which suggests that it was already decrepit and abandoned at the time. This is corroborated by archaeological findings. More extensive archaeological excavations are needed to learn more about the history of the castle.

== Description ==
The oval core of the castle had at each end of the longitudinal axis a stone tower of approximately the same dimensions (internal space more than 4x4 m, masonry thickness 2 m), which were used not only for defense, but probably also for housing. In addition to the dimensions, the presumption of the residential function is indicated by fragments of tiles with embossed decoration, which come from the heating equipment in the rooms and testify to rich furnishings of the interiors. The sloping blocks of masonry on the slopes suggest that the extended platform between the towers may have been protected by a wall and probably contained only small buildings. No traces of it have been preserved on the surface. In the lower position, the inner castle was surrounded by fortifications, perhaps a rampart with a palisade, in the milder southern side doubled by another fortification arch. In this area there were perhaps farm buildings, indicated by a hole in the northwest.

== See also ==
- Pajštún Castle
- Čeklís Castle
- Biely Kameň
- Dračí hrádok
- List of castles in Slovakia
