= Borinka =

Borinka Pozsonyborostyánkő
- Municipality
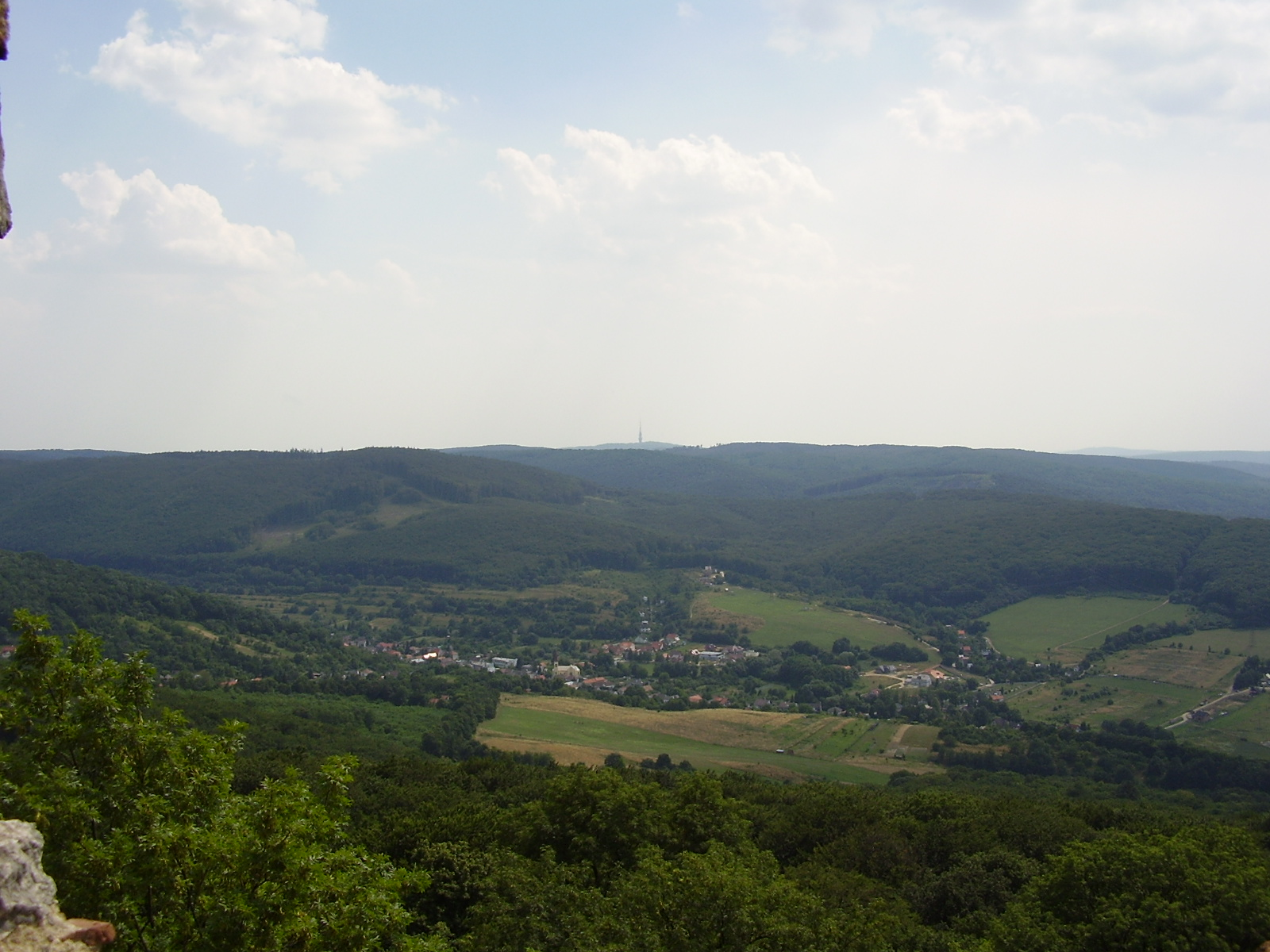
- Borinka from the Pajštún castle. Kamzík TV Tower can be seen on the horizon

- Flag

- Location of Borinka in the Bratislava Region Location of Borinka in Slovakia
- Coordinates: 48.27°N 17.08°E
- Country: Slovakia
- Region: Bratislava Region
- District: Malacky District
- First mentioned: 1273

Area
  - Total: 15.80 km^{2} (6.10 sq mi)
- Elevation: 263 m (863 ft)

Population (2025)
  - Total: 944
- Time zone: UTC+1 (CET)
  - Summer (DST): UTC+2 (CEST)
- Postal code: 900 32
- Area code: +421 2
- Vehicle registration plate (until 2022): MA
- Website: www.obecborinka.sk

Borinka (Hungarian: Pozsonyborostyánkő) is a village and municipality in western Slovakia in Malacky District in the Bratislava Region, at the foothills of the Little Carpathians, best known for the Pajštún Castle, and has many weekend homes (Slovak: chata). Dračí hrádok are another castle ruins located in its vicinity. The village is around 5 km east of Stupava and around 15 km north of Bratislava.

== Names and etymology ==
Older Slovak name Pajštún derives from German Ballenstein or Paulenstein. The current name Borinka (1948) is a result of mistake. Pajštún was incorrectly associated with Szuhabaranka (1273 castrum Borynka) and renamed during post-war trials to return to older Slovak names.

== Geography ==
The municipality lies at an altitude of 263 metres (863 ft) and covers an area of 15.80 km^{2} (6.10 sq mi) (2025).

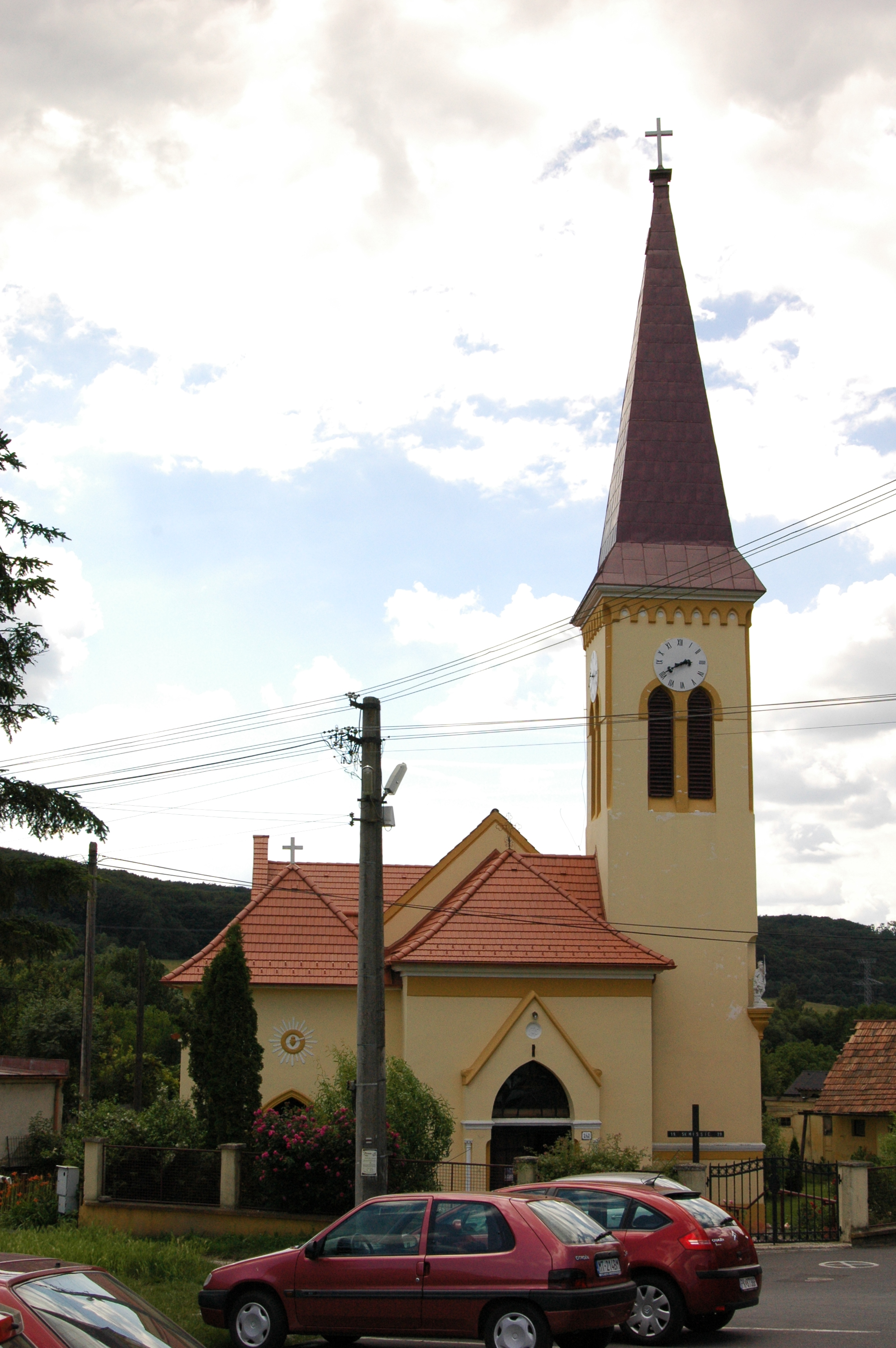
Borinka church

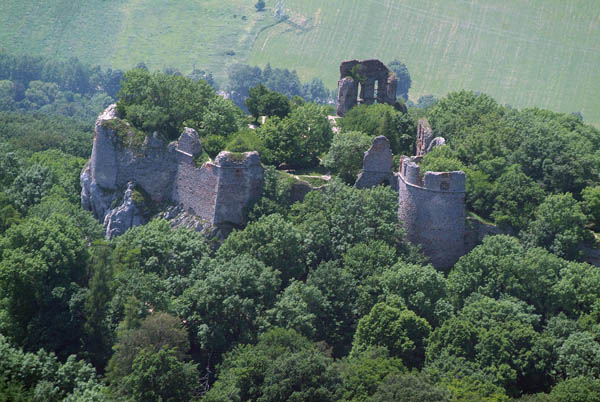
Pajštún castle

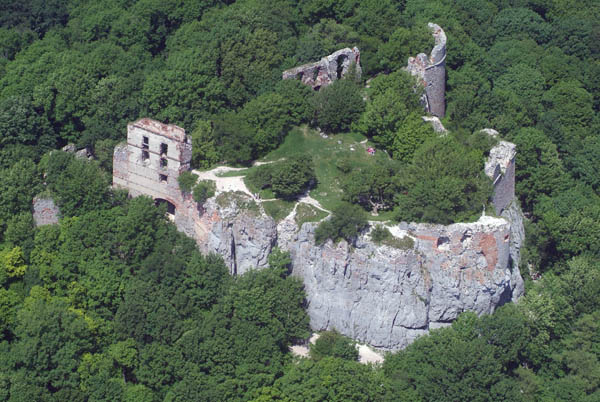
Pajštún castle

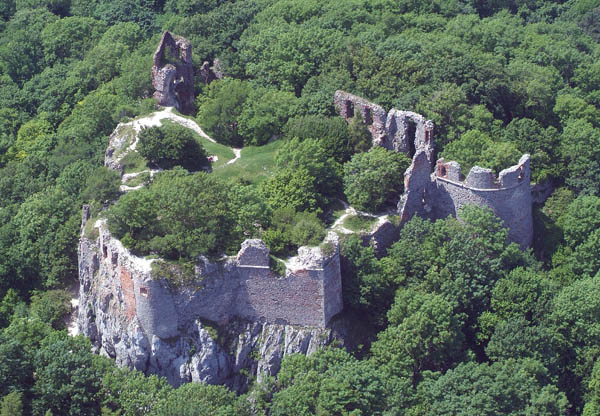
Pajštún castle

== Population ==
Population statistic (10 years)
Year	1995	2005	2015	2025
Count	420	535	747	944
Difference		+27.38%	+39.62%	+26.37%

Population statistic
Year	2024	2025
Count	904	944
Difference		+4.42%

It has a population of 944 people (31 December 2025).

=== Ethnicity ===
Census 2021 (1+ %)
Ethnicity	Number	Fraction
Slovak	777	90.34%
Not found out	65	7.55%
Other	12	1.39%
Total	860	

In year 2021 was 860 people by ethnicity 777 as Slovak, 65 as Not found out, 12 as Other, 8 as Hungarian, 5 as Czech, 4 as Russian, 3 as Rusyn, 2 as Ukrainian, 1 as Chinese, 1 as Italian, 1 as Serbian, 1 as Silesian, 1 as Polish, 1 as German, 1 as English and 1 as Albanian.

Note on population: The difference values of population numbers in the table "Population statistic" and in the sections "Ethnicity" & "Religion" is caused by the use of various statistical methods.

=== Religion ===
Census 2021 (1+ %)
Religion	Number	Fraction
None	383	44.53%
Roman Catholic Church	360	41.86%
Not found out	64	7.44%
Evangelical Church	9	1.05%
Ad hoc movements	9	1.05%
Total	860	

In year 2021 was 860 people by religion 383 from None, 360 from Roman Catholic Church, 64 from Not found out, 9 from Evangelical Church, 9 from Ad hoc movements, 7 from Greek Catholic Church, 6 from Other, 4 from Apostolic Church, 3 from Islam, 2 from Eastern Orthodox Church, 2 from Paganism and natural spirituality, 2 from Other and not ascertained christian church, 2 from Hinduism, 2 from Church of the Brethren, 2 from Buddhism, 1 from Calvinist Church, 1 from Jehovah's Witnesses and 1 from Baptists Church.

== Genealogical resources ==
The records for genealogical research are available at the state archive "Statny Archiv in Bratislava, Slovakia"

- Roman Catholic church records (births/marriages/deaths): 1670-1921 (parish B)

== See also ==
- List of municipalities and towns in Slovakia
