= Marianka =

- Municipality
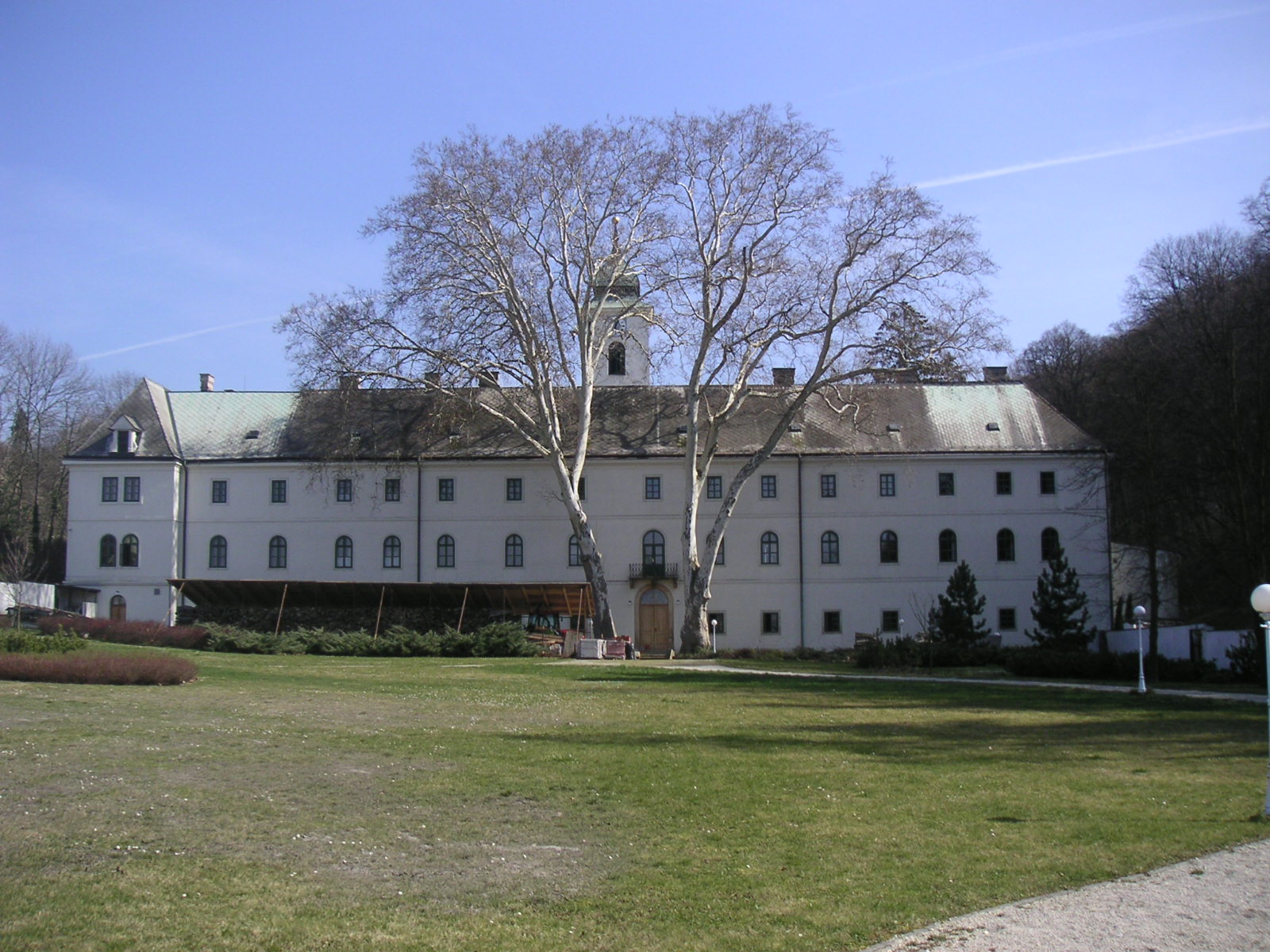
- Marianka Monastery

- Flag

- Location of Marianka in the Bratislava Region Location of Marianka in Slovakia
- Coordinates: 48.25°N 17.06°E
- Country: Slovakia
- Region: Bratislava Region
- District: Malacky District
- First mentioned: 1367

Area
  - Total: 3.22 km^{2} (1.24 sq mi)
- Elevation: 230 m (750 ft)

Population (2025)
  - Total: 2,362
- Time zone: UTC+1 (CET)
  - Summer (DST): UTC+2 (CEST)
- Postal code: 900 33
- Area code: +421 3
- Vehicle registration plate (until 2022): MA
- Website: www.marianka.sk

Marianka is a village and municipality in western Slovakia in Malacky District in the Bratislava region, in the foothills of the Little Carpathians. The village is the oldest pilgrimage site in Slovakia and the first pilgrimage site dedicated to Virgin Mary in the area of former Hungarian Kingdom.

It used to be as famous as the well known Mariazell in Austria and the Polish pilgrimage place Częstochowa. The communist regime between years 1948-1989 suppressed all religious activity and the village as a pilgrimage site was planned for demise, however the village survived.

== History ==
In historical records the village was first mentioned in 1367. First settlers however inhabited area of present-day Marianka already in primeval times. Settlement dating to late Bronze Age located above the slate quarry was discovered during research between 1986 - 1990. Fragments of iron utensils were found along with unusual convenience, a painted floor.

The cornerstone of the church was laid by Louis I. the Great in 1377, in response to spreading word about rumoured miracles. The church was finished in 1380 and its administration was given to Order of St. Paul. Pauline Fathers administered the parish for 400 years.

During the time Marianka was several times raided by Ottoman forces. The statue of Virgin Mary had to be hidden in Pajštún fortress. The number of pilgrims rose with its peak in 1730 when 50,000 visitors attended the church service. To meet the growing number of visitors, Chapel of St. Anne was built in 1691. Among prominent visitors of Marianka were Sigmund, Leopold I. and Joseph I. Emperor Charles III. came to visit Marianka right after his coronation as Hungarian king in 1712 from Bratislava.

Maria Theresa visited Marianka twice with her son Joseph II. Marianka was also a favorite marriage place for local nobility. There was a custom that during this occasion they were giving to the Virgin Mary their wedding rings and also donating robes for the statue made out of their bridal clothes.

Turning point in village's history was abolishment of contemplative orders by Joseph II in 1786, because of which the Pauline order had to leave Marianka. From this point onwards Marianka was managed by the local diocese. A new development of the pilgrimage place began in 1927 when Congregatio fratrum consolatorum de Gethsemani managed the site until 1950, when the communist regime abolished all catholic orders. After November 1989 they returned to Marianka and remain until today.

== Geography ==
The municipality lies at an altitude of 230 metres (750 ft) and covers an area of 3.22 km^{2} (1.24 sq mi) (2025).

== Population ==
Population statistic (10 years)
Year	1995	2005	2015	2025
Count	921	1065	1864	2362
Difference		+15.63%	+75.02%	+26.71%

Population statistic
Year	2024	2025
Count	2341	2362
Difference		+0.89%

It has a population of 2362 people (31 December 2025).

=== Ethnicity ===
Census 2021 (1+ %)
Ethnicity	Number	Fraction
Slovak	2081	91.11%
Not found out	133	5.82%
Czech	36	1.57%
Other	30	1.31%
Total	2284	

In year 2021 was 2284 people by ethnicity 2081 as Slovak, 133 as Not found out, 36 as Czech, 30 as Other, 16 as Hungarian, 13 as Ukrainian, 11 as Russian, 9 as Rusyn, 7 as German, 6 as Polish, 4 as Moravian, 3 as Serbian, 2 as Croatian, 2 as Bulgarian, 2 as English, 2 as Albanian, 1 as Chinese, 1 as Romani and 1 as Austrian.

Note on population: The difference values of population numbers in the table "Population statistic" and in the sections "Ethnicity" & "Religion" is caused by the use of various statistical methods.

=== Religion ===
Census 2021 (1+ %)
Religion	Number	Fraction
Roman Catholic Church	1127	49.34%
None	832	36.43%
Not found out	130	5.69%
Evangelical Church	70	3.06%
Greek Catholic Church	24	1.05%
Total	2284	

In year 2021 was 2284 people by religion 1127 from Roman Catholic Church, 832 from None, 130 from Not found out, 70 from Evangelical Church, 24 from Greek Catholic Church, 19 from Other, 14 from Church of the Brethren, 12 from Eastern Orthodox Church, 12 from Ad hoc movements, 7 from Other and not ascertained christian church, 7 from Jehovah's Witnesses, 6 from Christian Congregations in Slovakia, 5 from Paganism and natural spirituality, 4 from Old Catholic Church, 3 from United Methodist Church, 3 from Baptists Church, 2 from Calvinist Church, 2 from Islam, 2 from Apostolic Church, 1 from Jewish community, 1 from Czechoslovak Hussite Church and 1 from Buddhism.

== List of historical monuments ==
- Pilgrimage Church of the Virgin Mary Birth
- Chapel of St. Anne
- Rotunda Chapel of the Holy Well
- Shrine to the Virgin Mary resembling cave in Lourdes, France
- Marian route (consisting of six chapels)
- Statues of St. Anthony and St. Paul, the Hermits
- Statue of St. Paul the Hermit
- Statue of St. John Nepomuk

== Legends about miracles ==
There are two legends concerning the statue of Virgin Mary, nowadays placed upon altar in local church. The older legend tells about miraculous healing of children. It speaks of the bloodthirsty bandit, based in the local forests. Although his newborn child was "a beast more similar to animal than human" and its affliction was considered as God's punishment, he still continued in his brutal ways. But his wife prayed sincerely and asked for mercy and her prayers was heard out. An apparition led her to the stream where her children "after washing, turned into healthy and happy children." The news about the miraculous strength of the stream spread all around the country. Large queues of blind, crippled and sick beggars rushed to Marianka with their prayers to drink and wash themselves in the blessed stream. They believed that the miraculous powers of the stream were directly from Virgin Mary, who is called "Healer of the sick" and "Comforter of the afflicted" in Marian litany.

The second legend tells the story of finding the Virgin Mary of Tálenská statue. The legend dating from the year 1030 speaks about its origin: a god-devoted pilgrim living in the forests carved it out of pear wood. Shortly after finishing the statue, dangerous times came. Country governors were fighting among themselves for the throne, while barbaric riders were raiding and destroying everything Christian. The pilgrim decided to save the statue and hid it in a hollow tree. Years after that, people used to come to this valley from around the country, seeking restoration either physical or spiritual, but none knew where the miracle was coming from. One day, an old blind beggar who was praying in the forest, heard a voice from the heavens. The voice told him that if he washes his eyes in the nearby stream a miracle will happen. As soon as the beggar washed his eyes in the water, they opened and he could see. He saw the statue of the Virgin Mary of Tálenská in the stream and took it from there. He made a pedestal for the statue, and placed an image of Virgin Mary beside it. There he came often to pray to the statue. Although these legends are not regarded as reliable historical source, there are several remarks regarding the Mariathal miracles in the records of the Pauline cloister dating up to year 1661.
