= Chapel of the Holy Well =

Chapel in Marianka, Slovakia

Coordinates: 48°14′50.53″N 17°4′0.75″E

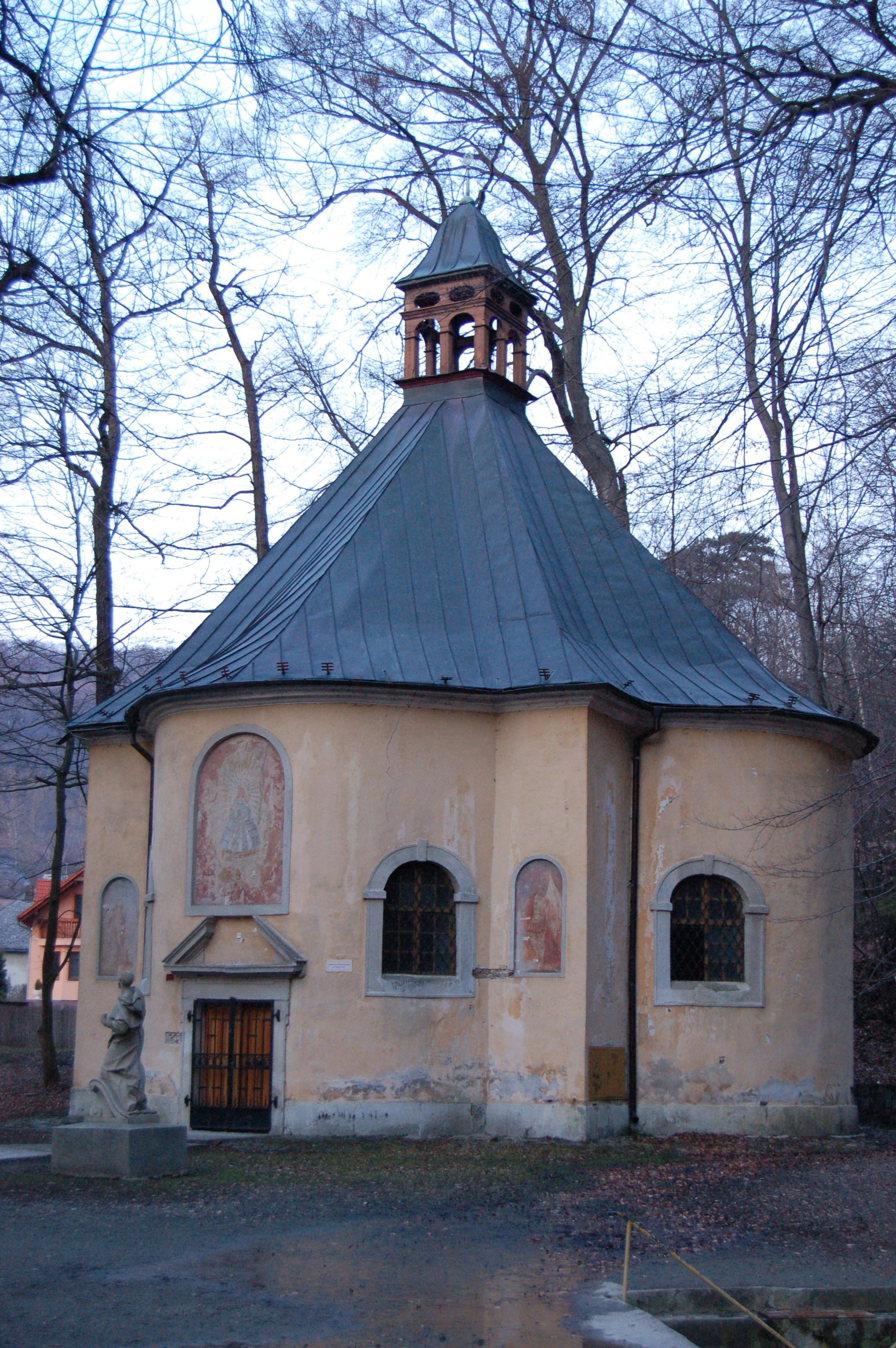
Chapel of the Holy well

Chapel of the Holy well is a chapel located in Marianka, Slovakia. Rotunda Chapel of the Holy well was commissioned in 1696 for 1000 golden coins by earl Paul Eszterhazy and local baron Ján Macholány, who can be found pictured with his family on one of the ceiling frescos. In 1722, a renovated baroque altar was built, replacing the original one. In 1877, the statues of St. Anthony and St. Paul the Hermits were erected in front of the chapel. These statues came from the workshop of Rafael Donner, eventually being replaced by replicas created in Brno in 1981. Originals were transferred to the Slovak National Gallery, where they are a part of the original Baroque Art exhibition. The chapel was constructed directly above the stream, out of which the water is directed to the front of the chapel directly accessible to the visitors. The stream beneath was reported to have miraculous healing effect on physically handicapped pilgrims visiting the site. In the book of Kummer from the record of the local cloister, 140 recoveries were reported between 1634 - 1730.
