= Laco Déczi =

Slovak-American musician (born 1938)

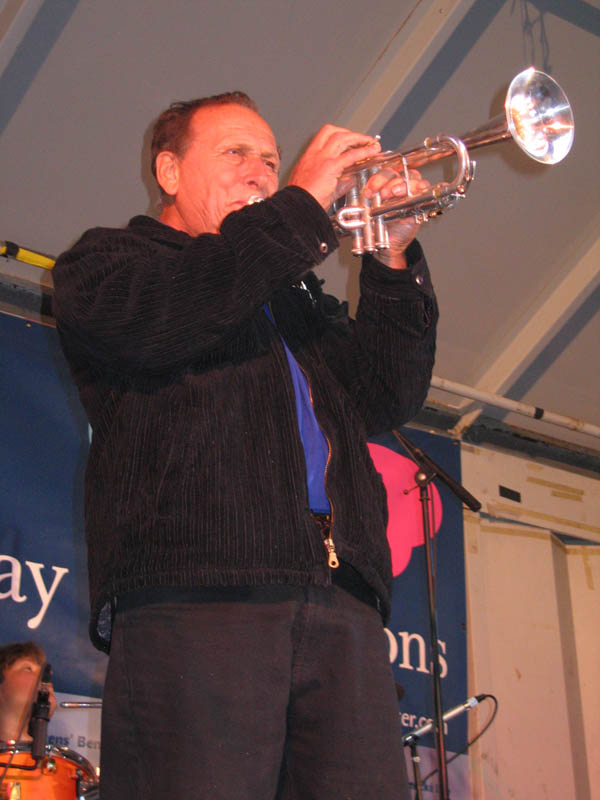
- Laco Déczi performing at Czech street fest in 2006

Background information
- Birth name: Ladislav Déczi
- Born: March 29, 1938 (age 87); Čeklís, Czechoslovakia
- Genres: Jazz
- Instrument: Trumpet
- Years active: 1962–present
- Website: www.lacodeczi.com

Ladislav "Laco" Déczi (29 March 1938, Bernolákovo, Czechoslovakia) is a Slovak-American jazz trumpeter and composer, leader of Jazz Celula New York.
