= Kuchyňa =

Kuchyňa Konyha
- Municipality
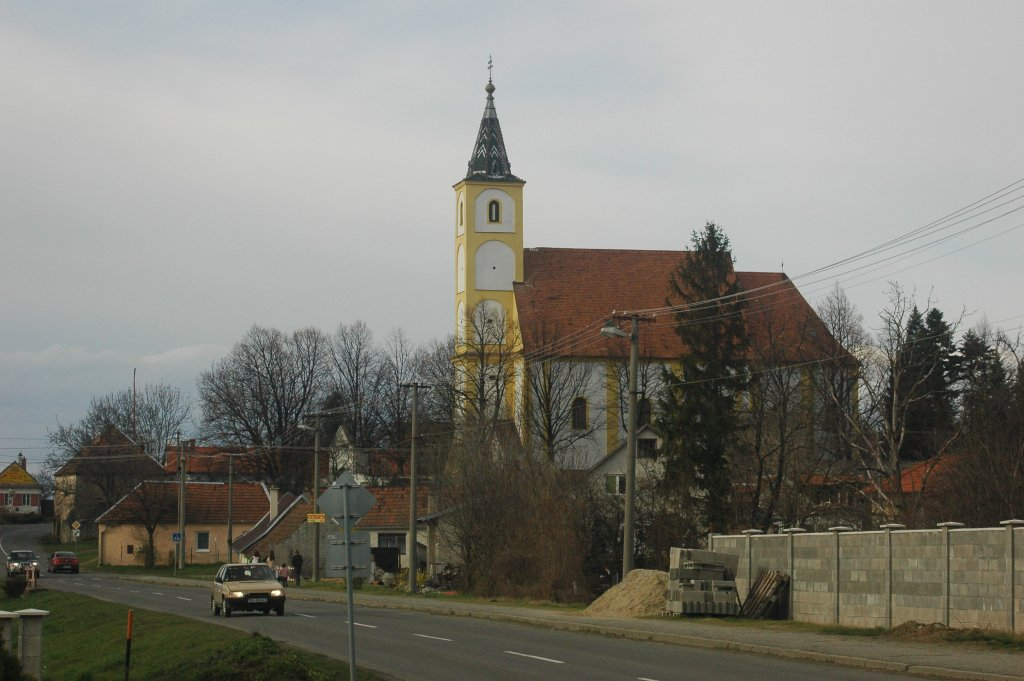
- Saint Michael's church, Kuchyňa

- Flag

- Location of Kuchyňa in the Bratislava Region Location of Kuchyňa in Slovakia
- Coordinates: 48.40°N 17.17°E
- Country: Slovakia
- Region: Bratislava Region
- District: Malacky District
- First mentioned: 1206

Area
  - Total: 44.72 km^{2} (17.27 sq mi)
- Elevation: 253 m (830 ft)

Population (2025)
  - Total: 1,793
- Time zone: UTC+1 (CET)
  - Summer (DST): UTC+2 (CEST)
- Postal code: 900 52
- Area code: +421 34
- Vehicle registration plate (until 2022): MA
- Website: obeckuchyna.sk

Kuchyňa (Hungarian: Konyha, lit. 'Kitchen') is a municipality in the Malacky District in the Bratislava Region of western Slovakia close to the town of Malacky, north-west of Slovakia's capital Bratislava. Nearby castle ruins of Kuchyňa Castle bear the name of the municipality.

The Kuchyňa airbase, often used by the US Air Force for training purposes, is located approximately 18 kilometers east of the city of Malacky.

== Geography ==
The municipality lies at an altitude of 253 metres (830 ft) and covers an area of 44.72 km^{2} (17.27 sq mi) (2025).

== Population ==
Population statistic (10 years)
Year	1995	2005	2015	2025
Count	1570	1661	1684	1793
Difference		+5.79%	+1.38%	+6.47%

Population statistic
Year	2024	2025
Count	1798	1793
Difference		−0.27%

It has a population of 1793 people (31 December 2025).

=== Ethnicity ===
Census 2021 (1+%)
Ethnicity	Number	Fraction
Slovak	1642	92.82%
Not found out	91	5.14%
Czech	19	1.07%
Total	1769	

In year 2021 was 1769 people by ethnicity 1642 as Slovak, 91 as Not found out, 19 as Czech, 17 as Romani, 11 as Hungarian, 11 as Other, 3 as Ukrainian, 3 as Rusyn, 1 as Austrian, 1 as German and 1 as Croatian.

Note on population: The difference values of population numbers in the table "Population statistic" and in the sections "Ethnicity" & "Religion" is caused by the use of various statistical methods.

=== Religion ===
Census 2021 (1+%)
Religion	Number	Fraction
Roman Catholic Church	1166	65.91%
None	452	25.55%
Not found out	89	5.03%
Evangelical Church	20	1.13%
Total	1769	

In year 2021 was 1769 people by religion 1166 from Roman Catholic Church, 452 from None, 89 from Not found out, 20 from Evangelical Church, 13 from Other, 9 from Greek Catholic Church, 6 from Ad hoc movements, 4 from Eastern Orthodox Church, 3 from Christian Congregations in Slovakia, 2 from Calvinist Church, 1 from Paganism and natural spirituality, 1 from Other and not ascertained christian church, 1 from Islam, 1 from Hinduism and 1 from Buddhism.

== See also ==
- Kuchyňa Castle
