= Bernolákovo =

- Municipality
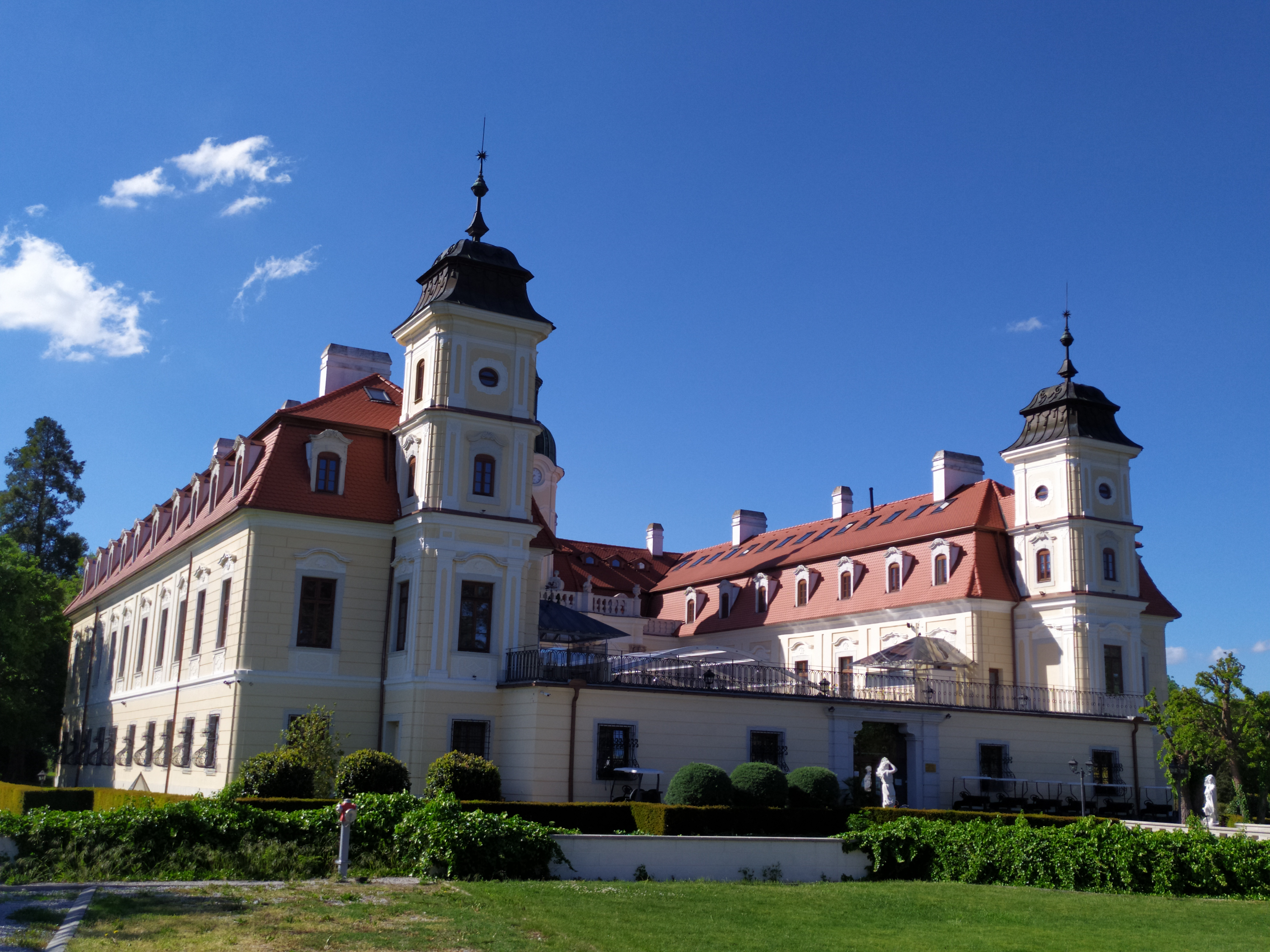
- Bernolákovo Castle

- Flag Coat of arms

- Location of Bernolákovo in the Bratislava Region Location of Bernolákovo in Slovakia
- Coordinates: 48.21°N 17.29°E
- Country: Slovakia
- Region: Bratislava Region
- District: Senec District
- First mentioned: 1209

Area
  - Total: 28.43 km^{2} (10.98 sq mi)
- Elevation: 141 m (463 ft)

Population (2025)
  - Total: 10,296
- Time zone: UTC+1 (CET)
  - Summer (DST): UTC+2 (CEST)
- Postal code: 900 27
- Area code: +421 11
- Vehicle registration plate (until 2022): SC
- Website: www.bernolakovo.sk

Bernolákovo (German: Lanschütz, Hungarian: Cseklész, former Slovak names: Čeklís, Čeklýs) is a village and municipality in western Slovakia in Senec District in the Bratislava Region.

== Names and etymology ==
The Slovak name for the village, Lǫžnica, originates from the German name Lanschütz, given by the builder and owner, the Esterházy Family, in 1714. The name Lanschütz likely means "long meadow" in German. The Slovak word for "riparian forest" is luh, which comes from the Proto-Slavic word lǫgъ.

During its longest and historically most relevant period of existence as part of Hungary and the Austro-Hungarian Empire, the village was known by the Hungarian name Cseklész (Čeklís). After World War II, the new communist regime renamed the village and the nearby castle to Bernolákovo, after the Slovak linguist Anton Bernolák.

== Geography ==
The municipality lies at an altitude of 141 metres (463 ft) and covers an area of 28.43 km^{2} (10.98 sq mi) (2025).

== Population ==
Population statistic (10 years)
Year	1995	2005	2015	2025
Count	4423	4973	6408	10,296
Difference		+12.43%	+28.85%	+60.67%

Population statistic
Year	2024	2025
Count	10,151	10,296
Difference		+1.42%

It has a population of 10,296 people (31 December 2025).

Over the course of 2010s, the city experienced fast growth due to the proximity to Bratislava. The 2021 census has found the number of houses increased sharply from 1,773 in 2011 to 3,724 in 2021, representing the fastest growth rate out of all municipalities in Slovakia. The new housing construction was associated with the fast growth of population from less than 6,000 inhabitants in 2011 to the current population of more than 9,000.

=== Ethnicity ===
Census 2021 (1+ %)
Ethnicity	Number	Fraction
Slovak	7890	89.64%
Not found out	689	7.82%
Hungarian	105	1.19%
Czech	89	1.01%
Total	8801	

In year 2021 was 8801 people by ethnicity 7890 as Slovak, 689 as Not found out, 105 as Hungarian, 89 as Czech, 55 as Other, 49 as Rusyn, 34 as Ukrainian, 20 as Russian, 18 as German, 14 as Croatian, 13 as Chinese, 13 as Romanian, 12 as French, 10 as Serbian, 8 as Vietnamese, 8 as Austrian, 8 as Polish, 7 as Bulgarian, 7 as Albanian, 6 as Moravian, 5 as Irish, 5 as English, 4 as Jewish, 4 as Turkish, 4 as Italian, 4 as Romani and 2 as Canadian.

Note on population: The difference values of population numbers in the table "Population statistic" and in the sections "Ethnicity" & "Religion" is caused by the use of various statistical methods.

=== Religion ===
Census 2021 (1+ %)
Religion	Number	Fraction
Roman Catholic Church	3791	43.07%
None	3309	37.6%
Not found out	668	7.59%
Evangelical Church	390	4.43%
Baptists Church	154	1.75%
Greek Catholic Church	96	1.09%
Total	8801	

In year 2021 was 8801 people by religion 3791 from Roman Catholic Church, 3309 from None, 668 from Not found out, 390 from Evangelical Church, 154 from Baptists Church, 96 from Greek Catholic Church, 74 from Apostolic Church, 52 from Eastern Orthodox Church, 46 from Other, 45 from Christian Congregations in Slovakia, 37 from Other and not ascertained christian church, 33 from Ad hoc movements, 22 from Buddhism, 21 from Calvinist Church, 20 from Seventh-day Adventist Church, 8 from Jehovah's Witnesses, 8 from Islam, 8 from Church of the Brethren, 5 from Paganism and natural spirituality, 3 from Jewish community, 3 from Old Catholic Church, 3 from United Methodist Church, 2 from Hinduism, 1 from New Apostolic Church, 1 from Czechoslovak Hussite Church and 1 from Bahá'i Community.

== See also ==
- List of municipalities and towns in Slovakia
- Čeklís Castle

== Famous people ==
- Ján Popluhár, Slovak football player
- Laco Déczi, Slovak-American jazz trumpeter and composer

== Genealogical resources ==
The records for genealogical research are available at the state archive "Statny Archiv in Bratislava, Slovakia"

- Roman Catholic church records (births/marriages/deaths): 1687-1930 (parish A)
- Reformated church records (births/marriages/deaths): 1787-1924 (parish B)
