= Stupava, Slovakia =

Stupava Stomfa
- Municipality
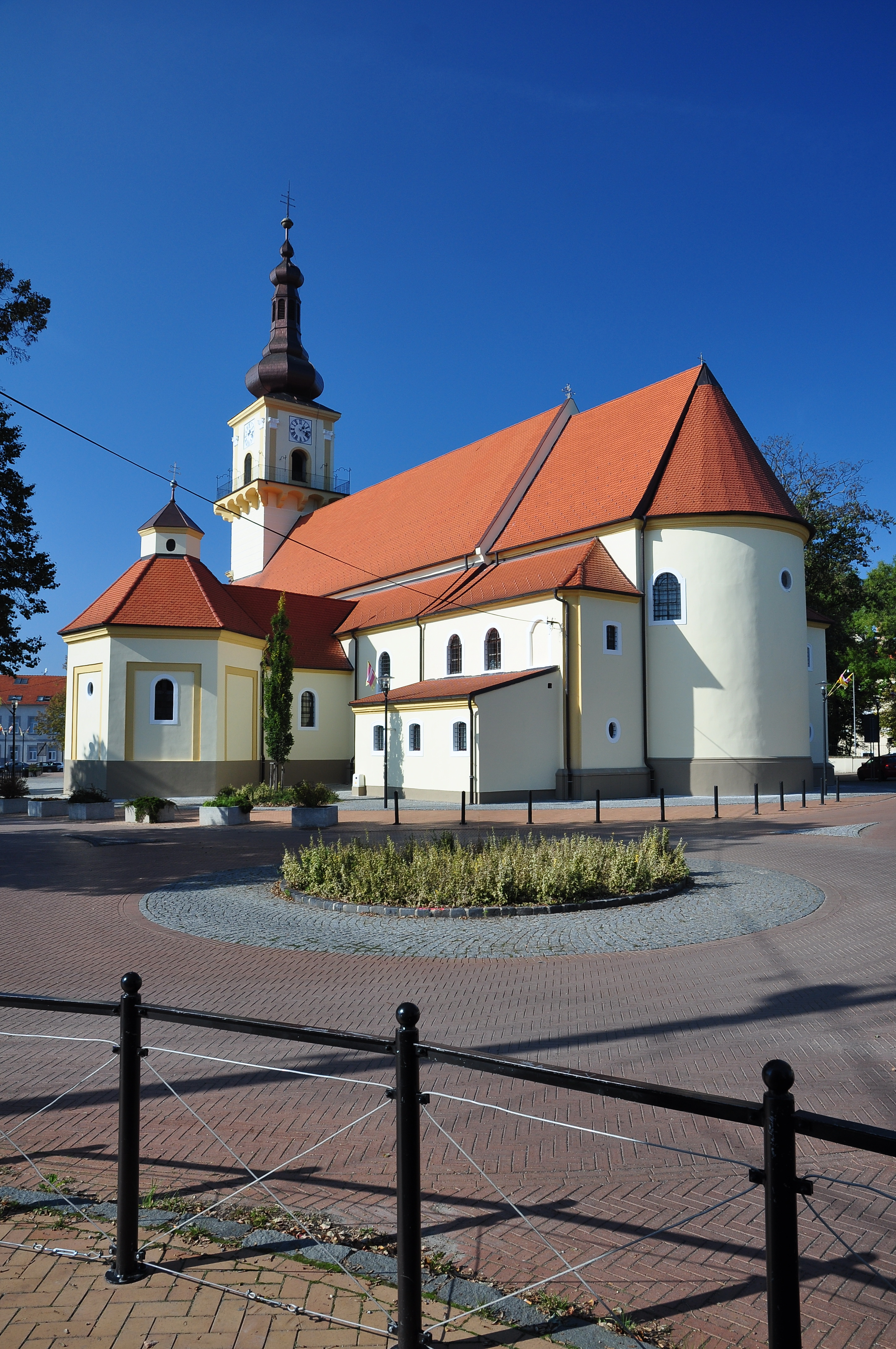
- Church of Saint Stephen

- Flag Coat of arms

- Location of Stupava in the Bratislava Region Location of Stupava in Slovakia
- Coordinates: 48°16′29.1″N 17°01.904′0″E 48°16′29.1″N 17°01.904′0″E
- Country: Slovakia
- Region: Bratislava Region
- District: Malacky District
- First mentioned: 1269

Government
  - Mayor: Peter Novisedlák

Area
  - Total: 67.17 km^{2} (25.93 sq mi)
- Elevation: 178 m (584 ft)

Population (2025)
  - Total: 12,979
- Time zone: UTC+1 (CET)
  - Summer (DST): UTC+2 (CEST)
- Postal code: 900 31
- Area code: +421 2
- Vehicle registration plate (until 2022): MA
- Website: www.stupava.sk

Stupava (German: Stampfen; Hungarian: Stomfa) is a town in western Slovakia. It is situated in the Malacky District, Bratislava Region.

== Etymology ==
The name is derived from Proto-Slavic stǫpa (Slovak: stupa): a wooden bowl carved from a tree trunk, but also the name of various crushing and pressing tools.

== Geography ==
The municipality lies at an altitude of 178 metres (584 ft) and covers an area of 67.17 km^{2} (25.93 sq mi) (2025).

The town is located in the Záhorie lowland, under the Little Carpathians, around 15 km (9 mi) north of Bratislava at an altitude of 182 metres. It has a land area of 67.17 km^{2} (26 sq mi). Apart from the core part of the city, Mást (German: Maaßt, Hungarian: Mászt), located just south of the core part of the city, is another part of Stupava. It has been initially a separate village with ethnic Croatian majority, which was formally annexed by Stupava in 1953.

== History ==
Traces of habitation go back to the Bronze Age, and the first known inhabitants were the Celts. A Roman-style bathhouse from the 3rd century AD has often been interpreted as a Roman military base or as a trading hub for Roman merchants outside of their Empire, but it may as well be the seat of a romanised germanic chieftain. The first written mention about the town was in 1269 in a document of King Béla IV under the name Ztumpa. In the second half of the 13th century the now-ruined Pajštún Castle in the Little Carpathians was built. It was developing mainly as an agricultural and trading settlement. The name of the town comes from the pressing mills called stupa on the Stupavský potok brook, which were used for extracting oil from flax and hemp.

== Landmarks ==
- Stupava Castle, originally built as a water castle, rebuilt in the 17th century to the Renaissance château, now serving as a retirement home
- Roman Catholic church in Baroque style from the first half of the 17th century
- Baroque-style Calvary chapel from the beginning of the 18th century

== Population ==
Historical population
Year	Pop.	±%
1970	6,863	—
1980	8,062	+17.5%
1991	7,834	−2.8%
2001	8,063	+2.9%
2011	9,282	+15.1%
2021	12,595	+35.7%
Source: Censuses

Population statistic (10 years)
Year	1995	2005	2015	2025
Count	7844	8433	10,597	12,979
Difference		+7.50%	+25.66%	+22.47%

Population statistic
Year	2024	2025
Count	12,850	12,979
Difference		+1.00%

It has a population of 12,979 people (31 December 2025).

=== Ethnicity ===
Census 2021 (1+%)
Ethnicity	Number	Fraction
Slovak	11,426	90.71%
Not found out	918	7.28%
Czech	170	1.34%
Total	12,595	

In year 2021 was 12,595 people by ethnicity 11,426 as Slovak, 918 as Not found out, 170 as Czech, 100 as Hungarian, 83 as Other, 58 as Rusyn, 38 as German, 30 as Ukrainian, 22 as Russian, 15 as Polish, 13 as Serbian, 10 as Croatian, 9 as Italian, 9 as Romanian, 8 as French, 8 as English, 8 as Albanian, 7 as Romani, 6 as Iranian, 5 as Austrian, 5 as Moravian, 4 as Chinese, 4 as Irish, 3 as Jewish, 2 as Turkish, 1 as Korean, 1 as Canadian, 1 as Greek and 1 as Bulgarian.

Note on population: The difference values of population numbers in the table "Population statistic" and in the sections "Ethnicity" & "Religion" is caused by the use of various statistical methods.

=== Religion ===
Census 2021 (1+%)
Religion	Number	Fraction
Roman Catholic Church	6032	47.89%
None	4811	38.2%
Not found out	894	7.1%
Evangelical Church	286	2.27%
Greek Catholic Church	161	1.28%
Total	12,595	

In year 2021 was 12,595 people by religion 6032 from Roman Catholic Church, 4811 from None, 894 from Not found out, 286 from Evangelical Church, 161 from Greek Catholic Church, 53 from Eastern Orthodox Church, 51 from Other, 49 from Ad hoc movements, 43 from Christian Congregations in Slovakia, 42 from Calvinist Church, 31 from Buddhism, 20 from Other and not ascertained christian church, 19 from Jehovah's Witnesses, 18 from Bahá'i Community, 16 from Paganism and natural spirituality, 14 from Church of the Brethren, 12 from Islam, 8 from Jewish community, 6 from Baptists Church, 6 from Apostolic Church, 5 from United Methodist Church, 5 from Czechoslovak Hussite Church, 4 from Hinduism, 3 from Seventh-day Adventist Church, 3 from Church of Jesus Christ of Latter-day Saints, 2 from Old Catholic Church and 1 from New Apostolic Church.

== Twin towns — sister cities ==
Stupava is twinned with:

- Ivančice, Czech Republic
- Kuřim, Czech Republic
- Łowicz, Poland
- Nagykovácsi, Hungary
- Svoge, Bulgaria
