= Biely Kameň =

Ruins of a Gothic castle in Slovakia

- Svätý Jur in Slovakia
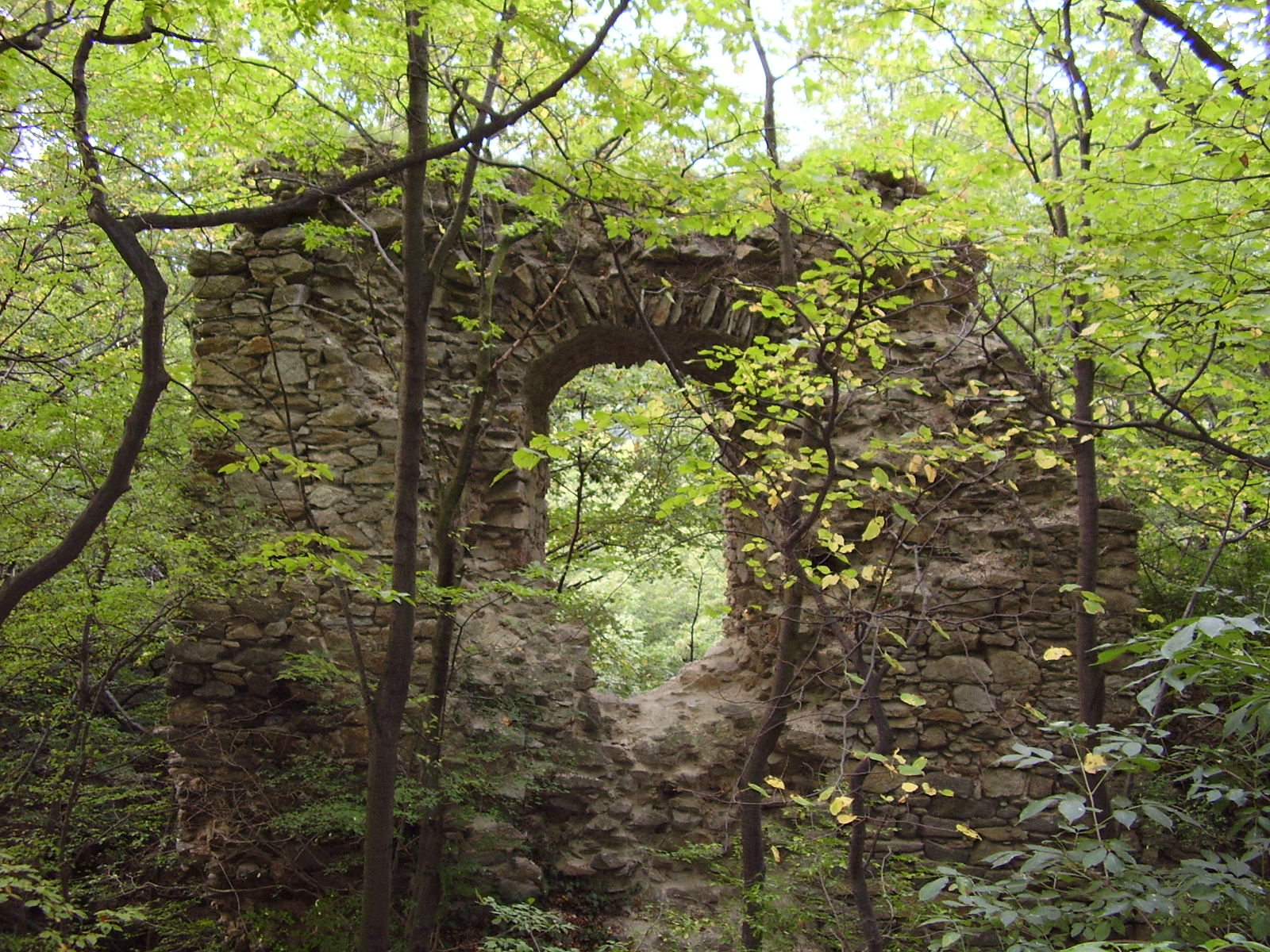
- Remains of a Gothic window at Biely Kameň

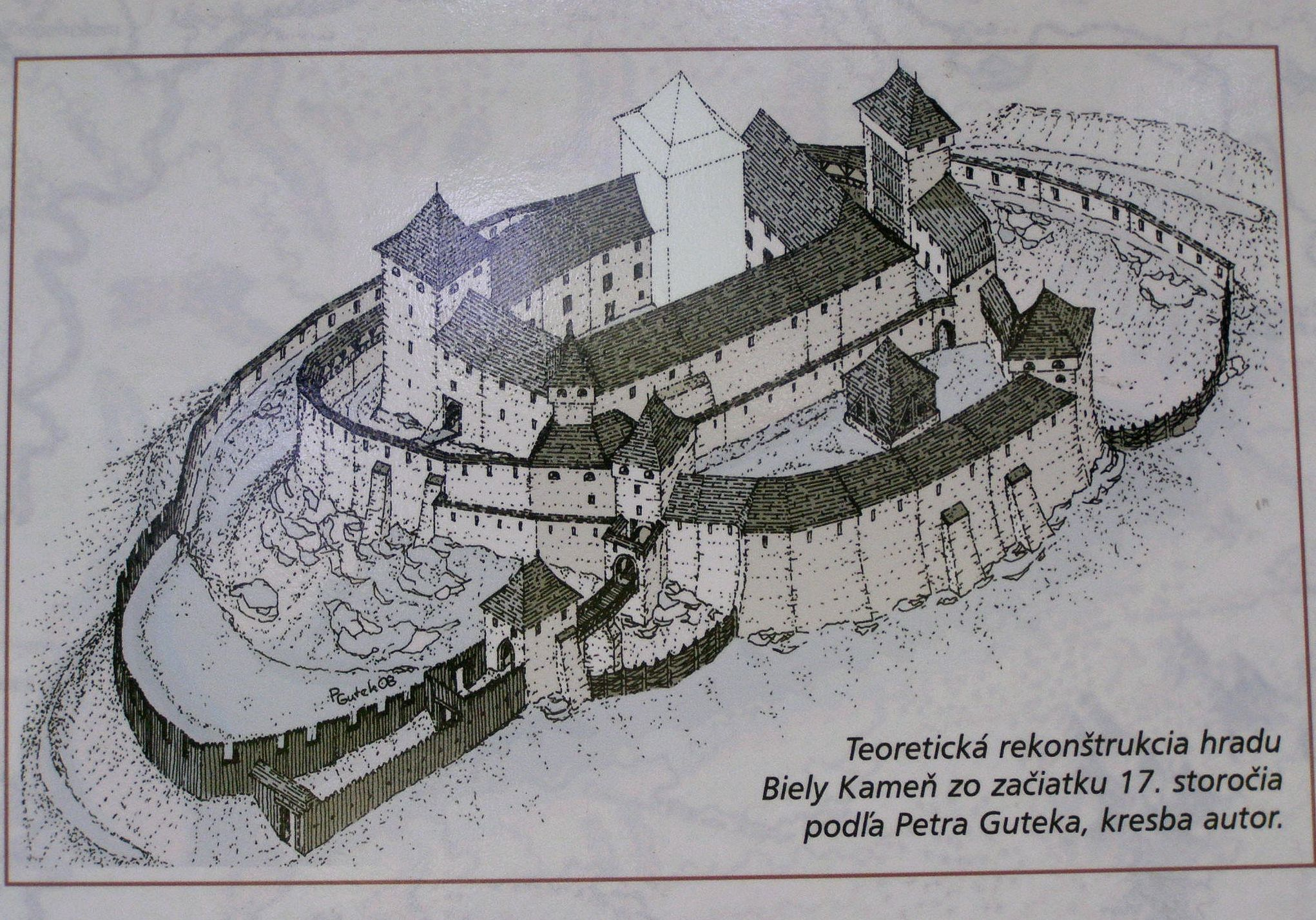
- Likely look of the castle in the 17th century

Site information
- Type: Castle ruins
- Open to the public: Yes
- Condition: Ruined

Location
- Svätý Jur (Slovakia)
- Location in Slovakia
- Coordinates: 48.261111°N 17.196389°E

Site history
- Built: 13th century

Biely Kameň (literally White Stone in English) are the ruins of a Gothic castle located on a wooded hill above the town of Svätý Jur in the Pezinok district in the Bratislava region, Slovakia. The name Biely Kameň became commonplace in the 1980s. The castle is also known as Svätojurský hrad (St. George castle).

Biely Kameň served as a fortified seat above Svätý Jur since the 13th century until 1663 when it was finally abandoned by its owners. The castle was likely established in response to and not long after Tatar raids in 1241-1242.

Since 2002, the ruins are recognized as a national cultural monument but remain freely and publicly accessible. Most tourists visit the site from the nearby town of Svätý Jur.

== History ==
Biely Kameň was built at some point before 1271 on a hill opposite an older local fort situated across the valley and served as the seat of the svätojurská (St. George) line of counts from Svätý Jur and Pezinok. The initiator of the construction was Count Abraham I. The hill chosen for construction was located about 1 km from Svätý Jur. The first written mention of the castle dates to 1271 when it was conquered by Ottokar II of Bohemia during his spring expedition to the Kingdom of Hungary. At the end of the 1280s, units of the Habsburg Duke Albrecht I attacked and occupied Biely Kameň. At that time, the castle consisted of the main residential tower, the palace part, farm buildings and a castle wall above a dry moat. During the second half of the 14th century, the great-grandchildren of Count Abraham I had the castle rebuilt in the Gothic style and added an outer castle. This created a well-fortified stone fortress with several towers, enlarged storage spaces and an extended palace with a Gothic chapel.

The local families of nobles retained ownership of Biely Kameň until their extinction in 1543. Upon the death of the last count, ownership of the castle was seized by Ferdinand I, Holy Roman Emperor and King of Hungary. The king leased the castle to one of his military commanders, Gaspar I. from Serednje. This was a strategic decision anticipating a possible Ottoman invasion from the southeast. The castle was already in considerable disrepair around this time, as evidenced by inspections in 1554 and 1560. The fate of Biely Kameň was thus rather similar to that of the Pajštún Castle located just 20 km away on the other side of the Little Carpathians. Gaspar II., nephew of Gaspar I., was the last owner of Biely Kameň for whom it also served as his seat. In the 17th century, the castle was owned by the noble family of Pálffy ab Erdöd. It became completely unused following an attack in 1663 by Crimean Tatars who were raiding in the service of the Ottomans.

== Description ==
The castle, originally occupying a relatively large area of the hill, has been preserved in the state of advanced disintegration. The core of the entire fortified complex is the upper rampart of an approximately rectangular ground plan, which was delimited around the perimeter by massive walls, still visible on the east side. The best preserved part of the castle is the short eastern wing with the remains of a Gothic brick vault. An extensive vaulted cellar has been preserved from the buildings on the north side of the courtyard.

The inner castle, protected by an irregular oval fortification, had only one gate on the northeast side, above which was a bastion. In addition to the tower with the gate, there were two other towers in the outer area. Around the outer wall were mostly farm buildings. The upper castle and the entire lower part had a considerable number of chambers which is indicative of its relatively large capacity. Ceramic water pipes connecting the castle with the town of Svätý Jur were found on the site.

Since 2020 a volunteering organization called Castrum Sancti Georgii has been carrying out restoration works on the ruins.

== Gallery ==
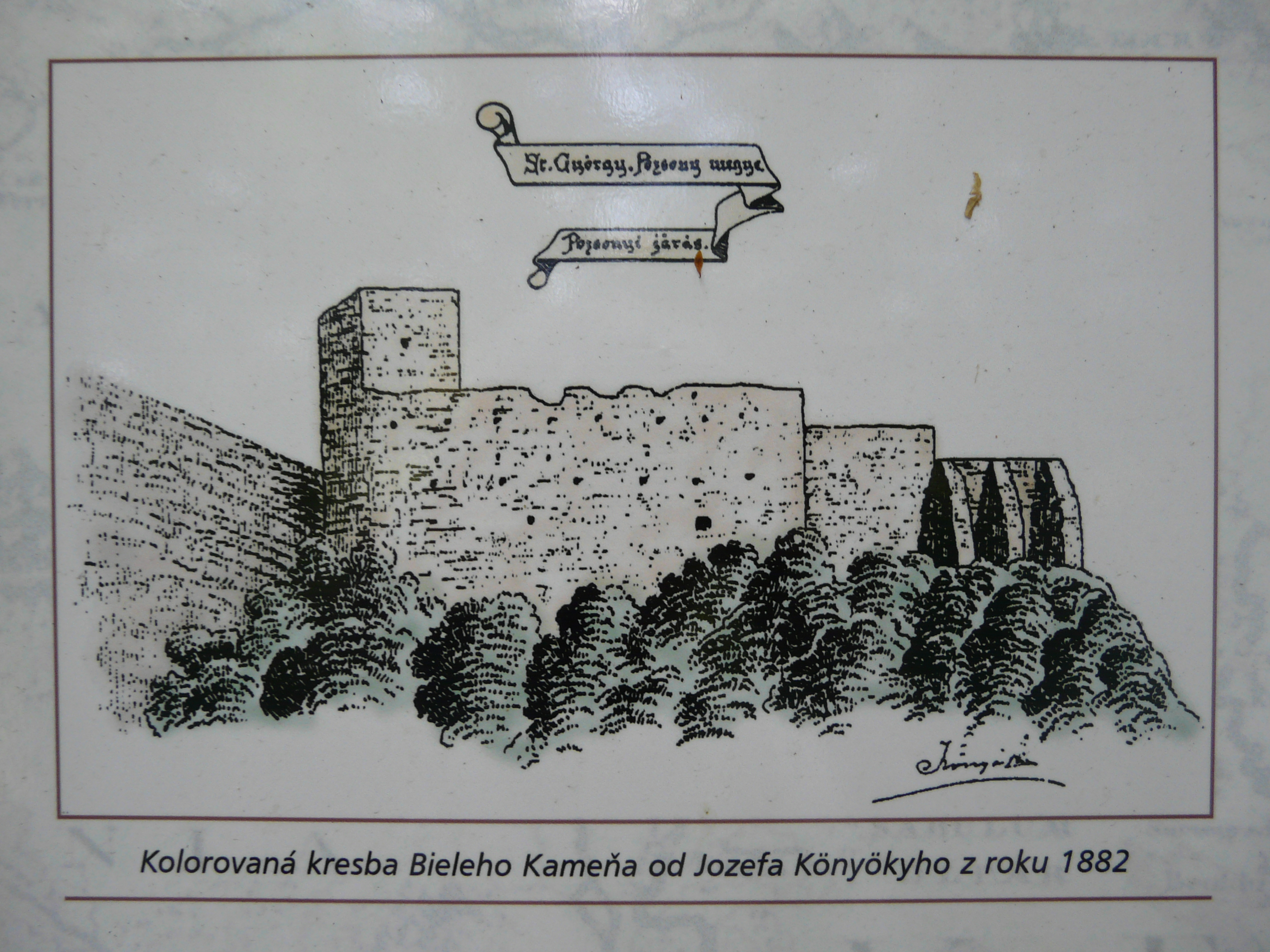
Drawing of Biely Kameň castle from 1882

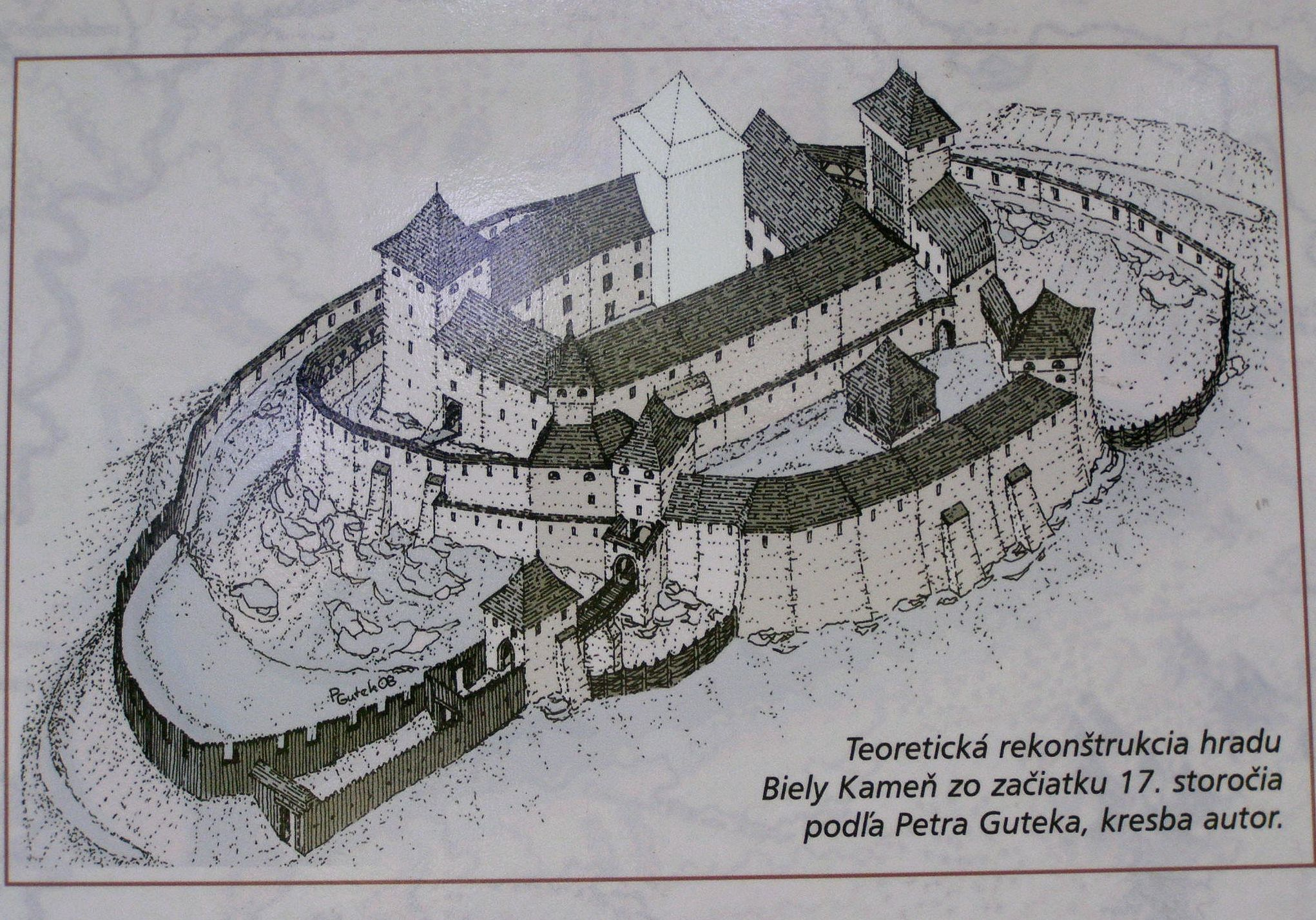
Likely look of the castle in the 17th century

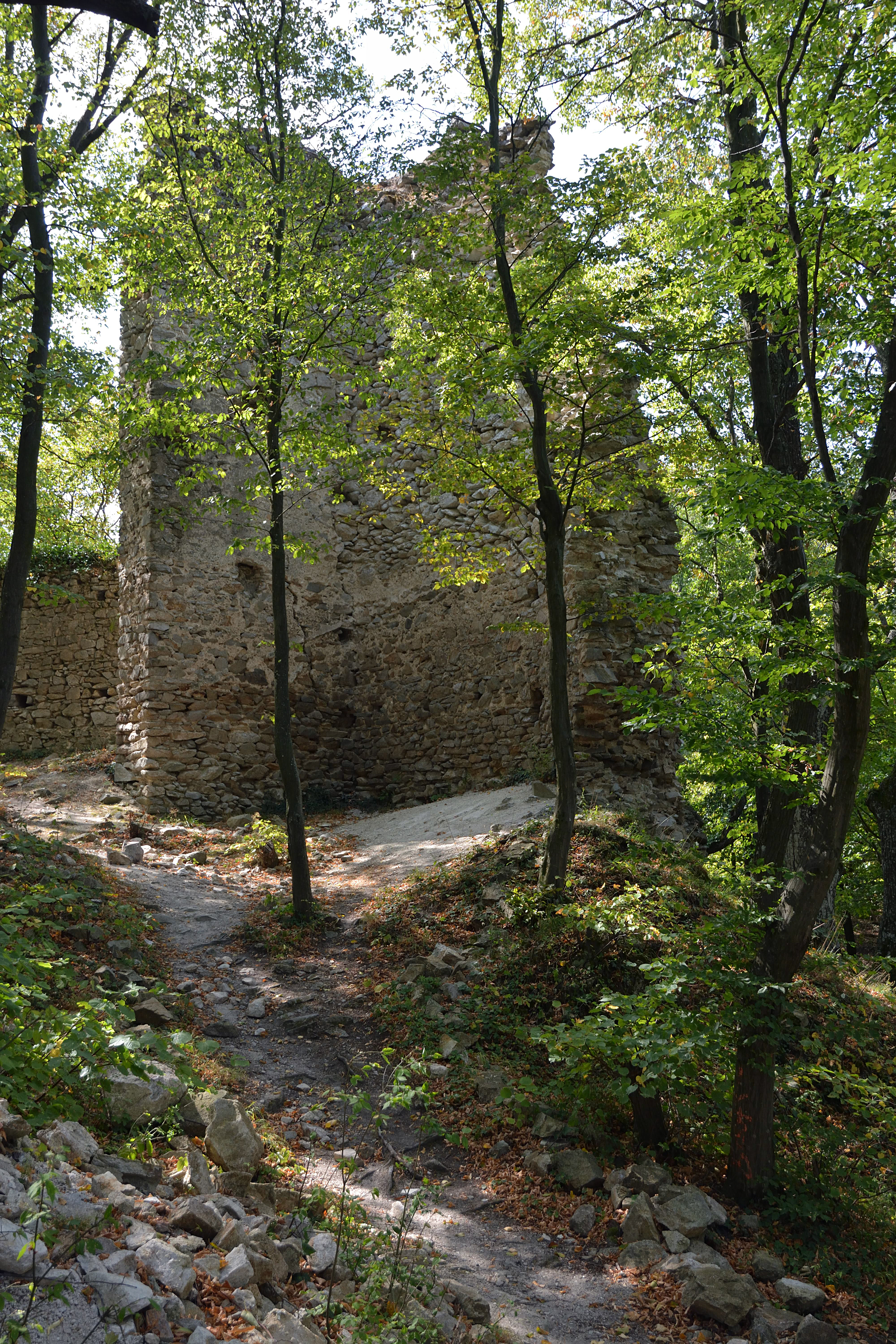
Remains of a tower

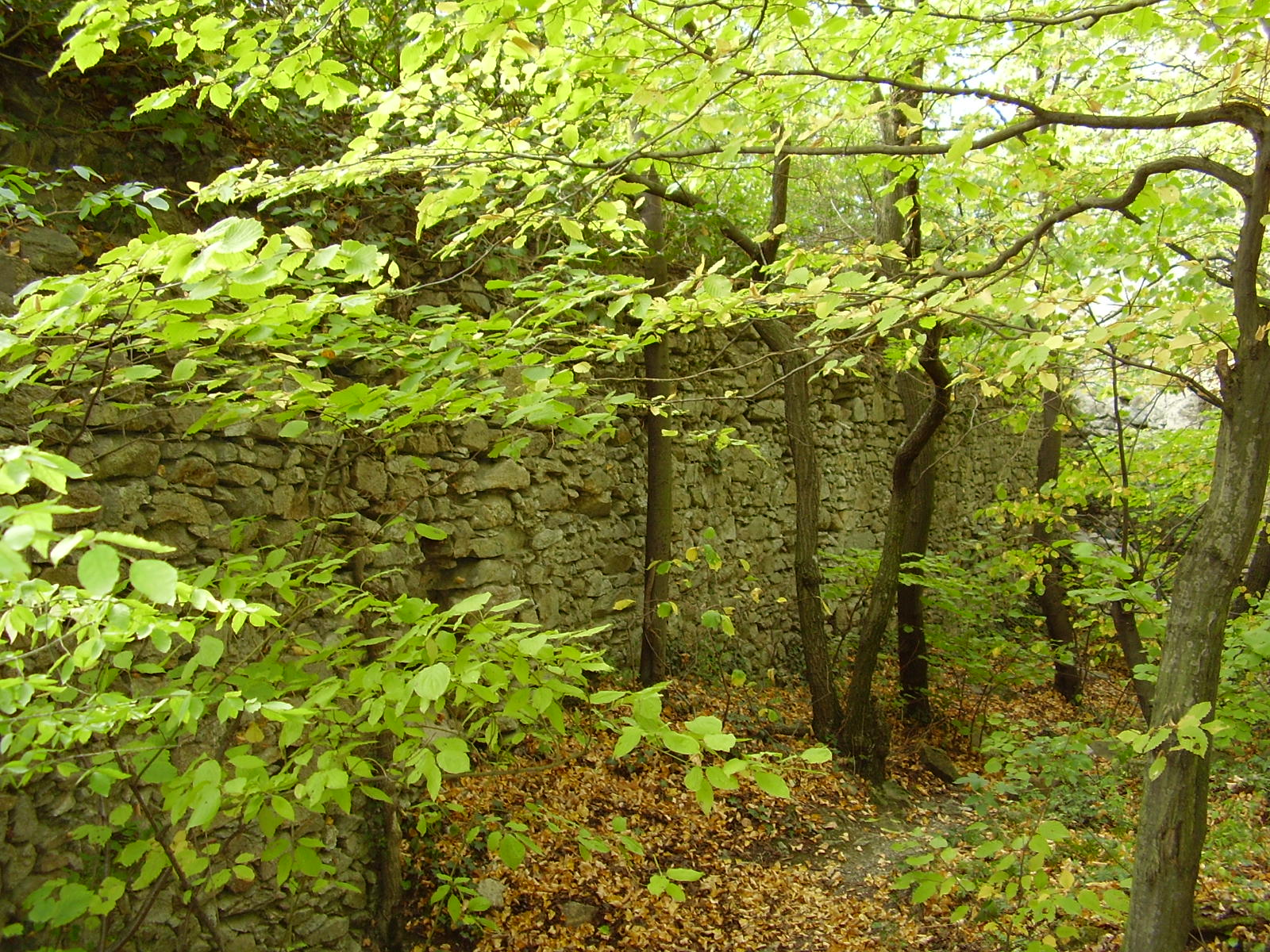
The castle ruins are largely immersed in vegetation

== See also ==
- Svätý Jur
- Pezinok
- Pajštún Castle
- Čeklís Castle
- List of castles in Slovakia
