= Čeklís Castle =

- Bernolákovo in Slovakia
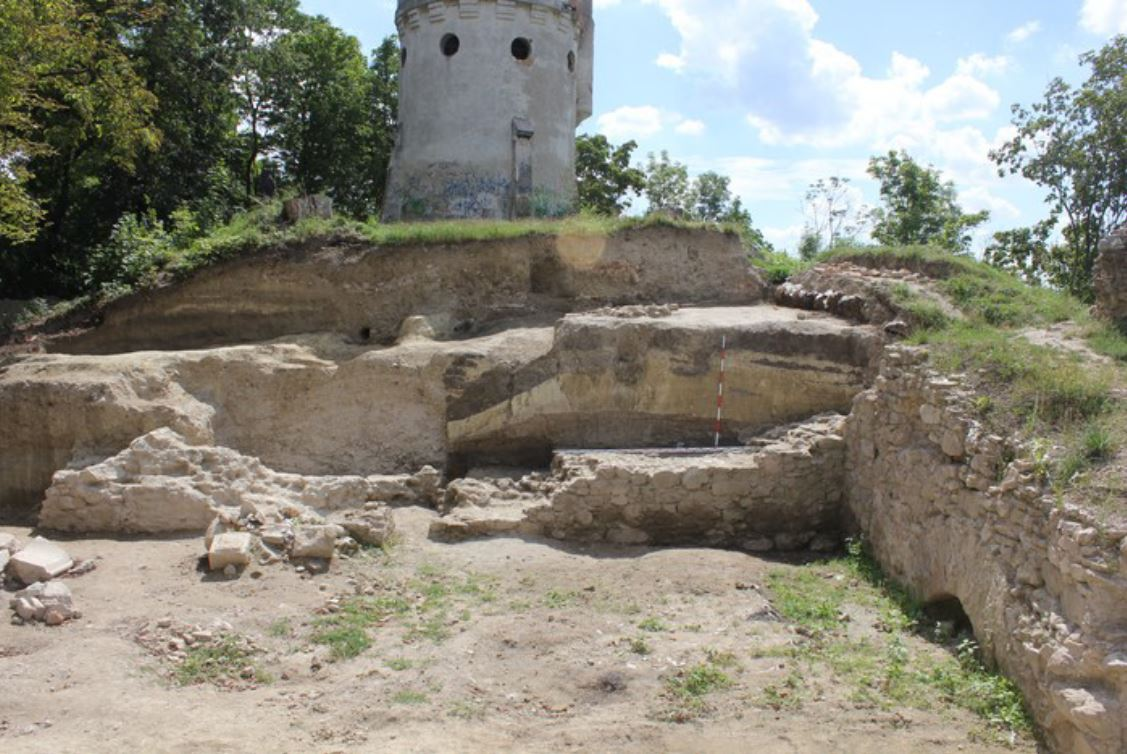
- Ruins of medieval Čeklís Castle. Early 20th century water tower in the background

Site information
- Type: Castle ruins
- Open to the public: Yes
- Condition: Ruined

Location
- Čeklís Castle (Slovakia)
- Location in Slovakia
- Coordinates: 48.199953°N 17.288022°E

Site history
- Built: 13th century

Čeklís Castle was a medieval fortification near Bernolákovo in the Bratislava region, Slovakia.

The castle was most likely built in the 13th century. It was destroyed and abandoned in the 16th century. Nowadays only a part of the perimeter wall, about 32 m long and situated on the edge of the ridge, has been preserved from the castle above ground level. A water tower was built on top of the castle remains in 1905. The tower was styled to fit the historical environment but is materially completely separate from the Čeklís Castle.

== History ==
The origins of the Čeklís Castle are not very well known. It was probably built in the 13th century and served as a guard castle of a road leading from Bratislava to the east. According to some sources, it was first mentioned in 1209 as an old settlement that Andrew II of Hungary donated to an administrator of the royal cellars by the name of Šebeš. Some documents from 1290 hint towards Pavol, son of Count Kozma of Pezinok, as the owner of the castle. Other sources date the first written mention of the castle to 1323.

At the beginning of the 14th century, the Čeklís Castle was owned by a local castellan Abraham Rufus. Rufus was at some point forced to sell his property to Matthew III Csák, after whose death the castle belonged to king Charles I of Hungary who returned it to its original owner in exchange for a strategically more important estate. Around 1351, Abraham's grandson, Nicholas of Čeklís convinced Louis I of Hungary to allow his property to be inherited by daughters as well as sons, as he had only daughters with his wife. After the death of Nicholas and his wife, the castle was in the possession of sisters Margita, Anna and Angela. In 1393, the Čeklís Castle became the property of Karol Krbavský, but following disputes it was obtained by Sigismund of Luxembourg. Ownership of the site changed hands frequently in the 15th century and the castle fell into disrepair. A written source from 1511 mentions the castle only as ruins and another source from 1523 considered it "demolished".

== Description ==
The castle was originally built on an important, strategic place but in a poor defensive position, on the edge of an undulated terrain higher. The natural terrain only protected the fortification from the south-western side. The castle's safety, apart from the walls, was reinforced by the moats around its perimeter. Today, the only visible one is the moat that divides the castle from the nearby church area. Archaeological excavations suggest that the site may have been connected to Biely Kameň by an underground tunnel.

The fortification was built of quarry stone, laid on mortar. The wall thickness reaches 190 cm. A 5 m wide relief arch is visible in the wall, barrel-vaulted and exposed to a height of 140 cm above the current terrain. In the western part of the layout, there is a part of the corner above ground level. The thickness of the masonry is 200 cm and consists of stone and bricks, joined by hard lime mortar of unsorted river sand.

== See also ==
- Pajštún Castle
- List of castles in Slovakia
