= Pajštún Castle =

- Borinka, Slovakia
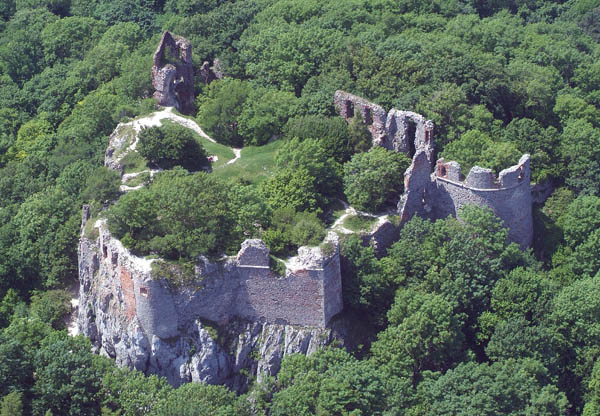
- View of the castle ruins.

Site information
- Condition: Ruined

Location
- Location in Slovakia
- Coordinates: 48.275439°N 17.082826°E

Site history
- Built: 13th century
- Materials: Limestone
- Demolished: 19th century

Pajštún Castle or Pajštún (Slovak: Pajštúnsky hrad, Hungarian: Pozsonyborostyánkő, German: Peilenstein) is a ruined medieval castle in the municipality of Borinka in the Bratislava region of Slovakia. It is located on the western edge of the Little Carpathians at an altitude of 486 m. Because of its proximity to Bratislava, the castle is a popular hiking destination for the city's inhabitants.

== History ==
The exact origins of the Pajštún castle are unclear with some historians considering it to be the same castle as the Stupava castle. The castle is standing above Stupava but is not included in the administrative territory of this town. Other historians situate the origins of the castle in the last third 13th century with Rugerius of Tallesbrunn giving the order to build it. Pajštún was a part of a regional castle system aimed at defending the north-western border of the Kingdom of Hungary. The original name of the castle was probably the German Peilenstein. The current Slovak name, Pajštún, is likely a corrupted version of the original German word. One of the first known records mentioning the castle (or the village below) comes from 1314 in connection to its owner, Otto from Telesprun. Many sources often, mistakenly, date the first mention of the castle to 1273. The castle must have existed before 1390, when it was donated by Sigismund of Luxemburg as a hereditary property to Peter Szentgyörgyi. After this family died out in 1543, the castle was owned by Gáspár Serédy.

Around 1550 the ownership of the castle was given to Eck Salm, a faithful servant of king Ferdinand I and the head of the Pozsony County. In 1592, with the consent of emperor Rudolf II, the pawned castle was paid of to the family Slam by Miklós Pálffy. Three years after his death in 1600, his widow, Mária Fugger, and his three sons received the royal donation of Pajštún castle. When the family property was divided in 1619, the Pajštún castle went to Pál Pálffy. As the condition of the castle had been progressively worsening, and with the looming Turkish danger at the time, Pálffy had the castle rebuilt between 1640 and 1645. He entrusted the most important Italian artists and builders available in the Habsburg monarchy with the reconstruction of the castle. The Italian engineer Filiberto Luchese led the renovation which fundamentally transformed the original 13th-century core of the castle. Approximately at the same time the manor house of Stupava was rebuilt as well. After the completion of this building the administration of the estate was gradually moved there. The owners of the castle soon started preferring other locations of greater convenience and Pajštún's significance and condition began to decline.

This was aggravated by a large fire after Pajštún was hit by lightning in the mid-18th century which destroyed a large part of the castle. With its importance diminished, the repairs were merely provisional. The castle though was still inhabitable in the mid-18th century. During the Napoleonic Wars the French troops occupied Bratislava and its environments. Although castles like Pajštún lost their strategic role in the 19th century, the French troops blew up the castle in June 1809 during the campaign against Vienna. The last owner of the castle, Lajos Károlyi, abandoned his properties including the ruins of the Pajštún castle along with other nearby mansions and possessions in 1945.

== Architecture ==
From the original medieval castle that stood on the top platform only some parts of the walls above the eastern precipice survive. The half-circle cannon bastion in the northern part of the fortification dates back to the 16th century rebuilding of the Pajštún castle. Located close to this cannon bastion, is a preserved armed corner of the castle gate. Most probably behind this gate the palace itself was located. The basement of the palace was incorporated in the rock on which the castle was built. During the Pálffy rule of the castle the entire castle was further altered. On the western side of the top plateau, the castle was closed by a palace with a forecastle which was in turn fortified with a series of bastions, artillery positions and a tapered cannon bastion. A two-floored tall entry building with an arched gate provided access to the forecastle. From the outside it was dissected by a trio of oriels supported by consoles and ornamented by early baroque masks. The remains of an arched underground cistern with a brick mantle on the upper platform of the castle also date back to this time period. The fragmented pieces of wall on the southern side are the only surviving parts of the southern palace that stood on top of this rock.

== See also ==
- List of castles in Slovakia
