= 1556 =

1556 in various calendars
- Gregorian calendar: 1556; MDLVI
- Ab urbe condita: 2309
- Armenian calendar: 1005; ԹՎ ՌԵ
- Assyrian calendar: 6306
- Balinese saka calendar: 1477–1478
- Bengali calendar: 962–963
- Berber calendar: 2506
- English Regnal year: 2 Ph. & M. – 3 Ph. & M.
- Buddhist calendar: 2100
- Burmese calendar: 918
- Byzantine calendar: 7064–7065
- Chinese calendar: 乙卯年 (Wood Rabbit); 4253 or 4046 — to — 丙辰年 (Fire Dragon); 4254 or 4047
- Coptic calendar: 1272–1273
- Discordian calendar: 2722
- Ethiopian calendar: 1548–1549
- Hebrew calendar: 5316–5317
- Hindu calendars
- Vikram Samvat: 1612–1613
- Shaka Samvat: 1477–1478
- Kali Yuga: 4656–4657
- Holocene calendar: 11556
- Igbo calendar: 556–557
- Iranian calendar: 934–935
- Islamic calendar: 963–964
- Japanese calendar: Kōji 2 (弘治２年)
- Javanese calendar: 1475–1476
- Julian calendar: 1556; MDLVI
- Korean calendar: 3889
- Minguo calendar: 356 before ROC 民前356年
- Nanakshahi calendar: 88
- Thai solar calendar: 2098–2099
- Tibetan calendar: ཤིང་མོ་ཡོས་ལོ་ (female Wood-Hare); 1682 or 1301 or 529 — to — མེ་ཕོ་འབྲུག་ལོ་ (male Fire-Dragon); 1683 or 1302 or 530

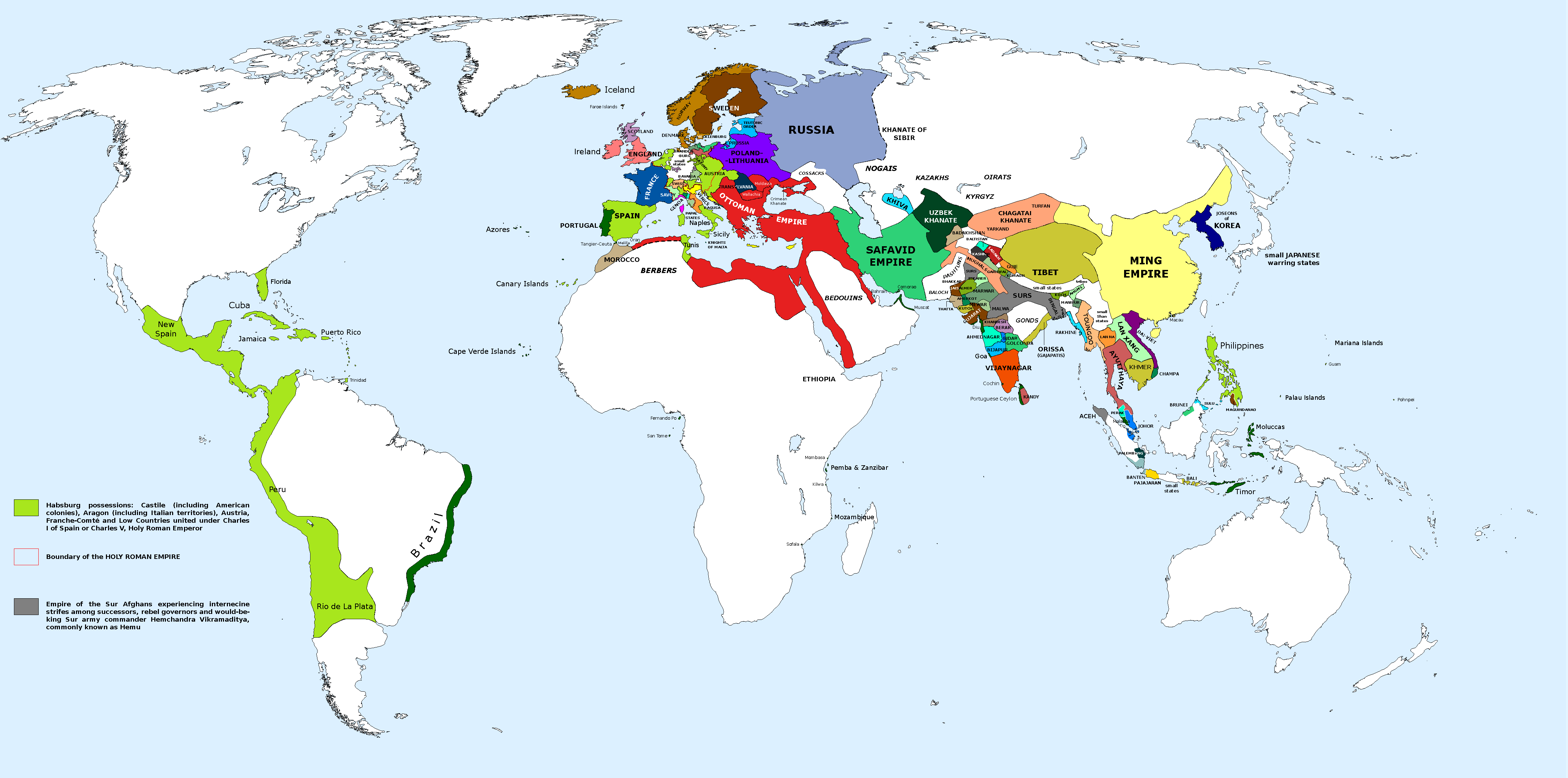
The world in 1556

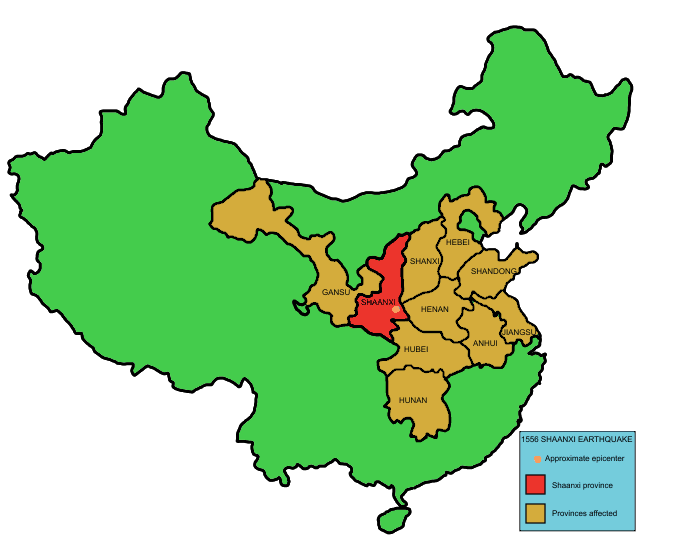
January 23: Shaanxi earthquake, devastation kills 830,000 people in China.

Year 1556 (MDLVI) was a leap year starting on Wednesday of the Julian calendar.

== Events ==
=== January–March ===
- January 4 – In Japan, Saitō Yoshitatsu, the eldest son of Saitō Dōsan, arranges the murders of his two younger brothers, Magoshiro and Kiheiji, and forces his father to flee from the Sagiyama Castle.
- January 16 – Charles V abdicates the thrones of the Spanish Empire (including his colonies in the New World) in favor of his son, Philip II, and retires to a monastery.
- January 23 – The Shaanxi earthquake, the deadliest earthquake in history, occurs with its epicenter in Shaanxi province, China; 830,000 people may have been killed.
- January 24 – In India, at the Sher Mandal in Delhi, the Mughal Emperor Humayun trips while descending the stairs from his library and strikes the side of his head against a stone step, sustaining a fatal injury. He never regains consciousness and dies seven days later.
- February 5 – Truce of Vaucelles: Fighting temporarily ends between France and Spain.
- February 14 – Akbar the Great ascends the throne of the Mughal Empire in India at age 13; he will rule until his death in 1605, by which time most of the north and centre of the Indian subcontinent will be under his control.
- March 21 – In Oxford, Thomas Cranmer, the former Archbishop of Canterbury, is burned at the stake for treason for his role in the English Reformation as chief bishop of the Anglican Church.
- March 22 – Reginald Pole, a Roman Catholic Cardinal, is appointed by Queen Mary of England as the new Archbishop of Canterbury and head of the Catholic Archdiocese of Canterbury.

=== April–June ===
- April 3 – In Qazvin, the Shah of Iran Tahmasp I, becomes enraged with the sexual orientation of his son Ismail II, and sends Ismail to Afghanistan to serve as the Iranian governor of Herat province.
- April 24 – Pál Márkházy surrenders the Hungarian fortress at Ajnácskő (now Hajnáčka in Slovakia) to the Ottoman Empire. Márkházy, accused of treachery, is stripped of his estates and title by the King of Hungary, and forced to flee to the Principality of Transylvania.
- May 28 (20th day of 4th month of Kōji 2) – In Japan, the Battle of Nagara-gawa takes place along the Nagara River in Mino Province near what is now the Gifu Prefecture. Saitō Yoshitatsu, with 17,500 troops, overwhelms and kills his father, Saitō Dōsan, who had attempted to avenge the Saitō family honor with less than 3,000 people.
- June 14 – Lorenzo Priuli becomes the new Doge of the Venetian Republic.
- June 27 – Thirteen English Protestants (11 men and two women), the "Stratford Martyrs", are burned at the stake at Stratford-le-Bow near London after being convicted of heresy.

=== July–September ===
- July 17 – Kostajnica Fortress in what is now Croatia falls to the Ottoman Empire and remains under Turkish control for the next 132 years.
- August 15 – Work begins on the Peresopnytsia Gospel at the Monastery of the Holy Trinity in the Grand Duchy of Lithuania, and continues for the next five years.
- August 27 – Charles V abdicates his position as Holy Roman Emperor in favor of his younger brother, Ferdinand, King of the Romans. The Imperial Diet postpones recognizing the abdication for the next 18 months.
- September 1 – After Pope Paul IV attempts to get King Henry II of France to join him in an invasion of Spanish-controlled Naples, Spain's Duke of Alba invades the Papal States in Italy.

=== October–December ===
- October 7 – The Battle of Delhi is fought in India, at Tughlaqabad) near Delhi between forces of the Sur Empire (ruled by Muhammad Adil Shah) and the Mughal Empire (ruled by Akbar the Great). General Hemchandra Vikramaditya (Hemu) of the Suris overwhelms the forces commanded by the Mughal Governor of Delhi, Tardi Beg Khan within one day.
- November 5 – Second Battle of Panipat: Fifty miles north of Delhi, a Mughal army defeats the forces of Hemu and recaptures Delhi for the Mughal Empire, guaranteeing Akbar's rule.
- November 10 – The English ship Edward Bonadventure, commanded by Richard Chancellor is wrecked on the coast of Scotland at Pitsligo, killing most of its crew, including Chancellor. The few survivors include the first Russian ambassador to England, Osip Nepeya.
- November 17 – In the Holy Roman Empire, the Steter Kriegsrat is founded as a War Council with five generals and five civil servants to advise the Habsburg rulers.
- December 7 – The Mughal Emperor Akbar personally travels with Bairam Khan to lead an invasion force to defeat the Sultan of the Sur Empire, Sikandar Shah Suri.
- December 27 – Péter Erdődy is appointed as the Ottoman Viceroy of Croatia after the death on September 7 of Nikola IV Zrinski.
- December 31 – All military authorities in the Holy Roman Empire are ordered to submit to the decisions of the Imperial War Council.

=== Date unknown ===
- The kings of Spain take control of what becomes the Flanders region, including the French département of Nord.
- The Plantations of Ireland are started in King's County (later County Offaly) and Queen's County (later County Laois), the earliest attempt at systematic ethnic cleansing in Ireland, by the Roman Catholic ruler Queen Mary I of England.
- Future King Prince John, younger son of King Gustav I of Sweden becomes Duke of Finland.
- Ivan the Terrible conquers Astrakhan, opening the Volga River to Russian traffic and trade.
- The Welser banking families of Augsburg lose colonial control of Venezuela.
- The false Martin Guerre appears in the French village of Artigat.
- The first printing press in India is introduced by Jesuits, at Saint Paul's College, Goa.

== Births ==
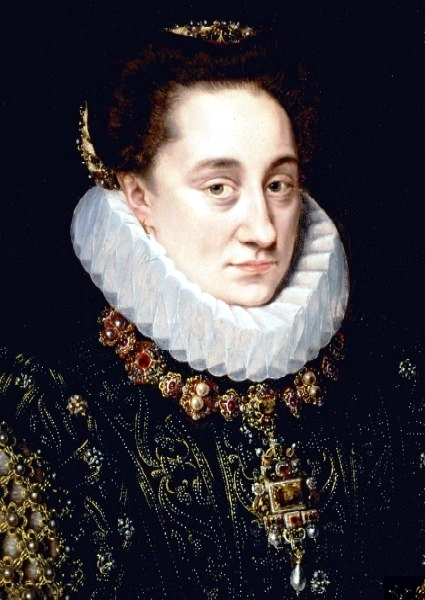
Countess Maria of Nassau

- January 8 – Uesugi Kagekatsu, Japanese samurai and warlord (d. 1623)
- January 24 – Christian Barnekow, Danish noble, explorer and diplomat (d. 1612)
- February 4 – Dorothea of Hanau-Münzenberg, German noblewoman (d. 1638)
- February 7 – Countess Maria of Nassau (d. 1616)
- February 16 – Tōdō Takatora, Japanese daimyō (d. 1630)
- February 21 – Sethus Calvisius, German calendar reformer (d. 1615)
- March 7 – Guillaume du Vair, French statesman and philosopher (d. 1621)
- March 13 – Dirck van Os, Dutch merchant (d. 1615)
- April 8 – David Hoeschel, German librarian (d. 1617)
- April 9 – Andreas von Auersperg, Carniolan noble and military commander in the battle of Sisak (d. 1593)
- April 27 – François Béroalde de Verville, French writer (d. 1626)
- May 31 – Jerzy Radziwiłł, Polish Catholic cardinal (d. 1600)
- June 6 – Edward la Zouche, 11th Baron Zouche, English politician and diplomat (d. 1625)
- June 13 – Pomponio Nenna, Italian composer (d. 1608)
- June 24
  - Victoria of Valois, French princess (d. 1556)
  - Joan of Valois, French princess (d. 1556)
- July 9 – Elizabeth Finch, 1st Countess of Winchilsea, English countess (d. 1634)
- July 22 – Otto Henry, Count Palatine of Sulzbach (d. 1604)
- July 26 – James Melville, Scottish divine and reformer (d. 1614)
- August 10 – Philipp Nicolai, German Lutheran pastor (d. 1608)
- August 16 – Bartolomeo Cesi, Italian painter (d. 1629)
- September 21 – William Harris, English knight (d. 1616)
- October 18
  - Charles I, Duke of Elbeuf, French duke and nobleman (d. 1605)
  - John Dormer, English Member of Parliament (d. 1626)
- October 24 – Giovanni Battista Caccini, Italian artist (d. 1613)
- October 26 – Ahmad Baba al Massufi, Malian academic (d. 1627)
- November 25 – Jacques Davy Duperron, French cardinal (d. 1618)
- November 28 – Francesco Contarini, Doge of Venice (d. 1624)
- December 5 – Anne Cecil, Countess of Oxford, English countess (d. 1588)
- December 17 – Abdul Rahim Khan-I-Khana, Indian composer (d. 1627)
- December 27 – Jeanne de Lestonnac, French saint (d. 1640)
- date unknown
  - Margaret Clitherow, English Catholic martyr (d. 1586)
  - Ahmad Baba al Massufi, Sudanese writer and political leader (d. 1627)
  - Alexander Briant, English Jesuit martyr (d. 1581)

== Deaths ==
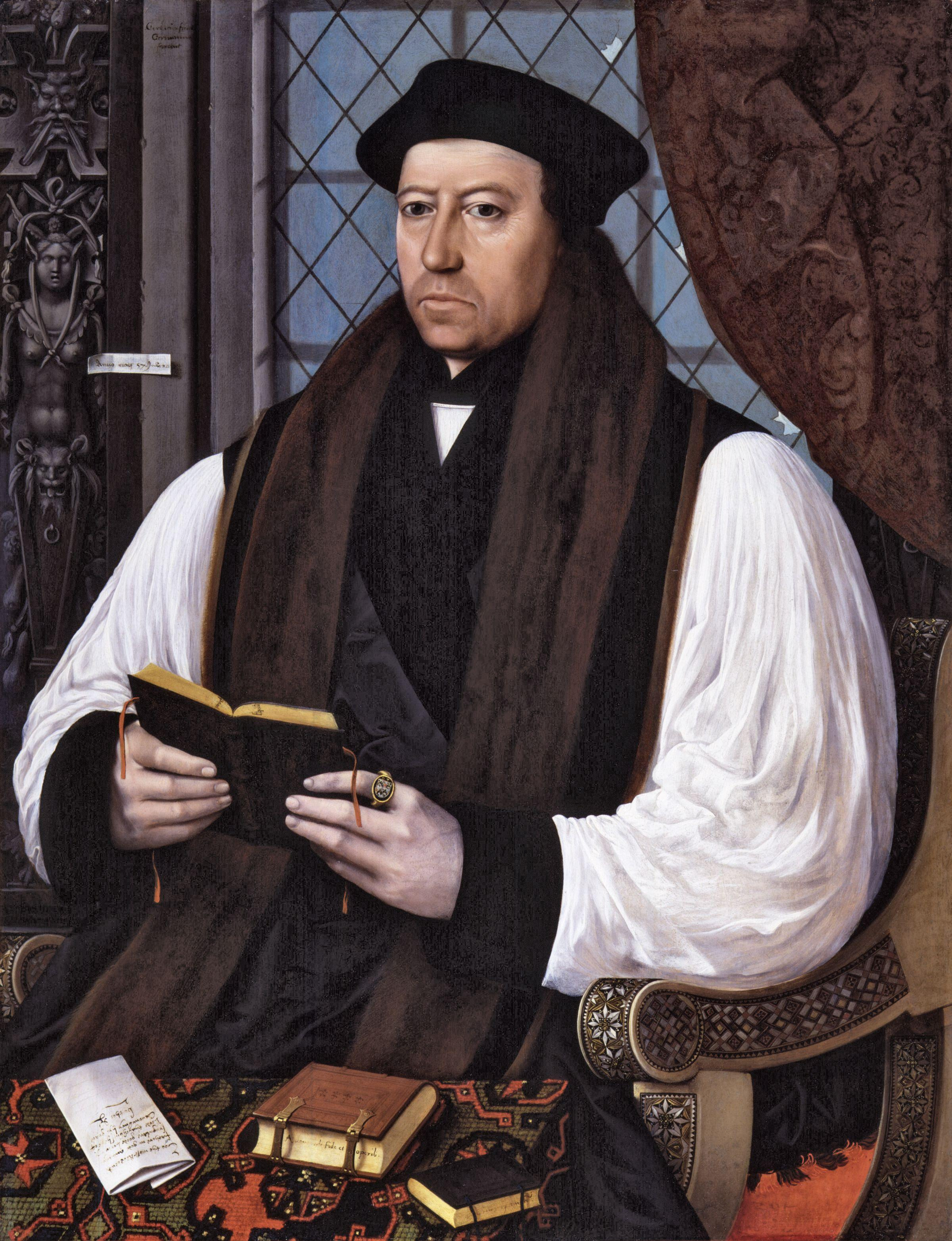
Thomas Cranmer

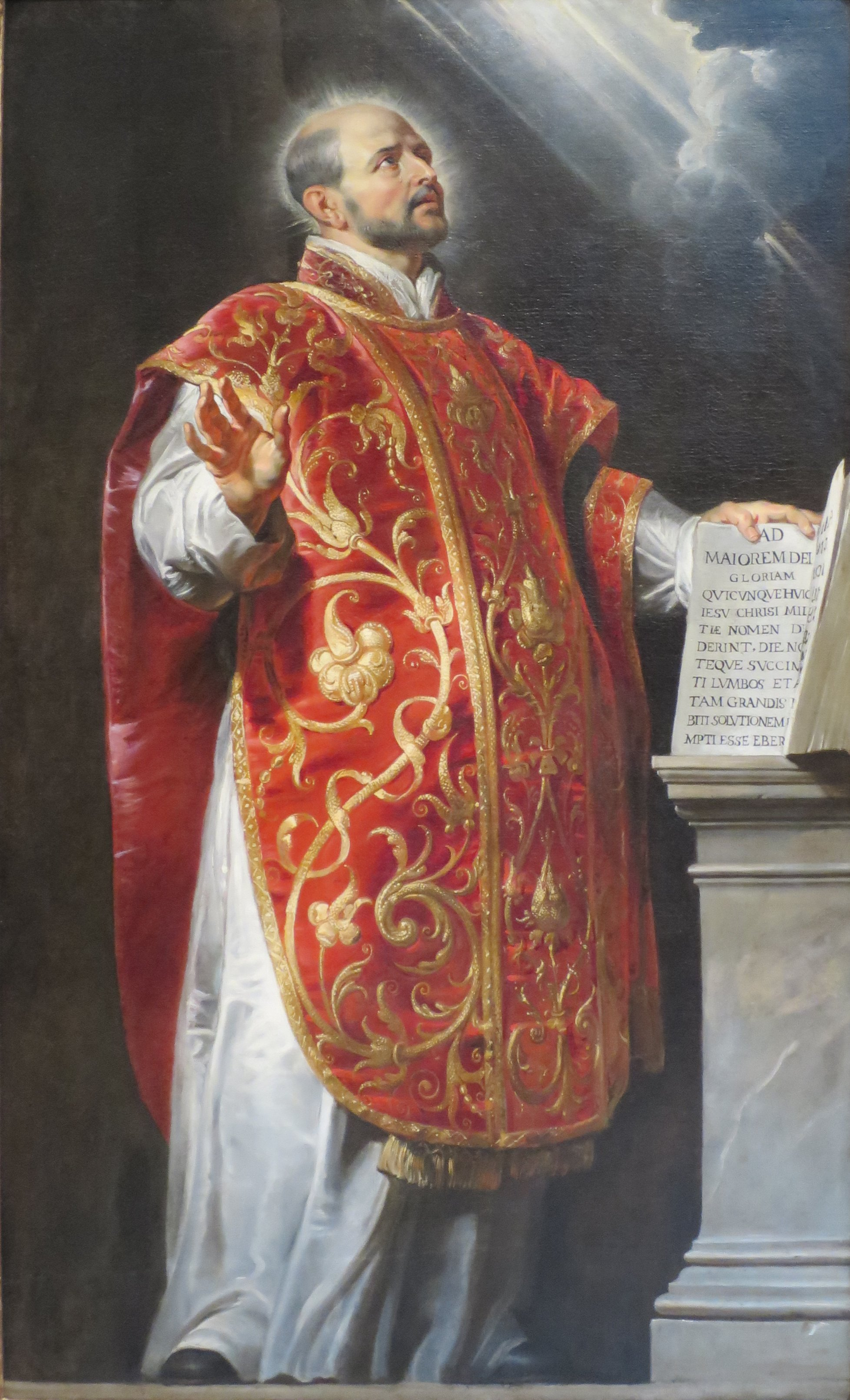
Saint Ignatius of Loyola

- January 8 – Anne Shelton, English courtier, elder sister of Thomas Boleyn (b. 1475)
- January 27 – Humayun, 2nd Mughal Emperor (b. 1508)
- February 12 – Giovanni Poggio, Italian cardinal and diplomat (b. 1493)
- February 26 – Frederick II, Elector Palatine (1544–1556) (b. 1482)
- March 21 – Thomas Cranmer, Archbishop of Canterbury (burned at the stake) (b. 1489)
- April 18
  - Luigi Alamanni, Italian poet and statesman (b. 1495)
  - John Gage, English courtier of the Tudor period (b. 1479)
- April 26 – Valentin Friedland, German scholar and educationist of the Reformation (b. 1490)
- May 4 – Luca Ghini, Italian physician and botanist (b. 1490)
- May 28 – Saitō Dōsan, Japanese warlord (b. 1494)
- June 10 – Martin Agricola, German composer (b. 1486)
- June 24 – Joan of Valois, French princess (b. 1556)
- July 31 – Ignatius of Loyola, Spanish founder of the Jesuit order and saint (b. 1491)
- August 1 – Girolamo da Carpi, Italian painter (b. 1501)
- August 11 – John Bell, Bishop of Worcester
- August 17 – Victoria of Valois, French princess (b. 1556)
- September – Patrick Hepburn, 3rd Earl of Bothwell, Scottish traitor (b. 1512)
- October 7 – Frederick of Denmark, Prince-bishop (b. 1532)
- October 21 – Pietro Aretino, Italian author (b. 1492)
- November 10 – Richard Chancellor, English Arctic explorer (drowned at sea) (b. c. 1521)
- November 14 – Giovanni della Casa, Italian poet (b. 1503)
- date unknown
  - Tullia d'Aragona, Italian poet, author and philosopher (b. 1510)
  - Fuzûlî, Turkish poet (b. 1494)
- probable
  - Brian mac Cathaoir O Conchobhair Failghe, last of the Kings of Ui Failghe
  - Jacob Clemens non Papa, Flemish composer (b. 1510)
