= Pakra Monastery =

Serbian Orthodox monastery in Croatia

Coordinates: 45°33′13.8″N 17°20′13″E

- Манастир Пакра
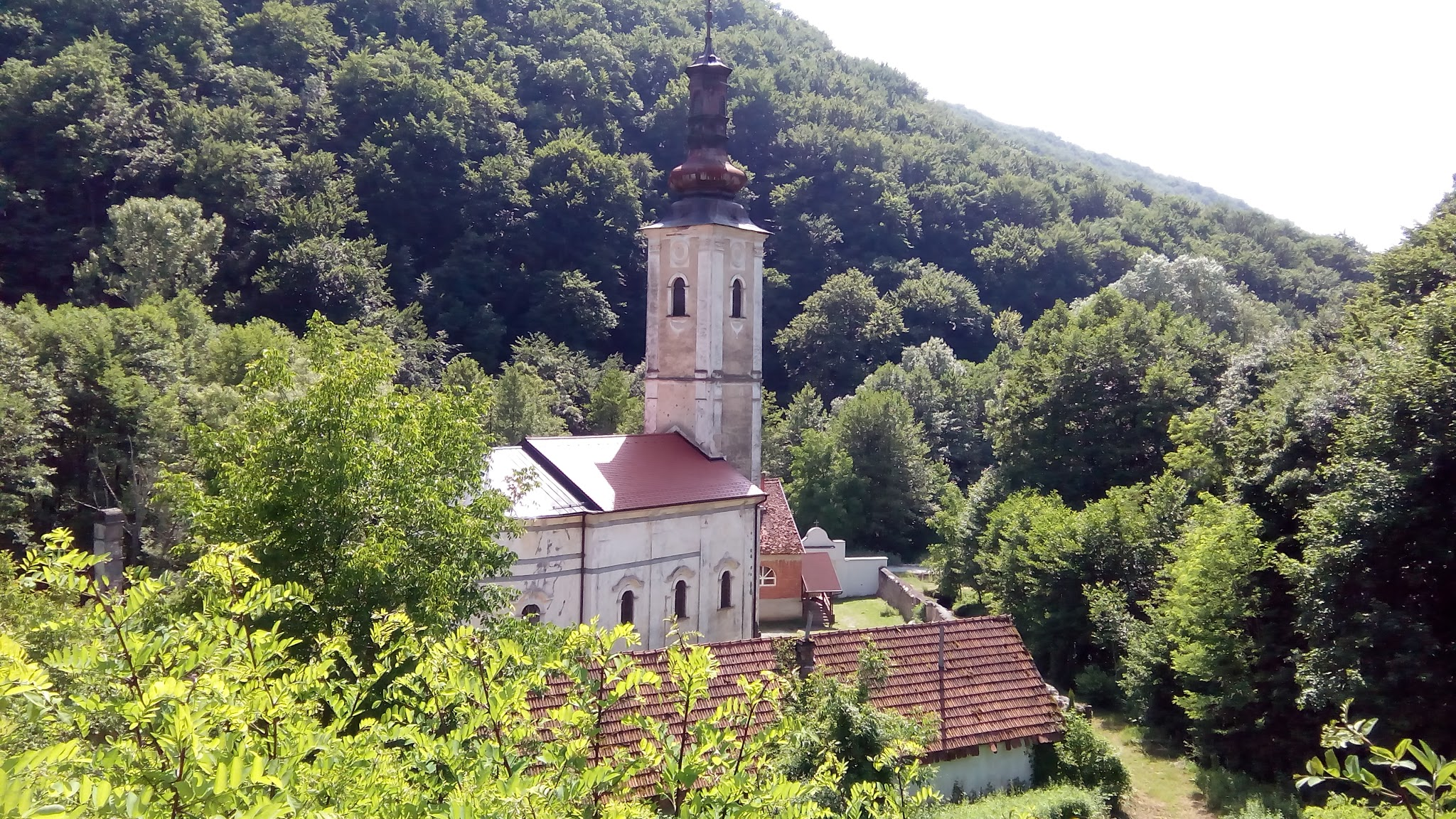
- Interactive map of Pakra Monastery

Monastery information
- Other name: Nova Pustinja
- Order: Serbian Orthodox
- Established: 15th century or 16th century (first mention)
- Diocese: Eparchy of Pakrac and Slavonia

Site
- Location: Donji Borki
- Country: Croatia

The Pakra Monastery (Serbian: Манастир Пакра, romanized: Manastir Pakra) is a Serbian Orthodox monastery of the Eparchy of Pakrac and Slavonia, located in central Slavonia, in the municipality of Sirač, Croatia. The monastery is currently in poor condition and uninhabited. According to historical sources, the monastery was also known as Nova Pustinja (New Desert).

== Location and jurisdiction ==
The Pakra Monastery is located in the area of the village of Donji Borki, between the Slavonian towns of Daruvar and Pakrac, the historical seat of the Slavonian diocese. The monastery is situated along the Bijela, a tributary of the Pakra river, after which the monastery was named. The area around the monastery belongs to the mountainous part of Slavonia (Papuk mountain), known as Zabrđe. Until the Croatian War of Independence, the surrounding villages were primarily populated by Serbs.

The Eparchy of Pakrac and Slavonia, to which the Pakra Monastery belongs, has maintained an unbroken line of Orthodox bishops since 1704. It has held spiritual jurisdiction over the Orthodox population of Slavonia and northern Croatia for over three centuries. Defined in the 18th century as a diocese within the Metropolitanate of Karlovci, it later became part of the restored Serbian Patriarchate in the 20th century.

== History ==
Serbian populations began settling the mountainous regions of Slavonia in the 15th century, migrating due to the expansion of the Ottoman Empire. This migration increased significantly in the 16th century following the Ottoman conquest of Slavonia. The region had been largely depopulated after the previous Roman Catholic inhabitants migrated to Burgenland (ancestors of the Burgenland Croats).

The oldest written record of the monastery dates to 1556, mentioning an Abbot Teodosije. According to local tradition, the monastery was founded by a hermit named Stamenko Njigomir, who took the monastic name Jovan. He and other monks built wooden cells that eventually became the Pakra Monastery. The monastery was abandoned during Ottoman rule in Slavonia but was restored in 1697 by the Metropolitan of Morava, Grigorije, along with monks from the Mileševa Monastery.

In 1717, monk Teodor Mileševac traveled to Russia to collect alms, securing books and church items valued at 100 Russian rubles. The monastic community expanded its estate, which grew to over 100 acres by the mid-19th century, and began restoring the nearby abandoned monastery of St. Anne. Between 1759 and 1763, the chapel of Saint Nicholas was built in the monastery cemetery. The monastery church's iconostasis, dating from 1773, was created by icon painter Vasilije Ostojić and his assistant Lazar from Novi Sad. The woodcarving was completed in 1774 by master carver Jovan Dujković from Podborje (Daruvar).

The monastery was severely damaged on May 24, 1780, during a storm that destroyed the roofs of the church and other buildings. Restoration was delayed due to a lack of funds and was completed in 1785.

During World War I, the monastery and parish church were stripped of their bells. A thorough renovation took place in 1923, and a new residential building was constructed on the monastery's estate in Bijela.

Visarion Saraj served as a hierodeacon at the monastery for seven years.

During World War II, the monastery suffered extensive damage. The monks were expelled to Serbia by the Independent State of Croatia (NDH). Abbot Jefrem hid part of the monastery's antiquities, while others were transferred to Zagreb. In 1943, the Ustaše Militia burned the monastic cells and destroyed the church. The buried items were later recovered by the Yugoslav Partisans. Among the surviving artifacts is the Mileševa Shroud, a 1567 gift from Moldavian Voivode Alexandru Lăpușneanu and his wife Ruxandra, which is now preserved in the Museum of the Serbian Orthodox Church in Zagreb.

After the war, the church was partially restored for religious services, and some cells were rebuilt to accommodate a small community of nuns.

During the Croatian War of Independence in the 1990s, the monastery was abandoned once more. In 1997, due to the deteriorating condition of the buildings, several icons were removed and stored in the depot of the Croatian Conservation Institute in Ludbreg. Remaining parts of the cemetery chapel's iconostasis were stored inside the main church. The cemetery chapel has since fallen into ruin and is heavily overgrown.

In May 2007, structural repairs were made to the church's foundation and walls, and drainage was installed. However, comprehensive restoration has not yet occurred. The monastery remains uninhabited and is maintained by the parish priest of the Daruvar Orthodox Church.

== Architecture ==
The monastery complex centers around the Church of the Presentation of the Blessed Virgin Mary, featuring a semicircular sanctuary and an attached belfry. Adjacent to it is the konak (monastery quarters), with the cemetery and its chapel located further away.

=== Church of the Presentation of the Blessed Virgin Mary ===
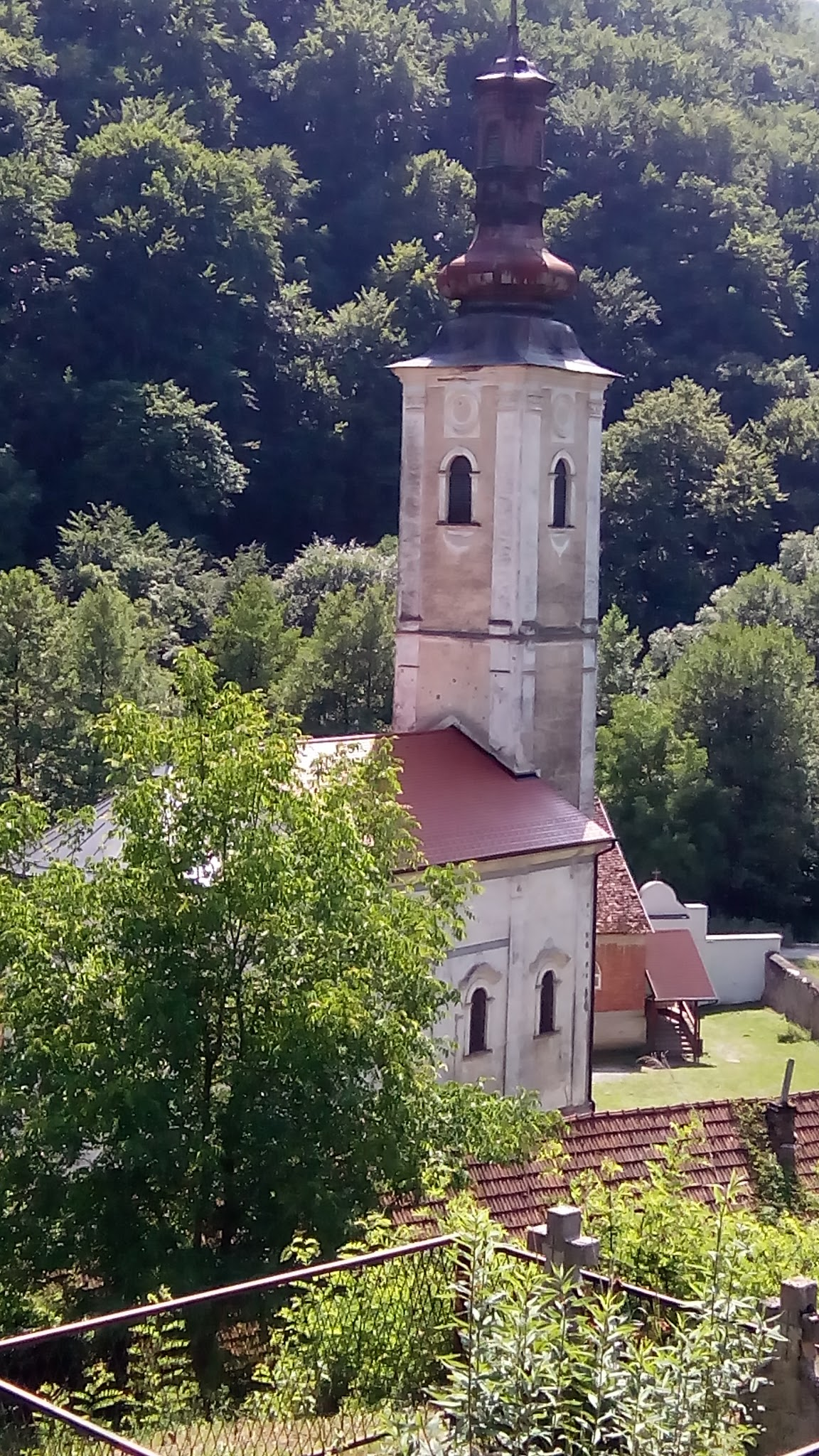
Church of the Presentation of the Blessed Virgin Mary

Completed in 1765, the Church of the Presentation is a Baroque single-nave building constructed of hewn stone and brick. In 1803, a galvanized sheet metal roof was installed. The church's roof was destroyed by storms in 1780 and 1887, exposing the interior and causing severe damage to the wooden inventory, particularly the iconostasis.

The church interior features a nearly 10-meter-high iconostasis, erected in 1779. It contains 72 icons arranged in five rows. The lowest row depicts Old Testament scenes, followed by throne icons, feast days, the Deesis, the Holy Trinity, and the Crucifixion at the top. The icons, painted in tempera, are attributed to the Novi Sad artist Vasilije Ostojić.

=== Konak ===
The monastery konak is a long, two-story building with three wings.

=== Belfry ===
A belfry was added to the western wall of the church in 1769, giving the building's base the shape of a cross.

=== Cemetery chapel ===
The cemetery chapel of Saint Nicholas was built on a slight elevation in 1761. It is a single-nave building with a semi-cylindrical vault, a semicircular sanctuary, and a crypt for burying monks. The chapel's iconostasis was completed in 1764. The chapel's location on unstable ground led to structural shifting, causing the walls to crack and the belfry and roof to collapse. Exposure to the elements subsequently led to the rapid deterioration of the chapel's frescoes and iconostasis.

== Treasury ==
=== Relics ===
Inventories from the interwar period list several notable items in the monastery's treasury:

- An old icon of the Holy Virgin, historically carried during the Great Litia.
- A wooden cross encrusted with mother-of-pearl, featuring a Greek inscription.
- The cross of Patriarch Arsenije III Čarnojević, measuring 0.44 by 0.20 meters. It was decorated with multiple icons and gemstones, including opals, turquoises, agates, and corals. The patriarchal panagia (a bishop's medallion) left by the Patriarch was historically kept in the metropolitan's palace in Pakrac.

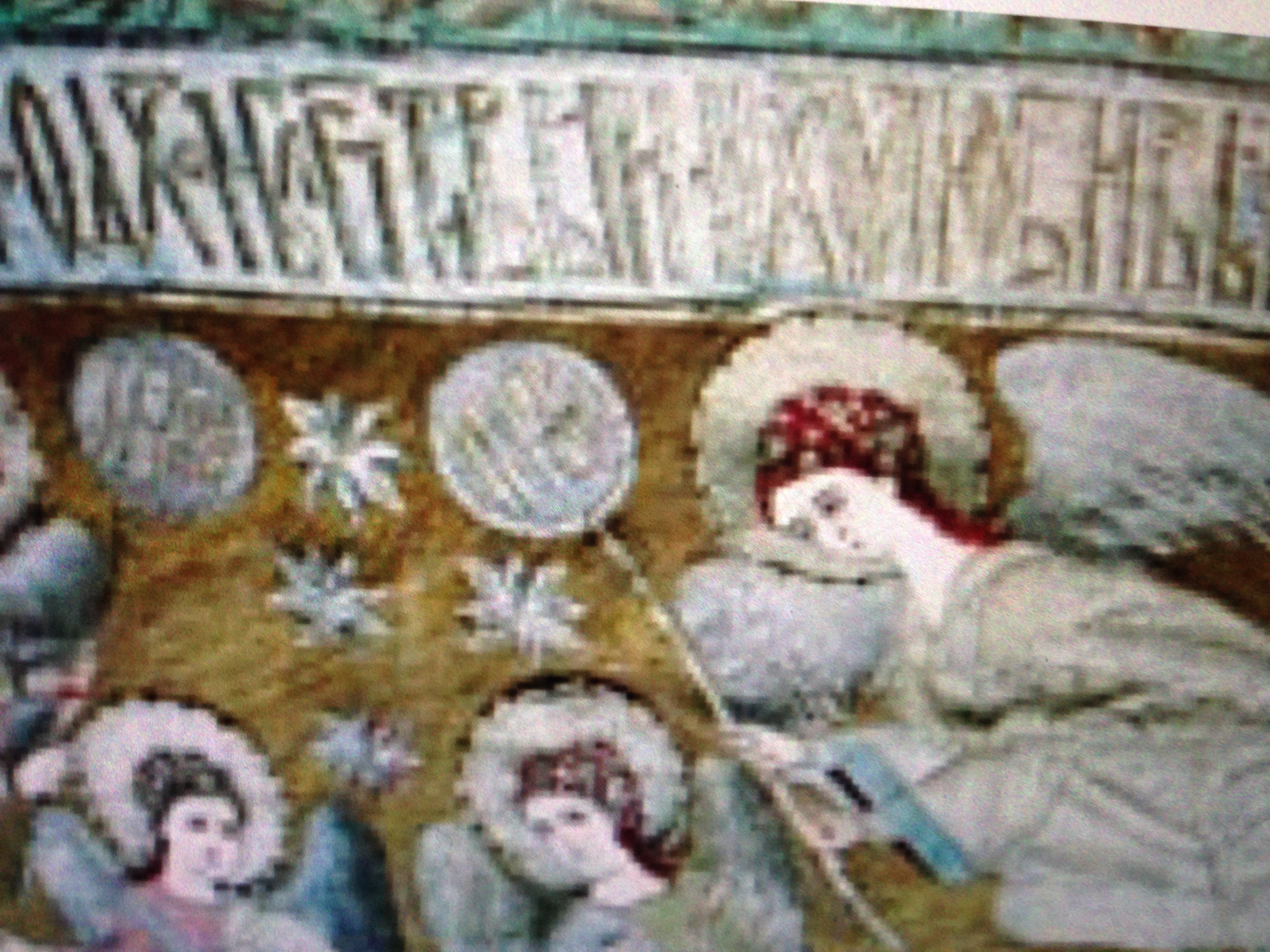
Mileševa Shroud

- Several other crosses, icons, and miniatures from the 15th and 16th centuries.
- The Mileševa Shroud, an embroidered liturgical cloth donated by Moldavian Voivode Alexandru Lăpușneanu and his wife Ruxandra on August 6, 1567. The shroud features an icon of the entombment of Christ, detailed with gold thread and gemstones. The figures depicted bear the likenesses of the Moldavian ducal family. Originally intended for the tomb of St. Sava in the Mileševa Monastery, it was relocated to Pakra due to the Ottoman threat.
- Several copperplate engravings commissioned by the monastery at the end of the 18th century, including an 1800 depiction of the Translation of the Relics of Saint Nicholas.

=== Liturgical books ===
The monastery library contained several significant liturgical books:

- Ravna Reka Gospel: A manuscript srbulja from the Ravna Reka monastery in southern Serbia, written in 1437 by Gerasim and Neša. The manuscript was bound in a gold and silver fitting in 1661.
- Russian Gospel: A large gospel book with silver covers and enamel miniatures, donated alongside other liturgical items by the Russian prince Vojta Vojnić of Kiev.

=== Return of relics ===
In December 2018, based on an agreement between Serbia and Croatia, 108 icons were returned to the Eparchy of Pakrac and Slavonia. These items, including artifacts from the Pakra Monastery, are to be housed in the new depot of the Eparchy Palace in Pakrac.

== See also ==
- List of Serbian Orthodox monasteries

== Sources ==
- Krasić, Vladimir (1886). "Manastir Pakra". Stražilovo. 2: 1633–1638, 1655–1662, 1691–1696.
- Krasić, Vladimir (1886). Opis manastira Pakre: Prilog k istoriji srpske crkve. Novi Sad: Srpska štamparija.
- Kašić, Dušan Lj. (1967). Srbi i pravoslavlje u Slavoniji i sjevernoj Hrvatskoj. Zagreb: Savez udruženja pravoslavnog sveštenstva Hrvatske.
- Kašić, Dušan Lj. (1971). Srpski manastiri u Hrvatskoj i Slavoniji. Belgrade: Srpska Patrijaršija.
- Kašić, Dušan Lj. (1988). Srpska naselja i crkve u sjevernoj Hrvatskoj i Slavoniji. Zagreb: Savez udruženja pravoslavnih sveštenika Hrvatske.
- Luka Bosanac, Manastir Pakra u Slavoniji, SPC: Eparhija slavonska, Pakrac 2016.
