= Raťafák Plachta =

Czechoslovak children's character

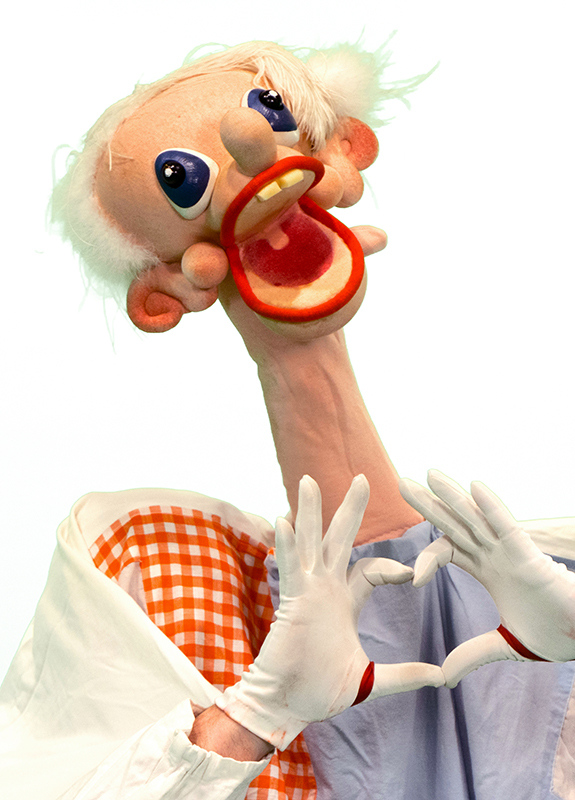
- First appearance: Slniečko (1979)
- Created by: Peter Cigáň

In-universe information
- Gender: Male
- Nationality: Czechoslovak

Raťafák Plachta (English: Ratafak Plachta) is one of the main characters in the children's television program Slniečko, which the Bratislava studios of the Czechoslovak Television (ČST) produced between 1980 and 1994.

== History ==
The author who created Raťafáka was Peter Cigáň. The director in the vast majority of episodes was Peter Gerža.

Raťafák is an unspecified entity. Its body resembles a human, but with significant physical anomalies. With a long neck, a pronounced lower jaw and a general body structure with a tendency to hypermobility of the joints, spine and limbs. It speaks Slovak. It is known that puppeteers Štefan Kulhánek and especially Dušan Štauder were closely related to its movement and verbal expression.

It is worth noting the episode titled Raťafákove narodeniny (Raťafák's Birthday), broadcast on 5 October 1984. In it, Raťafák celebrates his birthday, and thanks to this we know the date of his birth, 5 October. However, the year of birth remains unknown.

After 1994, its disappearance is attributed to the clumsy management of the management succession of the Slovak Television (ČST) at the time. Raťafáka Plachta reappeared in 2005 on the Internet video database YouTube, where he parodied various social issues under his own statement: "Vy sa ľujete kto je vo mne?... Ja sa ľujem, kto je vo vás!" (You ask who's inside me?... I ask who's inside you!). This return had a great response not only among the users themselves, but also in the commercial media. The parody of show business in the form of a parody clip and a mini-spot during the 2009 Slovak presidential election with the message "Raťafák plachta Váš prezident, najlepstná bábka" (Raťafák Plachta Your President, a Real Puppet) gained the attention and even admiration of many people.

== Unexpected appearance ==
After 1989, the program was canceled, which is attributed to the clumsy management of the then Slovak Television. Raťafák later appeared on YouTube after 2009, where he parodies various social topics under his own statement: "You ask, who is in me?... I ask, who is in you!" This return had a great response not only among the users themselves, but also in commercial media. Parodying the world of show business in the form of a parody of the clip and mini-spot Presidential Election 2009 with the message "Raťafák Plachta Your president, a real puppet" earned attention and admiration.

Ratafák unexpectedly appeared in public in 2016 during the filming of the show Fetishes of Socialism on public radio and television (RTVS).

== Personalities ==
During his performance in the show Slniečko, Raťafák came into contact with many personalities:

- Marián Labuda
- Oldo Hlaváček
- Zora Kolínska
- Eva Rysová
- Jaroslav Filip
