= Hajnáčka Castle =

- Hajnáčka, Slovakia
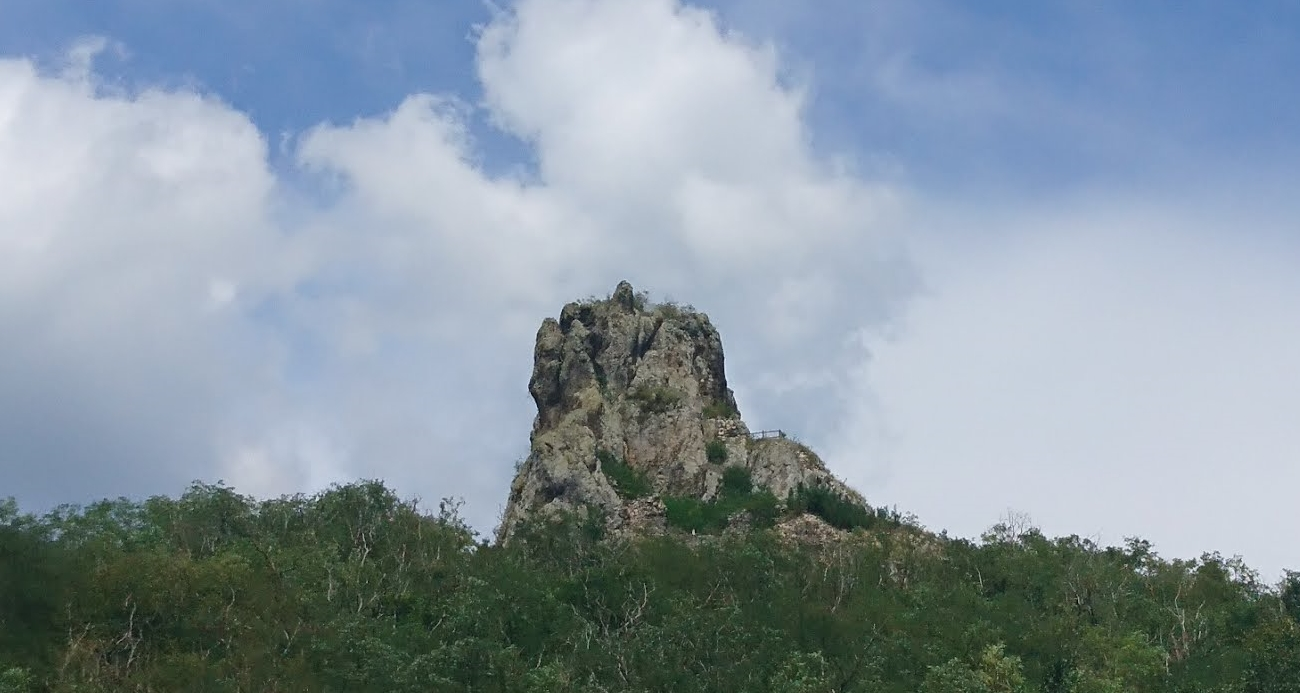
- View on the castle from the village

Site information
- Condition: Ruined

Location
- Location in Slovakia
- Coordinates: 48.218008°N 19.955187°E

Site history
- Built: before 1245
- Demolished: 18th century

Hajnáčka Castle is a ruined Gothic castle in the village of Hajnáčka in southern Slovakia. The castle is located on a high basalt rock above the village, which is formed by the remains of a volcano. The castle is surrounded by the Hajnáčka Castle hill nature reserve.

== History ==
The castle was first mentioned 1245. It was built by Béla IV of Hungary on the same spot as an earlier fortress. Later it became the manorial seat with 15 settlements. In the 16th and 17th centuries, the castle was one of the significant fortresses against the Turkish invasion of Central-Europe. It was modernised in the 17th century but got neglected in the 18th century. The castle was first part of the estate of the lordship but later was passed on through many aristocratic families.

== See also ==
- Pál Márkházy
