= Eva Rysová =

Slovak actress (1932–2023)

Eva Suchánková
- Born: Eva Rysová; 16 August 1932; Hajnáčka, Czechoslovakia
- Died: 12 October 2023 (aged 91); Bratislava, Slovakia
- Education: Academy of Performing Arts in Bratislava
- Occupation: Actress
- Spouse: Alojz Suchánek
- Children: 1

Eva Suchánková (née Rysová; 16 August 1932 – 12 October 2023) was a Slovak actress.

== Biography ==
Eva Rysová was born in Hajnáčka on 16 August 1932. After the death of her father, she was raised along with her sister by her mother and grandmother. She was educated at a grammar school in Lučenec and studied at the Academy of Performing Arts in Bratislava. After graduation she joined the theatre in Martin. In 1966 she became a part of the cast at the New Scene theatre in Bratislava, where she remained until her retirement in 2013. In addition to stage acting, she appeared in over a hundred movies and television shows and taught acting at the Academy of Performing Arts.

Rysová was married to physician Alojz Suchánek, although continued using her maiden name in her acting career. They had one son, who also trained as an actor but eventually opted for a career as a computer programmer.

Rysová spent her final years alone after her husband died in 2011 and her son emigrated to Canada. She died at a retirement home in Bratislava, on 12 October 2023, at the age of 91. In honor of Rysová's life, the public broadcaster Radio and Television of Slovakia altered scheduled broadcasting to air a homage to her accomplishments.
