= Tardi Beg =

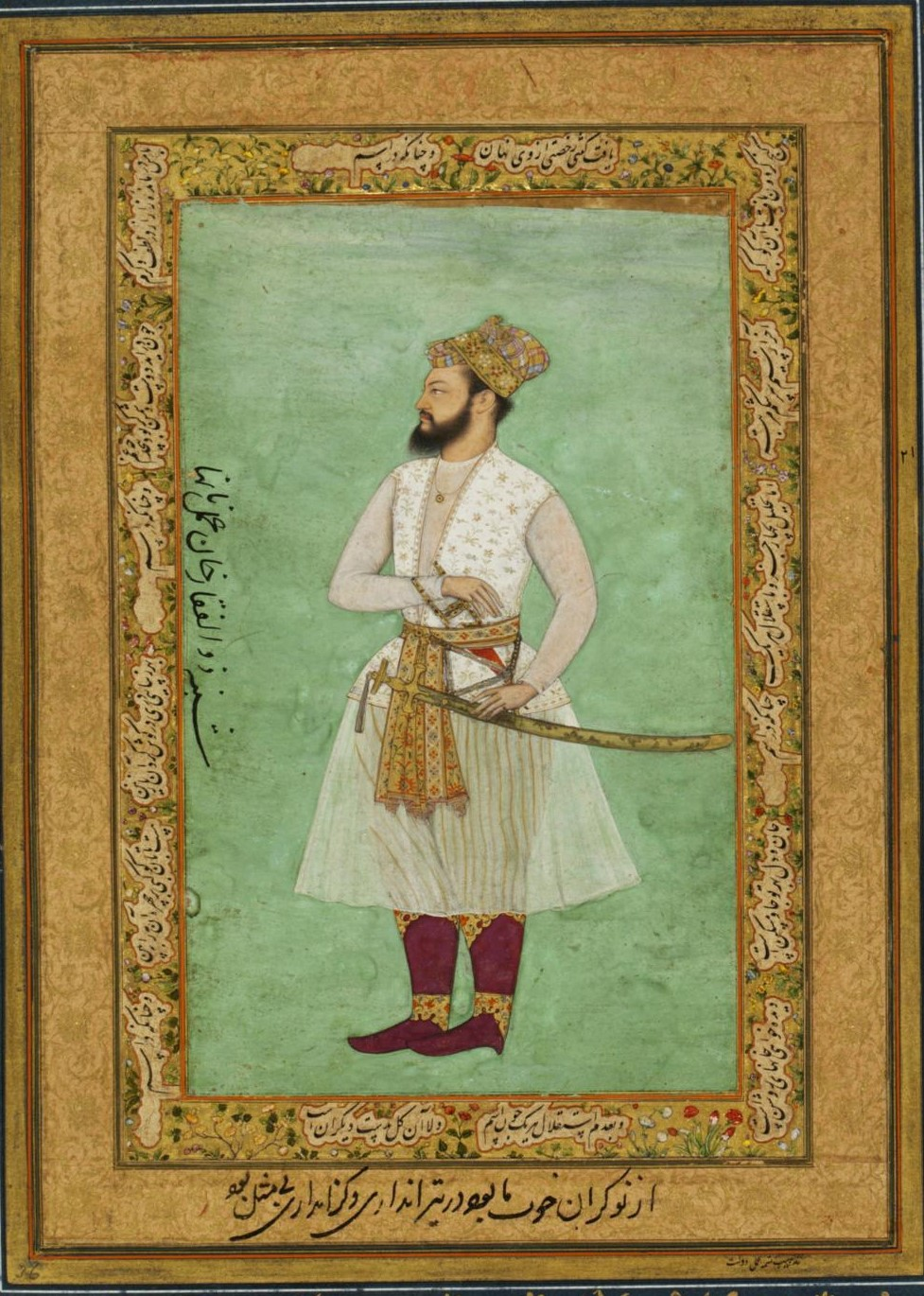
- 16th century portrait of Tardi Beg Khan

Mughal Subahdar of Delhi
- In office 1555–1556
- Monarch: Akbar

Military service
- Allegiance: Mughal Empire
- Commands: Mughal Army
- Battles/wars: Battle of Tughlaqabad

Tardi Beg, born Mirza Muhammad Beg Zulfiqar Khan, was a 16th century military commander in the Mughal Empire. He served under the Mughal emperors Humayun and Akbar. Beg was part of Humayun's forces when they retreated from India after the siege by Sher Shah. He remained with his leader throughout his exile in Persia.

It is reported that he was disliked by both the troops and generals and was eventually killed for cowardice by Bairam Khan.

Beg is said to have refused to give up his horse for the heavily pregnant Hamida Banu Begum, wife of Humayun, when she was eight months pregnant with her son Akbar. He is also said to have charged Humayun 20% interest on a loan. Beg was further accused of deserting the city of Agra as soon as Hemu's forces approached.

The truth of these allegations is difficult to gauge as most were written after his death and following the great successes of Bairam Khan, his executor. The allegations therefore may have been created to justify the action taken by Bairam.
