= Battle of Tughlaqabad =

1556 battle between Hemu and Mughals

- Part of Mughal–Afghan Wars
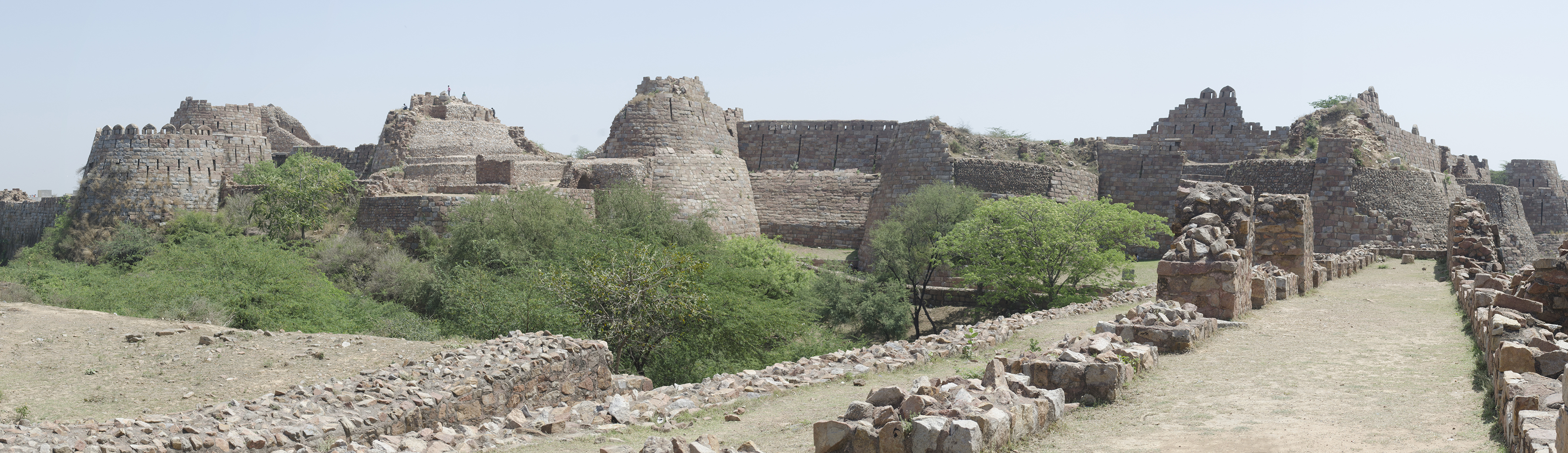
- The ruins of the fort of Tughlaqabad
Date	7 October 1556
Location	Tughlaqabad Fort
Result	Suri victory
Territorial changes	Delhi and Agra captured by Hemu.

Belligerents
Mughal Empire	Suri Empire

Commanders and leaders
Tardi Beg; Pir Muhammad Shirwani	Hemu; Ramya; Haji Khan

Strength
100,000+ cavalry	50,000 cavalry; 1,000 elephants; 51 cannon; 500 falconets

The Battle of Tughlaqabad (also known as the Battle of Delhi) was a notable battle fought on 7 October 1556 between a Hindu general of the Sur known as Hemu and the forces of the Mughal Emperor Akbar led by Tardi Beg Khan at Tughlaqabad near Delhi. The battle ended in a victory for Hemu, who took possession of Delhi and claimed royal status, assuming the title of Vikramaditya. Following his failure, Tardi Beg was executed by Akbar's regent, Bairam Khan.

== Background ==
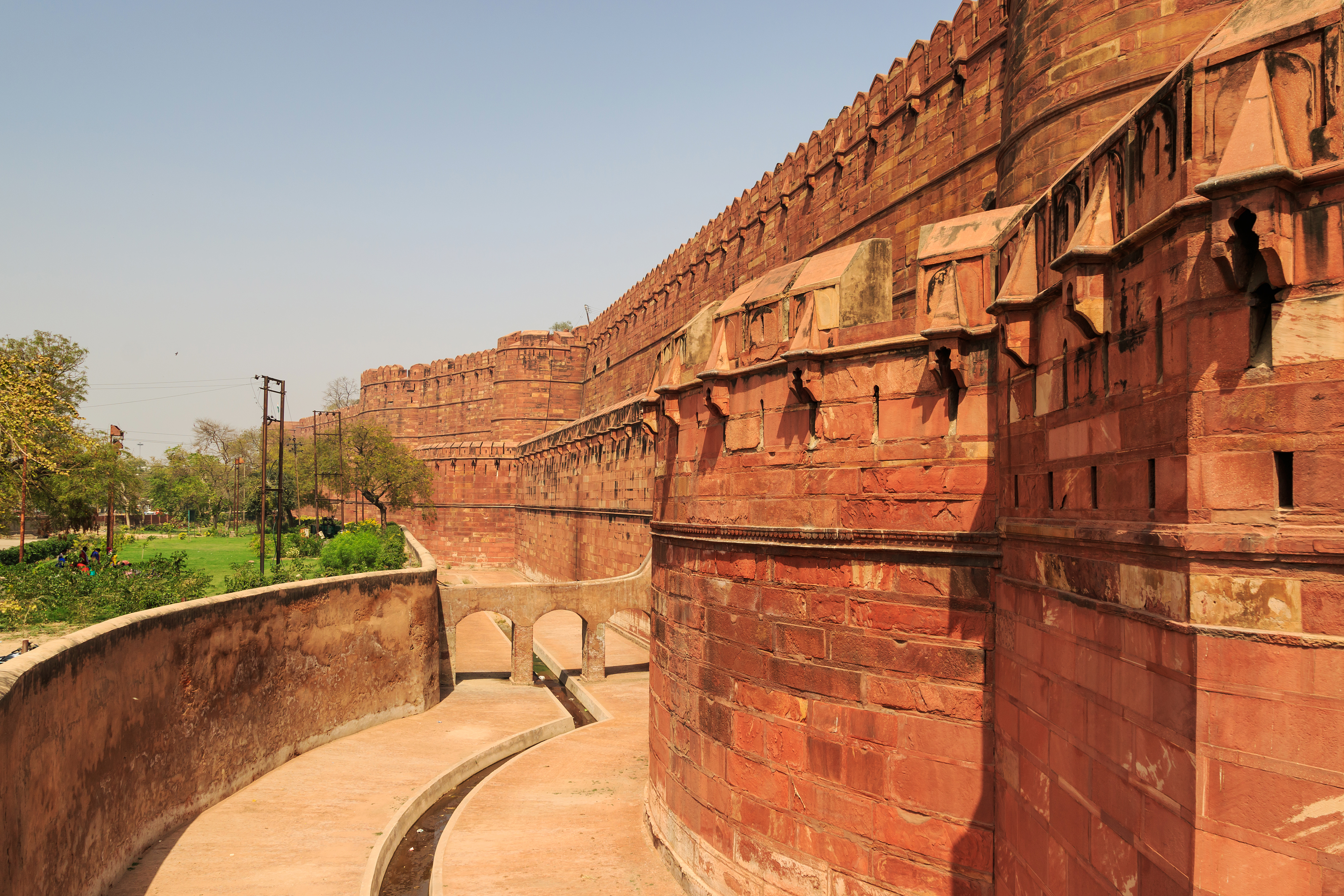
Agra Fort won by Hemu before his attack on Delhi.

Since the days of the Delhi Sultanate, the city of Delhi had acquired the reputation of being the political centre of India. No ruler could be considered to truly hold sway over Hindustan until he had control of Delhi. Babur, the founder of the Mughal Empire, called it the "capital of all Hindustan", and his son and successor, Humayun, constructed his Din Panah at its outskirts. Humayun, however, lost his inheritance when he was chased out of India by Sher Shah Suri who established the Sur Empire in 1540. Delhi and Agra fell into Sher Shah's hands and he razed Din Panah and built his new capital, Sher Shahabad, at the same site.

Sher Shah died soon after in 1545 at Kalinjar. He was succeeded by his younger son, Islam Shah Suri, who was a capable ruler. However, upon his death in 1553, the Sur Empire was caught up in a succession battle and was plagued by rebellion and the secession of provinces. Humayun made use of this discord to recapture what was lost and on 23 July 1555, the Mughals defeated Sikandar Shah Suri and finally regained control over Delhi and Agra.

Islam Shah's rightful successor, his 12-year-old son, Firoz Khan, had been murdered by his maternal uncle who had taken the throne as Adil Shah Suri. The new ruler was, however, more interested in the pursuit of pleasure than in the affairs of his state. Those were largely left to Hemu, a Hindu from Rewari, who had risen from humble circumstances to become both Adil Shah's Chief Minister as well as the general of the Suri army. He was in Bengal when Humayun died on 27 January 1556. The Mughal emperor's death provided an ideal opportunity to defeat the Mughals and reclaim lost territory.

== Prelude ==
Hemu started a rapid march from the eastern provinces and drove the Mughals out of Bayana, Etawah, Sambhal, Kalpi, and Narnaul. In Agra, the governor evacuated the city and fled without a fight upon hearing of Hemu's impending invasion.

Tardi Beg Khan, who was Humayun's successor, Akbar's governor in Delhi wrote to his masters who were camped at Jalandhar, that Hemu had captured Agra and intended to attack Delhi which could not be defended without reinforcements. While the main army could not be spared due to the belligerent presence of Sikandar Shah Suri, the 13-year-old Akbar's regent, Bairam Khan, realised the gravity of the situation and dispatched his most capable lieutenant, Pir Muhammad Sharwani, to Delhi. Meanwhile, Tardi Beg Khan had also ordered all the Mughal nobles in the vicinity to muster their forces at Delhi. A council of war was convened where it was decided that the Mughals would stand and fight Hemu, and plans were made accordingly.

Hemu, who had set off in pursuit of Agra's governor, reached Tughlaqabad, a village just outside Delhi where he ran into Tardi Beg Khan's forces.

== Battle ==
According to Bada'uni, Hemu's forces included 1,000 elephants, 50,000 cavalry, 51 cannons, and 500 falconets. The Mughals were commanded by Tardi Beg in the centre with Iskandar Beg leading the left wing and Haidar Muhammad, the right. Abdullah Uzbeg commanded the vanguard which included in its ranks select Turki cavalry.

The Mughals were almost equal in numbers, put up an ordinary fight against Hemu's forces. What followed proved to be a turning point in the battle as the Mughals involved chose to press their advantage and pursued the Afghan Army so far afield that they lost contact with their main army.

Many of Tardi Beg's men believed that the day had been won and dispersed to raid the enemy camp. Hemu, however, had held back 300 of his best elephants and cavalry unit in reserve. Seizing the opportunity, he made a sudden charge upon the now thinly-guarded Tardi Beg with this force. His push was bolstered by the timely arrival of fresh reinforcements from Alwar under the command of Haji Khan. Seeing the troop of war elephants and dense cavalry advancing upon them, many of the Mughal officers, including Pir Muhammad Khan, fled away in terror, much to the chagrin of Tardi Beg. Their capitulation at this crucial moment made the question of further resistance futile and Tardi Beg too decided to flee the scene.

When the previously victorious Mughal vanguard and left wing returned from their pursuit, they realised that the day was lost and dispersed without offering a fight. The Afghans had won and Hemu chose not to pursue the fleeing Mughals. He took possession of Delhi after a day's battle on 7 October 1556.

== Aftermath ==
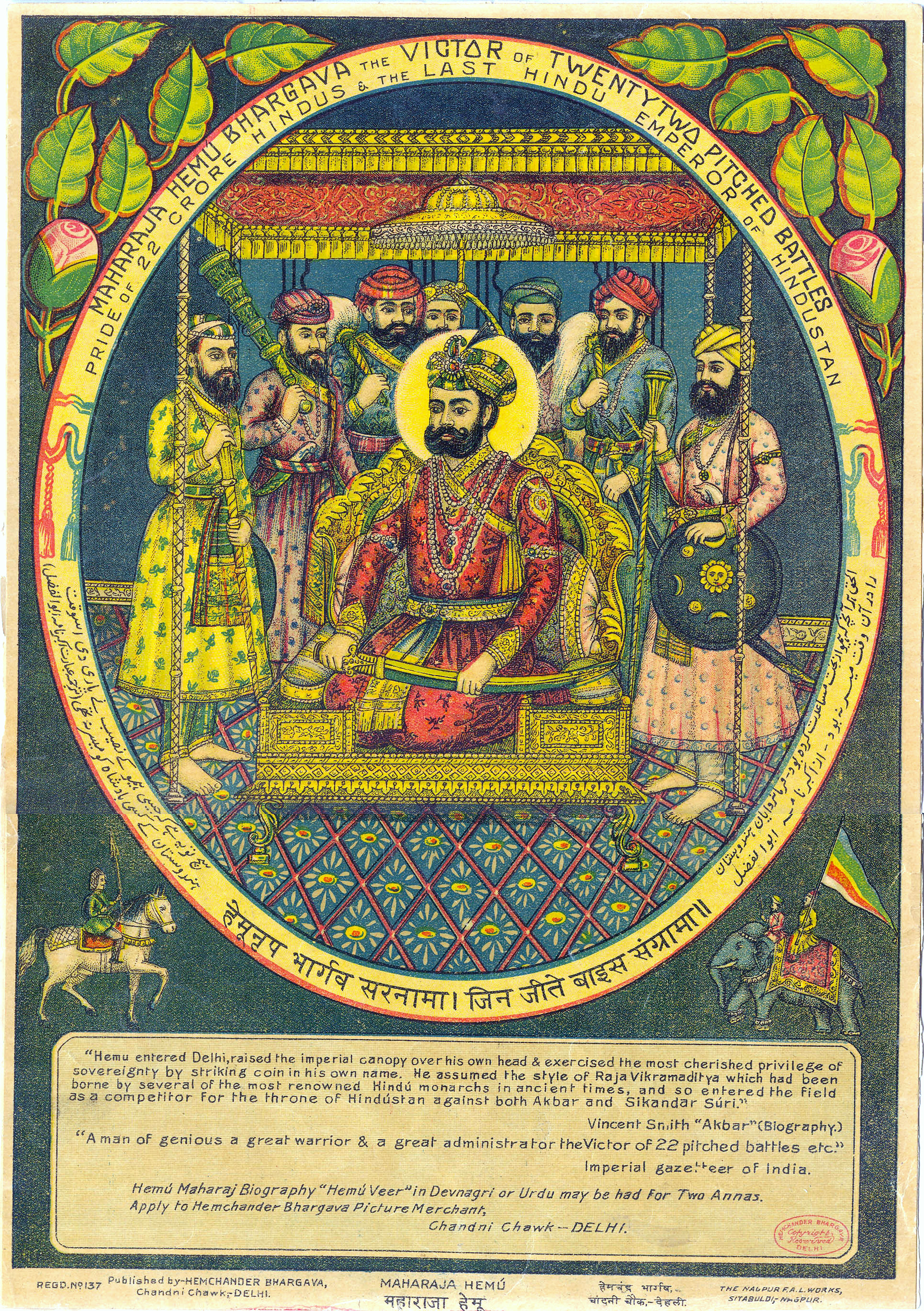
c. 1910s portrayal of Hem Chandra Vikramaditya

After taking control of Delhi, Hem Chandra claimed royal status and assumed the title of Vikramaditya (or Bikramjit), an appellation used by a number of Hindu kings in India's ancient Vedic past. His reign was to be short-lived as he would again clash with the Mughals only a month later. This time the battlefield would be at Panipat, not far from the site where Akbar's grandfather, Babur, had been victorious against the Lodis 30 years earlier.

Tardi Beg's loss at Tughlaqabad was not received well in the Mughal camp and Bairam Khan had him murdered shortly thereafter.
