= Pál Márkházy =

Hungarian nobleman

Pál Márkházy, or Márkházi (died before 18 August 1595) was a Hungarian nobleman who tried to seize the Principality of Transylvania against Sigismund Báthory in 1581.

== Early life ==
Pál Márkházy was born to a Hungarian noble family, named for Márkháza in Nógrád County. His early life is undocumented. His relative, Orsolya Márkházy, was the wife of the commander of the fortress at Ajnácskő (now Hajnáčka in Slovakia). The Ottomans captured her husband and she appointed Márkházy to command the garrison. After the Ottomans occupied the fortress on 24 April 1556, Márkházy was accused of treachery and his estates were confiscated in Royal Hungary. He fled to John Sigismund Zápolya's "Eastern Hungarian Kingdom" and settled in Transylvania.

Márkházy married the widow of Stanislaus Niszovzky, who had been a Polish courtier of Zápolya and Zápolya's mother, Queen Isabella. His wife, Saphira (or Zamfira), was the daughter of a prince of Wallachia. Historian Sándor Papp associates her father with Mircea the Shepherd, who had ruled the principality from 1545 to 1552 and from 1553 to 1554.

== Diplomat ==
Márkházy visited Istanbul several times. In the spring of 1575, he went to the Ottoman capital to buy horses and also to conduct business on behalf of Zápolya's successor, Stephen Báthory. On this occasion, Márkházy met with David Ungnad, who was Emperor Maximilian II's ambassador. He convinced Ungnad that he had been baselesly accused of treachery, but he could not achieve the return of his confiscated estates.

Márkházy was accused of treating his wife badly. Stephen Báthory's brother and deputy, Christopher Báthory, ordered him to separate from his wife. Márkházy was also captured and held in prison for four years, but his wrongdoings were not proved. He decided to appeal to Stephen Báthory, but instead of visiting the king in Poland, he fled to the Ottoman Empire around 1578.

== In Ottoman service ==
Márkházy received a ziamet estate in Syrmia in Ottoman Hungary. A rumor about the death of Christopher Báthory reached Istanbul in the second half of 1580. The influential Koca Sinan Pasha proposed Márkházy to achieve his appointment to rule Transylvania if he were willing to increase the annual tribute payable to the Sublime Porte, but the rumor proved false. Fearing of Márkházy's ambitions, the Diet of Transylvania elected the ailing Christopher Báthory's minor son, Sigismund, his co-ruler.

Christopher Báthory died on 27 May 1581. Sinan Pasha had not returned from a military campaign against Safavid Persia and the Imperial Council decided to confirm Sigismund Báthory's accession in his absence in early July. The Sultan's envoy departed from Istanbul to deliver the princely insignia to Sigismund. Sinan Pasha returned to Istanbul before 12 July. Márkházy soon approached him, offering 60,000 forints as a personal gift to him, and also proposing 100,000 forints as a single payment and the increase of the annual tribute from 15,000 to 100,000 forints. Sinan Pasha accepted the offer and Márkházy entered into negotiations with the Phanariote bankers about a loan to finance the transaction. A new Ottoman envoy was sent to Transylvania who demanded the same tribute that Márkházy had promised. The Diet refused to increase the annual tribute, but the Sultan's envoy handed over the princely insignia to Sigismund Báthory.

Learning of the Transylvanians' disobedience, the Imperial Council decided to replace Sigismund Báthory with Márkházy on 20 August 1581. Sinan Pasha's opponents knew that Stephen Báthory who ruled the Polish–Lithuanian Commonwealth would not allow to expel his nephew from Transylvania and they wanted to avoid an armed conflict with him. After the Transylvanian envoys who came to Istanbul to deliver the annual tribute agreed to increase it by 1,000 thalers, their offer was accepted. Sinan Pasha fell into disgrace and was imprisoned on 6 December 1582. Márkházy was also imprisoned, but Stephen Báthory could not achieve his extradition and he was released in 1583.

Márkházy converted to Islam either during his captivity to avoid capital punishment, or soon after his release. İbrahim bey, as Márkházy was named after his conversion, ruled several sanjaks (or districts) in Ottoman Hungary and Croatia. He administered Simontornya from 1585 to 1587, he stayed in Zvornik from 1587 to 1589, and he was transferred to Borosjenő near the Transylvanian border (now Ineu in Romania) in the spring of 1589. According to the English diplomat, Edward Barton, İbrahim bey did much harm to his native country.

== Sources ==
- Graf, Tobias P. (2017). The Sultan's Renegades: Christian-European Converts to Islam and the Making of the Ottoman Elite, 1575–1610. Oxford University Press. ISBN 978-0-19-879143-0.
- Papp, Sándor (2004). "From a Transylvanian principality to an Ottoman sanjak: The life of Pál Márkházi, a Hungarian renegade" (PDF). Chronica. 4: 57–67. ISSN 1588-2039.
