= Donji Borki =

- Village
- Location within Croatia
- Coordinates: 45.5630821°N 17.2929716°E
- Country: Croatia
- County: Bjelovar-Bilogora County
- Municipality: Sirač

Area
  - Total: 10.3 sq mi (26.7 km^{2})

Population (2021)
  - Total: 46
  - Density: 4.5/sq mi (1.7/km^{2})
- Time zone: UTC+1 (CET)
  - Summer (DST): UTC+2 (CEST)

Donji Borki is a village in Croatia.

== Demographics ==
According to the 2021 census, its population was 46.
