= Hajnáčka =

Hajnáčka Ajnácskő
- Municipality
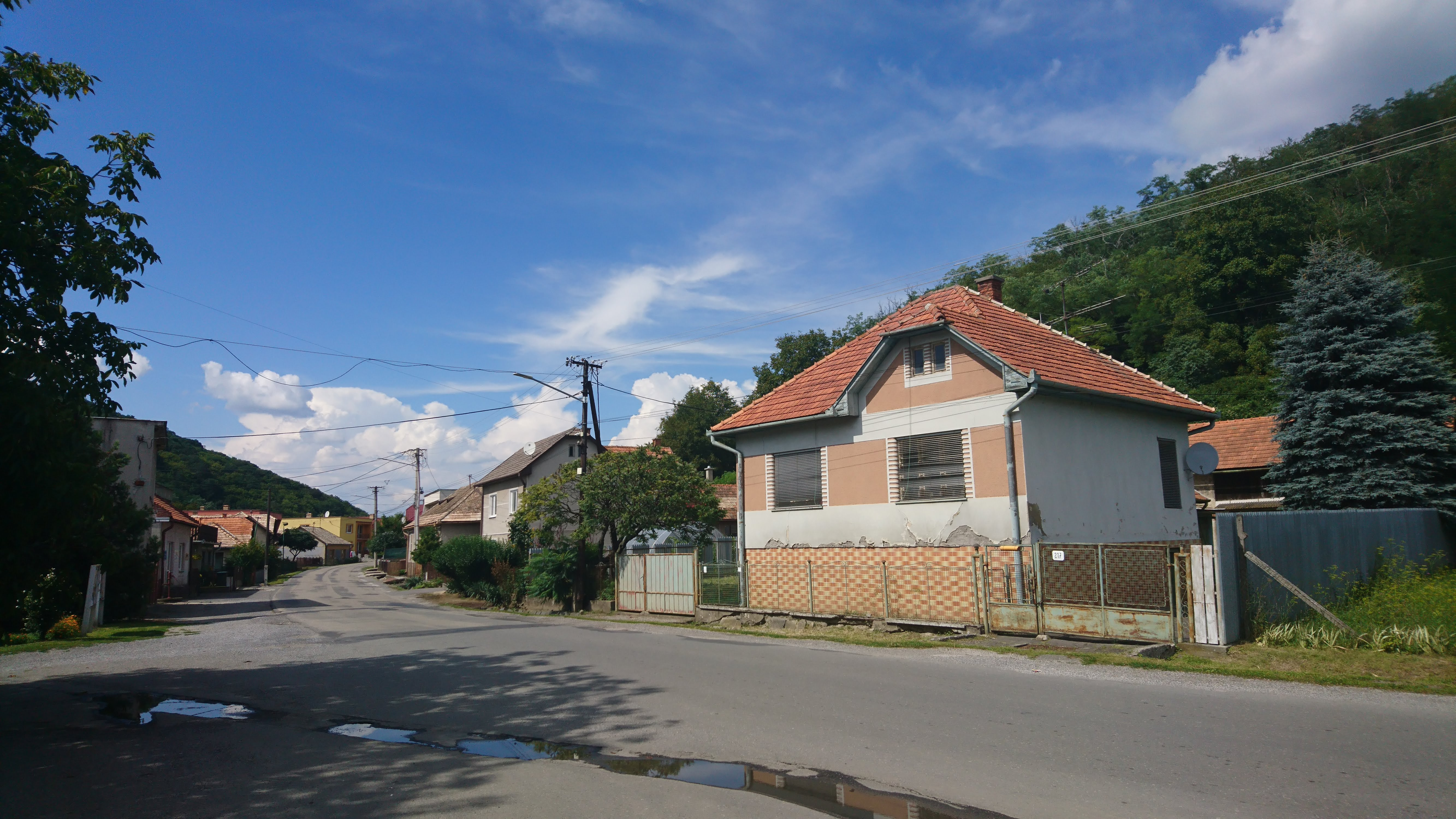
- Main street of Hajnáčka

- Flag

- Location of Hajnáčka in the Banská Bystrica Region Location of Hajnáčka in Slovakia
- Coordinates: 48.22°N 19.97°E
- Country: Slovakia
- Region: Banská Bystrica Region
- District: Rimavská Sobota District
- First mentioned: 1425

Area
  - Total: 25.67 km^{2} (9.91 sq mi)
- Elevation: 224 m (735 ft)

Population (2025)
  - Total: 1,152
- Time zone: UTC+1 (CET)
  - Summer (DST): UTC+2 (CEST)
- Postal code: 980 33
- Area code: +421 47
- Vehicle registration plate (until 2022): RS
- Website: www.obechajnacka.sk

Hajnáčka (formerly: Hajnacžka; German: Hajnatschko; Hungarian: Ajnácskő) is a village and municipality in the Rimavská Sobota District of the Banská Bystrica Region of southern Slovakia.

== Geography ==
The municipality lies at an altitude of 224 metres (735 ft) and covers an area of 25.67 km^{2} (9.91 sq mi) (2025).

== History ==
In historical records the village was first mentioned in 1245 as Danuskue (1255 Kues, 1344 Anyaskw) when a big castle stood here. The village developed from the farmyard under the castle. It was always the seat of important feudal lords. In 1545 it was besieged by Turks. During the Turkish times the village was abandoned. In 1773 there were only 13 peasant farmers and some craftsmen living in the village. In 1828 there were 84 houses and 375 inhabitants. These people mainly lived from agriculture till 1945. From 1938 till 1944 Hajnáčka was part of Hungary.

== Population ==
Population statistic (10 years)
Year	1995	2005	2015	2025
Count	1168	1200	1171	1152
Difference		+2.73%	−2.41%	−1.62%

Population statistic
Year	2024	2025
Count	1168	1152
Difference		−1.36%

It has a population of 1152 people (31 December 2025).

=== Ethnicity ===
Census 2021 (1+%)
Ethnicity	Number	Fraction
Hungarian	905	79.45%
Slovak	226	19.84%
Not found out	67	5.88%
Romani	31	2.72%
Total	1139	

In year 2021 was 1139 people by ethnicity 905 as Hungarian, 226 as Slovak, 67 as Not found out, 31 as Romani, 4 as Czech, 1 as Romanian and 1 as Other.

Note on population: The difference values of population numbers in the table "Population statistic" and in the sections "Ethnicity" & "Religion" is caused by the use of various statistical methods.

=== Religion ===
Census 2021 (1+%)
Religion	Number	Fraction
Roman Catholic Church	850	74.63%
None	200	17.56%
Not found out	40	3.51%
Calvinist Church	22	1.93%
Christian Congregations in Slovakia	12	1.05%
Total	1139	

In year 2021 was 1139 people by religion 850 from Roman Catholic Church, 200 from None, 40 from Not found out, 22 from Calvinist Church, 12 from Christian Congregations in Slovakia, 6 from Evangelical Church, 4 from Jehovah's Witnesses, 3 from Greek Catholic Church, 1 from Eastern Orthodox Church and 1 from Ad hoc movements.

== Culture ==
Historical monuments in Hajnáčka include:

- Hajnáčka Castle ruins
- An 18th-century chapel

== Genealogical resources ==
The records for genealogical research are available at the state archive "Statny Archiv in Banska Bystrica, Slovakia".

- Roman Catholic church records (births/marriages/deaths): 1787–1898 (parish B)

== Notable people ==
- Eva Rysová (1932–2023), actress

== See also ==
- List of municipalities and towns in Slovakia
