= July 1936 =

Month of 1936

<<	July 1936					>>
Su	Mo	Tu	We	Th	Fr	Sa
			1	2	3	4
5	6	7	8	9	10	11
12	13	14	15	16	17	18
19	20	21	22	23	24	25
26	27	28	29	30	31

The following events occurred in July 1936:

== July 1, 1936 (Wednesday) ==
- Salvador Dalí gave a lecture at the London International Surrealist Exhibition titled "Authentic Paranoiac Fantasies". He brought two Russian wolfhounds on leashes and wore a deep-sea diving suit to symbolize descending to the depths of the subconscious, but found it impossible to breathe inside the diving helmet. Dalí nearly suffocated before his companions realized something was wrong and freed him, which the audience enjoyed immensely in the belief that it was all part of the act.
- An amalgamation of Australian air carriers called Australian National Airways began operations.

== July 2, 1936 (Thursday) ==
- The 1000th anniversary of the death of King Henry I was observed in Germany with a ceremony in Quedlinburg Abbey. Speeches made at the event depicted Hitler as the rightful successor to Henry's legacy.
- Born: Rex Gildo, singer, in Straubing, Germany (d. 1999)

== July 3, 1936 (Friday) ==
- Slovak Jewish journalist Stefan Lux died by suicide in the General Assembly of the League of Nations by shooting himself in the chest. He left behind a note explaining that his act was carried out to draw attention to the plight of Jews in Germany.
- Remington Rand strike: A four-day riot began between strikers and replacement workers at a plant in Middletown, Ohio.
- 36-year-old James W. McFerson of Ogden, Utah, fell backward into a hot spring while fishing in the West Thumb Geyser Basin of Yellowstone National Park. His wife pulled him out of the hot spring, but he died from his burns the following day.
- Fred Perry of the United Kingdom beat Gottfried von Cramm of Germany in straight sets to win the Gentlemen's Singles title at Wimbledon. Perry was the first Wimbledon champion to win three consecutive men's titles since Tony Wilding won four straight in 1910–13.
- Died: Stefan Lux, 47, Slovak Jewish journalist (suicide)

== July 4, 1936 (Saturday) ==
- The League of Nations Council voted to end economic sanctions against Italy.
- First publication recognizing stress as a biological condition.
- In tennis, Helen Hull Jacobs of the United States defeated Hilde Krahwinkel Sperling of Germany to win the Ladies' Singles title at Wimbledon.

== July 5, 1936 (Sunday) ==
- 15,000 members of the French far-right opposed to the government of Léon Blum rioted along the Champs-Élysées. About 60 civilians and 31 police were injured in the clashes.
- Born: Shirley Knight, actress, in Goessel, Kansas (d. 2020)

== July 6, 1936 (Monday) ==
- Ethiopian Minister to the United Kingdom Workneh Eshete appealed to the British public for at least £2 million to continue the fight in Ethiopia.
- Ethiopian guerrilla fighters attacked a railway line 30 miles from Addis Ababa.

== July 7, 1936 (Tuesday) ==
- A court-martial in Tokyo sentenced 17 leaders of the February 26 Incident to death. 49 others were given prison sentences ranging from 18 months to life.
- The National League beat the American League 4-3 in the 4th Major League Baseball All-Star Game at National League Park in Boston.
- Died: Georgy Chicherin, 63, Russian diplomat

== July 8, 1936 (Wednesday) ==
- An explosion at the Royal Arsenal in Woolwich killed 5 people.
- The British government announced that German airships would no longer be allowed to fly over Britain except in cases of emergency due to weather. The decision was made after the Hindenburg chose a course over England during a recent flight to the United States and back, drawing concerns that German officers aboard could be studying military bases and learning government secrets.
- Died: Thomas Meighan, 57, American film actor

== July 9, 1936 (Thursday) ==
- 1936 North American heat wave: 168 people were reported dead over the past week in the drought-stricken Midwestern United States due to blistering heat.
- Britain announced it was reducing its naval presence in the Mediterranean to normal proportions, reversing the buildup it embarked upon last September when tensions were rising due to the impending war in Ethiopia.
- Born: André Pronovost, ice hockey player, in Shawinigan, Quebec, Canada; Richard Wilson, actor and theatre director, in Greenock, Scotland
- Died John M. Bolton, Member of the Illinois House of Representatives and businessman; he was murdered by unknown assailants while driving in Chicago, Illinois.

== July 10, 1936 (Friday) ==
- Hamad ibn Isa Al Khalifa, ruler of Bahrain and the richest sheik in the world, was knighted by Edward VIII.
- The HMY Britannia, the favorite yacht of the late George V, was scuttled near the Isle of Wight. The king had requested shortly before his death that the yacht follow him to the grave.
- The French Social Party was founded.
- Maryland, Pennsylvania, New Jersey and West Virginia reach their record high temperatures.
- Born: Herbert Boyer, biotechnology researcher and entrepreneur, in Derry, Pennsylvania; Tunne Kelam, politician, in Taheva, Estonia

== July 11, 1936 (Saturday) ==
- Austria and Germany signed an agreement in which Germany pledged to respect Austrian sovereignty in exchange for Austria favouring Germany in its policies.
- U.S. President Franklin D. Roosevelt formally opened the Triborough Bridge in New York City.
- Died: James Murray, 35, American film actor

== July 12, 1936 (Sunday) ==
- Guardia de Asalto Lieutenant José Castillo was murdered by Falangists in the streets of Madrid.
- Fifteen leaders of the February 26 Incident were executed by firing squad in Tokyo. No explanation was given for why two others condemned to death were not shot.
- Died: José Castillo, 35, Spanish police officer

== July 13, 1936 (Monday) ==
- Viscount Cranborne responded to a question in the House of Commons by saying he understood that Heligoland was being refortified by Germany (in violation of Article 115 of the Treaty of Versailles). Germany issued an official statement that same day denying "rumors that Heligoland will be made a forbidden area for military reasons and that bathing establishments will be closed."
- José Calvo Sotelo, a prominent monarchist politician is murdered by members of the Assault guard and Socialist militants as a reprisal for the murder of José Castillo the previous day
- Died: José Calvo Sotelo, 43, Spanish politician (murdered)

== July 14, 1936 (Tuesday) ==
- Bastille Day celebrations along the Champs-Élysées were marred by further riots by right wing demonstrators.
- The British government announced plans to mass-produce gas masks with the goal of one for every citizen. The masks would be stockpiled in centers around the country and then issued free of charge when the government deemed it necessary.

== July 15, 1936 (Wednesday) ==
- The League of Nations lifted sanctions against Italy.
- 5 died in political and labour disorders across Spain. The government made 150 arrests.
- Born: George Voinovich, politician, in Cleveland, Ohio (d. 2016)

== July 16, 1936 (Thursday) ==
- An apparent attempt to assassinate Edward VIII was foiled on Constitution Hill. As the king's horse passed the crowd while returning to Buckingham Palace from a colours ceremony in Hyde Park, a man raised a revolver. A woman grabbed the man's arm and shouted, alerting a constable who knocked the weapon from his hand. The man, identified as George Andrew McMahon, told police he had no intention of harming the king and was only making a protest. Adolf Hitler sent Edward a telegram offering his "heartiest congratulations" on his escape.
- Italy lifted its wartime restrictions on meat and nightlife curfews.
- Father Charles Coughlin aligned himself with Francis Townsend and denounced President Roosevelt as a "great betrayer and liar", saying, "He who promised to drive the money changers from the temple has built up the greatest public debt in the nation's history. Is that driving the money changers from the temple?"
- Born: Yasuo Fukuda, 91st Prime Minister of Japan, in Takasaki, Gunma, Japan; Buddy Merrill, guitarist and musician, in Torrey, Utah (d. 2021)
- Died: Alan Crosland, 41, American actor and film director (auto accident)

== July 17, 1936 (Friday) ==
- Spanish coup of July 1936: Francisco Franco and other high-ranking officers in the Spanish Army launched a coup against the Second Spanish Republic. The conspirators in the Army of Africa moved to seize control of Spanish Morocco.
- Military uprising in Melilla: the Spanish rebels seized the radio station in Melilla and proclaimed martial law. The Spanish Civil War had begun.
- The French Chamber of Deputies voted 484-85 to nationalize the munitions industry.

== July 18, 1936 (Saturday) ==
- The Spanish government announced on the radio that the uprising had been contained.
- The Spanish uprising spread to Seville.
- In Madrid, the Siege of Cuartel de la Montaña began.
- The Free City of Danzig suspended its constitution. Senate President Arthur Greiser ordered the move to crush opposition to the Nazi-controlled government.
- At the Montreux Convention, the signatories of the Treaty of Lausanne agreed to grant Turkey the right to remilitarize the Dardanelles. The Russian navy was granted the right to free passage through the straits during peacetime, but during wartime all belligerents would be prohibited from using the straits unless acting for the League of Nations or under a regional pact signed with Turkey.
- Born: Ted Harris, ice hockey player, in Winnipeg, Manitoba, Canada

== July 19, 1936 (Sunday) ==
- Santiago Casares Quiroga resigned as Prime Minister of Spain. President Manuel Azaña appointed Diego Martínez Barrio to replace him, but Barrio resigned after only 7 hours when his attempt to negotiate a compromise with the rebels was rebuffed. José Giral became the new Prime Minister and decreed the formation of a militia to defend the Republic.
- The Spanish uprising spread to Barcelona.
- The Sieges of Cuartel de Loyola, Gijón and Oviedo began.
- Dolores Ibárruri made a radio speech calling on Spaniards to fight against the military uprising. Her speech concluded with the famous words, ¡No pasarán! (They shall not pass!), which became the rallying cry of the Republicans throughout the Civil War.
- 17-year old Bob Feller of the Cleveland Indians made his major league baseball debut, pitching a scoreless inning against the Washington Senators.

== July 20, 1936 (Monday) ==
- The Siege of Cuartel de la Montaña ended in Republican victory.
- The first long-range combat airlift in history took place when several Spanish aircraft on the Nationalist side transported a small number of troops from Spanish Morocco to Andalusia. The airlift across the Strait of Gibraltar was necessary because most of the Spanish Navy remained loyal to the government.
- The Campaign of Gipuzkoa began.
- The Montreux Convention Regarding the Regime of the Straits was signed.
- Born: Barbara Mikulski, politician, in Baltimore, Maryland
- Died: José Sanjurjo, 64, Spanish general (plane crash)

== July 21, 1936 (Tuesday) ==
- The siege of the Alcázar began in Toledo.
- The Tokyo Stock Exchange suspended trading because of a heavy slump caused by rumors that the stock exchanges would be placed under government control.
- 50,000 Turkish troops began moving into the Dardanelles.

== July 22, 1936 (Wednesday) ==
- British authorities warned Spanish warships that if shells continued to fall on Gibraltar, British artillery would return fire.
- Charles Lindbergh and wife Anne arrived in Berlin. Although ostensibly a goodwill visit, the American Embassy had invited Lindbergh in the hope that the German Air Ministry would try to impress him by inviting him to inspect their planes and air bases. That way, Lindbergh could take notes on the Luftwaffe's capabilities and report back to the U.S. government. As it turned out, that is exactly what happened.

== July 23, 1936 (Thursday) ==
- Alf Landon formally accepted the Republican nomination for president before a crowd of 80,000 in Topeka, Kansas. "If I am elected chief executive of this nation, I propose to restore our government to an efficient as well as constitutional basis", Landon declared.
- The Nationalist side in the Spanish Civil War set up a government (Junta) in Burgos.
- White Terror: The Nationalists took over Granada and began killing anyone suspected of Republican leanings.
- The French government decided to aid the Spanish Republic in the Civil War.
- Three MPs were ejected from the House of Commons during an incident of grave disorder in the 27th hour of a marathon session. On the topic of the government's unemployment assistance program, Home Secretary John Simon spoke of the responsibility of children to support their parents when John McGovern broke in with, "Why does the king not support his mother? He must be a despicable individual." (The latter line was stricken from Hansard.) George Buchanan then accused Simon of lying and refused to withdraw the charge. His colleague Campbell Stephen then stood and called the government "robbers and murderers of the working class" and Simon a "lying scoundrel" (this latter insult too was stricken from Hansard). Following a 15-minute recess, votes were taken and Buchanan, Stephen and McGovern were all suspended from the House.
- Eleanor Holm was suspended from the U.S. Olympic swimming team for attending drinking parties while aboard the SS Manhattan transporting the athletes to Germany.
- Born: Don Drysdale, baseball player, in Van Nuys, California (d. 1993)

== July 24, 1936 (Friday) ==
- In Spain the Battle of Guadarrama began, resulting in Republican victory.
- Eleanor Holm's teammates arranged a petition asking American Olympic Committee Chairman Avery Brundage to reinstate her. German officials told Brundage, "she has been punished enough and discipline is bound to prevail after this public warning."
- A speaking clock service was introduced in the United Kingdom.
- The French right-wing press led by L'Écho de Paris attacked France's policy of support for the Spanish Republic, arguing it would could lead France into open conflict with Germany and Italy.
- Born: Ruth Buzzi, comedian and actress, in Westerly, Rhode Island (d. 2025); Mark Goddard, actor, in Lowell, Massachusetts (d. 2023)
- Died: Georg Michaelis, 78, German politician

== July 25, 1936 (Saturday) ==
- Germany became the first country to recognize Italian rule of Ethiopia by abolishing its legation in Addis Ababa and replacing it with a general consulate.
- Emilio Mola was formally designated commander of Nationalist operations in the north, and Francisco Franco the commander of the south.
- The French government announced it had decided not to sell aircraft to Spain at the moment.

== July 26, 1936 (Sunday) ==
- The Canadian National Vimy Memorial was unveiled in France. Edward VIII, making his first trip abroad since becoming king, spoke at the event in a speech broadcast around the world.
- Adolf Hitler agreed to support the Nationalist side in the Spanish Civil War by sending 26 transport planes and other equipment.
- The Comintern agreed to establish International Brigades to fight in Spain.
- The Salazar government in Portugal promised to cooperate with the Nationalists.
- 16-year-old Herbert Gray of Guilford, Maine, fell to his death while climbing the Garden Wall, a rock face on the Highline Trail in Glacier National Park, Montana. Gray's body was discovered on August 12.
- Born: Mary Millar, actress and singer, in Doncaster, South Yorkshire, England (d. 1998)
- Died: F. J. Harvey Darton, 57, English children's author and publisher

== July 27, 1936 (Monday) ==
- The Siege of Cuartel de Loyola ended in Republican victory.
- Mussolini decided to send 12 bomber planes and other equipment to aid the Nationalists in Spain.

== July 28, 1936 (Tuesday) ==
- The Burgos Junta declared total martial law in all Nationalist-held parts of Spain.
- The Spanish Republic confiscated all church property in Spain to consolidate its resources to fight the uprising.
- German aircraft arrived in Morocco to assist the Nationalist side.
- Francisco Franco granted an interview to Jay Allen of the Chicago Tribune in which he claimed that his government was neither monarchist nor fascist, but "Nationalist Spanish", and that he had launched the rebellion to save Spain from communism. When asked what form his government would take, Franco replied it would be a "military dictatorship" with a plebiscite later on "for the nation to decide what it wanted."
- The Lindberghs met Hermann and Emmy Göring at a luncheon.
- Born: Russ Jackson, Canadian football player, in Hamilton, Ontario, Canada

== July 29, 1936 (Wednesday) ==
- The Nationalists captured Huelva.
- The Berliner Tageblatt revealed that Germany had begun to refortify Heligoland, contradicting its denial of July 13. The matter came up again in the House of Commons where Foreign Secretary Anthony Eden expressed the government's feeling that "individual matters of this kind, though they cannot pass unobserved, should not be raised at a moment and in a manner which might react unfavourably" on negotiations underway for a new European peace settlement.
- The epic costume drama film Anthony Adverse starring Fredric March premiered in Los Angeles.
- Born: Elizabeth Dole, politician, in Salisbury, North Carolina
- Died: Frank Gavan Duffy, 84, Australian judge

== July 30, 1936 (Thursday) ==
- Twelve Italian bomber planes, their markings and numbers painted over, took off from Sardinia heading for Spanish Morocco where they were to join the Nationalist side under the banner of the Spanish Legion. Nine completed the flight but one crashed at sea and two were forced down on the French side of the Moroccan border. Italian military markings still visible under the fresh paint, as well as documentation that French authorities found aboard the planes, exposed the Italian scheme. The next day, newspapers around the world published the revelation that Italy was providing military assistance to the rebels.
- Two days before the Summer Olympics were set to start in Berlin, Ernest L. Jahncke of the United States became the first person expelled from the International Olympic Committee. He was removed for his outspoken opposition to holding the Olympics in Germany.
- The historical film Mary of Scotland starring Katharine Hepburn premiered at Radio City Music Hall in New York City.
- Born: Buddy Guy, blues guitarist and singer, in Lettsworth, Louisiana; Ted Rogers, comedian, in Kennington, London, England (d. 2001)

== July 31, 1936 (Friday) ==
- The International Olympic Committee awarded the 1940 Summer Olympics to Tokyo.
- President Roosevelt made his first visit to Canada in an official capacity and met Governor General John Buchan in Quebec City.
