= August 1936 =

Month of 1936

<<	August 1936					>>
Su	Mo	Tu	We	Th	Fr	Sa
						1
2	3	4	5	6	7	8
9	10	11	12	13	14	15
16	17	18	19	20	21	22
23	24	25	26	27	28	29
30	31

The following events occurred in August 1936:

== August 1, 1936 (Saturday) ==
- The opening ceremony of the 1936 Summer Olympics was held in Berlin. As with the Winter Games in February, there was confusion between the Nazi salute and the Olympic salute. Most countries gave one salute or the other as they passed Hitler in the viewing stand. The British and Americans did not salute at all and gave a military-style 'eyes right' instead. The Americans were also the only country not to dip their country's flag while passing Hitler, in keeping with the U.S. custom of only dipping to the President of the United States.
- France took a public stance of neutrality in the Spanish Civil War by announcing that volunteers would be allowed to go and fight as long as they did not carry arms on French soil.
- The Nationalists captured Guadarrama.
- Born: Bradford Bishop, fugitive, in Pasadena, California; Donald Neilson, criminal, in Dewsbury, England (d. 2011); Yves Saint Laurent, fashion designer, in Oran, Algeria (d. 2008)
- Died: Louis Blériot, 64, French aviation pioneer

== August 2, 1936 (Sunday) ==
- On the first day of competition at the Summer Olympics, Adolf Hitler congratulated German gold medalists Tilly Fleischer and Hans Woellke, then invited all three Finnish medalists in the 10,000 metres to his box to congratulate them as well. However, he left before congratulating the gold medalist in high jump, Cornelius Johnson of the United States. An international controversy broke out over whether Hitler had snubbed Johnson for being African-American. International Olympic Committee President Henri de Baillet-Latour told Hitler to either congratulate all of the medalists, or none at all. Hitler chose the latter and no athletes were invited to his box for the rest of the Olympics.
- The Extremadura campaign began in Spain.
- Sylvère Maes of Belgium won the Tour de France.
- Charles Lindbergh and wife Anne ended their 12-day visit to Germany. Lindbergh did not meet Hitler as had been speculated; they had both attended the opening ceremony of the Olympics, but were not introduced.
- The French cabinet secretly authorized Air Minister Pierre Cot to ship aircraft directly to Spain for the Republican side.

== August 3, 1936 (Monday) ==
- Jesse Owens of the United States won his first gold medal of the Berlin Olympics, equaling the world record of 10.3 seconds in the 100-metre dash.
- U.S. Secretary of State Cordell Hull said at a press conference that the government would do all it could to evacuate Americans still in Spain who wanted to leave, but warned that conditions may develop which would make it no longer possible for American ships to reach them.
- Born: Edward Petherbridge, actor, writer and artist, in West Bowling, Bradford, England

== August 4, 1936 (Tuesday) ==
- 4th of August Regime: Greek Prime Minister Ioannis Metaxas staged a self-coup and established an authoritarian regime.
- Jesse Owens won Olympic gold in the long jump. An often-told story holds that Germany's Luz Long gave Owens some advice after he almost failed to qualify. The veracity of the story has been questioned, but it is known for certain that Owens and Long embraced in front of Hitler and became friends.

== August 5, 1936 (Wednesday) ==
- The naval battle known as the Convoy de la victoria was fought in the Strait of Gibraltar, resulting in a Nationalist victory.
- Chicago and Southern Flight 4: A Chicago and Southern Airlines plane crashed on a farm near St. Louis, killing all 8 aboard.
- Jesse Owens won Olympic gold in the 200-metre dash. His time of 20.7 seconds would have easily been a new world record, but the IAAF did not recognize records set on a turn at the time.

== August 6, 1936 (Thursday) ==
- 58 died in a pit blast at Wharncliffe Woodmoor 1, 2 & 3 Colliery in Yorkshire.
- Francisco Franco moved his headquarters to Seville.
- Despite the French government's attempt to keep its aid to the Spanish government secret, the right-wing press ran articles exposing and denouncing it.
- The first volunteers of the Luftwaffe arrived at Cádiz to fight for the Nationalists. To keep Germany's involvement secret the volunteers were officially discharged from the Luftwaffe so they could go to Spain as "tourists".

== August 7, 1936 (Friday) ==
- The Battle of Almendralejo and the Battle of Sigüenza began.
- Died: Marion Zioncheck, 34, Polish-born American politician (suicide)

== August 8, 1936 (Saturday) ==
- The French government changed its policy on the Spanish Civil War again, announcing that it was closing its border and stopping all further shipments of arms to Spain.
- Born: Frank Howard, baseball player, in Columbus, Ohio (d. 2023)

== August 9, 1936 (Sunday) ==
- The United States won gold in the men's 4 × 100 metres relay race, giving Jesse Owens his fourth gold medal of the Olympics.
- Died: Lincoln Steffens, 70, American journalist; William Alfred Webb, 58, American railroad executive

== August 10, 1936 (Monday) ==
- The Battle of Mérida began.
- Edward VIII left Šibenik on a cruise of the Adriatic Sea. Wallis Simpson was among his guests, but the British press refrained from writing about their relationship.

== August 11, 1936 (Tuesday) ==
- The Battle of Mérida ended in Nationalist victory.
- Joachim von Ribbentrop was made the German ambassador to Britain.
- Ethel Barrymore announced her retirement from the stage.
- Born: Andre Dubus, writer, in Lake Charles, Louisiana (d. 1999); Bill Monbouquette, baseball player, in Medford, Massachusetts (d. 2015)

== August 12, 1936 (Wednesday) ==
- The first International Brigades volunteers arrived in Spain.
- The All India Students Federation was founded.
- Born: André Kolingba, 4th President of the Central African Republic, in Bangui (d. 2010)

== August 13, 1936 (Thursday) ==
- German pilots flew their first combat mission in Spain when two Junkers Ju 52 bombers attacked and damaged a Spanish cruiser.
- The World Jewish Congress approved a boycott of Nazi Germany.

== August 14, 1936 (Friday) ==
- Battle of Badajoz: Nationalist forces led by Juan Yagüe captured the walled city of Badajoz. Once inside a savage repression known as the Massacre of Badajoz began, making headlines around the world.
- Portugal accepted a French proposal for neutrality in the Spanish Civil War, an important step in the international nonintervention agreement France was seeking.
- President Roosevelt made one of his few foreign policy statements of the election campaign at Chautauqua Institution in Chautauqua, New York. "We shun political commitments which might entangle us in foreign wars", the President said. "We avoid connection with the political activities of the League of Nations ... I hate war. I have passed unnumbered hours, I shall pass unnumbered hours, thinking and planning how war may be kept from this Nation." This is remembered as the "I Hate War" speech.
- Died: Rainey Bethea, 27?, American convicted criminal, last person to be publicly executed in the United States (hanged)

== August 15, 1936 (Saturday) ==
- The Battle of Almendrajelo ended in a Nationalist victory followed by a massacre. The Nationalists killed about 1,000 civilians.
- Stanley Baldwin announced a British embargo of arms to Spain.
- Italy won gold in football at the Berlin Olympics.
- Father Charles Coughlin endorsed third-party candidate William Lemke of the Union Party for President of the United States.
- Died: Grazia Deledda, 64, Italian writer and Nobel laureate

== August 16, 1936 (Sunday) ==
- The Siege of Gijón ended in Republican victory.
- The closing ceremony of the Summer Olympics was held. Germany won the medal count with 33 gold medals and 89 total.
- The amphibious landing known as the Battle of Majorca began.
- The French village of Biriatou on the Spanish border was bombed by a rebel plane in an apparent accident. No one was injured.

== August 17, 1936 (Monday) ==
- The Battle of the Sierra Guadalupe began.
- A general election was held in Quebec, Canada. 39 consecutive years in power for the Quebec Liberal Party were ended in favour of the new Union Nationale led by Maurice Duplessis.

== August 18, 1936 (Tuesday) ==
- The German merchant ship Kamerun was stopped by a shot across its bow and searched by a Spanish warship. Kamerun was forbidden to enter any Spanish port on the grounds of carrying oil and other war materials.
- Joe Louis knocked out Jack Sharkey in the third round in front of 29,331 at Yankee Stadium. It was Sharkey's final match.
- Born: Robert Redford, actor and filmmaker, in Santa Monica, California (d. 2025)

== August 19, 1936 (Wednesday) ==
- Moscow Trials: The first of the three show trials known as the Trial of the Sixteen began in the Soviet Union.
- The Republicans launched the Córdoba offensive.
- The Battle of Irún began.
- Died: Federico García Lorca, 38, Spanish poet (shot by Nationalist forces)

== August 20, 1936 (Thursday) ==
- Due to the Kamerun incident, Germany ordered its warships to meet "unjustifiable acts of force" with force of its own to ensure German freedom of the seas.
- The film Romeo and Juliet, based on the William Shakespeare play of the same name and starring Leslie Howard and Norma Shearer, was released.

== August 21, 1936 (Friday) ==
- Italy accepted a French proposal to pursue a policy of Non-intervention in the Spanish Civil War.
- Britain announced a similar policy to Germany's, warning that any attempt to interfere with British shipping in Spanish waters would be met with stern measures.
- Born: Wilt Chamberlain, basketball player, in Philadelphia, Pennsylvania (d. 1999)

== August 22, 1936 (Saturday) ==
- The Córdoba offensive ended in Republican failure.
- Died: Floyd B. Olson, 44, 22nd Governor of Minnesota (stomach cancer)

== August 23, 1936 (Sunday) ==
- The Soviet Union announced acceptance of the French non-intervention plan.
- 17-year old Bob Feller of the Cleveland Indians became the youngest player to pitch a complete game victory in the major leagues, defeating the St. Louis Browns 4-1. Feller struck out 15 batters.

== August 24, 1936 (Monday) ==
- The Trial of the Sixteen ended with all the defendants sentenced to death by firing squad.
- Eoin O'Duffy announced the formation of the Irish Brigade to fight for the Nationalist side in Spain.
- Nazi Germany increased the duration of compulsory military service from one year to two.
- Born: Kenny Guinn, businessman, politician and professor, in Garland, Arkansas (d. 2010)

== August 25, 1936 (Tuesday) ==
- The sixteen convicted Soviet conspirators were executed by firing squad. From exile in Norway, Leon Trotsky declared it was his duty to avenge "one of the greatest crimes in the world's history."
- Born: Hugh Hudson, British film director, in London (d. 2023); Giridharilal Kedia, social entrepreneur, in Cuttack, British India (d. 2009)
- Died: Lev Kamenev, 53, Soviet politician (executed); Ivan Smirnov (politician), 54 or 55, Russian communist (executed); Grigory Zinoviev, 52, Soviet politician (executed)

== August 26, 1936 (Wednesday) ==
- The Anglo-Egyptian treaty was signed. Britain recognized Egyptian independence and agreed to withdraw all troops from Egypt except those required to defend the Suez Canal.
- The BBC broadcast its first television programme, a variety show called Here's Looking at You.
- Conscription was introduced in Nationalist-held parts of Spain.
- Shells from a Nationalist attack on Irun fell on the French side of the border. French authorities advised peasants to evacuate the area.

== August 27, 1936 (Thursday) ==
- Britain and France asked 17 nations to declare arms embargoes against Spain.
- The musical comedy film Swing Time starring Fred Astaire and Ginger Rogers premiered in New York City.
- Died: George Dern, 63, American politician and businessman

== August 28, 1936 (Friday) ==
- The Battle of Monte Pelado was fought, resulting in Republican victory.
- Nationalist forces bombed Madrid for the first time.
- German War Minister Werner von Blomberg approved the deployment of combat aircraft in Spain.
- Italy prohibited the export of munitions to Spain.
- Derbyshire won the County Championship of cricket for the first time since 1874.

== August 29, 1936 (Saturday) ==
- The Soviet government demanded that Norway expel Trotsky, accusing him of breaking his pledge to not engage in counter-revolutionary activities.
- Nationalists captured Oropesa.
- The (Nationalist) Spanish State proclaimed that the pre-Republican red and gold bicolour flag would be displayed in Nationalist-held territory.
- Born: John McCain, politician and 2008 U.S. presidential candidate, in the Panama Canal Zone (d. 2018)

== August 30, 1936 (Sunday) ==
- The Chicago Tribune published Jay Allen's famous account of the Massacre of Badajoz. "Eighteen hundred men – there were women too – were mowed down there in some twelve hours", Allen reported. "There is more blood than you would think in 1,800 bodies."
- The destroyer USS Kane which was in Spanish waters assisting in the evacuation of American nationals, was attacked by an unidentified aircraft. A total of six bombs were dropped which landed near the ship but did no damage, and the Kane replied with anti-aircraft fire in the direction of the plane. The United States sent protests to both sides in the civil war. The U.S. State Department said the altercation was probably a case of mistaken identity, even though the Kane was clearly flying the American flag.
- The Queen Mary crossed the Atlantic Ocean in a record time of 3 days, 23 hours and 57 minutes to claim the Blue Riband.
- The head of Thomas Jefferson on the Mount Rushmore sculpture was dedicated in a ceremony attended by President Roosevelt.
- Died: Carlos José Solórzano, 76, President of Nicaragua 1925–26

== August 31, 1936 (Monday) ==
- A Nationalist radio broadcast from Seville announced that 67 miners at Rio Tinto had been executed for supplying Republican forces with munitions.
- The Battle of the Sierra Guadalupe ended in a tactical Nationalist victory.
- An explosion at a mine in Bochum, Germany killed 29.
- Radio Prague was launched.
