= September 1936 =

Month of 1936

<<	September 1936					>>
Su	Mo	Tu	We	Th	Fr	Sa
		1	2	3	4	5
6	7	8	9	10	11	12
13	14	15	16	17	18	19
20	21	22	23	24	25	26
27	28	29	30

The following events occurred in September 1936:

== September 1, 1936 (Tuesday) ==
- Republican forces bombed Burgos for the first time. Nationalists protested to the International Red Cross in Geneva that a hospital was bombed despite clearly displaying the Red Cross insignia.
- The first Edward VIII postage stamps were issued.
- Central Police University was established in Nanjing, China.

== September 2, 1936 (Wednesday) ==
- L'Osservatore Romano criticized recent remarks by Father Charles Coughlin's that called President Roosevelt a liar. "The Holy See wishes to respect all liberties and all conveniences", the editorial said. "It is extremely notable that an orator offends when he inveighs against persons who represent supreme social authority, with the evident danger of disturbing the respect due the authorities themselves by the people."

== September 3, 1936 (Thursday) ==
- The Battle of Talavera de la Reina was fought, resulting in a Nationalist victory.
- President Franklin D. Roosevelt met with six state governors, including rival presidential candidate Alf Landon, at the Iowa State Capitol in Des Moines to discuss government actions in response to the drought.
- Lou Ambers won the World Lightweight Championship of boxing by 15-round decision over Tony Canzoneri in Madison Square Garden.
- Born: Zine El Abidine Ben Ali, Tunisian politician, 2nd President of Tunisia, in Hammam Sousse (d. 2019)

== September 4, 1936 (Friday) ==
- Francisco Largo Caballero became the 66th Prime Minister of Spain. An announcement explained that "because of the length of the civil war, the government believed it advisable to resign to make way for a government embracing all parties comprising the Popular Front."
- The Battle of Irún ended with the Nationalist capture of the city.
- In Paris, 100,000 pro-Republican demonstrators held a march calling on the French government to lift its arms embargo against Spain.

== September 5, 1936 (Saturday) ==
- Nationalists drove back a Republican counterattack on Irún.
- The Battle of Cerro Muriano began.
- Beryl Markham completed the first east-to-west transatlantic solo flight by a woman. Due to bad weather eating up her fuel supply she had to make a forced landing at Baleine Cove, Nova Scotia short of her goal of New York. The plane landed in the mud and took significant damage but Markham only sustained a cut to the forehead.
- 8 spectators were killed in the ninth annual Tourist Trophy Race in Northern Ireland when driver Jack Chambers lost control of his Riley on the wet track and crashed into the crowd. The race was never held again.
- This is the purported date that the famous photograph The Falling Soldier was taken by Robert Capa during the Spanish Civil War, although the authenticity of the photo has been called into question.
- Born: Bill Mazeroski, baseball player, in Wheeling, West Virginia (d. 2026)

== September 6, 1936 (Sunday) ==
- 15 Jews were injured in anti-Jewish and anti-Socialist rioting in Warsaw, Poland. Socialists paraded in the streets demanding help for the government of Spain until they were attacked by congregation members getting out of church where special prayers had been held for Spanish Catholics.
- The Battle of Cerro Muriano ended in Nationalist victory.
- President Roosevelt gave a fireside chat on the subject of drought conditions.
- The comedy-drama film My Man Godfrey starring William Powell and Carole Lombard was released.

== September 7, 1936 (Monday) ==
- The British colonial office announced the appointment of John Dill as General officer commanding British forces in Palestine.
- The last known Tasmanian tiger died at Hobart Zoo.
- Born: Buddy Holly, rock and roll musician, in Lubbock, Texas (d. 1959)
- Born: George Cassidy, jazz musician and music teacher, in Belfast, Northern Ireland (d. 2023)
- Died: Kenneth Robert Balfour, 72 or 73, British politician

== September 8, 1936 (Tuesday) ==
- A revolt within the Portuguese Navy was put down. Two mutinous ships tried to steam out of Lisbon for an unknown destination until they were disabled by an artillery bombardment. 6 crew were killed and the rest were taken into custody.
- The 8th Nazi Party Congress opened in Nuremberg. Hitler opened the proceedings with a three-minute address proclaiming that he had "restored full arms sovereignty to the nation."
- Prince Bernhard of Lippe-Biesterfeld and Crown Princess Juliana of the Netherlands announced their engagement.

== September 9, 1936 (Wednesday) ==
- Hitler gave an 8,500-word address before 800,000 Nazis on the subject of authority, which he called "the foundation of all harmony". Unlimited individual liberty, Hitler asserted, led to anarchy. Following the speech, a proclamation outlined Nazi Germany's next goal as the restoration of its pre-war colonies and rebuilding its economy through a four-year plan.
- Franco-Syrian Treaty of Independence: The French and Syrian governments signed a treaty of alliance and friendship. The pact provided for the French mandate over Syria to end within three years and for Syria to join the League of Nations.
- An international conference for non-intervention in the Spanish Civil War opened in London.
- Aleksandr Mikhailovich Orlov of the NKVD arrived in Spain to oversee the transfer of funds from the Spanish treasury to Moscow. This money would come to be known as Moscow gold.
- Belgian Prime Minister Paul van Zeeland gave a radio address explaining that the world was splitting up between left-wing and right-wing extremists, and the only way to prevent a split within Belgium was to pursue a policy of complete neutrality. This speech signalled a shift in Belgian foreign policy to avoid any kind of alliances that could draw the country into a war.
- The New York Yankees clinched the American League pennant by sweeping a doubleheader against the Cleveland Indians, 11-3 and 12-9.
- The excursion steamship Romance collided with the steamer New York in a fog near Boston Harbor. The Romance sank in less than twenty minutes but the New York was able to rescue all passengers and crew aboard and return to Boston Harbor despite a 12-foot hole in the bow.
- Born: David Gold, businessman, in Stepney, London, England (d. 2023)

== September 10, 1936 (Thursday) ==
- A massive landslide in the Himalayas wiped out seven villages and left hundreds reported dead.
- Nationalist artillery resumed pounding San Sebastián after a 48-hour unofficial truce.
- The British Trades Union Congress voted in favour of a policy of neutrality in the Spanish Civil War, due to fear that intervention in the conflict would spark a larger war in Europe.
- Germany launched a propaganda campaign against Czechoslovakia, accusing the country of harbouring Soviet aircraft and providing airfields to the Soviet air force.
- The first official Speedway World Championship motorcycle race was held at Wembley Stadium in London, won by Lionel Van Praag of Australia.

== September 11, 1936 (Friday) ==
- As part of ceremonies at the World Power Conference, President Roosevelt pressed a golden key in Washington, D.C. to put a small 3,500 horsepower generator into service for Boulder Dam and Boulder City, Nevada.
- The Supreme Electoral Council, the predecessor of the National Electoral Council of Venezuela, was founded.
- The musical play Careless Rapture by Ivor Novello and Christopher Hassall premiered at the Theatre Royal, Drury Lane in London.
- Born: Charles Dierkop, actor, in La Crosse, Wisconsin (d. 2024)

== September 12, 1936 (Saturday) ==
- The Nationalists captured San Sebastián to win complete control of the Basque region.
- The Battle of Mallorca ended in Nationalist victory. The Italian occupation of Mallorca began.
- Fred Perry of the United Kingdom beat Don Budge in the men's singles final of the U.S. National Championships. Perry was the first foreigner to ever win the tennis championship.
- Rose Coyle of Philadelphia won the 10th Miss America pageant.
- Born: Guillermo Gómez Rivera, author, historian and linguistic scholar, in Iloilo City, Philippines

== September 13, 1936 (Sunday) ==
- Adolf Hitler reviewed 107,000 men of the SA and SS in Nuremberg.
- 17-year old Bob Feller of the Cleveland Indians struck out 17 Philadelphia Athletics, setting a new single-game American League record and tying the major league record set by Dizzy Dean in 1933.

== September 14, 1936 (Monday) ==
- The Siege of Santuario de Nuestra Señora de la Cabeza began.
- On the final day of the Nuremberg Rally, Hitler watched a flypast of 371 aircraft and gave a final speech assailing democracy as a "channel through which bolshevism spreads poison."
- George McMahon, the man who aimed a revolver at King Edward VIII in July, was sentenced to 12 months hard labour for "intent to alarm the king".
- Born: Walter Koenig, actor (Star Trek), in Chicago (d. 2026)
- Died: Lina Ódena, 25, Spanish communist and miliciana; Irving Thalberg, 37, American film producer

== September 15, 1936 (Tuesday) ==
- The German news agency published a message from Spanish Nationalist leader Miguel Cabanellas which stated: "The Spanish nation never will forget the friendship and moral support extended by Germany. Your leader and nation keep watch against bolshevism in the east. We will do the same in the west, where it is no less important in this decisive hour in European history."

== September 16, 1936 (Wednesday) ==
- António de Oliveira Salazar ordered the creation of the Portuguese Legion.
- The Nationalists captured Ronda.

== September 17, 1936 (Thursday) ==
- The first issue of the Barcelona newspaper Juventud Comunista (Communist Youth) was published.
- Died: Henry Louis Le Châtelier, 85, French chemist

== September 18, 1936 (Friday) ==
- 45 died on the Nile when a pleasure boat and a cargo ship collided.
- A tropical hurricane struck Cape Hatteras along the east coast of the United States, doing considerable damage.
- The USS Fanning was launched.
- Born: Big Tom, country musician, in Castleblayney, Ireland (d. 2018)

== September 19, 1936 (Saturday) ==
- Nazi authorities ordered all German churches to eliminate the word "Hallelujah" from prayers because it was "Hebrew and alien."
- Born: Anna Karen, actress, in Durban, South Africa (d. 2022)
- Died: Vishnu Narayan Bhatkhande, 76, Indian musicologist; Tom Campbell Black, 36, English aviator (plane collision)

== September 20, 1936 (Sunday) ==
- A dynamite blast in Havana, Cuba demolished a newspaper press and a Catholic church and killed 4 people. 20 Socialists were arrested by police that day. It was believed that the newspaper was targeted because it ran editorials supporting the Nationalists in the Spanish Civil War.
- The Swedish general election was held. The Swedish Social Democratic Party maintained its plurality in the Riksdag.

== September 21, 1936 (Monday) ==
- The Nationalists took Maqueda after a three-day battle.
- The German military began its largest maneuvers since 1914.
- The 17th session of the League of Nations Assembly opened in Geneva. The Council wrestled with the question of whether Ethiopia should be allowed to keep its seat.
- Born: Yury Luzhkov, politician, in Moscow, USSR (d. 2019)
- Died: Frank Hornby, 73, English inventor, businessman and politician

== September 22, 1936 (Tuesday) ==
- Uruguay broke off diplomatic relations with Spain because of reported executions of three sisters of a Uruguayan diplomat.
- Benito Mussolini received Hitler Youth leader Baldur von Schirach in Rome. A special parade of visiting Hitler Youth was conducted in the Piazza Venezia.
- The Danish Landsting election was held.

== September 23, 1936 (Wednesday) ==
- The League of Nations Assembly voted 39-4 to allow Ethiopia to keep its seat, meaning that Haile Selassie's government continued to be recognized by the League as the legitimate authority of the country and not Italy. The dissenting votes were cast by Hungary, Austria, Albania and Ecuador.
- The Taminato incident occurred in the Shanghai International Settlement when gunmen shot and killed a Japanese sailor and wounded two others. That night, more than 2,000 Japanese troops occupied the Hongkou District under martial law to search for the men.

== September 24, 1936 (Thursday) ==
- The Republicans opened the Alberche Dam to thwart a Nationalist advance.
- Father Charles Coughlin increased his rhetoric against the Roosevelt Administration. Coughlin called the President "anti-God" and said he would advocate the use of bullets if an "upstart dictator" voided the ballot.
- The New York Giants made the 1936 World Series a Subway Series, clinching the National League pennant with a 2–1 win over the Boston Bees.
- Born: Jim Henson, puppeteer, filmmaker and television producer, in Greenville, Mississippi (d. 1990)
- Died: József Klekl, 57, Slovene writer and journalist

== September 25, 1936 (Friday) ==
- The French government decided to devalue the franc by one-quarter to one-third in order to stabilize the currency.
- At the League of Nations, Spanish delegate Julio Álvarez del Vayo said the European non-intervention agreement amounted to "a blockade of the lawful Spanish government" and said the war would have virtually been won already if the rebels had not received foreign aid. Álvarez del Vayo said "the bloodstained soil of Spain already is the battlefield of world war", and warned that future wars would not be fought between states but between two groups of ideas, those of "democracy and oppression."
- Born: Ken Forsse, creator of Teddy Ruxpin, in Bellwood, Nebraska (d. 2014); Moussa Traoré, 2nd President of Mali, in Kayes, French Sudan (d. 2020)
- Died: William Sims, 77, American admiral

== September 26, 1936 (Saturday) ==
- The Campaign of Gipuzkoa ended in Nationalist victory.
- Tensions decreased considerably in Shanghai when the Japanese withdrew most of their forces.
- Joseph Stalin appointed Nikolai Yezhov as the new head of the NKVD. Under Yezhov's direction the Great Purge would be widely expanded.
- As a result of the French devaluation, Switzerland announced it would devalue its own franc by 30%.
- The farce play Horse Eats Hat co-written and directed by Orson Welles premiered at the Maxine Elliott Theatre in New York City.
- Died: Harriet Monroe, 75, American editor, literary critic and poet

== September 27, 1936 (Sunday) ==
- The siege of the Alcázar ended when the Nationalists broke the siege.
- Switzerland and the Netherlands went off the gold standard.
- The EMLL 3rd Anniversary Show, commemorating the third anniversary of the professional wrestling promotion Empresa Mexicana de la Lucha Libre, was held in Mexico City.
- Born: Don Cornelius, television show host and producer, in Chicago (d. 2012); Joselo, actor and comedian, in Barbacoas, Aragua, Venezuela (d. 2013)

== September 28, 1936 (Monday) ==
- Per Albin Hansson became Prime Minister of Sweden for the second time.

== September 29, 1936 (Tuesday) ==
- The Battle of Cape Espartel was fought in the Strait of Gibraltar. The Nationalists were victorious and broke the Republican blockade of the strait.
- A declaration signed by Miguel Cabanellas was issued naming Francisco Franco "Chief of the Government of the Spanish State".
- Britain declared martial law in Palestine to fight the Arab revolt.
- Italy delivered a contingent of 13 tankettes to the Nationalists.
- During a speech in Syracuse, New York, President Roosevelt called communism "a false issue" in the presidential campaign and asked that "here and now we bury this red herring." Roosevelt maintained that his record showed "consistent adherence" to American democracy.
- Born: Silvio Berlusconi, media tycoon and three-time Prime Minister of Italy, in Milan (d. 2023)

== September 30, 1936 (Wednesday) ==
- Pinewood Studios opened in England.
- American journalists H. R. Ekins, reporter for the New York World-Telegram, Dorothy Kilgallen of the New York Journal and Leo Kieran of The New York Times start the race to travel around the world on commercial airline flights. The race takes 18 ½ days.
- Born: Wayne Walker, NFL player, in Boise, Idaho (d. 2017)
- Died: Friedrich Sixt von Armin, 84, German general
