= October 1936 =

Month of 1936

<<	October 1936					>>
Su	Mo	Tu	We	Th	Fr	Sa
				1	2	3
4	5	6	7	8	9	10
11	12	13	14	15	16	17
18	19	20	21	22	23	24
25	26	27	28	29	30	31

The following events occurred in October 1936:

== October 1, 1936 (Thursday) ==
- Francisco Franco was officially invested with the title of Chief of State in the throne room at Burgos. He made a short and simple speech vowing to "try to raise Spain to the place that corresponds to her history and her rank in earlier times."
- In Valencia, the Spanish Cortes met for the first time since July 19 and passed a law granting home rule to the Basque Country.
- Al Smith gave a nationally broadcast address in which he broke from the Democrats and endorsed Alf Landon for President of the United States.
- Juan Demóstenes Arosemena became President of Panama.
- Born: Duncan Edwards, footballer, in Dudley, Worcestershire, England (d. 1958)

== October 2, 1936 (Friday) ==
- In Austria, the Heimwehr expelled Emil Fey from its ranks and forbade other members of the organization from having any contact with him. Fey had been locked in a long rivalry with Ernst Rüdiger Starhemberg for control of the Heimwehr.
- The New York Yankees, playing the New York Giants, set the team record for most runs scored in a single World Series game with 18.
- Died: Juho Sunila, 61, two-time prime minister of Finland

== October 3, 1936 (Saturday) ==
- A typhoon in Japan left approximately 70 dead.
- Franco created a cabinet with three generals, a diplomat and his brother Nicolás.
- The earliest known public use of the term "fifth column" appeared in Mundo Obrero in an article by Dolores Ibárruri, who attributed the term to Emilio Mola.
- Collingwood defeated South Melbourne in the 40th Victorian Football League Grand Final.
- Aztec Bowl was dedicated on the San Diego State University campus in San Diego, California.
- Born: Steve Reich, minimalist composer, in New York City
- Died: John Heisman, 66, American football player and coach

== October 4, 1936 (Sunday) ==
- The Battle of Cable Street occurred in the East End of London when members of Oswald Mosley's British Union of Fascists clashed with anti-fascist demonstrators.
- 100,000 leftists marched in Paris in support of the Spanish Republic and fought in the streets with pro-Nationalists.

== October 5, 1936 (Monday) ==
- Italy devalued the lira and introduced various levies on capital.
- In Moscow, the USSR State Symphony Orchestra performed in public for the first time.
- Jarrow March: 200 Hunger marchers in Jarrow began their march to London. They carried a petition with 11,572 signatures asking for government help. The marchers hoped to draw attention to the 68 percent unemployment rate in the town
- Born: Václav Havel, writer, philosopher and 1st President of the Czech Republic, in Prague, Czechoslovakia (d. 2011)

== October 6, 1936 (Tuesday) ==
- The Regional Defence Council of Aragon was established in Spain.
- British Fascist leader Oswald Mosley and Diana Mitford were secretly married in Berlin in a ceremony attended by Adolf Hitler.
- Kálmán Darányi became Prime Minister of Hungary.
- The New York Yankees won the World Series with a 13–5 win over the New York Giants in Game 6.

== October 7, 1936 (Wednesday) ==
- The Soviet Union issued an ultimatum threatening to take active involvement in the Spanish Civil War unless Portugal, Italy and Germany stopped aiding the Nationalists.
- German Panzer troops arrived in Spain to train Nationalist forces with tanks and AT guns.
- José Antonio Aguirre became the 1st President of the Basque Country.
- Kyösti Kallio became Prime Minister of Finland.
- The Cole Porter musical Red, Hot and Blue opened at the Colonial Theatre in Boston for a pre-Broadway run ahead of its October 29 premiere at the Alvin Theatre.
- Born: Fereydoun Farrokhzad, entertainer, in Tehran, Iran (d. 1992)

== October 8, 1936 (Thursday) ==
- Germany fired back at the Soviet Union, saying that it was "hardly sincere" that Russia would "accuse other states of doing what it itself has long been doing." Germany denied sending airplanes or other military supplies to Spain.
- The first episode of the British television programme Picture Page was broadcast.
- Died: Red Ames, 54, American baseball player; Cheiro, 69, Irish astrologer; William Henry Stark, 85, American industrial leader

== October 9, 1936 (Friday) ==
- The European committee on neutrality in the Spanish Civil War met in London with representatives of 27 nations present. Many accusations were flung back and forth but no concrete proposals on how to resolve them were offered, and the meeting adjourned with no date set for another meeting.
- 650 fighters of the International Brigades arrived at Alicante.
- Boulder Dam began generating electricity.
- Born: Brian Blessed, actor, in Mexborough, England
- Died: Friedrich von Oppeln-Bronikowski, 63, German writer and translator

== October 10, 1936 (Saturday) ==
- The Heimwehr was dissolved and absorbed by the Fatherland Front.
- The Italian cabinet adopted Mussolini's recommendations for new national defense measures, most notably establishing a new work schedule for producers of war materials that increased the work week from 40 hours to 60.
- At least 310 people were killed by a typhoon that struck Luzon in the Philippines over the past two days.
- The London Gazette announced that women over 18 could be employed filling three inch mortar bombs. It was first time since the Great War that British women could work in munitions factories.
- The Reich Central Office for the Combating of Homosexuality and Abortion was created in Nazi Germany.

== October 11, 1936 (Sunday) ==
- The Arab Higher Committee announced an end to the 175-day-old Palestinian general strike.
- 200 fascists instigated a new wave of violence in London's East End, attacking Jews and smashing and looting the windows of Jewish shops until they were dispersed by police.
- 10,000 leftists participated in an anti-Fascist demonstration in Victoria Park, London, with 5,000 police on hand. 50 Fascist youths attempted a rush to snatch a red flag and some people were slashed with razors.
- Born: Larry Staverman, basketball player and coach, in Newport, Kentucky (d. 2007)

== October 12, 1936 (Monday) ==
- A shipment of 50 T-26 tanks and some BA-3 armoured cars from the Soviet Union arrived in Cartagena to aid the Spanish Republic.
- Cross-channel train ferry service began between Dover and Dunkirk. The service made it possible to ride in the same sleeping car from London all the way to Paris.
- Died: Félia Litvinne, 76, Russian-born French dramatic soprano

== October 13, 1936 (Tuesday) ==
- Uruguay barred "common transgressors, rogues, drug fiends, vagabonds, customary drunks and persons expelled from other nations" from entering the country.
- The American general interest magazine Coronet was first published.
- Died: John H. Hill, African-American attorney, military officer, and school administrator, President of West Virginia State University (1894-1898) (b. 1852)

== October 14, 1936 (Wednesday) ==
- A divorce suit initiated by Wallis Simpson against her husband Ernest was set for October 27. "The case will not be defended", Mr. Simpson declared. "Beyond that I have no statement to make."
- Belgium withdrew from its treaty of mutual assistance with France due to France's failure to react to the German remilitarization of the Rhineland.
- Edward VIII made it known that he would not be continuing the tradition of the Royal Christmas Message started by his father.
- The musical film Dimples starring Shirley Temple was released.
- Born: Carrie Nye, actress, in Greenwood, Mississippi (d. 2006)

== October 15, 1936 (Thursday) ==
- The Battle of Sigüenza ended in a Nationalist victory.
- The British press observed an unofficial policy of self-censorship and refrained from publishing reports of Mrs. Simpson's divorce proceedings. In the United States the story was front-page news. The story was also reported freely in France, but the news was completely suppressed in Germany, Italy, Russia, Greece and the British Colonies.
- Jewish teachers were banned from public schools in Nazi Germany.
- The city of Toyonaka, Osaka was founded in Japan.

== October 16, 1936 (Friday) ==
- The Siege of Oviedo ended in Nationalist victory.
- Newspaper proprietor Lord Beaverbrook called on King Edward VIII and declared he would help enforce a voluntary media blackout on the king's relationship with Mrs. Simpson.
- Rumors of King Edward's relationship with Mrs. Simpson spread throughout England as the odds of Edward actually marrying her began to be weighed in the foreign press. American newspapers began disappearing from British newsstands without explanation. However, foreign magazines delivered to subscribers through the mail were arriving untouched.
- Paris went dark for one hour starting at 9:30 p.m. so a mock bombing raid could be conducted.
- Born: Gerardo Gandini, pianist and composer, in Buenos Aires, Argentina (d. 2013)
- Born: Andrei Chikatilo, Soviet serial killer (d. 1994)

== October 17, 1936 (Saturday) ==
- The Spanish Republic opened Albacete as the headquarters and training ground of the International Brigades.
- Died: Suzanne Bianchetti, 47, French film actress

== October 18, 1936 (Sunday) ==
- The Cansiglio earthquake in northeast Italy killed 19 people.
- Nationalists captured Illescas, Toledo.
- The Sunday Referee somewhat broke the self-censorship policy of the British press by writing that "within the last day or so rumors from abroad have grown that the king is to marry before next May. If that were so, postponement (of his coronation) would be inevitable."

== October 19, 1936 (Monday) ==
- Parliamentary elections were held in Norway. The Labour Party maintained its plurality.
- 60 were dead and 500 injured after five days of rioting between Hindus and Muslims in Bombay.
- New York World-Telegram reporter H.R. Ekins won a race against two other New York newspaper journalists to travel around the world on commercial airline flights. He accomplished the feat in 18 ½ days. His opponents were New York Evening Journal reporter Dorothy Kilgallen, who finished in second place, and New York Times reporter Leo Kieran. Despite Kilgallen's second-place finish, upon her return to New York, where she lived, many photographs of her were published in newspapers and magazines.
- Born: James Bevel, civil rights leader, in Itta Bena, Mississippi (d. 2008); Tony Lo Bianco, actor, in Brooklyn, New York (d. 2024)
- Died: Anne Sullivan, 70, American teacher of Helen Keller

== October 20, 1936 (Tuesday) ==
- Italian Foreign Minister Galeazzo Ciano arrived in Berlin for official talks with Germany.

== October 21, 1936 (Wednesday) ==
- Pan American inaugurated weekly passenger service between San Francisco and Manila via Honolulu.

== October 22, 1936 (Thursday) ==
- The Belgian Rexist Party announced its intention to march on Brussels in a conscious imitation of Mussolini's March on Rome in order to "sweep out the Paul van Zeeland government and its corruption" despite a government order banning the march. Van Zeeland made a national radio address that evening appealing for calm and announcing measures that amounted to martial law.
- General José Miaja was put in charge of the defence of Madrid.
- The British press continued to tiptoe around the Edward VIII abdication crisis. London publication The News Week wrote that "the effects of the unofficial censorship have been disastrous, giving the impression abroad that there is something to hide." The weekly publication Cavalcade, which had been running articles about the king and his friendship with Mrs. Simpson for weeks, ran a short notice of Simpson's divorce suit and mentioned that thousands of words had been published in the United States about it. The Manchester Guardian ran an article about the possibility of the king's coronation being postponed but avoided any direct explanation for why a postponement might take place.
- Dod Orsborne, captain of the Girl Pat was convicted and imprisoned of its theft, having caused a media sensation when it went missing.
- Died: James J. Couzens, 64, American politician

== October 23, 1936 (Friday) ==
- The Soviet Union informed the European committee of non-intervention in Spain that Russia would no longer be bound by the neutrality agreement. The note repeated the previous charge that Germany, Italy and Portugal had already violated the pact.
- Hitler ordered the Condor Legion to Spain to fight for the Nationalists.

== October 24, 1936 (Saturday) ==
- Portugal broke off diplomatic relations with the Spanish Republic.
- Born: David Nelson, actor, director and filmmaker, in New York City (d. 2011); Bill Wyman, bassist of The Rolling Stones, in Lewisham, London, England

== October 25, 1936 (Sunday) ==
- The alliance soon to be known as the Rome-Berlin Axis was formed when Germany and Italy agreed on a pact.
- The Rexist "March on Brussels" ended up as an embarrassment due to low turnout and rowdiness by those who did show up. Several hundred arrests were made and Rexist leader Léon Degrelle was taken into custody when he tried to address his followers, though he was soon released.
- 510 tons of "Moscow gold" departed Cartagena for Odessa.
- At a meeting of Okinawan martial arts masters in Showa Kaikan Hall, Naha, Okinawa, it was decided to officially rename Te (or 'Tang Hand', 唐手道) the traditional systems of martial arts on the island, to Karate (or 'Empty Hand', 空手道), as well as introduce the Karategi and standardising rules and techniques in Karate.
- Born: Martin Gilbert, historian, in London, England (d. 2015); Masako Nozawa, actress, in Tokyo, Japan
- Died: Robert Temple Emmet, 81, U.S. Army Colonel

== October 26, 1936 (Monday) ==
Stalin

- Joseph Stalin responded to rumors that he was dead by releasing a handwritten note that read: "I know from reports of the foreign press that I long ago abandoned this sinful world and moved into the other world. As one cannot doubt such foreign press dispatches unless he wants to be expelled from the list of civilized people, I request you to believe them and don't disturb me in the calm of the other world. With respect, J. Stalin."
- Born: Shelley Morrison, actress, in New York City (d. 2019)

== October 27, 1936 (Tuesday) ==
- A judge in Ipswich granted Wallis Simpson a divorce from her husband Ernest, on the grounds that he had been unfaithful. She would be free to marry again after six months. British newspaper The Manchester Guardian reported the story but buried it on page 10.

== October 28, 1936 (Wednesday) ==
- The prototype of the German heavy bomber Dornier Do 19 had its first flight.
- Born: Charlie Daniels, musician, in Leland, North Carolina (d. 2020)

== October 29, 1936 (Thursday) ==
- The Battle of Seseña was fought, resulting in Nationalist victory.
- The Iraqi coup d'état occurred.
- The Literary Digest published the final returns in its presidential election poll, projecting Alf Landon to beat President Franklin D. Roosevelt. Landon was forecast to carry 32 states worth 370 electoral votes, 104 more than required for election. The Literary Digest poll had correctly predicted the winner of every presidential election since 1920.
- In Rome, the destruction of the Spina of Borgo began to make way for the Via della Conciliazione.
- The Uptown Theater opened in Washington, D.C.
- The Kincardine Bridge was opened to road traffic, after nearly 3 years of construction.
- Born: Akiko Kojima, model, in Tokyo, Japan

== October 30, 1936 (Friday) ==
- The Condor Legion was created.
- The French cabinet and air ministry approved a plan to add 1,500 fighter planes to raise the size of its air force to 4,000.
- Antonita Arquès of the Spanish Republic won the 8th annual Miss Europe pageant.

== October 31, 1936 (Saturday) ==
- President Roosevelt made the Madison Square Garden speech, which included the famous line, "I welcome their hatred."
- The hunger marchers from Jarrow arrived in London.
- The Boy Scouts of the Philippines organization was founded.
- Born: Michael Landon, actor, writer, director and producer, in Queens, New York (d. 1991)
- Died: Deacon McGuire, 72, American baseball player, manager and coach
