= La sombra del iceberg =

2007 documentary

La Sombra del Iceberg (Spanish for The Shadow of the Iceberg) is a 2007 documentary film, that claims the photograph The Falling Soldier by Robert Capa was staged, and that Federico Borrell García was not the individual in the picture.

The documentary makes several claims:

- A 1937 Spanish anarchist publication claimed that Federico Borrell died behind a tree.
- A specialist in forensic science claimed after analyzing pictures of Borrell and pictures of the militiaman that he is not Federico Borrell García.
- In 1975 a journalist named Gallaher said that Capa told him that the picture was staged.
- An astronomical study concludes that the picture was taken at 9:00 a.m., not at 17:00. No battle happened at 9:00.
