= Siege of the Loyola barracks =

Coordinates: 43°18′36″N 1°57′58″W

- Part of the Spanish coup of July 1936
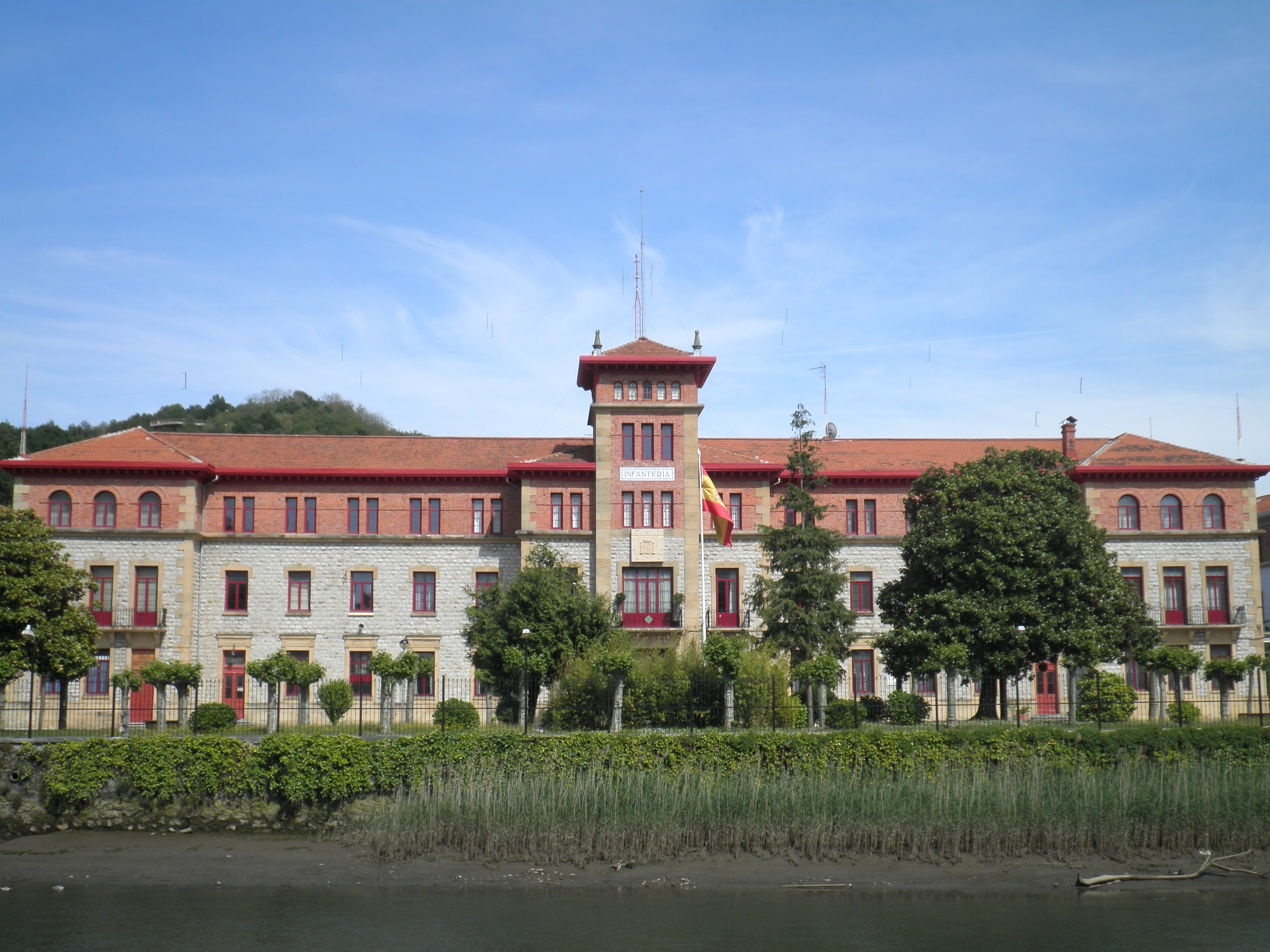
- Military barracks in Loyola
Date	19–27 July 1936
Location	Loyola, San Sebastián, Gipuzkoa, Spain
Result	Republican victory

Belligerents
Spanish Republic; Confederal militias	(Second Spanish Republic) Nationalist rebels

Commanders and leaders
Lt. Col. Augusto Pérez Garmendia; Lt. Col. Mauricio García Ezcurra	Col. León Carrasco Amilibia (surrendered) (executed); Lt. Col. José Vallespín Cobián

The siege of the Loyola barracks (Spanish: Sitio del Cuartel de Loyola) was a siege and uprising at the military barracks in the Loyola neighborhood of San Sebastián, Spain, on 21 July 1936. It was part of the Spanish coup of July 1936 against the Second Spanish Republic, which led to the start of the Spanish Civil War.

== Background ==
In the Basque province of Álava, the city of Vitoria was easily seized by the rebels led by the general Angel García Benitez and the Colonel Camilo Alonso Vega, but the rising failed in the Biscay and Gipuzkoa provinces.

The Basque nationalists supported the government, established Juntas de Defensa in all the cities and towns, arrested right-wing personalities, and requisitioned their automobiles. There was no military uprising in Bilbao. There was an unsuccessful uprising in San Sebastián, however.

== Uprising ==
On 19 July 1936, the military governor of San Sebastián, Colonel León Carrasco Amilibia, was arrested, but the commander of the Loyola barracks, Colonel José Vallespín Cobián, encouraged by Emilio Mola, decided to start the uprising against the government.

Vallespín pointed his cannons at the civil government, and the staff inside fled. Carrasco escaped from his captors and declared a state of war. Carrasco established himself with right-wing supporters in the María Cristina hotel, and the Civil Guard in the city supported the rising and seized the Gran Casino.

On 20 July, a column from Eibar, about 50 kilometres (30 mi) southeast of Loyola, led by Colonel Augusto Pérez Garmendia, came to the city and surrounded the buildings held by the rebels. On 23 July, the Republican forces occupied the María Cristina hotel, and on 27 July, the rebels in the Loyola barracks surrendered to the besieging forces. Spanish anarchists seized the weapons inside the barracks and shot some right-wing prisoners, worsening their relations with the Basque nationalists.

The nationalists occupied San Sebastián on 14 September.

== See also ==
- List of Spanish Republican military equipment of the Spanish Civil War
- List of Spanish Nationalist military equipment of the Spanish Civil War

== Bibliography ==
- Beevor, A. (2006). The Battle for Spain. London: Penguin. ISBN 9780143037651.
- Thomas, H. (2001). The Spanish Civil War. New York: Modern Library. ISBN 9780375755156.
