= Battle of Cerro Muriano =

1936 Spanish Civil War battle

Coordinates: 38°0′12″N 4°46′13″W

- Part of the Córdoba offensive, Spanish Civil War
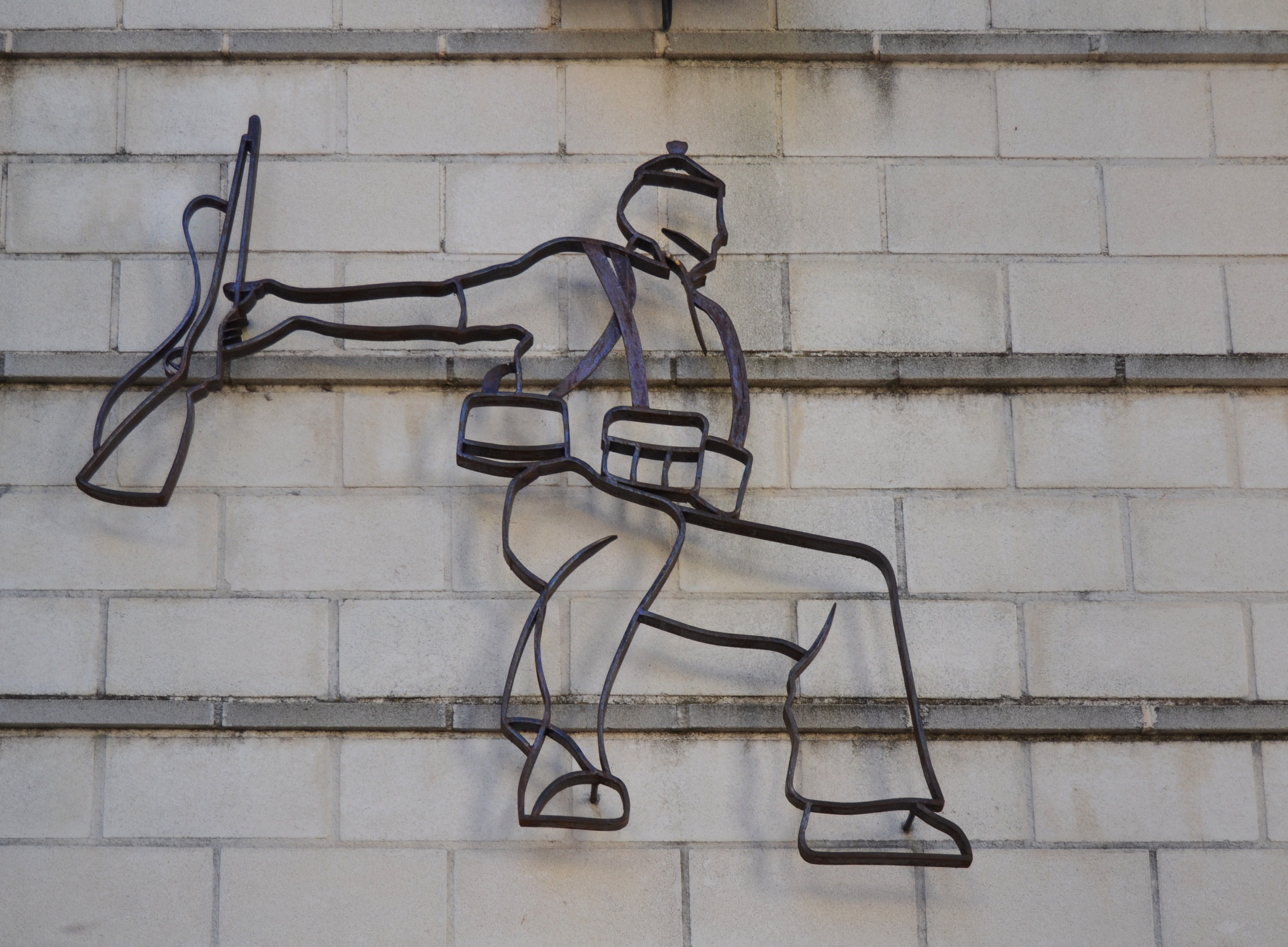
- A monument to the "Falling Soldier", Federico Borrell García "Taino", in his hometown of Benilloba
Date	5–6 September 1936
Location	Cerro Muriano, Córdoba, Spain
Result	Nationalist victory

Belligerents
(Spain) Spanish Republic	(Francoist Spain) Nationalist Spain

Commanders and leaders
José Miaja	José Enrique Varela

Casualties and losses
High	Minimal

The Battle of Cerro Muriano took place during the Spanish Civil War in 1936. The battle is perhaps most known today for the famous photograph, The Falling Soldier, that Robert Capa took during it.

== Location ==
Cerro Muriano is a village in Andalusia currently within the municipal terms of Córdoba and Obejo in the Province of Córdoba.

== History ==
The battle followed the August Córdoba offensive and lasted two days, 5 and 6 September 1936. After a 36-hour siege the Regulares and the Spanish Legion troops overran the Republican positions of the Columna Miaja leaving many dead.

The battle is famous owing to the picture of a "falling militiaman" taken by Robert Capa, a picture that sought to represent the tragic fate of the Spanish Republic.

== See also ==
- The Falling Soldier controversy
- List of Spanish Republican military equipment of the Spanish Civil War
- List of Spanish Nationalist military equipment of the Spanish Civil War
