= Malacky =

Malacky Malacka
- Municipality
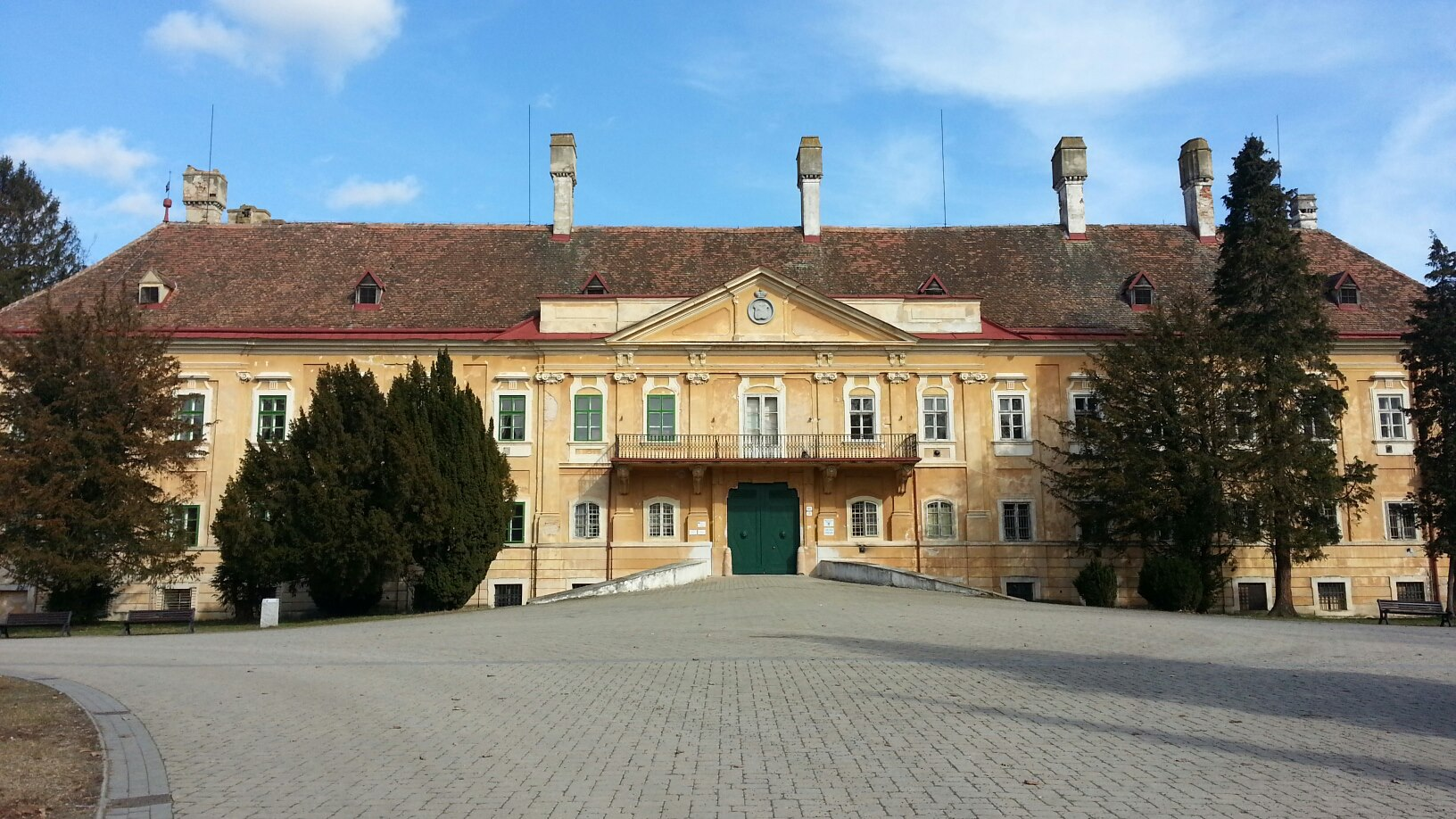
- Manor-house in Malacky

- Flag Coat of arms

- Location of Malacky in the Bratislava Region Location of Malacky in Slovakia
- Coordinates: 48.44°N 17.02°E
- Country: Slovakia
- Region: Bratislava Region
- District: Malacky District
- First mentioned: 1231

Government
  - Mayor: Juraj Říha

Area
  - Total: 23.20 km^{2} (8.96 sq mi)
- Elevation: 160 m (520 ft)

Population (2025)
  - Total: 18,742
- Time zone: UTC+1 (CET)
  - Summer (DST): UTC+2 (CEST)
- Postal code: 901 01
- Area code: +421 34
- Vehicle registration plate (until 2022): MA
- Website: malacky.sk

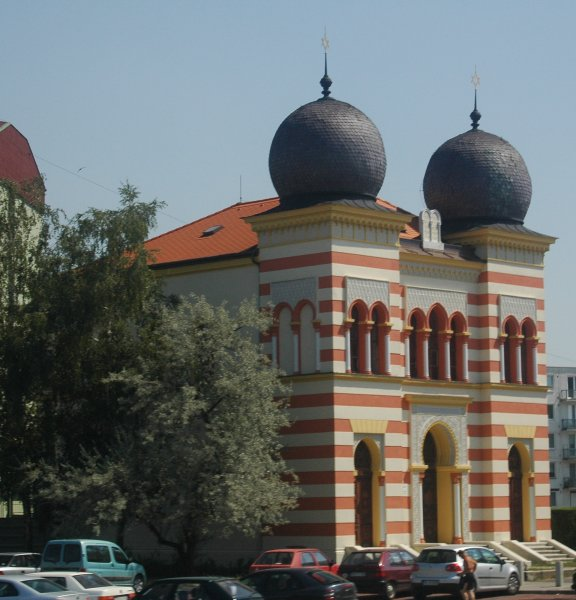
Synagogue in Malacky

Malacky (German: Malatzka, Hungarian: Malacka) is a town and municipality in western Slovakia around 35 kilometres (22 miles) north of Slovakia's capital, Bratislava. From the second half of the 10th century until 1918, it was part of the Kingdom of Hungary.

It is one of the key cities of the region "Záhorie", between the Little Carpathians in the east and Morava River in the west, and a cultural and economic hub for nearby villages such as Gajary, Kostolište, Veľké Leváre, and Jakubov. The town is located on the large Prague–Brno–Bratislava highway, and many residents commute daily to Bratislava. The Little Carpathians mountain range provides excellent opportunities for recreational activities like hiking or mountain biking, with its wide array of signposted trails.

== Geography ==
The municipality lies at an altitude of 160 metres (520 ft) and covers an area of 23.20 km^{2} (8.96 sq mi) (2025).

== Etymology ==
The origin of the name is uncertain. According to the first theory, the name refers to the Hungarian word malacka which means 'piglet' in Hungarian, and because the town seal features a pig. A drawback of this theory is that the Hungarian malacka is only a later borrowing from Slovenian and the name is older than the borrowing (Slovene mladec 'a young man', in wide meaning also 'a young animal'; Slovak equivalent is mládenec). Other theories derive the name from Slovak mláky 'fens, swamps' or mlátiť 'to flail, to smash' (with a phonetic development Mlaky > Malacky) or from the name of the Malina creek (recorded as Maliscapotoca).

== History ==
The name of the city was first mentioned in writing in 1206. During World War II, Malacky was captured on 5 April 1945 by troops of the Soviet 2nd Ukrainian Front.

== Famous buildings and sites ==
The most prominent sites in Malacky include the Franciscan church of the Immaculate Conception of Mary, the so-called "Pálffy Palace", and the renovated synagogue. The church includes a precise from 1653 of the so-called Holy Stairs (Scala Sancta) that Christ ascended to the Pretorium of Pilate. The Pálffy Palace until recently was used as a hospital and is currently unoccupied. It has recently been acquired by the local municipality. Located in the center of Malacky is also a large renovated synagogue built in 1886 in Moorish Revival style, which is now being used as a cultural center. Adjacent to it, there is a sports arena "MALINA" containing two indoor swimming pools (25 m and 12 m) and a multifunctional hall used for handball, basketball, volleyball, and indoor football.

== Economy ==
Swedspan, a subsidiary of IKEA, operates a large lumber plant just south of the city. Additionally, the Kuchyňa airbase, which is occasionally used by the US Air Force and other NATO air forces for training purposes, is located approximately 10 km (6 mi) east of the city.

In September 2008, Slovak National Party (SNS) President Ján Slota facilitated the erection of a large Slovak cross near Malacky as a demonstration of Slovak nationalism.

== Population ==
Population statistic (10 years)
Year	1995	2005	2015	2025
Count	17,984	17,847	17,253	18,742
Difference		−0.76%	−3.32%	+8.63%

Population statistic
Year	2024	2025
Count	18,810	18,742
Difference		−0.36%

It has a population of 18,742 people (31 December 2025).

=== Ethnicity ===
Census 2021 (1+ %)
Ethnicity	Number	Fraction
Slovak	17,005	89.8%
Not found out	1583	8.36%
Czech	262	1.38%
Total	18,935	

In year 2021 was 18,935 people by ethnicity 17,005 as Slovak, 1583 as Not found out, 262 as Czech, 119 as Hungarian, 72 as Other, 52 as Romani, 51 as Vietnamese, 36 as Serbian, 31 as Romanian, 29 as Ukrainian, 27 as Russian, 23 as Rusyn, 17 as Polish, 16 as German, 11 as Albanian, 9 as Italian, 8 as Chinese, 8 as Austrian, 8 as Moravian, 8 as Croatian, 6 as Bulgarian, 3 as English, 2 as Canadian, 1 as Jewish, 1 as Korean, 1 as Greek and 1 as French.

Note on population: The difference values of population numbers in the table "Population statistic" and in the sections "Ethnicity" & "Religion" is caused by the use of various statistical methods.

=== Religion ===
Census 2021 (1+ %)
Religion	Number	Fraction
Roman Catholic Church	9655	50.99%
None	6815	35.99%
Not found out	1582	8.35%
Evangelical Church	269	1.42%
Total	18,935	

In year 2021 was 18,935 people by religion 9655 from Roman Catholic Church, 6815 from None, 1582 from Not found out, 269 from Evangelical Church, 146 from Greek Catholic Church, 81 from Christian Congregations in Slovakia, 69 from Eastern Orthodox Church, 58 from Ad hoc movements, 46 from Other, 40 from Calvinist Church, 37 from Buddhism, 35 from Jehovah's Witnesses, 21 from Islam, 20 from Paganism and natural spirituality, 17 from Other and not ascertained christian church, 13 from Baptists Church, 8 from United Methodist Church, 7 from Old Catholic Church, 4 from Czechoslovak Hussite Church, 3 from Hinduism, 2 from Jewish community, 2 from Church of the Brethren, 2 from Seventh-day Adventist Church, 2 from Bahá'i Community and 1 from Apostolic Church.

Historical population
Year	Pop.	±%
1970	11,101	—
1980	15,218	+37.1%
1991	17,573	+15.5%
2001	17,773	+1.1%
2011	17,051	−4.1%
2021	18,935	+11.0%
Source: Censuses

According to the 2001 census, the town had 18,063 inhabitants. 96.68% of inhabitants were Slovaks, 1.02% Czechs and 0.51% Hungarians. The religious makeup was 70.35% Roman Catholics, 19.48% people with no religious affiliation, and 1.98% Lutherans.

According to the 1910 census, 75% were Slovaks.

== People ==
- István Friedrich, prime minister of Hungary for three months in 1919, was born here.
- Ernst Wiesner, a modern architect who designed buildings in Brno, was born here.
- Martin Benka, a Slovak painter and illustrator, was born near here and died here in 1971.
- Ádám Liszt, the father of composer and pianist Franz Liszt, was born here in 1776.
- Ivan Dérer, a Slovak politician, lawyer, and journalist, was born here in 1884.
- Ludwig Angerer, an Austrian photographer, was born here in 1827.
- Karol Machata, a Slovak actor, was born here in 1928.
- Štefan Lux, a Slovak Jewish journalist, was born here in 1888.
- Samuel Mráz (born 1997), footballer
- František Lukovský, a small business owner, who committed suicide in 2002 in front of the tax office using a self-made guillotine.

== Twin towns – sister cities ==
Malacky is twinned with:

- Veselí nad Moravou, Czech Republic
- Żnin, Poland (since 2001)
- Albertirsa, Hungary (since 2000)
- Szarvas, Hungary
- Gänserndorf, Austria
