= Ludwig Angerer =

Austrian photographer

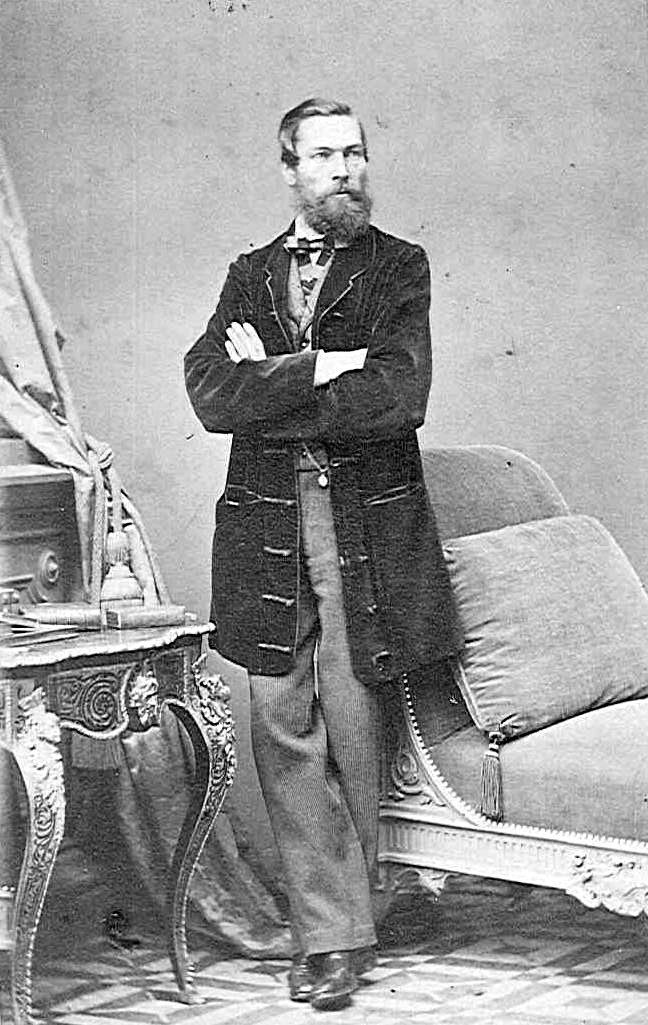
Ludwig Angerer. Photograph

Ludwig Angerer (August 15, 1827 – May 12, 1879) was an Austrian photographer who founded the first photo studio in Vienna and was appointed k.k. court photographer by Emperor Franz Joseph I. He is also known for taking some of the earliest photographs of Bucharest.

== Biography ==
Born in Malacka in the Habsburg Kingdom of Hungary (present-day Malacky, Slovakia), the son of a forester, Angerer studied pharmacy and chemistry at the Royal University of Pest. Starting 1848, for two years, he was a pharmacist apprentice, after which, at the age of 23, he gained a license in pharmacy, with the title of magister. Between 1850 and 1854, he worked as a pharmacist in Vienna and Graz.

On March 13, 1854, Angerer joined the army, becoming a military pharmacist at the Military Medicine Department and in 1856, he came to Bucharest with the Austrian occupation troops, working at the field hospital of the Austrian troops. During the two years he spent in Bucharest, apart from his pharmacist duties, during his spare time, Angerer practiced photography, taking some of the earliest photos of Bucharest, showing parts of the city before they were redeveloped during the late 19th century.

After the Austrian troops retreated in March 1857, Angerer returned to Vienna, where, a year later (on April 13, 1858), he resigned from the Army to focus on photography, opening his own studio. Just two years later, on December 24, 1860, he became the photographer of the Imperial Court in Vienna.

== Photos ==
=== Bucharest ===
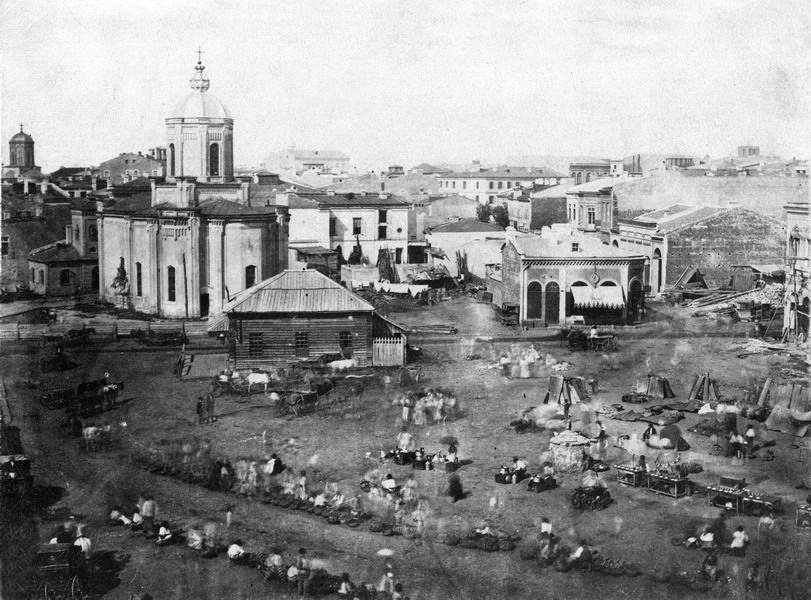
Bucharest flower market

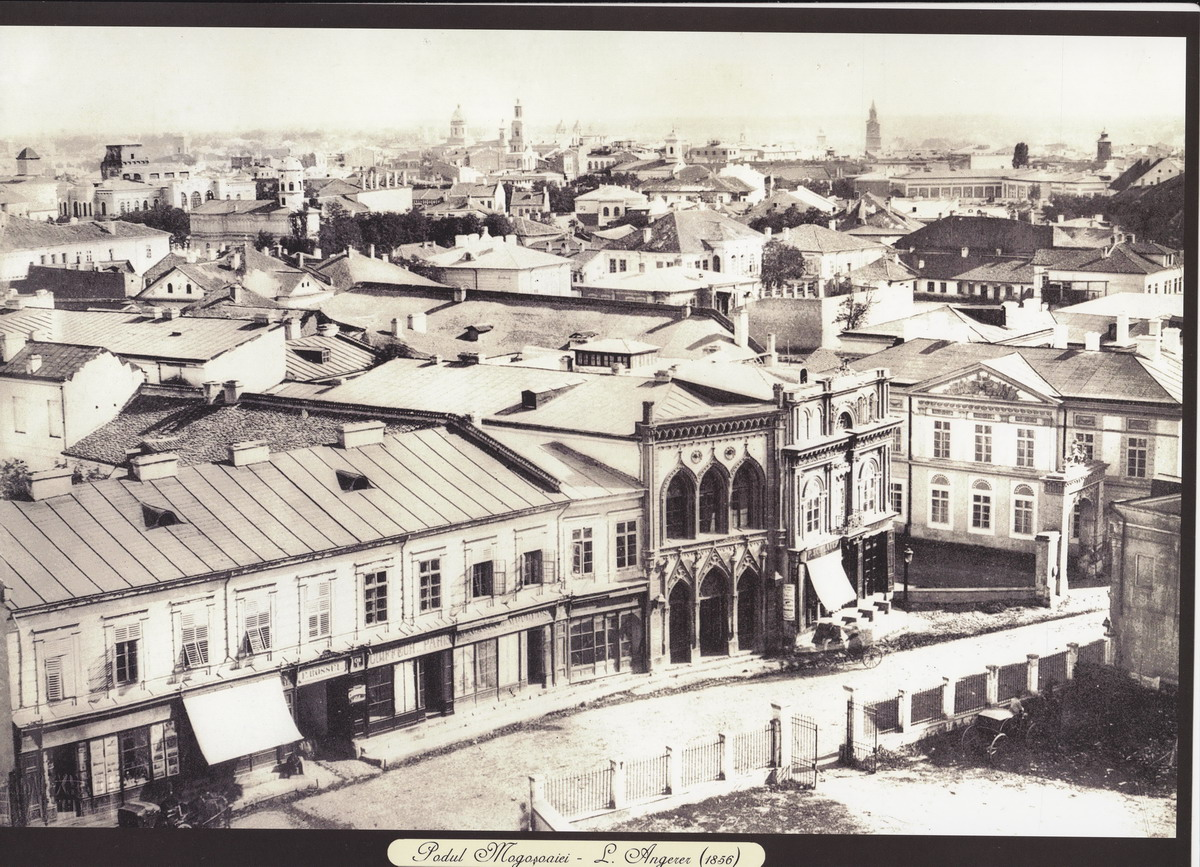
Podul Mogoșoaiei

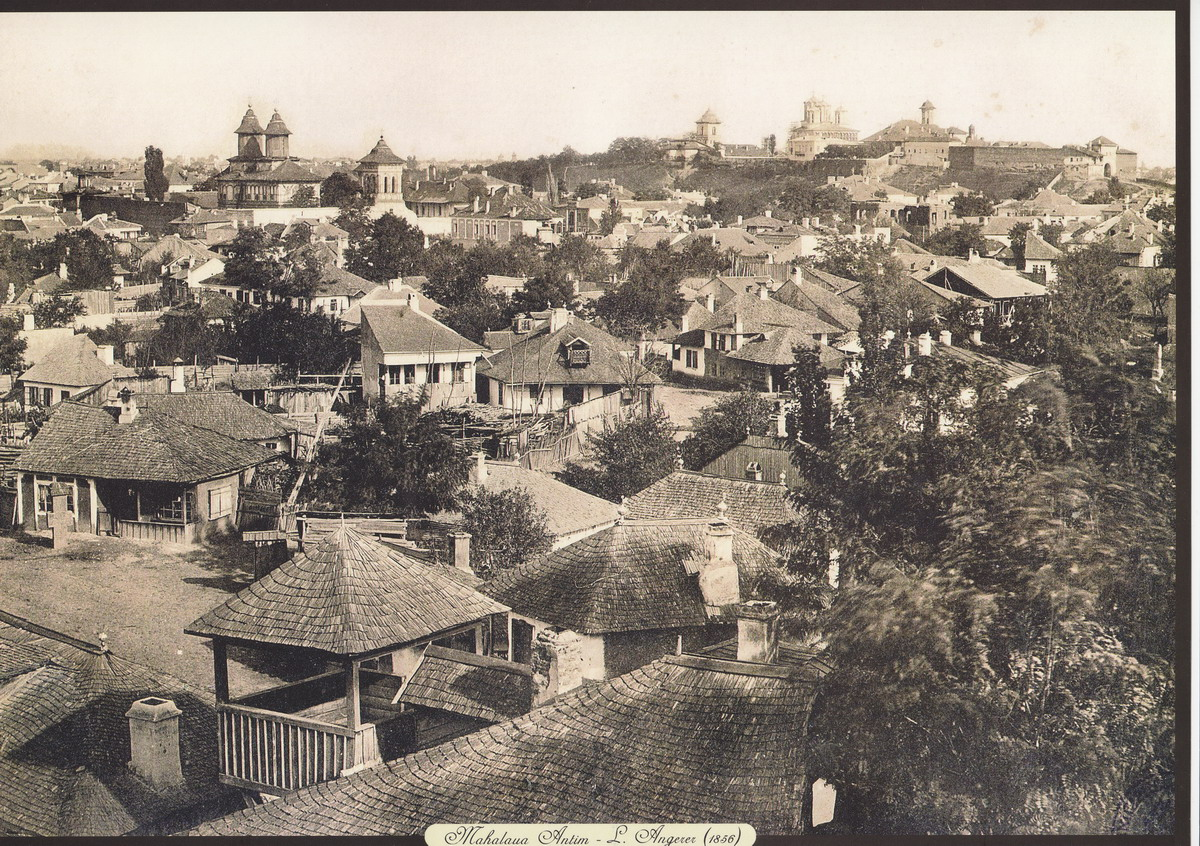
Antim Neighbourhood

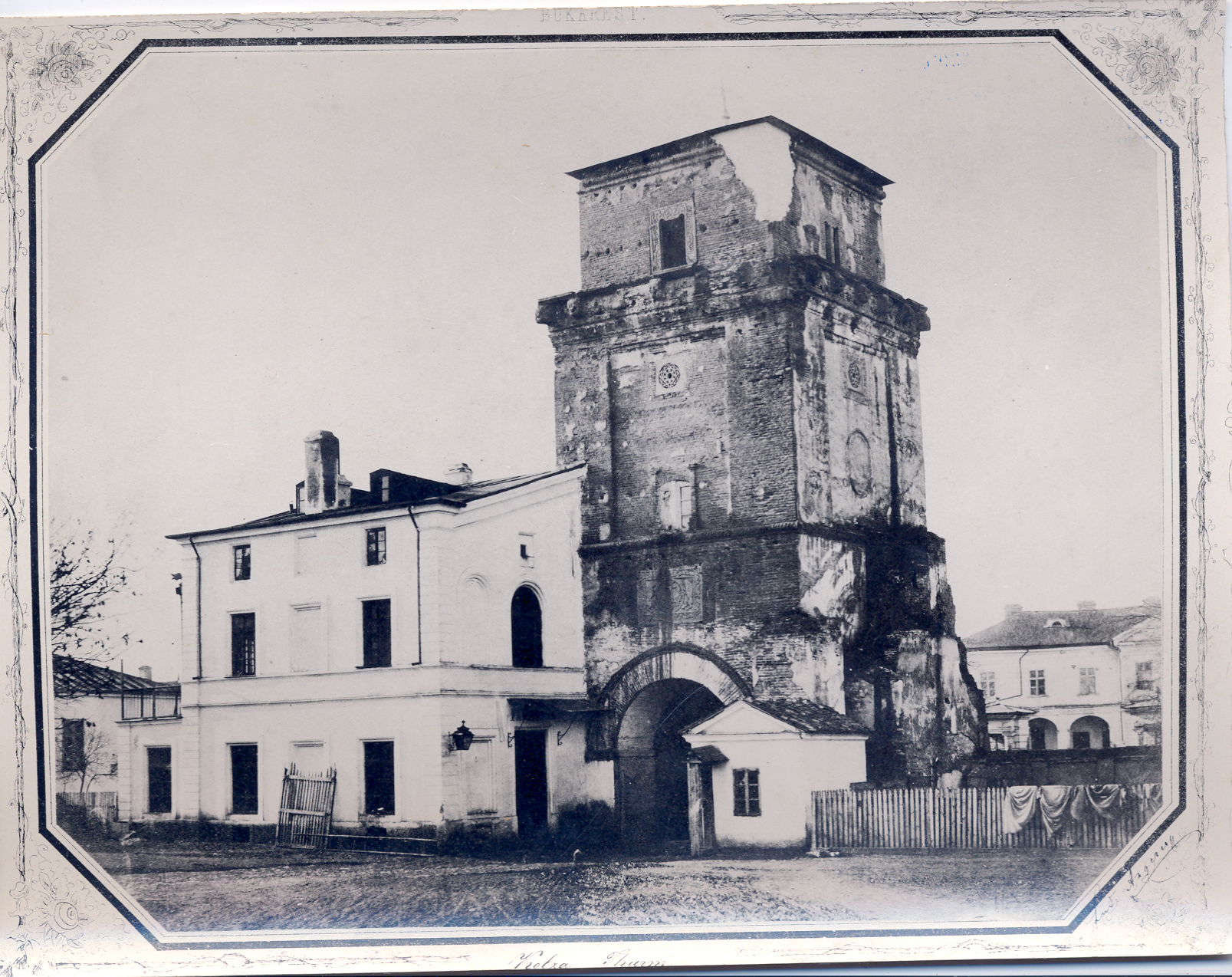
Colțea Tower

=== Portraits ===
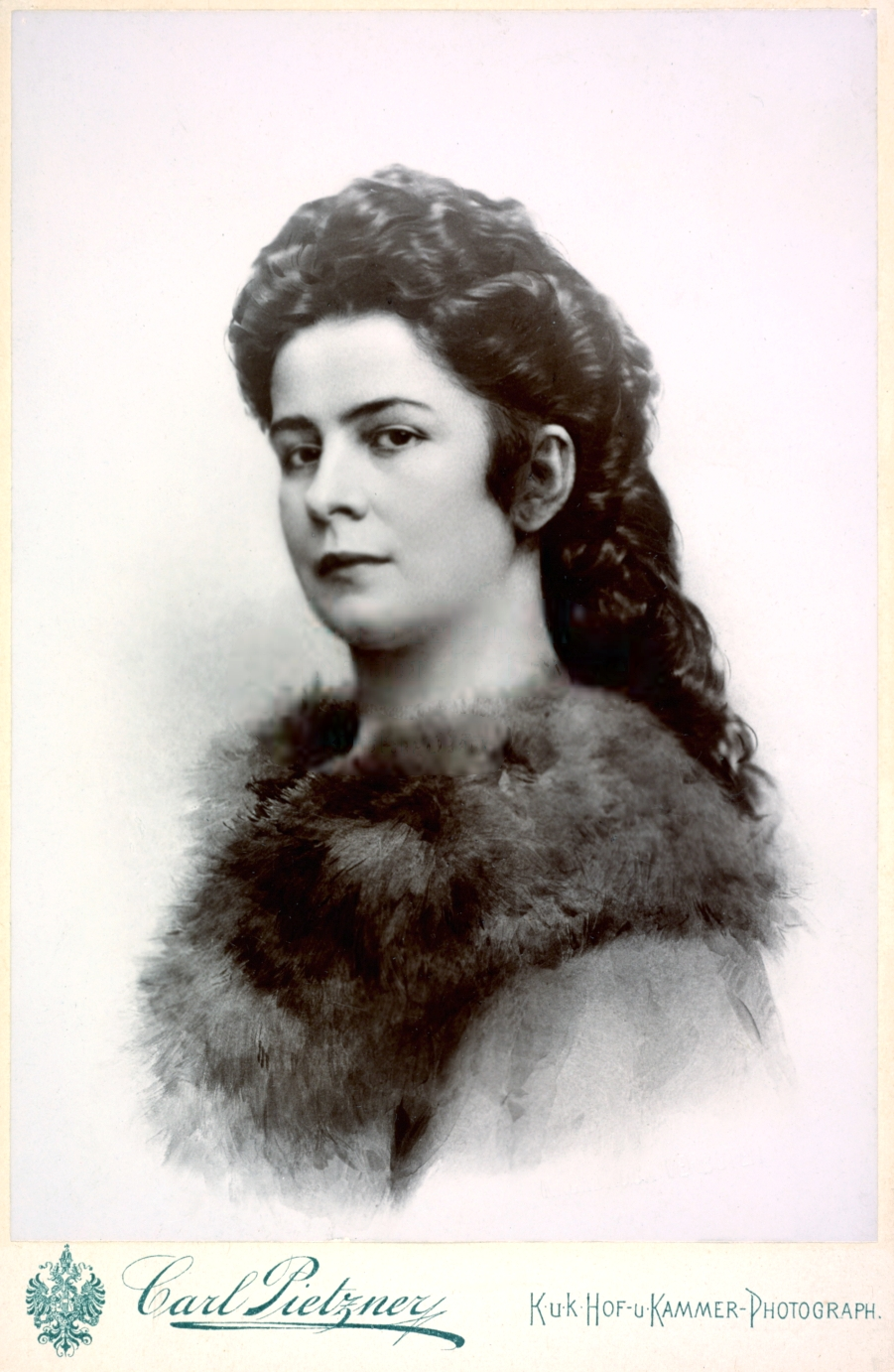
Empress Elisabeth of Austria

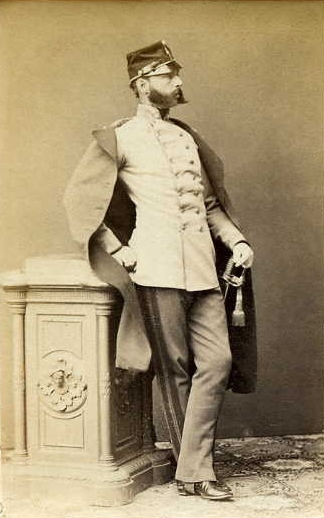
Franz Joseph

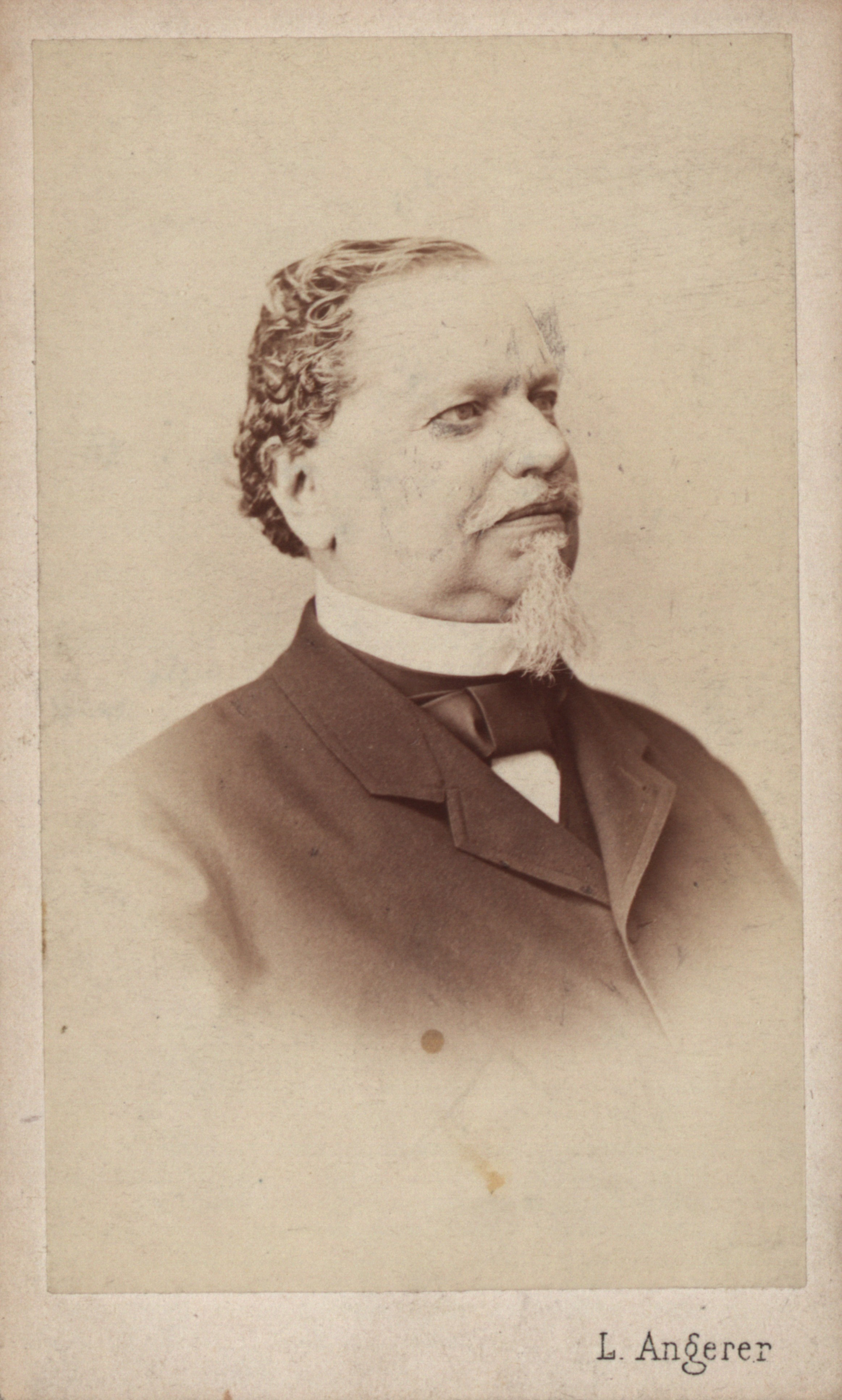
Simon Sinas

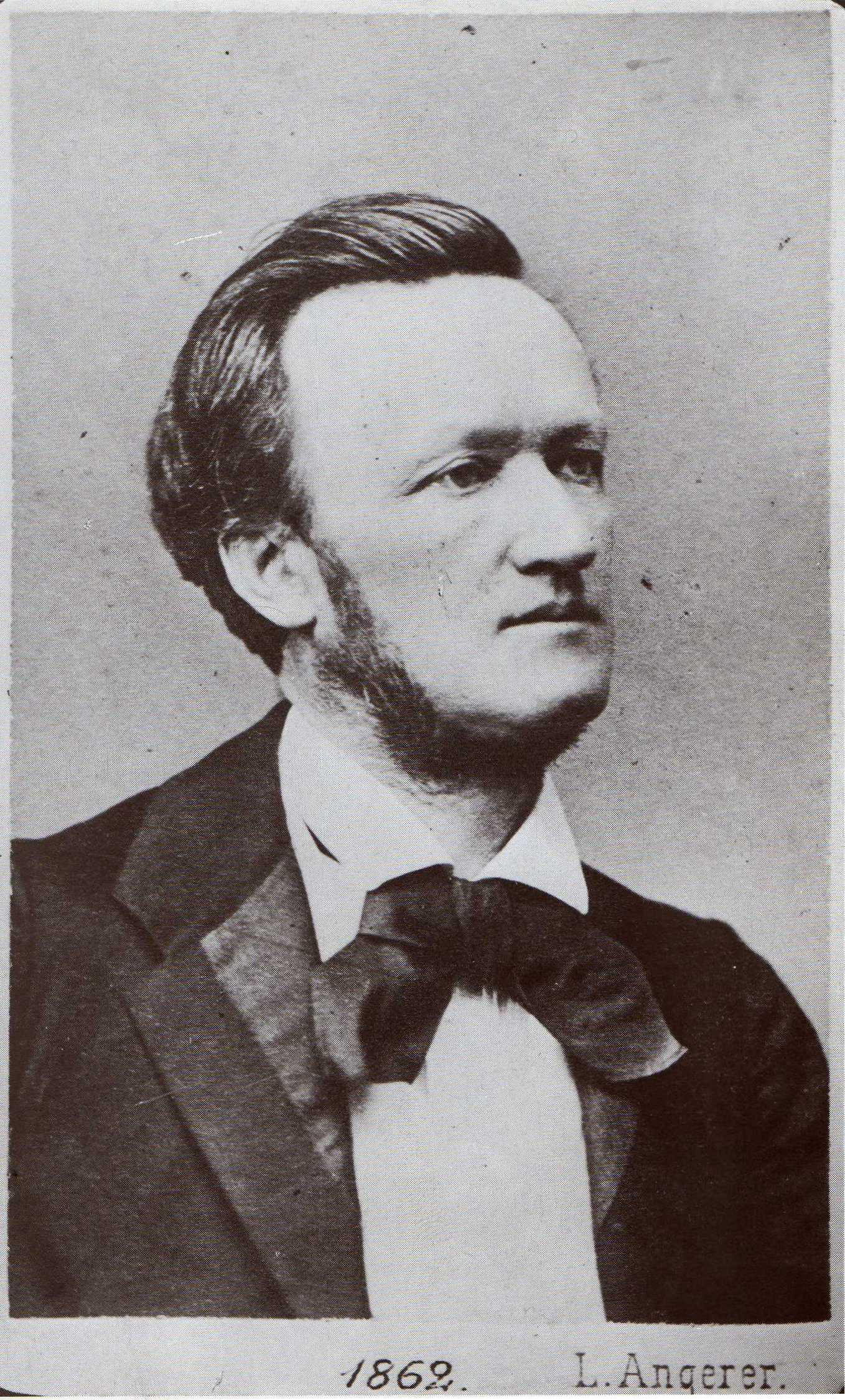
Richard Wagner
