= The Falling Soldier =

Photograph by Robert Capa

Original title Loyalist Militiaman at the Moment of Death, Cerro Muriano, September 5, 1936

The Falling Soldier (full title: Loyalist Militiaman at the Moment of Death, Cerro Muriano, September 5, 1936) is a black-and-white photograph by Robert Capa, claimed to have been taken on Saturday, September 5, 1936. It was said to depict the death of a Republican soldier from the Libertarian Youth (FIJL) during the Battle of Cerro Muriano of the Spanish Civil War. The soldier in the photograph was later claimed to be the anarchist militiaman Federico Borrell García.

The photo appears to capture a soldier at the very moment of his death. He is shown collapsing backward after being fatally shot in the head, with his rifle slipping out of his right hand. The soldier is dressed in civilian clothing, but is wearing a leather cartridge belt. Following its publication, the photograph was acclaimed as one of the greatest ever taken, but since the 1970s, there have been significant doubts about its authenticity due to its location, the identity of its subject, and the discovery of staged photographs taken at the same time and place.

== History ==
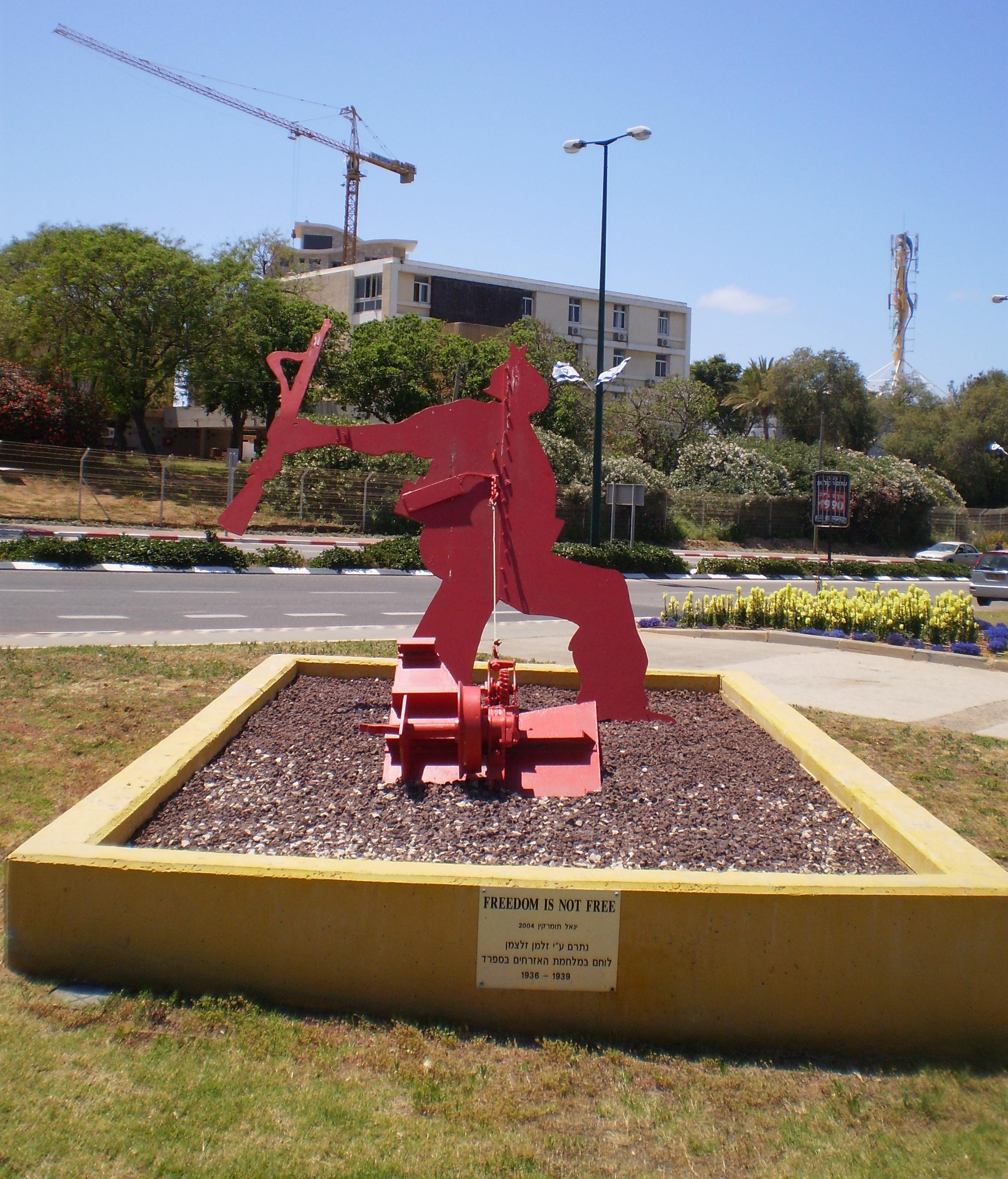
Freedom is not Free, a sculpture by Yigal Tumarkin, located in Netanya, Israel

Capa described how he took the photograph in a 1947 radio interview:

I was there in the trench with about twenty milicianos ... I just kind of put my camera above my head and even [sic] didn't look and clicked the picture, when they moved over the trench. And that was all. ... [T]hat camera which I hold [sic] above my head just caught a man at the moment when he was shot. That was probably the best picture I ever took. I never saw the picture in the frame because the camera was far above my head.

The photograph was first published in the French news magazine Vu on September 23, 1936. It was published in the United States in Life magazine on July 12, 1937.

Upon publication of the photograph, there were allegations from the FET y de las JONS, the sole ruling party of the Francoist regime, that the photograph was staged. However, outside of Spain, it remained unquestioned as a legitimate documentary photograph until the 1970s.

== Authenticity debate ==
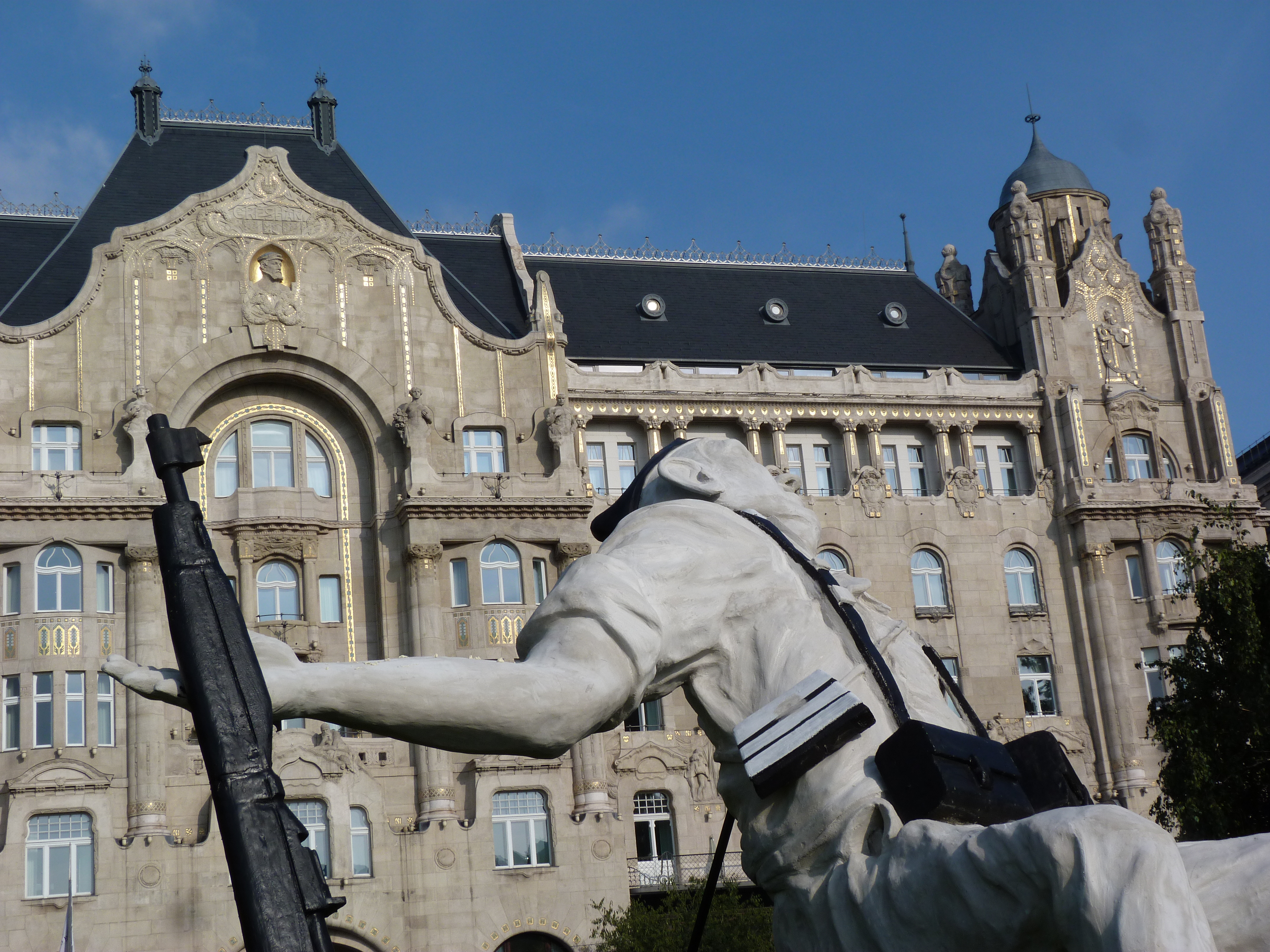
October 7, 2015 "Capa statue" by Ervin Herve Loranth in Budapest, modeled after The Falling Soldier. The sculpture was criticized and later destroyed.

While some, including one of Capa's biographers, Richard Whelan, have defended the photograph's authenticity, doubts have been raised since 1975. Staging photos was a common occurrence during the Spanish Civil War because of limits imposed upon photojournalists' freedom of movement: unable to go to active fronts, or cordoned off when they were, photographers resorted to pictures of soldiers feigning combat. It had been claimed that the photograph was taken at the battle site of Cerro Muriano, but research suggests it was taken in the town of Espejo, about 50 kilometres (30 miles) away.

A 2007 documentary, La sombra del iceberg, claims that the picture was staged and that Frederico Borrell García is not the individual in the picture. In José Manuel Susperregui's 2009 book Sombras de la Fotografía (Shadows of Photography), he concludes that the photograph was not taken at Cerro Muriano but at another location about 50 kilometres (30 miles) away. Susperregui determined the location of the photograph by examining the background of other photographs from the same sequence as the Falling Soldier, in which a range of mountains can be seen. He then e-mailed images to librarians and historians in towns near Córdoba, asking if they recognized the landscape, and received a positive response from the Spanish town of Espejo. Because Espejo was miles away from the battle lines when Capa was there, Susperregui said this meant that the Falling Soldier photograph was staged, as were all the others in the same series, supposedly taken on the front.

Susperregui also pointed out more contradictions in the accepted account of the photograph, noting that Capa mentioned in interviews that the militiaman had been killed by a burst of machine-gun fire rather than a sniper's bullet. Capa also gave different accounts of the vantage point and technique he used to obtain the photograph. Spanish newspapers, including a newspaper from Barcelona, El Periódico de Catalunya, sent reporters to Espejo to verify the location of the photograph. The reporters returned with photographs showing a close match between the present day skyline and the background of Capa's photographs.

Willis E. Hartshorn, director of the International Center of Photography, argued against the claims that the photograph was staged. He suggested that the soldier in the photograph had been killed by a sniper firing from a distance while posing for the staged photograph. Susperregui dismissed the suggestion, pointing out that the front lines were too widely separated and that there was no documentary evidence for the use of snipers on the Córdoba front.

There is also doubt about the identification of the photograph's subject. It was believed that Frederico Borrell García was the subject, but he was actually killed at Cerro Muriano and was shot while sheltered behind a tree. In addition to a lack of clarity of the location of the photograph, Frederico Borrell García did not greatly resemble the subject of the photograph.

== "The Mexican Suitcase" ==
Photographs by Capa, Gerda Taro, and David Seymour, came to light in early 2007, when three cardboard boxes of negatives, also known as the "Mexican Suitcase", arrived in the mail at the International Center of Photography in New York. The 'suitcase' contained hundreds of Capa's negatives. These films were taken to Mexico at the end of the war. They are now with the Capa archives at the International Center of Photography.

However, there was no negative of Capa's Falling Soldier. Despite the lack of a negative, hundreds of images that toured major art galleries in 2008 showed pictures taken at the same location and at the same time. A detailed analysis of the landscape in the series of pictures taken with that of the Falling Soldier has proven that the action, whether genuine or staged, took place near Espejo.

Richard Whelan, in This Is War! Robert Capa at Work, states,

The image, known as Death of a Loyalist militiaman or simply The Falling Soldier, has become almost universally recognized as one of the greatest war photographs ever made. The photograph has also generated a great deal of controversy. In recent years, it has been alleged that Capa staged the scene, a charge that has forced me to undertake a fantastic amount of research over the course of two decades. (Nota 3) I have wrestled with the dilemma of how to deal with a photograph that one believes to be genuine but that one cannot know with absolute certainty to be a truthful documentation. It is neither a photograph of a man pretending to have been shot, nor an image made during what we would normally consider the heat of battle.

== Public collections ==
One printed edition of this photograph is now held in the collection of the Metropolitan Museum of Art, in New York.

== See also ==
- List of photographs considered the most important
