= Giridharilal Kedia =

Indian social entrepreneur

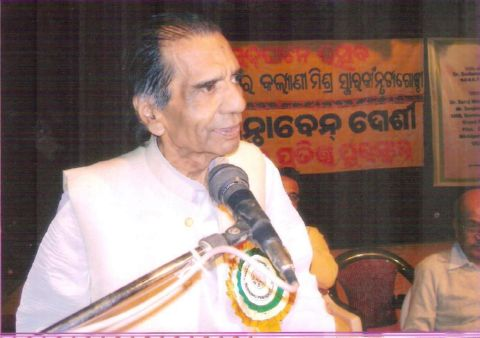
- Born: 25 August 1936; Cuttack
- Died: 19 December 2009 (aged 73); Cuttack
- Other name: liondayon
- Education: Zilla School, Sambalpur 1947 Batch
- Known for: former president of KVK, Cuttack; past district governor of Lions Club International 322C; chairman of IITM; etc
- Spouse: Droupdi Devi Kedia
- Children: Pramod Kumar Kedia; Pradeep Kedia
- Awards: "Lion of the year Award" for 1979–80 from the District, Master Key Award from the Lions International "SAMAJ GAURAV"award for his self less service

Giridharilal Kedia (25 August 1936 – 19 December 2009) was an Indian well known social entrepreneur. He served the Kala Vikash Kendra, Cuttack for 12 years as the Working President and Trustee. Kedia was also the founder and chairman of Image Institute of Technology & Management. He was awarded the Samaj Gaurav award for his service. He was also awarded the Theater Movement Award by Global Peace Organization. Kedia was a District Governor of Lions Club International for the years 1981-1982 for the undivided district 322C.

== Early life ==
When he was only eight years old, Kedia's father died. He was brought up by his mother Ginya Devi Kedia (Shyama), and had to interrupt his education while still in his teens to take over the management of the family business.

== Achievements ==
=== Business ===
The first family business was selling of yarn, but Kedia pushed forward and diversified into textiles, petroleum, tyres, automobile spare parts, lubricants and real estate. He also adopted the business of text books.

=== Social life ===
Kedia had not detached ever from the mainstream of society rather attached more sincerely with so many social organization not only in Cuttack but beyond Cuttack as the legacy and followed the foot print of his father Late Banarasilal who was a social reformer and man of culture. "Pratistha Samma" from VysyaSamaj.

Kedia became a charter member when the Lions Club of Cuttack was chartered in 1974. He served the club in various capacities: he became the President of the club in 1975, Bulletin editor in 1977–78 and Leo adviser in 1978–79. He also served the district as a Zone Chairman in 1976–77, Deputy District Governor in 1977–78 of undivided District 322-B and the Cabinet Secretary of the newly formed District 322-C in 1979–80. In 1980–81 he served as a District Chairman of LCIF and was responsible for organizing a district level seminar. He was unanimously elected to serve the district as its first Lt. Governor for 1981–82 and then District Governor in 1982–83. He served the Multiple District 322 as Council Treasurer in 1982–83 and Council Secretary in 1983–84. He was awarded 100% President Award, Membership Growth, Extension, Perfect Attendance and the Master Key Award from the Lions International. He has also "Lion of the year Award" for 1979–80 from the District.

Marwari Yuva Manch was another field of social activities and he was granted "SAMAJ GAURAV"award for his service. He served as Vice-President of Utkal Pradeshik Kedia Sabha. He was also attached to Biswa Kalyan Path Chakra.

=== Cultural life ===
Kedia was one of the life members of Kalavikash Kendra, Cuttack and served the Kendra for 12 years as the working president. During this period Kalavikash Kendra gave a number of new artists to the nation. Kedia received awards like the Theater Movement Award by Global Peace Organization. He had served as the founder member of Navakalika, for dance and music.

=== Educationalist ===
He played an important role in organizing the 49th Indian Science Congress in 1962 at Ravenshaw College, Cuttack, in association with Dr. B. Mukherji. He was a voracious reader and this became the instrument in organizing the Marwari Hindi Vidyalaya as the President. He was attached to Marwari High School of Cuttack. His greatest achievement was the establishment of Image Institute of Technology & Management, Upper Telenga Bazar, Cuttack in 2002. He started the Little Hearts Academy, a play school for the development of children from grass root level.

=== Spiritual life ===
He was the founder as well as the president of Maruti Mandap, Chowdhuribazar, Cuttack and also of Ramayan Prachar Samiti as well the member of Bhagbat Prachar Samiti. He was associated with Ramacharit Manas Path Samiti and was a member of Divine Life Society of India and Shyam Sundar Math. He was the trustee of Sankirtan Bhawan Dharmik Nyas Jhunsi (Allahabad) and of Vrindaban and was also associated with Akhil Bharat Jagannath Consciousness Sansad.
