= Augusto Pérez Garmendia =

Augusto Pérez Garmendia (1899 in Donosti – 1936 in Pamplona), was a Spanish military man. He was Chief of the Spanish Republican Army General Staff in San Sebastián at the time of the coup d'état of 1936 that gave rise to the Spanish Civil War, although his official post was at Oviedo.

After soliciting to return to its position in Asturias when knowing the blow, the Civil Governor of Guipuzcoa begged that he remain in the Basque Country then lacking sufficient professional soldiers loyal to the Second Spanish Republic.

With a lack of ammunition and arms in San Sebastián, on 21 July he organized an expedition with 60 vehicles to Vitoria, where Lieutenant Colonel Camilo Alonso Vega had revolted, to defeat the rebels and to supply themselves, while he took command of another column under colonel Joaquin Vidal Munárriz from Vizcaya. He hoped to be able to count on units of artillery and engineers to join the expedition but which revolted in the quarters of Loyola under Lieutenant Colonel Jose Vallespín Cobián. After gathering a column of infantry in Mondragón, and with the news of the revolt of Loyola and the problems of San Sebastián where the forces of Vallespín had become strong, he went to Éibar to rearm and gather more volunteers and to return to San Sebastián. Loyal forces of the republican government organized a new expedition to Vitoria from Bilbao.

Garmendia entered San Sebastián on 22 July, restoring order on the 23rd after seizing the buildings occupied by the insurrectionists. Afterward, the column went to the front in Oiartzun, where Garmendia was wounded and captured on 28 July, and transferred to Pamplona in where he died days later as a result of gangrene from his untreated wounds.

== Sources ==
- Enciclopedia Bernardo Estornés Lasa
- Romero, Eladi, Itinerarios de la Guerra Civil española : guía del viajero curioso, Barcelona : Laertes, 2001, 600 p.
- Barruso, Pedro, Verano y revolución. La guerra civil en Gipuzkoa' (julio-septiembre de 1936), Edita: Haramburu Editor. San Sebastián, 1996.
  - Pedro Barruso, GIPUZKOA 1936: VERANO Y REVOLUCIÓN, LA GUERRA CIVIL EN GIPUZKOA (Spanish)
- Hugh Thomas (2001). The Spanish Civil War. Modern Library. ISBN 0-375-75515-2.
