= Štefan Lux =

Slovak Jewish journalist

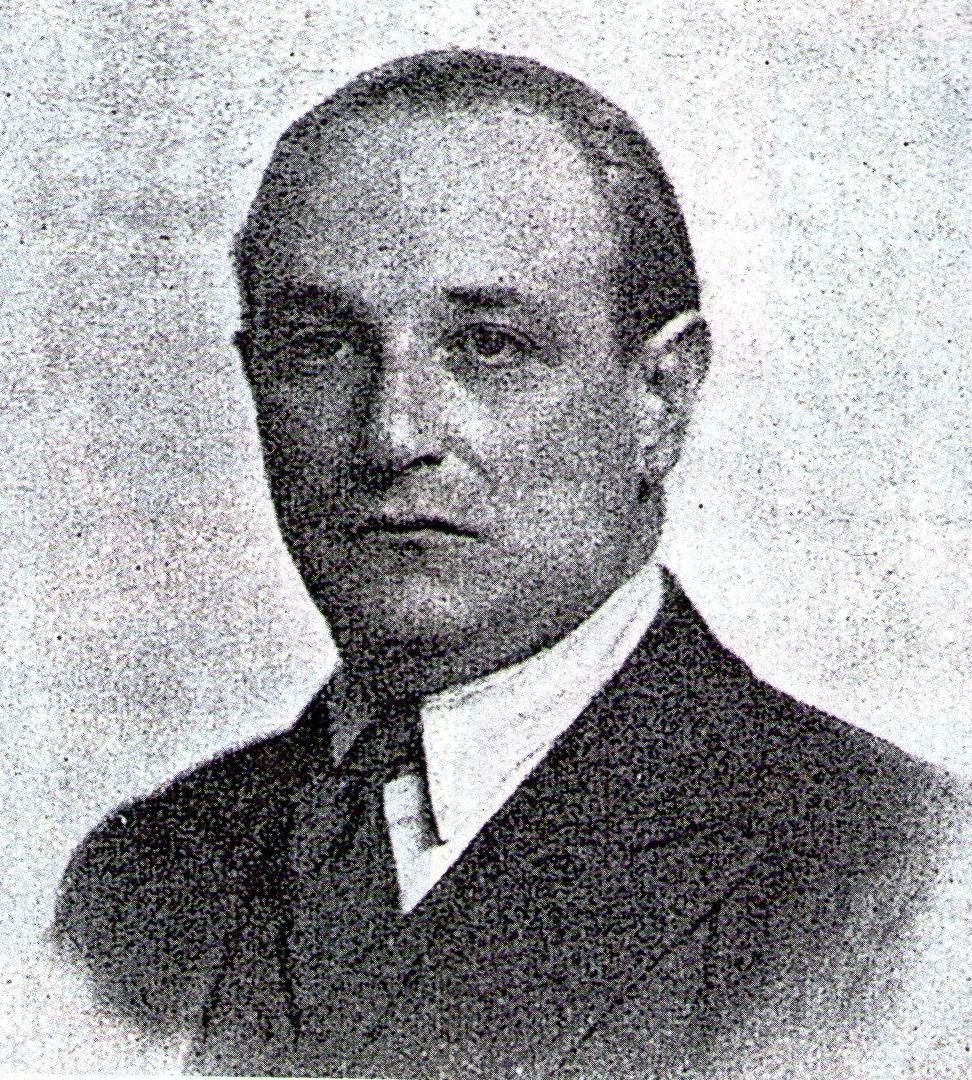
- Born: 11 November 1888; Malacky, Austro-Hungarian Empire
- Died: 3 July 1936 (aged 47); Geneva, Switzerland
- Citizenship: Czechoslovakia
- Occupations: Journalist, writer, stage actor, film director

Štefan Lux (4 November 1888 – 3 July 1936) was a Slovak Jewish journalist, and a Czechoslovak citizen who committed suicide in the general assembly of the League of Nations during its session on 3 July 1936. He shot himself in order to alert the world leaders of the rising dangers of German authoritarianism, expansionism, antisemitism, and militarism, hoping this would inspire the international community to take collective action against Nazi Germany.

== Personal life ==
Lux was born to Jewish parents in Hungary in 1888. He studied drama in Vienna, and by 1911 he had moved to Berlin. He served Austria-Hungary in World War I, and was wounded twice.

After the war, Lux returned to Berlin, where he helped to found the Social Film Society. He directed a film starring Rudolph Shildkraut about the forced expulsions of the Jewish people throughout history, which was scheduled to premiere in March 1920. However, after the Kapp Putsch, a failed coup attempt which sought to restore the Kaiser to the throne of Germany, the funding was withdrawn and the film never premiered.

Lux bounced between jobs during the 1920s and early 1930s, during which time he wrote for Die Weltbühne (The World Stage), a left-wing German newspaper which was banned by the Nazi party in 1933. That same year, Lux fled with his wife and son back to his hometown of Malacky, which was now located within the borders of Czechoslovakia. There, he began working as a photojournalist for the Prager Press.

Lux was married and had a son, who was twelve years old at the time of his death.

== Death, last words, and aftermath ==
On July 2, 1936, the night before his suicide, Lux paid his hotel bill and told the hotel employee that he would be connected to an important development the following day. The employee jokingly asked if he was going to be elected president of Czechoslovakia, to which Lux replied "No, but this development will be sensational."

On July 3, the League Assembly met to discuss the Italian invasion of Ethiopia, the Spanish Civil War, and the legal status of Jewish refugees from Germany Lux entered the Palais des Nations using press accreditations he had acquired with the help of Paul de Blochet, a journalist from the Journal de Geneve. According to Lux's letter to Joseph Avenol, Blochet had no prior knowledge of Lux's suicide.

Lux left the press gallery and entered the Assembly floor, where the delegates gathered, and shot himself in the chest. Accounts of his final words are conflicting. According to The New York Times, he said "c'est la denier coup" (this is the last blow). According to the Chicago Daily Tribune, the Washington Post, and the Jewish Exponent, his final words were "this is the end, it is all over." According to the Journal de Genève, he shouted "c'est la dernière victime" (this is the last victim). The Israelitisches Wochenblatt reported that he said "c'est ma dernière" (this is my last one).

Lux was transported by ambulance to the hospital and died at nine o'clock that evening. He was buried in a Jewish cemetery in Geneva, where he was honoured as a martyr. The cemetery, which lies across the border of France and Switzerland, was allegedly later used by Jewish refugees escaping Nazi-occupied France during World War Two.

Following the suicide, the League of Nations launched an investigation into how Lux had obtained press credentials and how he had accessed the Assembly floor, resulting in stricter security protocols.

== Suicide letters ==
Lux wrote letters to Joseph Avenol, Anthony Eden, King Edward VIII, the Manchester Guardian, The Times of London, and Paul de Blochet, a local journalist who had helped him acquire his press credentials. According to varying contemporary accounts, he may have carried them in a briefcase, in his pocket, or set them directly on the podium at the Assembly.

Lux's letter to Avenol was written in German and dated to July 2, 1936. In it, he apologized for any embarrassment his death might cause to the League and asked him to ensure the other letters reached their destinations, emphasizing Avenol's trustworthiness by virtue of his position as Secretary-General. However, Avenol harboured sympathies for the Nazi party. After the German occupation of France in 1940, he resigned from the League of Nations and travelled home to France to offer his services to the Vichy regime. Historian Carolyn Biltoft suggests that the reduction of Lux to his Jewish identity in the League's rhetoric was influenced by Avenol's personal leanings.

The two newspapers did receive the letters addressed to them, though neither published the letters. The letters to Anthony Eden and Edward VIII were sent to the British Foreign Office in Geneva, who returned the letters. Lux's letter to Eden ended up in the Swiss federal archives in Berne, while the rest of the letters have been lost.

Lux begged Anthony Eden, the British foreign secretary, to take action against Germany's criminal regime, stating "I do not whisper, Sir Eden, I shout it out: in Germany, you are dealing with criminals." He invoked his authority as a "dead man" to be heard, and specifically urged the swift resolution of the Italo-Ethiopian War.

== Global reaction ==
Global news coverage of Lux's death focused on his antisemitism and his Jewish identity rather than the broader context of Lux's actions. This characterization came from organizations across the political spectrum including explicitly antisemitic sources, which portrayed Lux as a "deranged refugee," more 'neutral' sources such as the New York Times and the Chicago Tribune, and from Jewish sources; the Israelitisches Wochenblatt, for example, declared that his actions were a "Maccabees deed."

Lux's suicide occurred during the broader downfall and collapse of the League of Nations during the late 1930s, as nationalism and militarism grew and the major powers increasingly withdrew their support from the League. While Lux believed in the ideals of the League of Nations, and hoped that his actions would motivate League decision-makers to throw their support behind international cooperation, some people saw his death as a symbolic representation of the League's own death. For example, Der Sturmer, a German tabloid dedicated to spreading antisemitic propaganda, published a caricature of Lux's death captioned "In the League of Nations Kosher blood flew; A Jew Shot himself as a gesture yesterday. He announced to the outside world: the League of Nations has been shot." Germany was especially hostile to the League of Nations, which had been created in part to administer the punitive terms of the Treaty of Versailles.

Condemning his act, but paying tribute to his cause, the journalist Léon Savary concluded: "People bold enough to fight for justice shouldn't kill themselves, but stay at their position."

Less than six months after Lux's death, journalist Betty Sargent arrived in Geneva. According to Sargent, Lux was never mentioned during the five years she spent there as a League correspondent for British and American newspapers. She first encountered Lux's name half a century later, while researching in the Manchester Guardian's archives. Intrigued by the story, and the silence surrounding it, she became the first person to rediscover the story of Lux's suicide. Sargent wrote an article entitled "The Desperate Mission of Stefan Lux," which was published in 1989 and reprinted in 2001.

== Works ==
- As film Director:
  - 1920 – Gerechtigkeit

== Memorials ==
- Amen. a Costa-Gavras movie of 2002 begins with the suicide of Lux in Geneva.
- Corrosion of Conformity's 1994 song "Pearls Before Swine" contains audio in the first 30 seconds of Lux's pre-speech introduction to the League of Nations.

== See also ==
- Self-immolation, suicide for the purpose of protest

== Bibliography ==
- Michael Biggs; The Transnational Diffusion of Protest by Self-Immolation; Department of Sociology, University of Oxford (2005), p. 17–29
- Betty Sargent; The Desperate Mission of Stefan Lux; The Georgia review. 55, no. 4, (2001): 187; Athens, University of Georgia. OCLC 95114451
- (in German) Der Opfertod von Genf : die Tat des Stephan Lux vor der Völkerbundsversammlung in the Israelitische Wochenblatt für die Schweiz 10 July 1936.
- (in German) Arnold Hahn : Vor den Augen der Welt ! Warum starb Stefan Lux ? Sein Leben, seine Tat, seine Briefe (Prag : Verlag der Cechoslovakisches Liga gegen den Antisemitismus, 1936). OCLC 71996332
- (in Spanish) Stefan Lux : Porqué se mató el periodista Stéfan Lux : apuntes para la historia de un mártir del siglo XX.; Buenos Aires : Columna, 1937. OCLC 77527672
- (in German) Rüdiger Strempel: Lux. Gegen den Nationalsozialismus und die Lethargie der Welt. Osburg Verlag, Hamburg 2020, ISBN 978-3-95510-216-6.
- (in French) League of Nations Archives : Registry n° 15/24650/17433.
