= Federico Borrell García =

Spanish anarchist

- Death of a Loyalist Soldier
- Born: 3 January 1912; Benilloba, Valencian Community, Spain
- Died: 5 September 1936 (aged 24); Cerro Muriano, Spain
- Cause of death: Killed in action
- Known for: The Falling Soldier

Federico Borrell García (3 January 1912 – 5 September 1936) was a Spanish Republican and anarchist militiaman during the Spanish Civil War, commonly thought to be the subject in the famous Robert Capa photo The Falling Soldier.

== Biography ==
He was born in Benilloba, Valencian Community, and went by the nickname "Taino". He worked at a mill in Alcoi and he founded the local branch of the anarchist Iberian Federation of Libertarian Youth (FIJL). He joined the local Loyalist militia, the Columna Alcoiana, set up to defend the Spanish Republic against the Spanish Nationalist forces of Francisco Franco.

According to some sources, on the morning of 5 September 1936, Borrell was one of about fifty men who arrived at Cerro Muriano in Córdoba to reinforce the militia against Francoist forces commanded by General José Enrique Varela. During that afternoon Borrell was defending the artillery battery to the rear of the Alcoi infantry when enemy troops infiltrated behind the Loyalists and fired at them from behind. Borrell was fatally shot around five o’clock on or near the hill known as La Loma de las Malagueñas. According to Spanish government records, he was the only member of the Columna Alcoiana to die in the fighting at Cerro Muriano that day. Everisto García, his brother, identified him from the photo.

Other versions claim that Borrell could have been shot and killed by rebels when posing for Robert Capa. The 2007 documentary La sombra del iceberg claims that the picture was staged and that Borrell is not the individual in the picture.

It is not known where Borrell, or the other, unidentified, militiaman killed shortly after, are buried, although the most likely place is the nearby cemetery at Villaharta.
