= Battle of Sigüenza =

Spanish Civil War battle (1936)

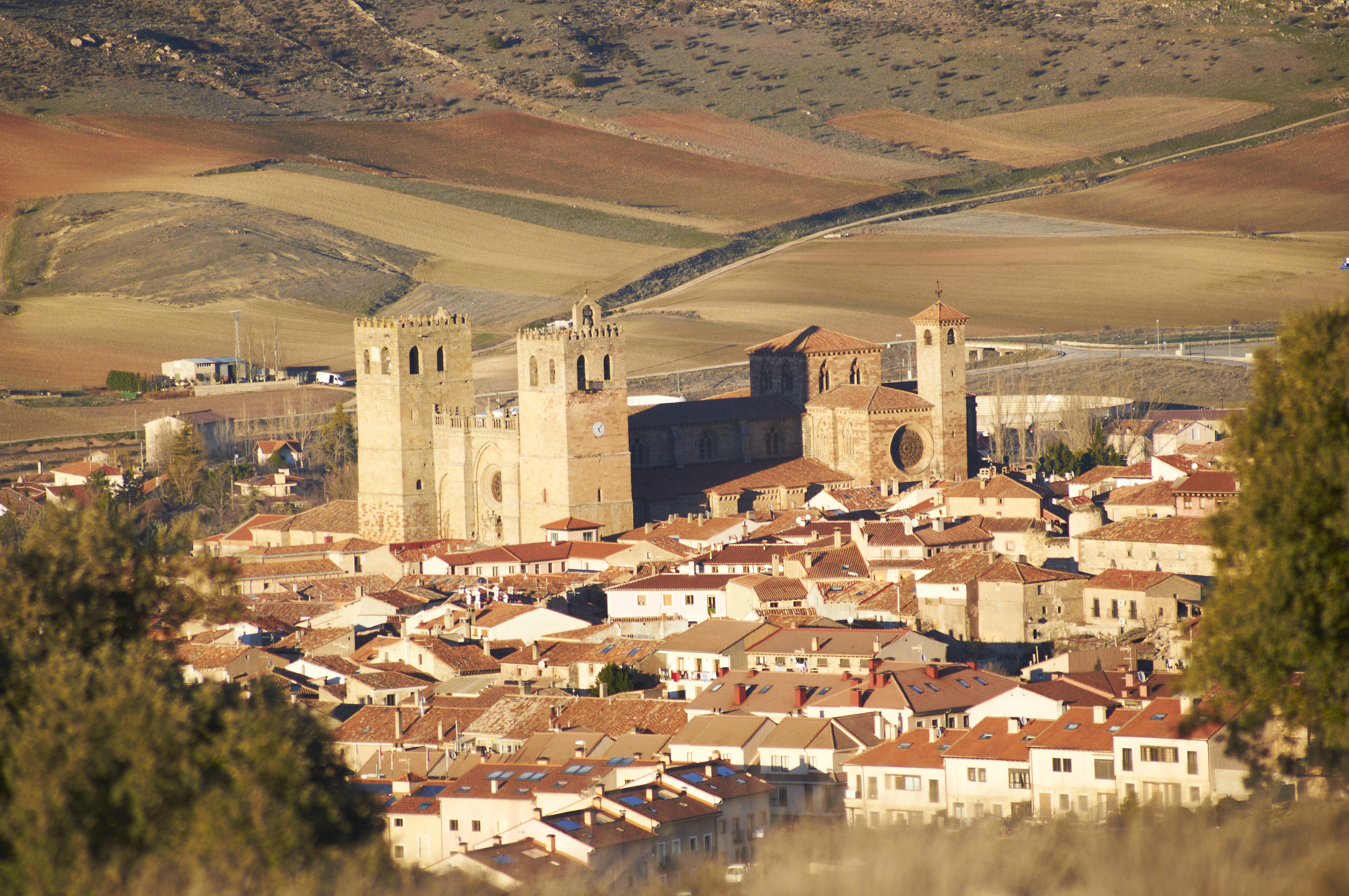
Republicans held the cathedral for 20 days during the Battle of Sigüenza in 1936.

The Battle of Sigüenza took place from 7 August 1936 to 15 October 1936 during the Spanish Civil War.

Sigüenza's position north-east of Madrid made it an important strategic location for the rebel opponents of the elected government, also known as the Nationalists and later led by Franco, in their advance on Madrid. The Republicans, consisting of loyalist supporters of the elected government and volunteers who came to Spain to fight against the fascist rebels, barricaded the city to protect it from the rebels, and made guerilla attacks on nearby rebel bases.

By the beginning of October the rebels had surrounded Madrid in a "C" shape, with Sigüenza being an important location on the "C" holding the rebels back from Madrid. The rebel troops surrounded the Sigüenza and with the assistance of heavy air raids took the city.

After reports that the rebels were advancing on Sigüenza to stop travel to and from Madrid in early October, the town was reported to have fallen to the rebels on 9 October, leaving both flanks of the government defences "seriously threatened". On 11 October the government claimed they had retaken Sigüenza, though the rebels denied this. In the 12 October edition, the New York Times reported "desperate fighting at Sigüenza". A few days later, the rebels had taken Sigüenza again and had moved closer to Madrid.

Rather than surrender, 300 remaining soldiers, including personnel from the FAI, barricaded themselves inside the cathedral, for 20 days according to one report, for a week according to another. Eventually the soldiers ran out of the cathedral, shooting at the enemy. They were all killed. The cathedral was badly damaged during the fighting, but was subsequently repaired.

Militiawomen who had signed up to fight fascism were among the fallen soldiers at the Battle of Sigüenza. Women who had travelled to Spain to fight against the fascists also took part in the Battle of Sigüenza, including Argentinian Mika Etchebéhère, who initially worked as an administrative assistant and ambulance officer, but who took up arms after her husband was killed at Sigüenza, and later became captain of her unit.
