= January 1937 =

Month of 1937

<<	January 1937					>>
Su	Mo	Tu	We	Th	Fr	Sa
					1	2
3	4	5	6	7	8	9
10	11	12	13	14	15	16
17	18	19	20	21	22	23
24	25	26	27	28	29	30
31

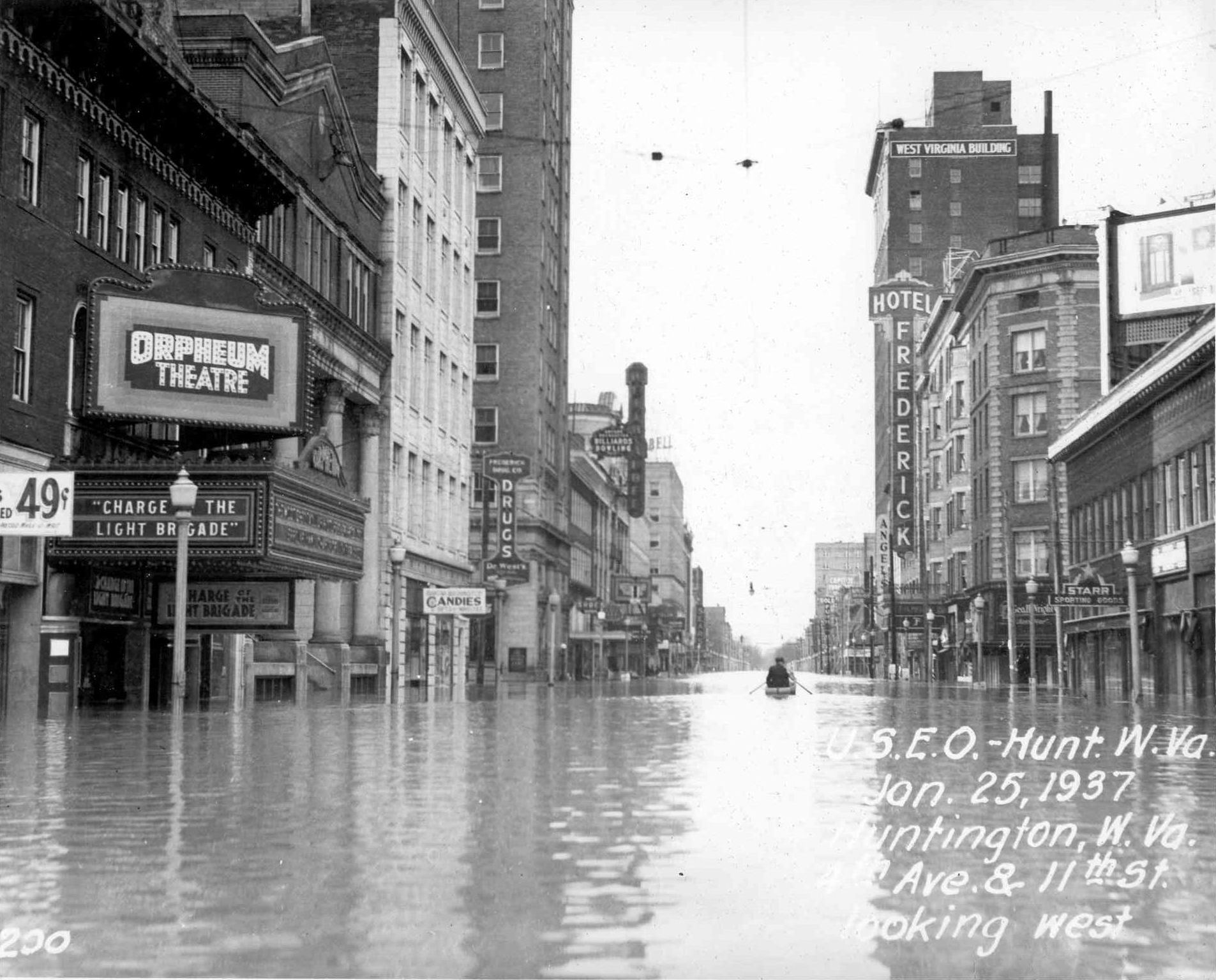
January 18, 1937: Ohio River overflows its banks, causing almost 400 deaths

The following events occurred in January 1937:

== January 1, 1937 (Friday) ==
- In retaliation for the Palos incident of the previous week, the German cruiser Königsberg forced the Spanish steamer Soton aground near Santander while the Graf Spee stopped another steamer, the Aragon, and forced it to change course to a Nationalist-held port. The Spanish government called Germany's recent naval actions "acts of aggression and war." Germany sent a note offering to release the Aragon and cease attacks on Spanish shipping as soon as restitution was made for the loss of cargo of the Palos, a proposal which Spain rejected.
- The Public Order Act 1936 went into effect in the United Kingdom, banning the wearing of political uniforms and empowering the police to stop political marches when there is risk of disorder. The Act, given royal assent on December 18, was aimed at the British Union of Fascists, led by Oswald Mosley, whose black shirt uniforms had been modeled after those of the Fascist Party of Italy.
- General Anastasio Somoza García was inaugurated as the 21st President of Nicaragua in a colorful ceremony on the parade grounds at the foot of Loma Hill in Managua. beginning 19 years of rule that would last until his assassination in 1956, and control of Nicaragua by the Somoza family until 1979. Somoza, commander of the Nicaraguan National Guard, succeeded Carlos Alberto Brenes, whom he had installed after leading a military coup d'état on June 9, and winning a fraudulent election on December 8.
- Alan Turing's seminal 1936 paper on the principles of modern computing was published, titled On Computable Numbers, with an Application to the Entscheidungsproblem, and presenting the concept of a Universal Turing Machine.
- In American college football, with the Associated Press having issued its final rankings on November 30, the #3 ranked Pittsburgh Panthers beat the #5 ranked Washington Huskies, 21 to 0, in the Rose Bowl in Pasadena, California. The #2 ranked LSU Tigers lost to the Santa Clara Broncos, 21–14 in the Sugar Bowl. Because the Big Ten Conference did not allow its members to play in postseason bowl games, the #1 ranked Minnesota Golden Gophers (who had beaten the Washington Huskies in their season opener) remained idle.
- The first Cotton Bowl was played in Dallas as the highest ranked team in Texas, the TCU Horned Frogs beat the Marquette Golden Avalanche 16–6.
- Born:
  - Sayed Amjad Hussain, Pakistani-born American cardiothoracic surgeon who developed the pleuroperitoneal shunt and a special endotracheal tube; in Peshawar, North West Frontier Province, British India (now Khyber Pakhtunkhwa in Pakistan)
  - Porter W. Anderson Jr., American microbiologist known for developing a vaccine against bacterial meningitis from the influenza virus H. influenzae B.
  - Vinod Kumar Shukla, Indian Hindi novelist; in Rajnandgaon, princely state of Nangaon, British India (now in Chhattisgarh state of India)
  - Chuck Davis, African-American choreographer and dancer who founded DanceAfrica, the Chuck Davis Dance Company, and the African American Dance Ensemble; in Raleigh, North Carolina (d. 2017)
  - Matt Robinson, African-American TV actor known for portraying one of the human characters on the first seasons of Sesame Street; in Philadelphia (d. 2002)
  - Lenita Airisto, Finnish business leader and TV journalist, former beauty pageant winner; in Helsinki
- Died:
  - Lieutenant Colonel Frederick I. Eglin, U.S. Army officer and pilot for whom Eglin Air Force Base is named. Eglin and a co-pilot, Lieutenant Howard E. Shelton, were killed in the crash of a Northrop A-17 airplane into the side of Cheaha Mountain in the U.S. state of Alabama.
  - Father William J. Stanton, Canadian Roman Catholic missionary and former Canadian football coach, was killed in a car accident when his automobile overturned in a ditch as he was driving from Cedar Springs, Ontario to Blenheim, Ontario.
  - Bhaktisiddhanta Sarasvati, 62, Hindu Bengali Indian theologian of the Gaudiya Vaishnavi sect

== January 2, 1937 (Saturday) ==
- Great Britain and Italy signed a "gentleman's agreement" pledging to mutually respect one another's rights and interests in the Mediterranean as well as Spain's independence and integrity.
- U.S. automobile manufacturer Nash Motors (known for the Nash Rambler) merged with the Kelvinator company, manufacturer of refrigerators, to create the Nash-Kelvinator Corporation. In 1954, Nash-Kelvinator would acquire Hudson Motor Car Company to create the American Motors Corporation (AMC), which would be acquired by the Chrysler Corporation in 1988.
- The detective film Smart Blonde, starring Glenda Farrell and Barton MacLane in the first of seven movies teaming reporter Torchy Blane and her boyfriend, detective Steve McBride, was released by Warner Bros. studio.
- Born: Marianne McDonald, American philanthropist; in Chicago
- Died: Ross Alexander (stage name for Alexander Ross Smith), 29, American stage and film actor known as the star of the 1936 movie Hot Money, shot himself with a .22 caliber revolver.

== January 3, 1937 (Sunday) ==
- In China, 128 drug addicts were taken to a village near Tianjin and executed by firing squad.
- Evacuation of British citizens from Gibraltar continued as the Royal Navy destroyer HMS Gallant (H59) took on 252 civilians, 116 of whom were women and children.
- During the Second Battle of the Corunna Road in the Spanish Civil War, the Nationalists captured Villafranca del Castillo west of Madrid in the "Battle of the Fog".
- The first science fiction convention in Britain, and perhaps the world, took place in Leeds at the Theosophical Hall with 20 fans, including Arthur C. Clarke and Eric Frank Russell, attending. The meeting was organized by the Leeds chapter of Britain's Science Fiction League.
- The finals of Germany's Tschammerpokal were played at the Olympiastadion in Berlin, bringing an end to a tournament that had started with 5,291 soccer football teams competing for the 64 spots in the knockout competition. VfB Leipzig defeated Schalke 04, 2 to 1, before a crowd of 70,000.
- Born:
  - General Asif Nawaz Janjua, Chief of Staff of the Pakistani Army from 1991 until his death; in Chakri Rajgan, Punjab province, British India (d. 1993 from arsenic poisoning)
  - Stanley John Smith, Australian organized crime hitman known as "The Enforcer"; in Balmain, New South Wales (d. 2010)
- Died: Richard Weiner, 52, Czech writer, died of stomach cancer.

== January 4, 1937 (Monday) ==
- France restored the Constitution of Lebanon after it had been suspended for a number of years.
- The winners of the 2nd New York Film Critics Circle Awards were announced. Mr. Deeds Goes to Town was named Best Film of 1936.
- The U.S. Supreme Court decided De Jonge v. Oregon, unanimously holding that a law against criminal syndicalism could not be applied against someone merely for speaking at a meeting of an organization deemed to be a criminal syndicate (in the case at hand, the Communist Party of Oregon). Writing for the Court, Chief Justice Charles Evans Hughes commented, "The greater the importance of safeguarding the community from incitements to the overthrow of our institutions by force and violence, the more imperative is the need to preserve inviolate the constitutional rights of free speech, free press, and free assembly in order to maintain the opportunity for free political discussion, to the end that government may be responsive to the will of the people and that changes, if desired, may be obtained by peaceful means. Therein lies the security of the Republic, the very foundation of constitutional government."
- Born:
  - Grace Bumbry, African-American mezzo-soprano opera singer; in St. Louis (d. 2023)
  - Dyan Cannon (stage name for Samille Diane Friesen), American actress; in Tacoma, Washington
- Died:
  - Paul Behncke, 67, German admiral during the First World War, known for the 1916 Battle of Jutland against the British Royal Navy
  - Max Wenner, 49, English ornithologist and sportsman, was killed when he fell, jumped or was pushed out of a Sabena Airlines plane from an altitude of 3,000 feet (910 m). Wenner had boarded the Savoia-Marchetti S.73 airplane at Köln in Germany on a flight to Brussels in Belgium. His body was found four days later in a forest near the Belgian town of Genk.

== January 5, 1937 (Tuesday) ==
- The first issue of Look magazine, created by publisher Gardner Cowles Jr. and John Cowles Sr. as a rival to Life magazine launched two months earlier by Time Inc., went on sale in the United States. The initial magazine, dated "February 1937", had Nazi official Hermann Goering on its cover. As with Life, Look was filled with photos to supplement its new stories. Originally a monthly magazine for its first five issues, it became a biweekly magazine on May 11 and continue without interruption until its October 19, 1971 issue, 14 months before Life published its final issue.
- Khayreddin al-Ahdab formed a government as the new Prime Minister of Lebanon, at the time a French Mandate of the League of Nations, becoming the first Muslim to hold the post.
- The government of Nazi Germany recommended German artists depict at least four children in illustrations of German families.
- U.S. Representative William B. Bankhead of Alabama, a Democrat, won re-election as the Speaker of the United States House of representatives, receiving 324 of 421 votes cast (76.78%). Republican nominee Bertrand Snell of New York received 83 votes.
- The successful German film Panzerkreuzer Sebastopol: Weisse Sklaven (Battleship Sebastopol: White Slaves), directed by Karl Anton, premiered after being approved by Nazi censors. The film was described by a later historian as "a clumsy anti-communist Nazi replica" ("einer plump antikommunistischen NS-Replik") of Sergei Eisenstein's 1925 Soviet film Battleship Potemkin.
- Born:
  - Irwin Schiff, American mob associate nicknamed "The Fat Man"; in The Bronx, New York (murdered, 1987)
  - Abdul Monem, Bangladeshi entrepreneur, founder of the conglomerate AML (Abdul Monem Ltd) that owns Igloo Ice Cream company and Coca-Cola of Bangladesh, as well as AM Sugar Refinery Ltd., AM Rice Bran Oil, ServicEngine BPO, and AM Securities and Financial Services Ltd; in Brahmanbaria, Bengal Province, British India (d. 2020)
- Died: Aurora Picornell, Spanish Communist labor activist and seamstress, was executed along with four other women, after the Nationalists led by Francisco Franco captured the island of Menorca during the Spanish Civil War.

== January 6, 1937 (Wednesday) ==
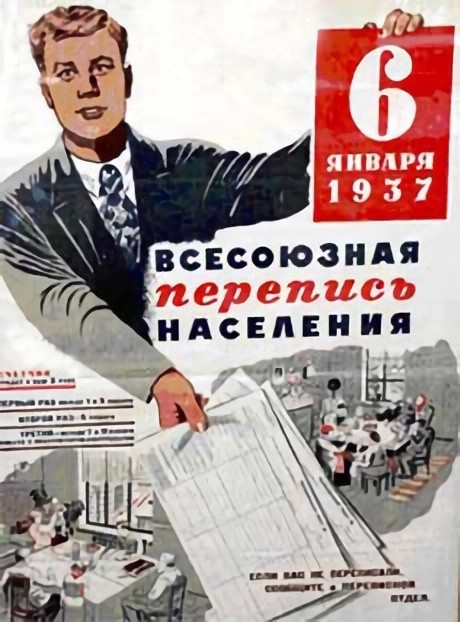
Poster for the 1937 Soviet census announcing "6 January 1937: All-union Census of Population"

- The Soviet Census of 1937 was held and resulted in a count of 162,039,470 people, much lower than the 180,000,000 expected by Soviet Premier Joseph Stalin. After the presentation of the results to Stalin in March, he ordered the arrest of Census Bureau, Olimpiy Kvitkin and census statisticians Mikhail Kurman, Lazar Brand, Ivan Oblomov and Ivan Kraval, as well as the chiefs of most of the regional statistical centers, and executions followed. The census would be set aside by decision of the Sovnarkom on September 25, with an editorial in the Communist Party newspaper declaring that "enemies of the people gave the census counters invalid instructions that led to the gross under-counting of the population, but the brave NKVD under the leadership of Nikolai Yezhov destroyed the snake's nest in the statistical bodies."
- U.S. President Franklin D. Roosevelt delivered the annual State of the Union address to Congress. "The statute of NRA has been outlawed", the president said. "The problems have not. They are still with us." Roosevelt said that means "must be found to adapt our legal forms and our judicial interpretation to the actual present national needs of the largest progressive democracy in the modern world."
- The U.S. Congress passed a resolution strictly forbidding the export of arms to Spain.
- Born:
  - Paolo Conte, Italian singer and pianist; in Asti
  - Linn F. Mollenauer, American physicist; in Washington, DC (d.2021)
  - Underwood Dudley, American mathematician and author known for the book Crank Mathematics, a criticism of pseudomathematics; in New York City
- Died:
  - Saint André of Montreal (André Bessette), 91, Canadian religious leader canonized as a Roman Catholic saint in 2010
  - Howard Vaughton, 75, English footballer who played for the England national team in 1882

== January 7, 1937 (Thursday) ==
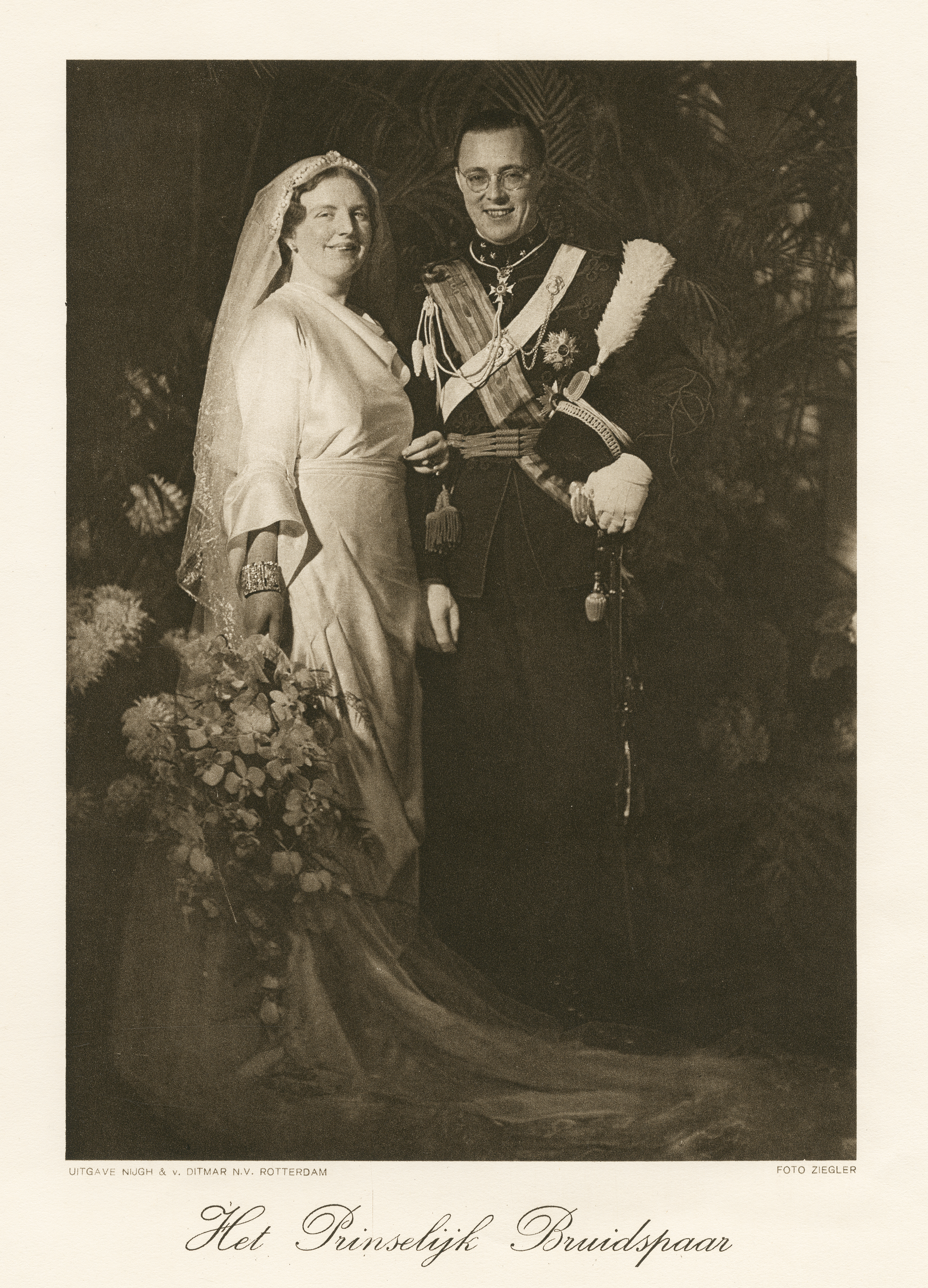
Juliana and Bernhard

- At an elaborate wedding ceremony in The Hague, Princess Juliana (who would later become Queen Juliana of the Netherlands), the only child of Queen Wilhelmina, married a German noble, Prince Bernhard of Lippe-Biesterfeld.
- The German opera The Eternal Road, written by Kurt Weill and with a libretto by Franz Werfel, was given its first performance, premiering at the Manhattan Opera House in New York City.
- Born:
  - Ali Soilih (Ali Soilih M'Tsashiwa), President of the Comoros from 1976 to 1978; in Mahajanga, French Madagascar (executed 1978)
  - Carlos Westendorp, Spanish diplomat and Spain's Minister of Foreign Affairs from 1995 to 1996, formerly Secretary of State for the European Union from 1991 to 1995; in Madrid

== January 8, 1937 (Friday) ==
- U.S. President Roosevelt signed an amendment to the Neutrality Act to establish an embargo on the shipment of weapons to Spain. His signature came too late to stop the vessel Mar Cantabrico, which had already left New York with just such a cargo.
- Born:
  - Shirley Bassey, Welsh singer; in Tiger Bay, Cardiff
  - Gohar Ayub Khan, Pakistan Minister for Foreign Affairs 1997-1998 and Speaker of the National Assembly of Pakistan from 1990 to 1993; in Rehana, North-West Frontier Province, British India (d. 2023)
  - Richard Miles, American diplomat; in Little Rock, Arkansas

== January 9, 1937 (Saturday) ==
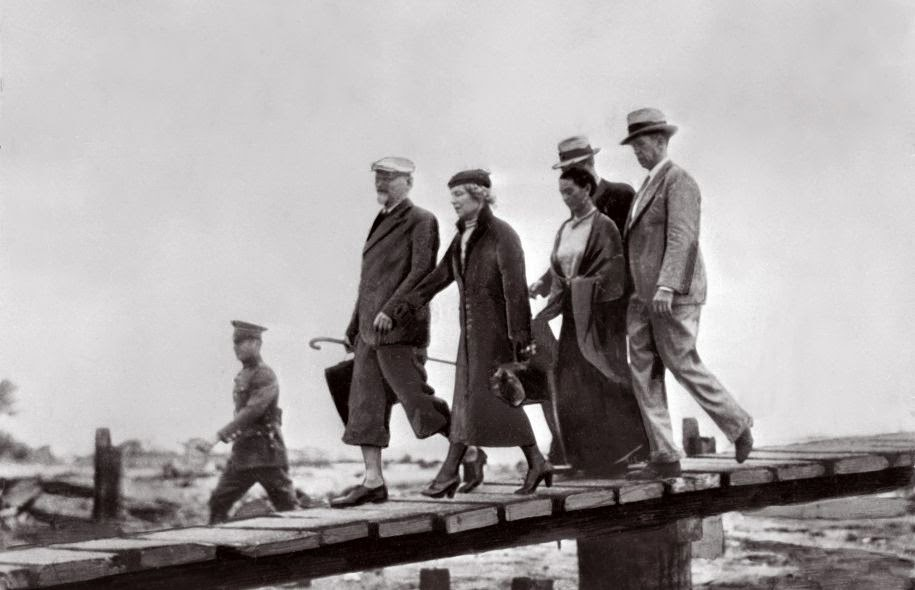
Trotsky and wife arrive in Mexico

- After being expelled from Norway on December 9 and deported on the oil tanker Ruth, former Soviet Russian activist Leon Trotsky and his wife Natalia Sedova arrived in Mexico, where he would spend the rest of his life until his assassination in 1940.
- Italy banned interracial marriage between its own citizens and women in its African colonies, specifically "Regular or irregular unions between Italians and Abyssinian women," referring to women in Ethiopia. Other decrees were that Jewish communities in Africa must open their business premises on Saturdays and shut them on Sundays," an application of Italy's existing Shop Hours Act to the colonies in Libya, Somalia and Ethiopia.
- The American Board of Surgery was established in Philadelphia for the purpose of certifying surgeons who have met a defined standard of education, training and knowledge.
- Born:
  - Consilio Fitzgerald, Irish Catholic nun and founder in 1966 of the Cuan Mhuire drug and alcohol rehabilitation center; in Brosna, County Kerry
  - Michael Nicholson, British journalist, war correspondent and newscaster for ITV; in Romford, Essex (d. 2016)
  - Malcolm Cecil, British jazz musician and record producer; in London (d. 2021)

== January 10, 1937 (Sunday) ==
- With the Spanish Nationalists of Francisco Franco conducting bombing raids and advancing to capture Spain's capital, the Spanish government ordered an evacuation of all noncombatant citizens remaining in Madrid.
- The report of the Brownlow Committee (officially the President's Committee on Administrative Management), appointed by U.S. President Franklin D. Roosevelt to recommend for reorganization of the executive branch of the U.S. government, was presented by the President to seven congressional leaders who had been summoned to the White House for a Sunday meeting. Composed of three professors of political science — Louis Brownlow and Charles Merriam of the University of Chicago and Luther Gulick of Columbia University— the Committee declared that "The President needs help," and delivered recommendations that Roosevelt discussed with his cabinet the next day and then to Congress on Tuesday.
- France massed troops in French Morocco and threatened to occupy the Spanish side if the Nationalists refused to quickly oust the Germans reported in the territory. France feared that Germany was building up troops there under the guise of "volunteers" in preparation for a surprise attack on French Morocco.
- Britain warned its citizens that anyone volunteering to fight for either side in the Spanish Civil War would be subject to prosecution under the Foreign Enlistment Act of 1870.
- Died:
  - Julius Stieglitz, 69, American organic chemist known for his discovery of the Stieglitz rearrangement
  - Clarence Eddy, 85, American composer
  - Martemyan Ryutin, 46, former member of the Soviet Communist Party Central Committee and opponent of Soviet premier Joseph Stalin, was executed after being convicted of treason along with Ivar Smilga, 45, Pyotr Zalutsky, 49, and other members of the United Opposition people implicated in the Ryutin affair of 1932.

== January 11, 1937 (Monday) ==
- Adolf Hitler assured France that Germany had no intention of seizing the Kingdom of Morocco, at the time a French protectorate.
- Police in Flint, Michigan, armed with guns and tear gas, attempted to enter plant #2 of General Motors' Fisher Body company with the objective of breaking up the sit-down strike that had been called by the United Automobile Workers labor union on December 30. Strikers occupying the building pelted the police with bottles and bolts, and 14 miners were wounded by police gunfire before the police backed off. General Motors and the UAW would reach an agreement and the strike would end after 44 days on February 11.
- The United States invalidated all passports to Spain, in order to deter Americans from volunteering for the Spanish Civil War.
- The athletic directors of Brown University, Columbia University, Cornell University, Dartmouth College, Harvard University, the University of Pennsylvania, Princeton University and Yale University, institution in the northeastern United States known for their academic excellence and informally referred to as the Ivy League, voted to reject a proposal to create an athletic conference.
- Born:
  - Miguel Telles Antunes, Portuguese paleontologist for whom Lourinhasaurus antunesi, the Lourinhasaurus dinosaur is named. Other extinct species bearing his name are the weasel shark Paragaleus antunesi, the horse Equus caballus antunesi and the bird Fluviatilavis antunesi.
  - Chiemi Eri, Japanese actress and singer; in Tokyo (d. 1982)
- Died:
  - Maggie Browne (pen name for Margaret Hamer Andrewes), 72, English author of children's books, including Wanted, a King.
  - Katherine Raleigh, 84, English classicist, suffragist and tax resister.
  - William Stewart, 68, Scottish footballer who played primarily as a midfielder for Everton F.C. and Preston North End F.C. in the 19th century, as well as for the only British pro baseball league, the short-lived National League of Baseball of Great Britain, in 1890 as a right fielder for Preston North End Baseball Club
  - Nuri Conker, 56, Turkish military officer and politician.

== January 12, 1937 (Tuesday) ==
- U.S. President Roosevelt informed Congress of the largest plan up to that time for reorganization of the executive branch of the U.S. federal government, based on the report of the Brownlow Committee.
- The sinking of the Finnish cargo ship Johanna Thorden in the Pentland Firth in northern Scotland drowned 30 of the 38 crew.
- Western Air Express Flight 7 crashed into Los Pinetos Peak near Newhall, California, killing five of the 13 people aboard. The Boeing 247 was on a flight from Salt Lake City to Burbank, California, when it struck the mountain in bad weather. The documentary filmmakers Martin and Osa Johnson were on board and both were seriously injured, with Martin dying the next day. One of the survivors, passenger Arthur A. Robinson, hiked 5 miles (8.0 km) down the mountainside and alerted rescuers searching for the accident site.
- Born:
  - Shirley Eaton, British film actress known for Goldfinger and The Million Eyes of Sumuru; in Edgware, Middlesex
  - Reuben Snake (Kee-Kah Wah-Un-Gah), Native American Winnebago leader within the American Indian Movement, who nicknamed himself "Your Humble Serpent", known for lobbying for the passage of the 1994 American Indian Religious Freedom Act; in Winnebago, Nebraska (d. 1993)
- Died: Dorde Vajfert (born Georg Wiefert), 86, Serbian industrialist and banker

== January 13, 1937 (Wednesday) ==
- At the Temple of Heaven in Beijing, a crowd of 50,000 onlookers watched as authorities burned 10,000 ounces (280,000 g) of drugs and then executed 5 drug traffickers.
- The Royal Navy destroyer HMS Achates evacuated 212 civilians, including 58 women and children, from Gibraltar.
- Pope Pius XI left his sickbed for the first time in a month.
- Born:
  - Ati George Sokomanu, the first President of Vanuatu, from 1984 to 1989; on Mele, New Hebrides (now Vanuatu)
  - George Barr, American science fiction and fantasy artist; in Tucson, Arizona (d. 2025)
  - George Reisman, American economist; in New York City

== January 14, 1937 (Thursday) ==
- Hermann Göring held conferences in Rome with Benito Mussolini and Galeazzo Ciano to discuss policy toward the Spanish Civil War.
- The wooden statues that comprise Paul Bunyan and Babe the Blue Ox were unveiled in Bemidji, Minnesota, as a commemoration of the North American myth of Paul Bunyan.
- Born:
  - Princess Stella Sigcau of Mpondo, South African Minister of Public Enterprises, 1994 to 1999 and Minister of Public Works, 1999 to 2006, as well as Prime Minister of Transkei bantustan in 1987; in Lusikisiki, Eastern Cape province (d. 2006)
  - Ken Higgs, English cricketer; in Kidsgrove, Staffordshire (d. 2016)
  - Tom "Mongoo$e" McEwen, American drag racer (d. 2018)

== January 15, 1937 (Friday) ==
- The French Chamber of Deputies voted unanimously to give Prime Minister Léon Blum power to halt the flow of volunteers from or through France to fight in the Spanish Civil War.
- The Second Battle of the Corunna Road ended indecisively.
- Born:
  - Margaret O'Brien, American child actress known for Journey for Margaret, Meet Me in St. Louis and The Secret Garden; in San Diego
  - Yōhei Kōno, Speaker of the House of Representatives if Japan from 2003 to 2009, Foreign Minister of Japan 1994-1996 and 1999–2001, Deputy Prime Minister 1994 to 1995; in Hiratsuka, Kanagawa Prefecture
- Died: Pietro Biginelli, 76, Italian chemist who discovered the Biginelli reaction that creates 3,4-dihydropyrimidin-2(1H)-ones from ethyl acetoacetate, benzaldehyde and urea.

== January 16, 1937 (Saturday) ==
- Two days of voting in the Finnish presidential election concluded as voters in Finland selected 300 people to serve in the Electoral College that was scheduled to meet on February 15. Of the 300, 155 were committed to a particular candidate, with the choice for the college being President Pehr Evind Svinhufvud, incumbent Prime Minister Kyösti Kallio, or former President Kaarlo Juho Ståhlberg. Of the three, Kallio would be elected president on February 15.
- Five senior German Catholic bishops, along with the Vatican Secretary of State, Eugenio Pacelli, unanimously voted to ask Pope Pius XI to take a stand against Nazi Germany's increasing demands against the German Church. The Pope issued the papal encyclical Mit brennender Sorge ("With deep anxiety") to be used on March 14.
- Soirées musicales, a suite of five pieces composed by Benjamin Britten bringing together music by Gioachino Rossini, was performed for the first time, with the BBC Symphony Orchestra premiering it on BBC Radio's show BBC National Programme.
- The French Colonial Ministry confirmed reports that it was studying plans to offer land on Madagascar and other French colonies for settlement by Jews.

== January 17, 1937 (Sunday) ==
- A prison riot broke out near Guelph in Canada. Inmates started fires and fought police for ten hours until order was restored. An estimated $250,000 in damage was done and it was feared that 200 of the prison's 700 inmates had escaped.
- At a special meeting in Warsaw, the Stronnictwo Ludowe, a political party to champion the rights of farm laborers, voted to present demands to the Polish government and then to organize a strike of the nation's peasants. The strike itself would take place for 10 days in August.
- In Spain, Nationalist General Gonzalo Queipo de Llano led rebel troops to attack the Spanish government stronghold of Málaga, by first seizing Granada, Marbella, and Ronda. By February 8, the Nationalists would take the city and then carry out the massacre of thousands of civilian refugees.
- The Soviet Union sent Britain a note on the Spanish Civil War explaining that the Soviet government, although it "presently does not practice the dispatchment of volunteer detachments, does not consider it expedient to adopt unilateral prohibitive measures."
- The melodrama film Black Legion, starring Humphrey Bogart, premiered in New York City.
- Born: Salihu Modibbo Alfa Belgore, Chief Justice of Nigeria from 2006 to 2007; in Ilorin
- Died: Richard Boleslawski (stage name for Bolesław Ryszard Srzednicki), 47, Polish director and actor, died of a heart attack.

== January 18, 1937 (Monday) ==
- The Ohio River flood began when the river exceeded the flood stage of 52 feet (16 m). at Cincinnati as a result of heavy rains. The flood would ultimately kill 385 people along the river from Pittsburgh, Pennsylvania, to Cairo, Illinois.
- German Führer Adolf Hitler authorized the creation of Adolf Hitler Schools, special new schools for gifted boys 12 to 18 that would prepare them for the NS-Ordensburgen.
- All 25 crew of the German Navy transport Welle, a converted trawler, were killed when the ship foundered in the Bay of Kiel off of the coast of Fehmarn.
- General Motors de México (GMM) a subsidiary of the U.S. automobile manufacturer, produced the first Chevrolet truck assembled in Mexico.
- The CBS radio show Aunt Jenny's Real Life Stories, starring Edith Spencer in the title role, premiered at 1:45 p.m. Eastern Time as a 15-minute soap opera. Sponsored by Spry Vegetable Shortening, the show would run on CBS radio until November 16, 1956.
- Born:
  - John Hume, Northern Irish politician and Nobel Peace Prize laureate, in Derry, County Londonderry (d. 2020)
  - Yukio Endō, Japanese artistic gymnast; in Akita City (d. 2009)
- Died:
  - Saint Jaime Hilario Barbal, 39, Spanish Roman Catholic martyr who was arrested on charges of being a member of the Brothers of the Christian Schools, was executed by a Spanish government firing squad. He would be canonized as a saint of the Roman Catholic Church on November 21, 1999.
  - Charles Hayden, 66, American banker, multimillionaire and philanthropist, creator of the Charles Hayden Foundation. The Hayden Planetarium at the American Museum of Natural History, and the town of Hayden, Arizona, are named in his honor.
  - Malcolm C. Rorty, 61, American economist and statistician, co-founder of the Econometric Society and the National Bureau of Economic Research

== January 19, 1937 (Tuesday) ==
- Howard Hughes set a new transcontinental aviation record by flying from Los Angeles to New York in 7 hours, 28 minutes and 25 seconds.
- The British Parliament convened for its first session of the New Year. Anthony Eden gave a speech on the foreign situation saying that the future of the continent lay with Germany, who "has it in her power to influence a choice which will decide not only her fate, but that of Europe. If she chooses co-operation with other nations, full and equal co-operation, there is nobody in this country who will not assist wholeheartedly to remove misunderstandings and to make the way smooth for peace and prosperity."
- The conservation organization Ducks Unlimited was founded by publisher Joseph P. Knapp, Robert Winthrop, E. H. Low and other philanthropists.
- Radio Nacional de España (RNE), the official radio broadcaster of the Fascist-governed areas of Spain, was launched by the Spanish Nationalist government in Salamanca, originally as an operation of Generalissimo Francisco Franco's State Delegation for Press and Propaganda.
- In Venezuela, the city of Ciudad Ojeda was founded on the shore of Lake Maracaibo for oil company workers and their families who had lived in employee housing at Lagunillas de Agua, by order of President Eleazar López Contreras. As of 2005, the city had almost 129,000 residents.
- Nap Lajoie, Tris Speaker and Cy Young were elected to the Baseball Hall of Fame.
- In the U.S. state of Tennessee, the marriage of a 22-year-old man to a 9-year-old girl horrified newspaper and magazine readers and called attention to the lack of laws setting a minimum age for marriage. At the time, Tennessee law provided only that the parents of a child had to provide consent to the marriage.
- Born:
  - Giovanna Marini, Italian singer and songwriter; in Rome (d.2024)
  - Hassan Habibi, vice president of Iran from 1989 to 2001; in Tehran (d.2013)
  - Laurence Deonna, Swiss journalist and war correspondent; in Geneva (d.2023)
  - Günter Litfin, German tailor who was the first person to be killed by East German border police at the Berlin Wall; in Berlin, Nazi Germany (killed, 1961)
  - Joseph Nye, American political scientist, Assistant Secretary of Defense for International Security Affairs, in South Orange, New Jersey (d. 2025)

== January 20, 1937 (Wednesday) ==
- For the first time in the U.S., the presidential inauguration day took place on January 20 rather than on March 4, with the change mandated by the Twentieth Amendment to the United States Constitution. In addressing the crowd, Roosevelt said, "I see one-third of a nation ill-housed, ill-clad, ill-nourished," and called upon Americans to fight poverty.
- Ingrid Christensen of Norway became the first woman in recorded history to set foot on the mainland of Antarctica, followed by compatriots Lillemor Rachlew, Solveig Widerøe and Augusta Sofie. In 1935, Caroline Mikkelsen had stepped onto one of the Tryne Islands in Antarctic territory.
- British Army officer Norman Baillie-Stewart, convicted of espionage in 1933, was released from Maidstone Prison in England and emigrated to Nazi Germany.
- Born:
  - Stuart F. Feldman, American lobbyist and co-founder of Vietnam Veterans of America; in Philadelphia (d.2010)
  - Bailey Howell, American basketball player; in Middleton, Tennessee inducted into the Naismith Memorial Basketball Hall of Fame
  - Richard Graff, American winemaker; in Danville, California (killed 1998 in a plane crash)

== January 21, 1937 (Thursday) ==
- France placed an embargo on arms and volunteers in the Spanish Civil War.
- Music for Strings, Percussion and Celesta by Hungarian composer Béla Bartók premiered in Basel, Switzerland.
- A strike by longshoremen of the Maritime Federation of the Gulf Coast was settled after almost three months. Maritime Federation would merge with other labor unions to create the National Maritime Union in May.
- Cook's Night Out, one of the first cooking shows on television, was first broadcast, as a 15-minute feature on BBC Television from its sole station, in London. The description of the program in Radio Times was "Marcel Boulestin will demonstrate before the camera the making of the first of five dishes, each of which can be prepared as a separate dish, while the whole together make an excellent five-course dinner. In his first talk, M. Boulestin will demonstrate the cooking of an omelette."
- Born:
  - George Flynn, American composer and pianist; in Miles City, Montana
  - Zbigniew Bargielski, Polish composer and teacher; in Lomza
  - Elvira Petrozzi (Mother Elvira), Italian Roman Catholic nun who founded the Communità Cenacolo to minister to drug addicts; in Sora (d. 2023)
  - Max Emanuel Herzog, descendant of Bavarian royalty and heir to the Bavarian royal house since 1996; in Munich
- Died: Marie Provost, 38, Canadian-born film actress, died following complications from acute alcoholism.

== January 22, 1937 (Friday) ==
- The Ohio River flood left 41,000 people around Cincinnati homeless. The business district of Pittsburgh and part of Louisville, Kentucky were also flooded out.
- Born:
  - Joseph Wambaugh; American detective novelist and three time Edgar Award winner, as well as multiple true crime nonfiction books; in East Pittsburgh, Pennsylvania (d. 2025)
  - Ryan Davies, Welsh comedian of the duo Ryan and Ronnie; in Glanamman, Carmarthenshire, Wales (died of asthma attack, 1977)

== January 23, 1937 (Saturday) ==
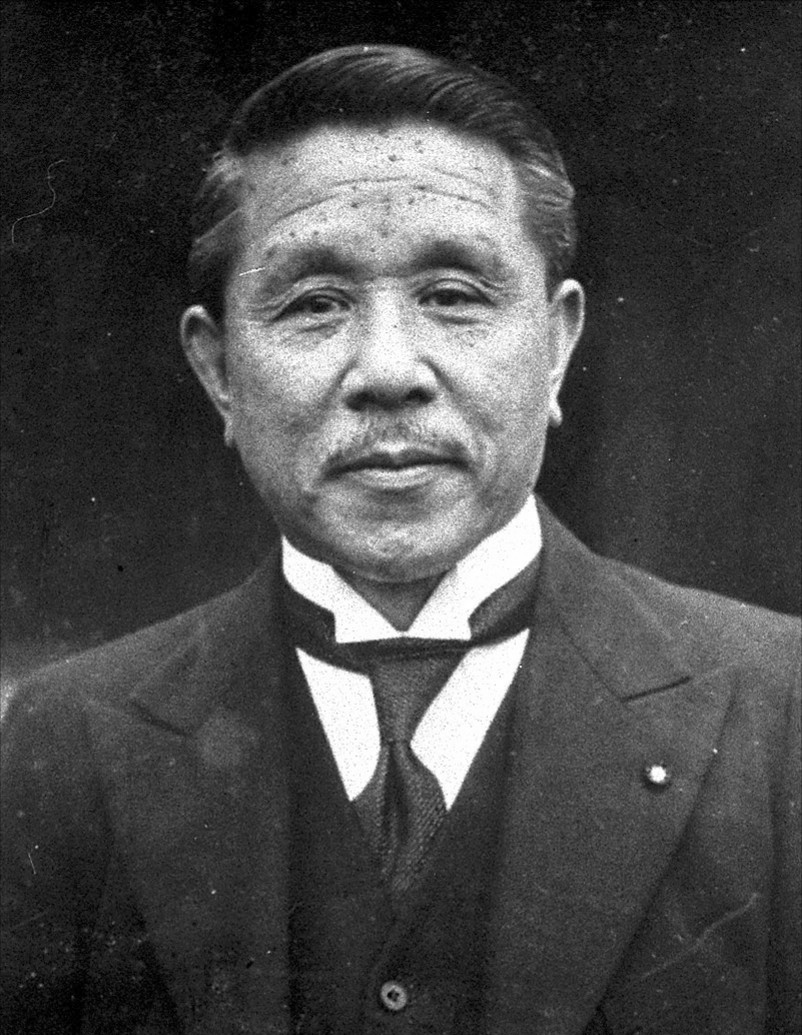
Prime Minister Hirota

- Japan's Prime Minister Kōki Hirota and his entire Japanese cabinet resigned due to a split between military leaders, and anti-military parliamentary members of the National Diet who thought that the army had too much influence over the government. Hirota was in sharp disagreement with the War Minister, General Hisaichi Terauchi over a speech made by Kunimatsu Hamada
- The second Moscow Trial began five months after the trial and execution of 16 former Soviet Communist Party leaders the previous August. The new defendants were 17 lesser communist leaders branded collectively as the Anti-Soviet Trotskyist Center (including economic administrator Georgy Pyatakov and highway administrator Leonid Serebryakov), who were charged with an anti-Stalin conspiracy.

== January 24, 1937 (Sunday) ==
- Prime Minister Milan Stojadinović of Yugoslavia and Prime Minister Georgi Kyoseivanov signed the "Treaty of Eternal Friendship".
- The Romanian language opera Horia, written by Nicolae Bretan with libretto by Ghita Popp, was performed for the first time, with the premiere taking place at the Romanian National Opera House in Cluj.
- Died: Andrew Jackson Montague, 74, U.S. Congressman for Virginia since 1912 and former Governor of Virginia from 1902 to 1906, died at his home after having been in poor health since winning re-election to a 13th term.

== January 25, 1937 (Monday) ==
- The soap opera The Guiding Light premiered on NBC Radio at 4:45 in the afternoon Eastern time, initially as "a story which details the experiences of a minister in a melting pot community." The show's title came from the lamp that the show's protagonist, the Reverend John Ruthledge (voiced by Arthur Peterson Jr.), would turn on in his parsonage to let people know that he was always available to counsel them. The radio show continued until June 29, 1956, running concurrently with a CBS television show which premiered on June 30, 1952, running for 54 years until its final episode on September 18, 2009, 72 years after the premiere of the radio show that began the series.
- A bus accident killed 23 of 32 passengers in the U.S. state of Florida, most of whom were tourists. The bus, operated by Tamiami Trail Tours, fell into a canal running alongside the Tamiami Trail road in the Florida Everglades.
- Born: Ange-Félix Patassé, Central African politician; in Paoua, Ubangi-Shari (now the Central African Republic) (d. 2011)
- Died:
  - Dimitri Navachine, 47, Russian economist and Soviet diplomat who guided the Soviet Union's financial matters until defecting to France in 1929, was stabbed to death while walking his dog in Paris.
  - Addison Burkhardt, 57, American playwright, screenwriter and lyricist, died of influenza.

== January 26, 1937 (Tuesday) ==
- The Ohio River reached a crest of 79.99 feet (24.38 m) as it reached Cincinnati. Most of the region on the river in southern Ohio, northern Kentucky and southeastern Indiana was without electricity.
- The Japanese military declined to accept General Kazushige Ugaki, the former Japanese Governor-General of Korea, as Prime Minister. To prevent Ugaki from forming a cabinet, the Imperial Army refused to allow any of its officers to serve as a Minister of War.
- The Greater Hamburg Act was passed in Germany, mandating the exchange of territories between Hamburg and the Free State of Prussia, effective April 1. Geesthacht and Cuxhaven were transferred to Prussia, while Altona, Wandsbek, and Harburg-Wilhelmsburg became part of Hamburg. The Free City of Lübeck was formally annexed to Prussia.
- Born: Joseph Saidu Momoh, President of Sierra Leone from 1985 to 1992; in Binkolo (d.2003)

== January 27, 1937 (Wednesday) ==
- The 1935 salaries of Hollywood movie stars were made public as part of a Congressional study on salaries paid by corporations. Greta Garbo topped the list at $332,500, followed by Wallace Beery ($278,749), Joan Crawford ($241,403), William Powell ($238,750) and Clark Gable ($211,553).
- Britain's Labour Party disassociated itself from the "Socialist League", a group of Labour MPs who sought to move Labour further to the left and had launched a "Unity Campaign" to bring British left-wing organizations into a united front against Fascism. Members of the League were given the choice of either quitting the Labour Party or quitting the Socialist League, and most opted to stay with Labour.
- Born: John Ogdon, English pianist and composer; in Mansfield Woodhouse, Nottinghamshire (d. 1989)

== January 28, 1937 (Thursday) ==
- In a National Hockey League game between the Montreal Canadiens and Chicago Black Hawks, Canadiens star Howie Morenz, nicknamed "The Stratford Streak", caught his skate in the boards and broke four bones in his leg. Morenz was hospitalized and would die five weeks later, on March 8, from a blood clot.
- Born:
  - Ken Hill, British playwright and director known for his musicals, including Phantom of the Opera; in Birmingham (d. 1995 from cancer)
  - Suman Kalyanpur, Indian singer; in Dhaka, Bengal Province, British India

== January 29, 1937 (Friday) ==
- The Japanese aircraft carrier Sōryū entered service.
- The drama film The Good Earth, based on the novel of the same name by Pearl S. Buck, premiered in Los Angeles.
- Born: Bobby Scott, American jazz musician, record producer and songwriter; in Mount Pleasant, New York (d. 1990)
- Died: Aleen Cust, 68, Irish veterinary surgeon

== January 30, 1937 (Saturday) ==
- On the fourth anniversary of becoming the Chancellor of Germany and leading his Nazi Party to control of the nation, Adolf Hitler said in a speech that Germany was renouncing Article 231 of the Treaty of Versailles, in which Germany accepted the blame for starting the First World War. On the same day, Hitler convened a meeting of his cabinet and issued a bill for approval by the Nazi parliament, "Law for the reorganization of relations between the Reichsbank and the Reichsbahn", nationalizing Germany's banks and its railways.
- Paul Freiherr von Eltz-Rübenach, the Reichspostminister (in charge of the postal service) and the Reichsminister für Verkehr (in charge of transportation) became the only remaining official in Hitler's cabinet who was not a member of the Nazi Party. At the cabinet meeting, Hitler personally presented the Golden Party Badge and party membership to those ministers not already enrolled. Eltz-Rübenach, a devout Roman Catholic who was concerned about the government's campaign against religion, declined the offer. He was told to submit his resignation. and was replaced two days later.
- The Trial of the Anti-Soviet Trotskyist Center ended, and 13 of the 17 defendants were sentenced to execution by firing squad.
- The Associated Press reported a total of 333 known deaths across eight U.S. states from the recent flooding. 225 of the deaths were in Kentucky.
- Born:
  - Vanessa Redgrave, British actress and political activist; in Greenwich, London
  - Boris Spassky, chess grandmaster and former world champion from 1969 to 1972; in Leningrad, USSR (d. 2025)
- Died: Georgy Pyatakov, 46, Ukrainian Communist leader, was executed.

== January 31, 1937 (Sunday) ==
- German führer Adolf Hitler issued a decree forbidding German nationals from accepting a Nobel Prize. The ban came shortly after the Nobel Foundation had awarded the Nobel Peace Prize to Carl von Ossietzky, one of Hitler's political opponents.
- Born:
  - Philip Glass, American composer; in Baltimore, Maryland
  - Suzanne Pleshette, American TV and film actress; in New York City (d. 2008)
