= Tryne Crossing =

Tryne Crossing (68°30′S 78°18′E) is a low but rough pass across Langnes Peninsula, Vestfold Hills, leading from the southwest arm of Tryne Fjord to Langnes Fjord. Used for portage and sledges and probably suitable for tracked vehicles. The area was mapped from air photos taken by the Lars Christensen Expedition (1936–37), and was photographed by U.S. Navy Operation Highjump (1946–47). First traversed by an ANARE (Australian National Antarctic Research Expeditions) party led by B.H. Stinear, May 13, 1957, and named for its association with Tryne Fjord.
