= February 1937 =

Month of 1937

<<	February 1937					>>
Su	Mo	Tu	We	Th	Fr	Sa
	1	2	3	4	5	6
7	8	9	10	11	12	13
14	15	16	17	18	19	20
21	22	23	24	25	26	27
28

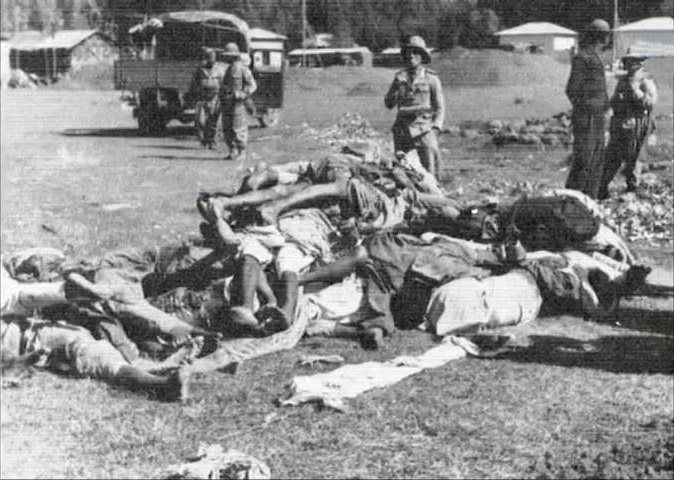
February 19, 1937: Yekatit 12 massacre of more than 19,000 Ethiopians begins...

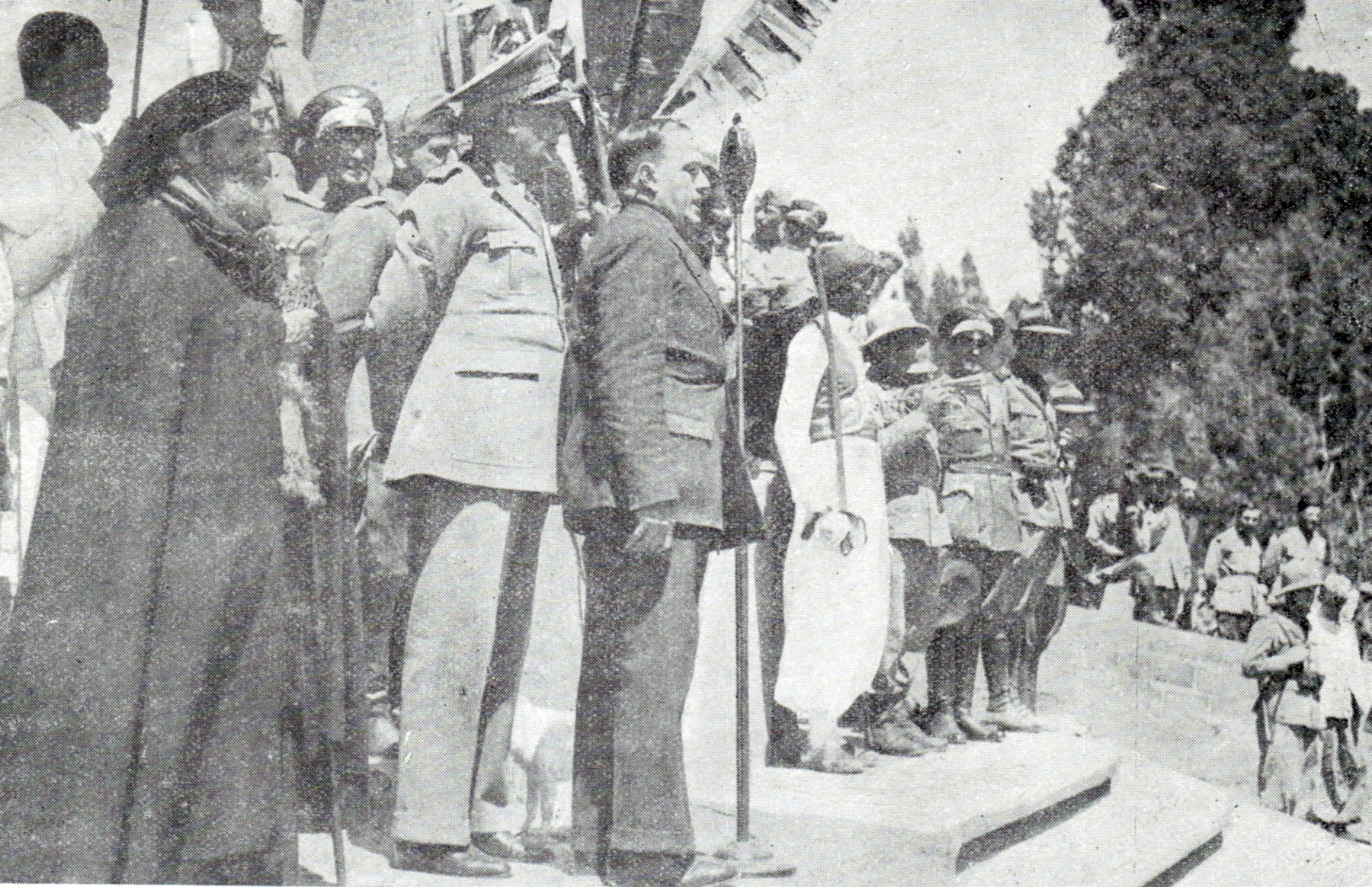
... after assassination attempt against Italian Governor-General Graziani

The following events occurred in February 1937:

== February 1, 1937 (Monday) ==
- King George VI released the British Empire's New Year Honours list, one month late due to the abdication crisis. Queen Elizabeth was made Dame Grand Cross of the Royal Victorian Order.
- Argentina defeated Brazil 2-0 at the Estadio Gasómetro in Buenos Aires to win the South American Championship of football. Six nations— Argentina, Brazil, Chile, Paraguay, Peru and Uruguay— had participated and both teams finished with W-D-L records of 4-0-1.
- The French aircraft manufacturer SNCASE (Société nationale des constructions aéronautiques du Sud-Est) was formed by the nationalization and merger of Lioré et Olivier, Potez, CAMS, Romano and SPCA.
- Born:
  - Don Everly, member of The Everly Brothers rock and roll duo; in Brownie, Kentucky (d. 2021)
  - Garrett Morris, African-American comedian and actor and part of the original cast of Saturday Night Live; in New Orleans, Louisiana
- Died:
  - Tony Marino, 26, American bantamweight boxer, died two days after being knocked out in his bout against Carlos "Indian" Quintana in Brooklyn. Marino's death, which came after he had been knocked to the canvas five times, led to the New York State Athletic Commission's emergency meeting and the passage of the innovative "three knockdown" rule to stop a fight.
  - Leonid Serebryakov, 46, and Nikolay Muralov, 59, former Soviet Communist Party officials and supporters of Leon Trotsky, were executed after being convicted of treason as part of the Great Purge ordered by Premier Joseph Stalin.

== February 2, 1937 (Tuesday) ==
- Senjūrō Hayashi formed a government as the new Prime Minister of Japan, replacing Kōki Hirota.
- The Royal Navy battleship HMS Royal Oak (08), patrolling the Mediterranean Sea to protect Britain's colony at Gibraltar, came under aerial attack from three aircraft operated by the Second Spanish Republic. Two of the three bombs exploded within 550 metres (1,800 ft) of the ship but caused no damage.
- General Motors obtained an injunction against the strike of the United Auto Workers with an order signed by Judge Edward S. Black. The order was soon set aside when a UAW investigation found that Black owned over 3,000 shares of General Motors stock, and the UAW made plans to expand to the strike to another GM factory.
- The engagement ceremony for Crown Prince Pujie of the Japanese puppet state of Manchukuo (consisting of northeastern China's Jilin, Heilongjiang, and Liaoning provinces) took place at the Manchukuo "embassy" in Tokyo. The wedding of Japanese princess Hiro Saga to Pujie, brother of the Emperor Puyi, was scheduled for April 3.
- Born: Tom Smothers, American comedian and one-half of the Smothers Brothers musical comedy team; in New York City (d. 2023)

== February 3, 1937 (Wednesday) ==
- The Battle of Málaga began as the Nationalist forces of Francisco Franco, supplemented by Fascists from Italy and Germany advanced on the city of Málaga and were met by 12,000 defenders fighting for the Second Spanish Republic. The rebel nationalists swept through the Republican defenses within five days.
- The 33rd International Eucharistic Congress opened in Manila, Philippines. It was the first eucharistic congress held in Asia.
- The "three knockdown rule", now universal in boxing competitions, was created by the New York State Athletic Commission, requiring a referee to stop a boxing bout after one of the boxers had been knocked down three times in a single round. Initially, the rule did not apply to fights for a championship, nor outside of the state of New York.
- Born:
  - Billy Meier, Swiss author and ufologist; in Bülach
  - Alex Young, Scottish footballer; in Loanhead, Midlothian (d. 2017)
- Died: Monroe Tsatoke, 32, Native American painter and muralist who was one of the "Kiowa Six" group of artists from the Kiowa Indian Tribe of Oklahoma, died of tuberculosis.

== February 4, 1937 (Thursday) ==
- The first television broadcast of a British sporting event took place as the BBC showed bouts from an international boxing tournament between England and Ireland from Alexandra Palace.
- Antarctica's Prince Harald Coast was first discovered by humans as Norwegian explorer Viggo Widerøe, pilot Nils Romnaes and Ingrid Christensen flew over the site during the Lars Christensen Expedition.
- Willie Gallacher, the lone Communist Party of Great Britain M.P., caused an uproar in the House of Commons when he asserted that the Regency Bill under discussion was clearly "directed towards the occupant of the Throne at the present time" (referring to King George VI) because he was "suspect." Conservative Member Earl Winterton jumped to his feet and declared that not even a Member "who represents so small an amount of opinion in the country" as Gallacher "should be permitted to get away with the monstrous assertion which he has just made", and said it "could only have come from someone who approaches the subject with a distorted brain."
- German ambassador to Britain Joachim von Ribbentrop committed a social gaffe when he gave the Nazi salute to George VI, nearly knocking over the king who was stepping forward to shake Ribbentrop's hand.
- Born:
  - Magnar Solberg, Norwegian biathlete and Olympic gold medalist in the 20 km race in 1968 and 1972; in Soknedal
  - George Argyros, U.S. Ambassador to Spain 2001 to 2004 and co-owner of baseball's Seattle Mariners from 1981 to 1989; in Detroit

== February 5, 1937 (Friday) ==
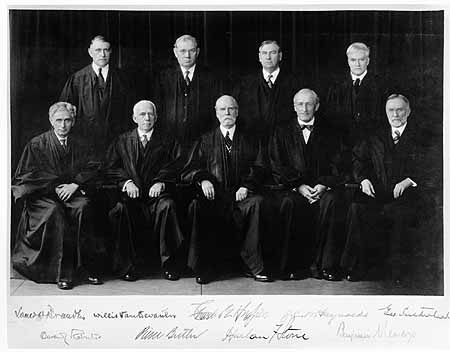
The Court in early 1937; all five justices in the front row (Brandeis, Van Devanter, Chief Justice Hughes, McReynolds and Sutherland) and Justice Butler (2nd from left in back were 70 years old or older

- The Judicial Procedures Reform Bill was recommended by U.S. President Franklin D. Roosevelt in a surprise message to Congress, recommending a drastic revision of the Supreme Court. The plan would increase the number of judges from 9 to as many as 15, and provided that each time one of the justices reached the age of 70 and did not retire, another seat would be added to the Court. Given that six of the nine Supreme Court justices were already at least 70 years old (Pierce Butler, 70; Chief Justice Charles Evans Hughes and George Sutherland, both 74; James McReynolds, 75; Willis Van Devanter, 77; and Louis Brandeis, 80), the idea failed and was derided as "court packing" as an attempt by President Roosevelt to gain more control over the Court with his own appointees.
- The first television broadcast of a work of William Shakespeare took place as the British Broadcasting Corporation telecast Act 3, Scene 2 of As You Like It, followed by a portion of Henry V.
- The constitution of the Republic of Turkey was amended to incorporate "The Six Arrows" (Republicanism, Folkism, Nationalism, Laicism, Statism, and Reformism).
- Born: Larry Hillman, Canadian ice hockey defenceman who played on 15 different teams in 22 seasons and helped Detroit, Toronto and Montreal win the Stanley Cup and Winnipeg to win the WHA Avco World Trophy; in Kirkland Lake, Ontario (d. 2022)
- Died: Lou Andreas-Salomé, 75, Russian-born psychoanalyst and author

== February 6, 1937 (Saturday) ==
- The Battle of Jarama began as the Spanish Nationalists and their allies crossed the Jarama River, the last line of defense on the eastern side of the Spanish capital of Madrid. The Nationalists moved toward controlling the road between Madrid and Valencia, Spain's port on the Mediterranean Sea. The battle lasted for three weeks.
- Benito Mussolini's 20-year-old son Vittorio married Orsola Buvoli in Rome. About 1,000 people stood in the rain outside the church to view the comings and goings.

== February 7, 1937 (Sunday) ==
- A crowd of 40,000 leftists marched in Paris in observance of the third anniversary of the 6 February 1934 counter-demonstrations. Prime Minister Léon Blum stood in the rain to review them.
- Born:
  - Jacques Saadé, Lebanese-born French businessman who founded (in 1978) the Compagnie maritime d’affrètement shipping container company (now CMA CGM), fourth largest in the world; in Beirut (d. 2018)
  - Fred Gillett, American astronomer; in Minot, North Dakota (d. 2001)
- Died:
  - Elihu Root, 91, U.S. Secretary of War from 1899 to 1904 during the Philippine War, later the U.S. Secretary of State from 1905 to 1909, 1912 Nobel Peace Prize laureate
  - Swami Akhandananda, 72, Indian monk of the Ramakrishna Mission of Hinduism

== February 8, 1937 (Monday) ==
- As the Spanish Nationalists captured the city of Málaga, at least 15,000 civilians fled toward the Republican held city of Almeria on the N-340 highway. In retaliation for the citizens' resistance to Generalissimo Franco's invasion, the Nationalist battleships Canarias, Almirante Cerveras and Baleares fired artillery shells from the Mediterranean Sea and killed at least 3,000 civilians, mostly elderly people, children, women and persons already injured.
- Born: Manfred Krug, East German film star and West German TV actor and singer; in Duisburg (d. 2016)

== February 9, 1937 (Tuesday) ==
- All 11 people on United Air Lines Flight 33 were killed when the Douglas DC-3 crashed into San Francisco Bay. With eight passengers and three crew, the airliner was approaching the Mills Field Airport in San Francisco at the end of a two-hour flight from Los Angeles and was cleared for landing at 8:44 pm. The crash was the first to involve a DC-3.
- Born:
  - William Lawvere, American mathematician known for Lawvere's fixed-point theorem and for the category of Lawvere theory sets; in Muncie, Indiana (d. 2023)
  - Clete Boyer, American baseball player with 16 Major League Baseball seasons and three in the Japan League; in Cassville, Missouri (d. 2007)

== February 10, 1937 (Wednesday) ==
- The first issue of Detective Comics, which would introduce Batman the following year and would give DC Comics its name, was put on newsstands by the National Allied Publications Company, owned by Malcolm Wheeler-Nicholson, and had a cover date of March 1937.
- The Leningrad suburb of Detskoye Selo, formerly Tsarskoye Selo, was formally renamed Pushkin in ceremonies marking the 100th anniversary of the 1837 death of Russian poet, playwright and novelist Alexander Pushkin.
- A German appeals court ruled that children who failed to live up to the mental and physical standards of Nazi education could be taken away from their families and placed in state-run homes.
- Born:
  - Roberta Flack, American singer and winner of two consecutive Grammy Awards for Record of the Year; in Black Mountain, North Carolina (d. 2025)
  - Anne Anderson, Scottish reproductive physiologist; in Forres, County of Moray (d. 1983)
- Died: Ali-Akbar Davar, 51, Iranian jurist who reformed Iran's judicial system, committed suicide with an overdose of opium, after being reprimanded by Reza Shah, the Iranian monarch.

== February 11, 1937 (Thursday) ==
- The Flint sit-down strike ended when General Motors agreed to recognize the United Auto Workers as the exclusive bargaining agent for GM employees.
- Concluding a three-day celebration of Fascism in Romania by supporters of the Legion of the Iron Guard (Garda de Fier), the funerals of Ion Moța and Vasile Marin were conducted in Bucharest. Iron Guard leader Corneliu Zelea Codreanu had coordinated the event for Moța and Marin, who had been killed in a Spanish Civil War battle on January 13, by routing the funeral train on a tour of Romania rather than having the bodies of the "martyrs" taken directly to Bucharest.
- Joachim von Ribbentrop formally presented the British Foreign Office with a demand for the return of Germany's colonies.
- An issue of the British weekly news magazine Cavalcade was banned for running an article referring to rumors of the king having suffered an attack of epilepsy.
- Aviator Amelia Earhart announced she would attempt to circumnavigate the globe as close to the equator as possible.
- Born:
  - Bill Lawry, Australian cricketer with 219 caps for the Australia national cricket team; in Thornbury, Victoria
  - Eddie Shack, popular Canadian ice hockey player celebrated in the song "Clear the Track, Here Comes Shack"; in Sudbury, Ontario (d. 2020)
- Died:
  - Walter Burley Griffin, 60, American architect, died of peritonitis in British India, five days after gall bladder surgery at King George's Hospital, Lucknow in Lucknow.
  - Pedro de Jesús Maldonado, 44, Mexican priest and Roman Catholic saint canonized in 2000, died the day after suffering a traumatic brain injury from a beating by a gang.

== February 12, 1937 (Friday) ==
- The International Brigades halted the Nationalist advance at Jarama.
- The Cleveland Rams, second place finishers in the rival American Football League and owned by a consortium of businessmen headed by Homer Marshman, were granted a franchise in the NFL for the 1937 NFL season. The team would move to the west coast in 1946 and is now the Los Angeles Rams.
- The musical film When You're in Love starring Grace Moore and Cary Grant was released.
- Born:
  - Charles Dumas, U.S. Olympic champion high jumper, 1956 gold medalist, who was the first person to clear 7.00 feet (2.13 m) in the high jump; in Tulsa, Oklahoma (d. 2004)
  - Vittorio Emanuele di Sovia, the last Crown Prince of Italy and one-time pretender to the throne as the only son of King Umberto II; in Naples (d. 2024). But for the abolition of the Italian monarchy, he would have become King Victor Emmanuel IV in 1983.
  - Charles Jackson, American serial killer who murdered at least seven women and one man around San Francisco between 1975 and 1982; in rural Louisiana (d. 2002)
- Died: Christopher Caudwell (pen name for Christopher St John Sprigg), 29, British Marxist writer, was killed in the Spanish Civil War.

== February 13, 1937 (Saturday) ==
- A theater fire at the Manchu Wutai Playhouse in the city of Andong killed at least 658 people who were among 7,500 celebrating the Chinese New Year, which began on February 11. The blaze, which started at 7:30 in the evening in the capital of the Andong Province of Manchukuo, the Japanese-occupied puppet state in northeastern China, was traced to "a carelessly placed candle behind a screen" and "spread with such speed" that "a balcony collapsed a few minutes after the fire had started, plunging screaming, fighting hundreds on top of the frenzied spectators on the lower floor".
- National Football League owners voted to approve the move, announced in December by owner George Preston Marshall, of the Boston Redskins to Washington, D.C. where the team would become the Washington Redskins (now the Washington Commanders). The move had been announced by Marshall on December 16, shortly after the Redskins had lost the 1936 NFL championship game to the Green Bay Packers.
- Felix Kaspar of Austria won the men's competition of the World Figure Skating Championships in Vienna.
- Born:
  - Rupiah Banda, President of Zambia from 2008 to 2011; in Gwanda, Southern Rhodesia (d. 2022)
  - Sigmund Jähn, the first German to travel into outer space; in Morgenröthe-Rautenkranz (d. 2019) Jähn, a pilot in the East German Air Force, was part of the crew of Soyuz 31 launched to the Salyut 6 space station in 1978.
  - Hiroshi Ninomiya, Japanese footballer, manager of the Japan national team from 1976 to 1978; in Tokyo
  - Angelo Mosca, American professional football player and wrestler enshrined at the Canadian Football Hall of Fame; in Waltham, Massachusetts (d. 2021)

== February 14, 1937 (Sunday) ==
- A Nationalist warship shelled the Republican capital of Valencia for 30 minutes until counterfire from shore batteries forced its retreat.
- Austrian Chancellor Kurt Schuschnigg indicated that a referendum on the question of restoring the Habsburg monarchy might be held.
- The first installment of the newspaper comic strip Prince Valiant, written and drawn by Hal Foster, was printed as a Sunday comics feature in the Hearst newspapers. The fantasy adventure, set in the Middle Ages, has continued weekly as a continuous story.
- Born: Magic Sam (stage name for Samuel G. Maghett), African-American blues musician; in Grenada, Mississippi (d. 1969)

== February 15, 1937 (Monday) ==
- Finland's electoral college of 300 representatives met in Helsinki to select the President of Finland. With 151 votes needed for the majority win, former president Kaarlo Juho Ståhlberg fell one vote short, with 150, while incumbent President Pehr Evind Svinhufvud was second with 94, and Prime Minister Kyösti Kallio had 56. On the second round, almost all of Ståhlberg's supporters deserted him and switched their allegiance to Kallio, who received 177 votes, compared to 104 for Svinhufvud and only 19 for Ståhlberg.
- In Australia, an underground explosion in a coal mine in Wonthaggi, Victoria, killed 13 men.
- Flooding killed 11 people around southern Los Angeles.
- Born: Zoltán Peskó, Hungarian composer and conductor at Milan's Teatro alla Scala; in Budapest (d. 2020)

== February 16, 1937 (Tuesday) ==
- American chemist Wallace Carothers of the DuPont company received U.S. patent No. 2,071,250 for "monocomponent artificial filaments or the like of synthetic polymers", marketed by DuPont as the first synthetic fabric, nylon.
- The popular ballet Les Patineurs, choreographed by Frederick Ashton with music composed by Giacomo Meyerbeer and arranged by Constant Lambert, premiered at Sadler's Wells Theatre and was performed by the Vic-Wells Ballet.
- Le Voyageur sans bagage (Traveller Without Luggage), a play by Jean Anouilh, premiered in Paris at the Théâtre des Mathurins.
- To celebrate the birth of Vittorio Emanuele, Prince of Naples, grandson of King Victor Emanuel III and second in line for the throne, Prime Minister Benito Mussolini proclaimed a general amnesty cancelling or reducing prison sentences for many types of offences.
- Born:
  - Yuri Manin, Russian mathematician known for the Gauss–Manin connection; in Simferopol, Crimean ASSR, Soviet Union (d. 2023)
  - John Willcox, English rugby union fullback for the England national team and for the British Lions; in Sutton Coldfield, Warwickshire
- Died: Rodmond Roblin, 84, Canadian businessman and politician who served as Premier of Manitoba from 1900 to 1915

== February 17, 1937 (Wednesday) ==
- Ten men working on construction of the Golden Gate Bridge in San Francisco fell to their deaths when a section of scaffolding collapsed. The debris from the scaffold cut through a safety net beneath the bridge. Only two workmen survived the fall.
- Norway's national ice hockey team played its first international game, participating in the 1937 world championships in London and losing to Czechoslovakia, 7 to 0. The next day, Norway lost to its other opponent in Group B, being defeated by Switzerland, 13 to 2.
- Born:
  - Mary Ann Mobley, American actress who won the Miss America 1959 beauty pageant; in Brandon, Mississippi (d. 2014)
  - Bjørn Wiik, Norwegian elementary particle physicist; in Bruvik (d.1999)

== February 18, 1937 (Thursday) ==
- Six U.S. Marines were killed and 10 injured in a shell explosion aboard the battleship USS Wyoming during military exercises off the coast of San Clemente Island.
- Film actress Mary Astor and film editor Manuel del Campo were married in Yuma, Arizona.
- Died: Horatio Clarence Hocken, 79, Canadian politician and founder of the Toronto Star newspaper

== February 19, 1937 (Friday) ==
- The Yekatit 12 massacre of more than 19,000 Ethiopians began in Addis Ababa shortly after General Rodolfo Graziani, the Governor-General of Italian East Africa was wounded in an assassination attempt by two Ethiopian nationalists, Abraha Deboch and Mogus Asgedom. Ten grenades were thrown onto a reviewing stand where Italian and Ethiopian officials were sitting during a parade. Graziani was rushed to a hospital immediately after 365 fragments from the grenade pierced his body. Italian Air Force General Aurelio Liotta and Archbishop Abuna Qerellos IV, leader of the Ethiopian Orthodox Church and Vice-Governor General Armando Petretti, were also wounded, along with 25 other people.
- In reprisal, the Italian colonial government murdered thousands of Ethiopians over the next three days. A detailed examination would conclude later that 19,200 people were killed. The massacre is referred to as "Yekatit 12" based on the date of February 19, 1937, being Yekatit 12, 1929 AM on the Ethiopian calendar.
- The last of the Ethiopian resistance was crushed on the same day at the Battle of Gogetti, where the last Arbegnoch fighters were encircled near Lake Shala and exterminated.
- Five of the seven people on an Airlines of Australia flight were killed when the City of Brisbane (VH-UHH), a Stinson Model A, crashed into a mountain in the McPherson Range. The flight had departed Brisbane in Queensland at 1:00 in the afternoon and was on its way to a stop in Lismore, New South Wales, with a final destination of Sydney.
- The red, white and blue colours of the flag of the Netherlands were confirmed by royal decree.
- Born: Robert Walker, American blues musician; near Clarksdale, Mississippi (d. 2017)
- Died: Major General Beyene Merid, 39, Ethiopian Army leader and anti-Fascist resistance leader, killed at the battle of Gogetti.

== February 20, 1937 (Saturday) ==
- Paraguay gave notice of its intent to withdraw from the League of Nations.
- German Fuhrer Adolf Hitler opened an auto show in Berlin featuring three test models of the Volkswagen.
- Born:
  - Robert Huber, German biochemist and 1988 Nobel laureate; in Munich
  - Roger Penske, American race car driver and businessman, founder of the Penske Corporation that includes a truck leasing company and multiple auto dealerships, as well as owner of the Indianapolis Motor Speedway; in Shaker Heights, Ohio
  - Nancy Wilson, American jazz singer and three-time Grammy Award winner; in Chillicothe, Ohio (d. 2018)
  - Robert Evans, Australian amateur astronomer and Protestant minister known for having discovered 42 different supernovas; in Sydney (d. 2022)
  - George Leonardos, Egyptian historical novelist; in Alexandria
- Died:
  - Barlow Carkeek, 58, Australian cricketer with 101 caps for the Australia national team, as well as playing Australian rules football for Essendon in the Victorian Football League, died after being struck by a car while crossing a street in East Brighton, Victoria.
  - Rua Kenana Hepetipa, 67, New Zealand Māori religious leader and rights activist who claimed to be a prophet of the Ringatū religion

== February 21, 1937 (Sunday) ==
- The first successful flying car, the Waterman Arrowbile, made its first flight. Built by Waldo Waterman, the vehicle was an airplane with wings that could be removed so that it could be driven on the road.
- Nearly 40,000 Republican militia in Spain launched an attack on Oviedo.
- The Italian Army captured the leader of the Ethiopian resistance, Desta Damtew. Damtew was executed three days later.
- The government of the Second Spanish Republic dismissed General José Asensio Torrado after the fall of Málaga to the Nationalists.
- France closed its border with Spain to keep foreign fighters and weapons out of the Spanish Civil War.
- Born:
  - Harald V, King of Norway 1991 to 2026; in Skaugum to King Olav V of Norway and Princess Märtha of Sweden (d. 2026)
  - Ron Clarke, Australian athlete and distance runner who held the world records for the 5000m race (1965-1966) and the 10,000m (1963-1965), as well as for two, three, six and ten miles; in Melbourne (d. 2015)
  - Bill Stall, American journalist and Pulitzer Prize winner, as well as press secretary for the Governor of California; in Philadelphia (d. 2008)
  - Georgy Prokopenko, Soviet Ukrainian swimmer and Olympian, holder of two world records in the 100m breaststroke; in Kobeliaky, Ukrainian SSR, Soviet Union (d. 2021)
  - Sabitri Chatterjee, Indian stage and film actress; in Comilla, Bengal Province, British India (now part of Bangladesh)

== February 22, 1937 (Monday) ==
- Italian Premier Benito Mussolini decreed that any native chieftain or officer who opposed Italian colonial troops, even in territory as yet unoccupied, would be put to death.
- Born: Tommy Aaron, American professional golfer who won the 1973 Masters Tournament; in Gainesville, Georgia
- Died:
  - James P. Buchanan, 69, American politician, U.S. Representative for Texas since 1913, died shortly after being sworn in for his 13th term.
  - Robert Hilliard, 32, Irish Olympic boxer, died after being wounded in action five days earlier while fighting in the International Brigades in the Spanish Civil War.
  - Maud O'Farrell Swartz, 57, Irish-born American labor leader who served as the president of the Women's Trade Union League, and who had been New York state secretary of labor since 1931.

== February 23, 1937 (Tuesday) ==
- Britain's battleship HMS Royal Oak (08) came under attack for a second time during the Spanish Civil War and was accidentally struck by an anti-aircraft shell fired from the Republican side that was defending Valencia from an attack by Francisco Franco's Nationalists. Captain T. B. Drew and four other men on Royal Oak were injured.
- Italy protested to Britain for inviting Haile Selassie to send an envoy to the king's coronation ceremony.
- A portion of the dismembered body of the seventh known victim of the Cleveland Torso Murderer was found on Euclid Beach at 156th Street, after having been washed up from Lake Erie. As with several of the killer's prior victims, the body of "Jane Doe #1" had been mutilated, with head and limbs removed, with only the torso remaining. Another portion of the torso would be found three months later, but the identity of the victim was indeterminable.
- Murray Murdoch of the New York Rangers became the first player in NHL history to appear in 500 consecutive games.
- Born: Claude Brown, African-American author known for his 1965 autobiographical book Manchild in the Promised Land; in Harlem, New York City (d. 2002)

== February 24, 1937 (Wednesday) ==
- Cebu City was created in the Commonwealth of the Philippines by the merger of the municipalities of Cebu, El Pardo, Mabolo, Talamban, Banilad, and San Nicolas.
- In the Battle of Jarama, Republicans tried to take strategic Pingarrón Hill southeast of Madrid but were pushed back.
- Ottorino Respighi's opera Lucrezia was given its first performance, premiering at La Scala in Milan.
- Died:
  - Desta Damtew, 45, leader of Ethiopian resistance, was executed.
  - Humphrey Pearson, 43, American screenwriter and playwright, was shot in the chest at his home in Palm Springs, California.
  - Guy Standing, 63, English stage and film actor
  - Patrick Burns, 80, Canadian businessman and multimillionaire who was one of "The Big Four" who controlled the meatpacking industry in Canada, as well as a rancher who owned 2,800 square kilometres (1,100 sq mi) of cattle ranches in the Canadian province of Alberta

== February 25, 1937 (Thursday) ==
- The U.S. state of Kansas became the 28th, and last, state to ratify the proposed Child Labor Amendment, which would have been the 22nd Amendment to the U.S. Constitution had ratification been complete. Although 28 of the 48 states at the time were required to ratify, the proposed amendment fell 8 states short of the 3/4ths majority (36 of 48) required. The amendment which would have provided for the U.S. government to regulate child labor, would become a moot point the following year after the passage of the more comprehensive Fair Labor Standards Act of 1938, upheld as constitutional by the U.S. Supreme Court in 1941.
- The British liner Llandovery Castle was sailing from Gibraltar to Marseille carrying 100 passengers when it hit a naval mine off Cap de Creus. A large hole was torn in its hull, but it managed to limp to Port-Vendres.
- Born:
  - Tom Courtenay, English stage, film and TV actor, winner of three BAFTA Awards and a Golden Globe Award; in Kingston upon Hull, East Yorkshire
  - Bob Schieffer, U.S. television reporter and news anchor; in Austin, Texas
  - Reuven Ramaty, Hungarian-born U.S. astrophysicist for NASA who developed the High Energy Solar Spectroscopic Imager renamed in his honor after his death and used on the Explorer 81 mission from 2002 to 2018; in Temesvár (d.2001)
  - Alexander Ilečko, Slovak sculptor; in Bratislava, Czechoslovakia (d. 2023)
- Died: Mary Pownall, 74, British sculptor

== February 26, 1937 (Friday) ==
- The John Steinbeck novella Of Mice and Men was released. A review in the Chicago Daily Tribune said that the book was written "so simply, so movingly, so factually that only when its last page is finished does the reader realize what a remarkable feat John Steinbeck has performed."
- The play The Ascent of F6, by W. H. Auden and Christopher Isherwood, premiered at the Mercury Theatre in London. In the two-act drama, "F6" was a mountain that had yet to be climbed and which was on the border of a British colony and the fictional nation of "Ostnia", both of which were attempting to be the first to reach the mountain's summit. Auden dedicated the play to his brother John Bicknell Auden, who was working on a British plan to ascend K2, located on the border between British India and China, as well as the second-highest mountain on Earth.
- Polish mountaineers Stefan Osiecki and Witold Paryski became the first persons to ascend the 21,749 feet (6,629 m) mountain Nevado Tres Cruces Central, a dormant volcano located in the South American nation of Chile.
- On the same day, Polish made first persons to ascend the 22,615 feet (6,893 m) dormant volcano Ojos del Salado, the highest volcano on Earth and the highest mountain in Chile.
- Born:
  - Lieutenant-Colonel Patrick Chukwuma Nzeogwu, Nigerian Army officer who led the failed attempt to overthrow the President of Nigeria in 1966; in Kaduna, British Nigeria (executed 1967)
  - Alejandra Meyer, Mexican film and television actress; in Tuxtla Gutiérrez, Chiapas state (d.2007)
  - Noureddine Diwa (Noureddine Ben Yahmed), Tunisian footballer with 23 caps for the Tunisia national team; in Tunis (d.2020)
- Died: General Géraud Réveilhac, 86, French Army officer relieved of command during World War One for the "Souain corporals affair", his order for the execution of four corporals randomly selected from 24 in 1915.

== February 27, 1937 (Saturday) ==
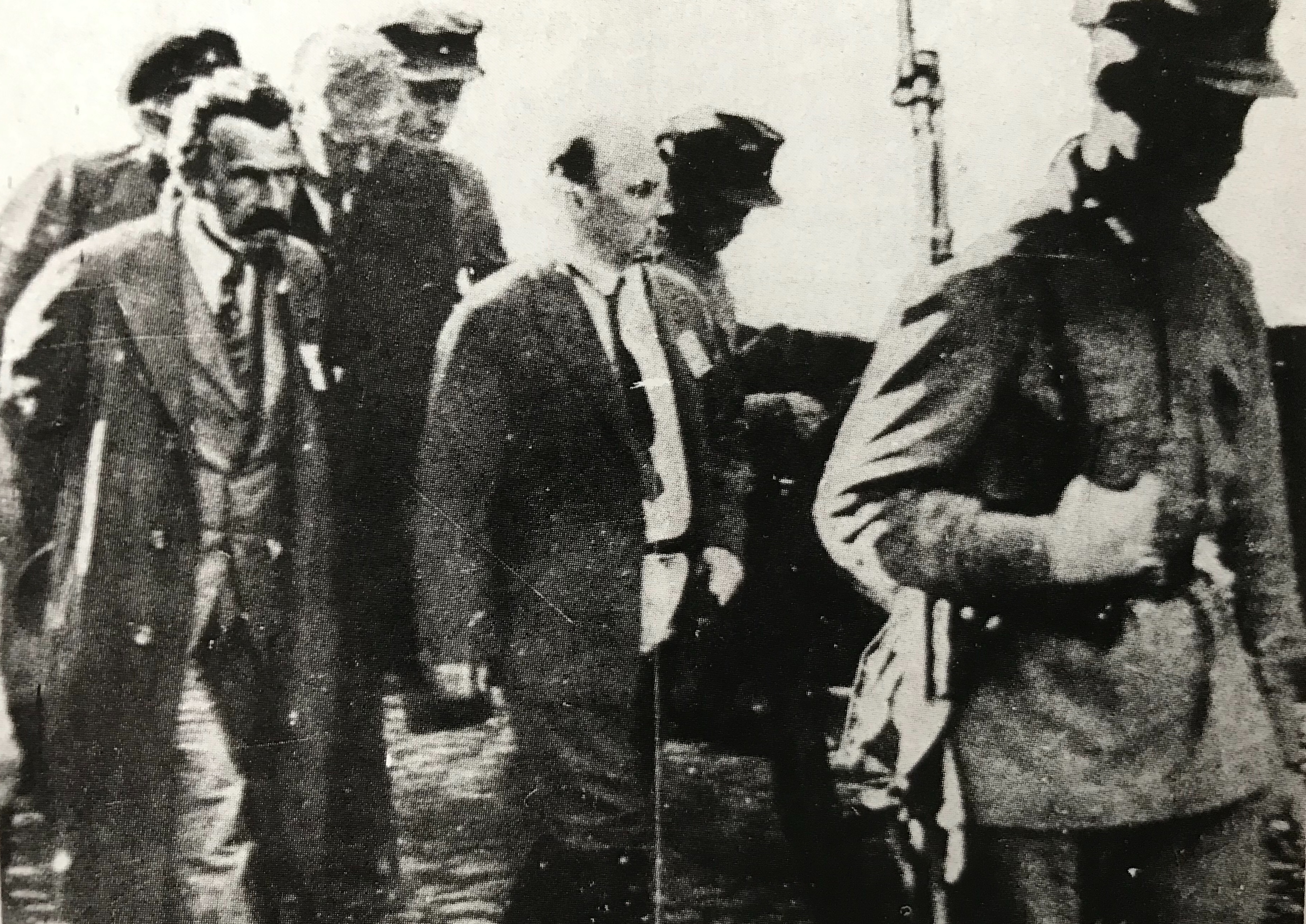
Rykov and Bukharin being brought to trial after their arrest

- Alexei Rykov and Nikolai Bukharin became the latest former Soviet Politburo members to be arrested as part of the Great Purge conducted by Communist Party General Secretary Joseph Stalin. The two men were taken into custody after being summoned to appear before the Party's Central Committee, and were charged with conspiring to overthrow the Soviet state. Rykov had been the Premier of the Soviet Union from 1924 to 1930, while Bukharin had been the General Secretary of Communist International from 1926 to 1929. Both had been full members of the Communist Party's Politburo until 1930. The two would both be executed a year later, on March 15, 1938, after being convicted of treason in the trial of 21 of the leaders of the Bolshevik Revolution.
- The French government passed a new defense plan extending the Maginot Line.
- The Battle of Jarama ended after three weeks with the Army of the Second Republic having prevented the rebel Nationalists from seizing the road between Madrid and Valencia, but still controlling the west bank of the Jarama River. Both the Nationalists and the Republicans had sustained thousands of dead and wounded in the battle in the Spanish Civil War.
- Canada won the World Ice Hockey Championships, held in London, the day after handing Great Britain its only loss, 3 to 0, and finishing with a record of 3-0-0 in a 2 to 1 win in overtime over Switzerland in the four-team round robin finals.
- Born:
  - David Goldman, British entrepreneur and co-founder of the Sage Group, the UK's largest software company and its second largest technology company; in Sunderland, County Durham(d. 1999)
  - Barbara Love, American feminist writer and LGBT rights activist; in Ridgewood, New Jersey(d. 2022)
- Died:
  - Charles Donnelly, 22, Irish poet and activist, was killed in the Spanish Civil War.
  - Edward Nockels, 67, American labor union organizer and leader of the Chicago Federation of Labor since 1903

== February 28, 1937 (Sunday) ==
- Spanish Foreign Minister Julio Álvarez del Vayo scolded the European democracies for "lamentable weakness ... in the face of the tactics of Fascist nations to make themselves masters of the continent." Álvarez del Vayo declared that "the defense of Madrid is the defense of Paris and London tomorrow."
- Died:
  - Harrington Mann, 72, Scottish painter
  - John Grimshaw Wilkinson, 81, British botanist who "was visually impaired and was able to recognise individual plants by using his tongue to detect shape and texture."
