= Barrier island (disambiguation) =

A barrier island is a type of sand island that protects the coastline.

Barrier island may also refer to:

- Barrier Island (Antarctica)
- Great Barrier Island, New Zealand
- Little Barrier Island, New Zealand

== See also ==
- Category:Barrier islands
