= Tryne Sound =

Body of water in Antarctica

Tryne Sound (68°25′S 78°25′E) is a short, narrow passage on the north side of Langnes Peninsula, Vestfold Hills, connecting Tryne Bay and Tryne Fjord. Mapped by Norwegian cartographers from air photos taken by the Lars Christensen Expedition (1936–37) and named Tryne Sund (snout sound).
