= Lillemor Rachlew =

Norwegian polar explorer (1902–1983)

Lillemor Rachlew on board ship in Antarctica, 1936-37

Ingebjørg Lillemor Rachlew (née Enger; 7 January 1902 – 14 May 1983) was a Norwegian Antarctic explorer. In 1937, she was one of four Norwegian women - Rachlew, Ingrid Christensen, Augusta Sofie Christensen, and Solveig Widerøe - who were the first women to set foot on the Antarctic mainland. The Four Ladies Bank, a submarine bank north of Prydz Bay was named after them.

On an earlier voyage to Antarctica, Rachlew took photographs which were published in 1934. Some sections from her diary were preserved and these are the earliest examples of a woman's writing about her travels in Antarctica.

== Personal life ==
Ingebjørg Lillemor Enger was born on 7 January 1902 to Eugenie Marie Mejdell and Ivar Enger, owner-director of Norma Precision and brother of entrepreneur Johan Enger. In 1928 she married ex-naval officer Cato Rachlew (1883-1968), who had been on an Arctic expedition organised by the Duke of Orléans in 1907. He was a Norwegian naval attaché in London from 1917 to 1919, and stayed there some years as a representative of Norwegian paper and pulp companies. Lillemor Rachlew did charity work in London during the Great Depression before the couple moved back to Norway around 1932.

== Antarctica ==
Rachlew joined two Antarctic expeditions undertaken by whaling fleet owner Lars Christensen and his wife Ingrid Christensen on the tanker Thorshavn, one in 1933 and one in 1936–7. Recent research suggests Rachlew was the second woman ever to land on the mainland of Antarctica, and the third to step onto the continent including islands. The four women had "travelled nearer to the South Pole than any woman had done before," Christensen was reported to have said when he arrived in London from South Africa on his way back.

=== 1933 Expedition ===
Rachlew seems to have been an energetic and lively presence on the 1933 expedition. Equipped with a cine-camera and a rifle, she took photographs, hunted seals and kept a diary of which only fragments remain.

We crept and slipped along, closer and closer in... It was all very exciting! But we had to give up when we were within 5 nautical miles of land...Great blocks of ice as big as church towers lay higgledy-piggledy, 5 miles deep, jammed tightly together, with only a few lanes intersecting them. It was impossible to get through. Not even a dog could scramble over those steep blocks.

Her diary is now lost and the extracts quoted in Lars Christensen's book, Such is the Antarctic, are "the only remaining words from the women who went to Antarctica before World War II".

At one time during the morning it became a little calmer and I made my way along to the verandah — as we called the built-in deck beneath the captain’s bridge — with my cine camera under my arm, to see if I could get any snaps of what could be seen of the after-deck between the waves. Suddenly the ship lurched violently and I fell and rolled in snow slush right across the verandah, coming to anchor with a crash on the port side, in the midst of some chairs and tables that were lashed securely there. Once there, I made use of the opportunity to take some snaps, and I very much hope they will be good — I’m sure I deserve it after all I went through.

In English, these words come via the translator, Edith Mary Garland Jayne (1874-1945), an "accomplished linguist", and daughter of Emily and Francis Jayne.

The Times reported that after the 1933 voyage Rachlew planned to go back to South Africa, where the travellers were assembling for the "11-days trip to Enderby Land". She would then go on a "short big-game hunting trip" with the Christensens and Mr. H. Bogen. Hans S.I. Bogen was author of Main events in the history of Antarctic exploration and several books in Norwegian about whaling, the history of Sandefjord and Lars Christensen. In early 1934 some of Rachlew's photographs were published in a French magazine by a journalist with a special interest in polar exploration.

=== 1936-1937 Expedition, 1937 landing ===
Rachel was part of the Lars Christiansen Expedition (1936-1937) to Antarctica. In 1937, conditions allowed Rachlew and others to land on Antarctica. Caroline Mikkelsen had been the first woman to do this: probably on the Tryne Islands in 1935. Then on 30 January 1937, Ingrid Christensen set foot on the mainland at Scullin Monolith, and records suggest that Rachlew was the next of the "four ladies" to do so.She was also the second woman to go up in a seaplane to view previously unknown Antarctic territory, where Ingrid Christensen had earlier dropped a Norwegian flag.

== Later life ==
Rachlew's husband was arrested in 1943 by the Quisling regime and was sent to the Grini detention camp.

Rachlew died on 14 May 1983 and was buried alongside her husband at Ris graveyard, Oslo.

== See also ==
- Ingrid Christensen = first woman to view Antarctica
- Caroline Mikkelsen - first woman to set foot on Antarctica (1935)
