= Taynaya Bay =

Bay in Antarctica

Taynaya Bay (68°27′S 78°16′E) is a bay which is completely enclosed except for a very narrow entrance on the north side, lying within the northern part of Langnes Peninsula, Vestfold Hills. The feature was photographed by the Lars Christensen Expedition (1936–37), but was plotted on the subsequent maps as a lake. John Roscoe's 1952 study of air photographs taken by Operation Highjump (1946–47) showed that the bay is connected at the north to the sea. It was photographed by ANARE (Australian National Antarctic Research Expeditions) (1954–58) and the Soviet Antarctic Expedition (1956), the latter applying the name Bukhta Taynaya (secret bay).
