= Málaga Committee of Public Safety =

Málaga Public Health Committee Comité de Salud Pública de Málaga
- Autonomous entity of Spain
- 1936–1937
- Map of Spain with the Province of Málaga highlighted 36°43′N 4°25′W
- Capital: Málaga
- Demonym: Spanish: Malagueño, Malacitano
- Historical era: Spanish Civil War
  - Established: 22 July 1936
  - Disestablished: 8 February 1937
| Preceded by | Succeeded by |
| Second Spanish Republic | Spanish State |
- Today part of: Spain ∟Málaga

The Málaga Public Health Committee (Spanish: Comité de Salud Pública de Málaga) was a revolutionary organization that emerged after the coup d'état that gave way to the Spanish Civil War, between the Nationalists and the Republicans. This entity was in charge of managing all political and social affairs until the city fell to the nationalist forces.

== History ==
After the coup d'état on 19 July in Málaga, unions and workers' parties prevailed. Initially, a CNT-UGT defense committee was established, but within a few days an agreement was reached with the left-wing parties to create the Public Health Committee. All organizations were represented on the committee: CNT, UGT, IR, JSU, PCE, PSOE, FIJL and the FAI. Although, due to its implementation, it was mainly the CNT that directed it.

During the period of time that it was active, the committee managed the militias, created a popular court to judge military crimes, and created Control Patrols, among other actions. Its management was severely limited by the isolation that the central government subjected it to and the poor coordination that took place between the neighboring committees.

In February 1937, Málaga was conquered by Franco's troops, and the committee disappeared.
