= November 1936 =

Month of 1936

<<	November 1936					>>
Su	Mo	Tu	We	Th	Fr	Sa
1	2	3	4	5	6	7
8	9	10	11	12	13	14
15	16	17	18	19	20	21
22	23	24	25	26	27	28
29	30

The following events occurred in November 1936:

== November 1, 1936 (Sunday) ==
- During a speech in Milan, Benito Mussolini referred to the existence of a "German-Italian axis."

== November 2, 1936 (Monday) ==
- BBC Television Service, Britain's first television station, was launched.
- The Canadian Broadcasting Corporation was launched.
- Nationalists captured Brunete.
- Born: Rose Bird, Chief Justice of California, near Tucson, Arizona (d. 1999)

== November 3, 1936 (Tuesday) ==
- Franklin D. Roosevelt was re-elected in the United States presidential election by a landslide. Roosevelt carried 46 out of 48 states in the most lopsided election in American history in terms of electoral votes.
- The Miyagi earthquake struck Japan.
- Several cantons in Switzerland banned the Communist Party.
- Austrian Chancellor Kurt Schuschnigg performed a cabinet reshuffle that ousted all three former members of the Heimwehr.
- Edward VIII opened Parliament with a speech from the throne.
- The first episode of Starlight was broadcast on BBC Television.
- Born: Roy Emerson, tennis player, in Blackbutt, Queensland, Australia

== November 4, 1936 (Wednesday) ==
- The CNT/FAI accepted four cabinet posts in the Spanish Republic, the first and only time that anarchists have participated in a national government.
- Nationalists captured Getafe.
- A defamation case opened in the High Court of Justice brought by Richard S. Lambert against Lt. Col. Cecil Levita. Lambert sued Levita after the Lieutenant Colonel suggested that Lambert was unfit to be associated with the British Film Institute because he believed in Gef the talking mongoose. Levita denied uttering the words attributed to him, but said they would have been fully justified if he did.
- The satirical anti-Nazi play Round Heads and Pointed Heads by Bertolt Brecht premiered at the Riddersalen Theatre in Copenhagen.
- Born:
  - C. K. Williams, poet, in Newark, New Jersey (d. 2016)
  - Didier Ratsiraka, then President of Madagascar, Vatomandry, Atsinanana Region (d. 2021)
- Died: Edgar André, 42, German communist politician (executed)

== November 5, 1936 (Thursday) ==
- Nazi Germany published a new penal code introducing heavy penalties for slandering Adolf Hitler or the memories of the late Paul von Hindenburg, Horst Wessel and Albert Leo Schlageter. The new code also removed duelling from the list of offenses.
- Born:
  - Uwe Seeler, footballer, in Hamburg, Germany (d. 2022)
  - Billy Sherrill, record producer, songwriter and arranger, in Phil Campbell, Alabama (d. 2015)
  - Michael Dertouzos, Electrical Engineering and Computer Science professor (d. 2001)

== November 6, 1936 (Friday) ==
- Spanish Prime Minister Francisco Largo Caballero and other government officials fled Madrid and set up a new capital in Valencia. Administration of Madrid was turned over to an eight-man junta led by General José Miaja.
- Franco ordered a halt to the executions of Basque priests who were considered supporters of the Republic.
- Richard S. Lambert won his defamation case and was awarded £7,500 by the jury.
- The British biographical film Rembrandt premiered in the United Kingdom.
- Symphony No. 3 in A minor, Op. 44 by Sergei Rachmaninoff was premiered by Leopold Stokowski conducting the Philadelphia Orchestra.

== November 7, 1936 (Saturday) ==
- The Madrid Defense Council was formed.
- Father Charles Coughlin announced that he was withdrawing from "all radio activity in the best interest of all the people" and retiring from politics. This retirement proved to be short-lived as he returned to the air in January 1937.
- Died: Charles "Chic" Sale, 51, American actor and vaudevillian

== November 8, 1936 (Sunday) ==
- Nationalist general Emilio Mola launched an assault on the Spanish capital city of Madrid, beginning the three-year Siege of Madrid.
- 250,000 people gathered in Hyde Park in support of the Jarrow Marchers.
- Guatemala and El Salvador recognized Francoist Spain.
- Born: Virna Lisi, actress, in Ancona, Italy (d. 2014)

== November 9, 1936 (Monday) ==
- Kostaq Kota became Prime Minister of Albania for the second time.
- Four masked men stole the Wallace Sword from the Wallace Monument in Scotland.
- John Barrymore and Elaine Barrie were wed in Yuma, Arizona a few minutes after midnight.
- The U.S. Supreme Court decided Bourdieu v. Pacific Western Oil Co. and Valentine v. United States.
- Born: Teddy Infuhr, child actor, in Missouri, United States (d. 2007)

== November 10, 1936 (Tuesday) ==
- The non-intervention committee concluded it had no evidence of foreign intervention in Spain.
- British MP John McGovern asked Chancellor of the Exchequer Neville Chamberlain if he considered it wise to proceed with the expenditure of Edward VIII's coronation "in view of the gambling that is going on at Lloyd's as to whether or not this Coronation will ever take place". Chamberlain ignored the question.

== November 11, 1936 (Wednesday) ==
- The Peel Commission arrived in Palestine to investigate the causes of the recent Arab unrest and recommend solutions.
- Joseph Goebbels banned art criticism in Germany and declared that only "art reporting" would be allowed from now on.
- President Roosevelt sent birthday greetings to Victor Emmanuel III of Italy, but only addressed him as the "king of Italy" and avoided his new additional title of "emperor of Ethiopia".

== November 12, 1936 (Thursday) ==
- Winston Churchill gave a speech in Parliament attacking the Baldwin government for its slow response to the "unwelcome fact" of German rearmament, warning that Britain was entering a new period of danger. "The era of procrastination, of half measures, of soothing and baffling expedients, of delays, is coming to a close", Churchill stated. "In its place, we are entering a period of consequences."
- The San Francisco–Oakland Bay Bridge opened.
- The comedy play Housemaster by Ian Hay premiered at the Apollo Theatre in London.

== November 13, 1936 (Friday) ==
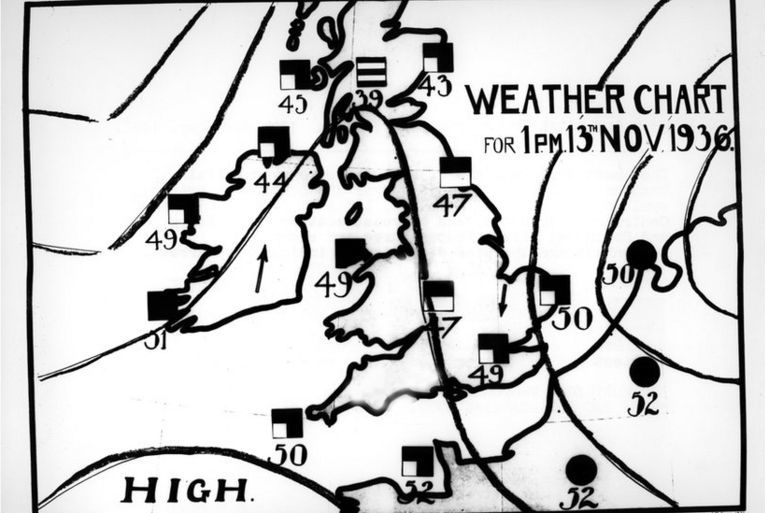
BBC television weather chart for 13 November 1936 - the BBC made the first televised weather forecasts in this month

- A 20-minute fistfight broke out in the French Chamber of Deputies over accusations made by right-wing newspapers that Interior Minister Roger Salengro was a deserter during the war.
- Belgium asked the League of Nations to lay down specifics on what help a member nation could count on receiving in the event of being attacked.
- The comedy film Go West, Young Man starring Mae West was released.

== November 14, 1936 (Saturday) ==
- Germany announced that it would no longer observe the articles in the Treaty of Versailles that had internationalized rivers such as the Rhine, Elbe and Oder so that landlocked countries could have access to the sea.
- Buenaventura Durruti arrived in Madrid with members of his anarchist brigade, the Durruti Column.
- The British government created the Suez Canal Zone under its control.

== November 15, 1936 (Sunday) ==
- The Battle of Ciudad Universitaria began.
- The Condor Legion began active participation in the Spanish Civil War.
- Born: Wolf Biermann, singer-songwriter, in Hamburg, Germany

== November 16, 1936 (Monday) ==
- Edward VIII summoned Prime Minister Stanley Baldwin and told him he wanted to marry Wallis Simpson. Baldwin said the British public would not accept Simpson as Queen.
- Nationalist forces crossed the Manzanares.
- 40 were killed in an explosion at a gunpowder factory near Marseille.

== November 17, 1936 (Tuesday) ==
- In British Parliament, Labour MP William Adamson asked President of the Board of Trade Walter Runciman if there was "any special scrutiny of books and printed literature imported from other countries." Runciman, pretending to be unaware that this was in reference to the censorship of foreign newspapers and magazines reporting on the king's relationship with Wallis Simpson, asked Adamson to provide particulars to his office in order to get an answer. Ellen Wilkinson, also of Labour, then asked Runciman "why, in the case of two American magazines of high repute imported into this country during the last few weeks, at least two and sometimes three pages have been torn out; and what is this thing the British public are not allowed to see?" "My department has nothing to do with that", Runciman answered.
- Died: John Bowers, 50, American film actor (suicide)

== November 18, 1936 (Wednesday) ==
- Italy and Germany recognized Francoist Spain.
- Franco declared a blockade of Barcelona.
- Edward VIII visited Dowlais in South Wales where he saw the abandoned site of the Dowlais Ironworks. The King was shocked by the poverty he witnessed and famously declared that "something must be done."
- Died: Roger Salengro, 46, French politician (suicide)

== November 19, 1936 (Thursday) ==
- British War Secretary Duff Cooper warned that Britain would have to resort to conscription if military recruitment numbers did not increase.
- Born: Dick Cavett, television talk show host, in Gibbon, Nebraska

== November 20, 1936 (Friday) ==
- 362 were killed in northern Akita, Japan when a dike collapsed after heavy rains.
- In the Spanish Civil War, the Germans launched Operation Ursula.
- German submarine U-18 sank in a collision during a training exercise with the loss of 8 out of 20 crew. It would be raised eight days later and returned to service in September 1937.
- The screwball comedy Love on the Run starring Joan Crawford and Clark Gable was released.
- Born: Don DeLillo, author, in New York City
- Died: Buenaventura Durruti, 40, Spanish anarchist (killed in Spanish Civil War); José Antonio Primo de Rivera, 33, Spanish Falangist leader (executed by firing squad)

== November 21, 1936 (Saturday) ==
- Eoin O'Duffy and volunteers of the Irish Brigade sailed from Dublin en route to Spain to fight for the Nationalists.

== November 22, 1936 (Sunday) ==
- Submarines attacked the Spanish Republican fleet at Cartagena. The Spanish Republic issued a statement expressing its belief that the submarines were "part of a foreign fleet, since the rebels have never possessed such instruments."
- Died: Ernest R. Graham, 68, American architect

== November 23, 1936 (Monday) ==
- The Battle of Ciudad Universitaria ended in a strategic Republican victory.
- The U.S. State Department announced that the Spanish embassy in Madrid was closing and the staff would be moved to Valencia.
- Robert Johnson entered a studio in San Antonio, Texas and recorded for the first time. The first song he recorded was "Terraplane Blues".
- This is the cover date of the first issue of the revamped Life magazine, transformed by its new ownership from a general interest publication to a news magazine with heavy emphasis on photojournalism.
- Born: Robert Barnard, crime writer, critic and lecturer, in Essex, England (d. 2013); Steve Landesberg, actor and comedian, in New York City (d. 2010)

== November 24, 1936 (Tuesday) ==
- Nazi Germany attacked the Nobel Prize committee for its decision to award the Peace Prize to Carl von Ossietzky. "Bestowing the Nobel Prize on a notorious traitor is an impudent challenge and insult to the new Germany", the statement read.
- Following the German and Italian recognition of Francoist Spain, the Republic seized their embassies in Madrid.
- A train accident on the Chicago "L" killed 10 people.

== November 25, 1936 (Wednesday) ==
- Japan and Nazi Germany signed the Anti-Comintern Pact.
- Edward VIII met with Stanley Baldwin again and said he wanted a morganatic marriage that would allow him to remain King while Wallis Simpson would be designated his consort instead of Queen. This arrangement would require new legislation and though Baldwin said this would not be acceptable, he would take the matter up with the Cabinet.
- The drama film Lloyd's of London had its world premiere at the Astor Theatre in New York City.
- Died: Andrew Harper, 92, Scottish-American biblical scholar

== November 26, 1936 (Thursday) ==
- Albania recognized Francoist Spain.
- The Daily Mirror became the first British newspaper to put Wallis Simpson on its front page. The story, which only identified her as "a former United States society woman now living in London", was about the death threats she was receiving and the precautions detectives were taking of opening all packages she received.

== November 27, 1936 (Friday) ==
- The Spanish Republic invoked Article XI of the Covenant of the League of Nations in which any member of the League affected by war or threat of war could request a meeting of the council.
- The British Cabinet rejected Edward's proposal for a morganatic marriage.
- President Roosevelt visited Rio de Janeiro. He made a speech in the Brazilian Chamber of Deputies in which he called on all republics of the Americas to work together so "conflict will be banished from this part of the world."
- Born: Dahlia Ravikovitch, poet, in Ramat Gan, Mandatory Palestine (d. 2005)

== November 28, 1936 (Saturday) ==
- Franco signed a secret treaty of mutual friendship and assistance with Italy.
- 29 were killed and 69 wounded in the unsuccessful revolt of a regiment in the Ecuadorian Army.
- Japan recognized Ethiopia as Italian territory.
- This week's issue of The New Yorker included a profile of Time Inc. co-founder Henry Luce. The article by Wolcott Gibbs was completely written in a parody of Time magazine's idiosyncratic style and included the famous phrase, "Backward ran sentences until reeled the mind." Luce was not amused by the parody and Time Inc. would feud with The New Yorker for years afterward.
- Navy defeated Army 7-0 in the Army–Navy Game before 102,000 people at Philadelphia Municipal Stadium.
- Born: Gary Hart, diplomat and politician, in Ottawa, Kansas

== November 29, 1936 (Sunday) ==
- The Imperial Japanese Navy seaplane tender Chitose was launched.
- The Soviet Union claimed to have the largest air force in the world with 7,000 planes.
- The First Battle of the Corunna Road began.

== November 30, 1936 (Monday) ==
- The Republicans launched the Villarreal Offensive.
- The Crystal Palace of London was destroyed by fire. Huge numbers of people turned out to watch the spectacular blaze.
- President Roosevelt visited Buenos Aires to an enthusiastic welcome.
- Born: Knud Enemark Jensen, Danish Olympic cyclist; in Aarhus, Central Denmark Region, Denmark (d. 1960, heatstroke and fractured skull during Olympic road race)
