= December 1936 =

Month of 1936

<<	December 1936					>>
Su	Mo	Tu	We	Th	Fr	Sa
		1	2	3	4	5
6	7	8	9	10	11	12
13	14	15	16	17	18	19
20	21	22	23	24	25	26
27	28	29	30	31

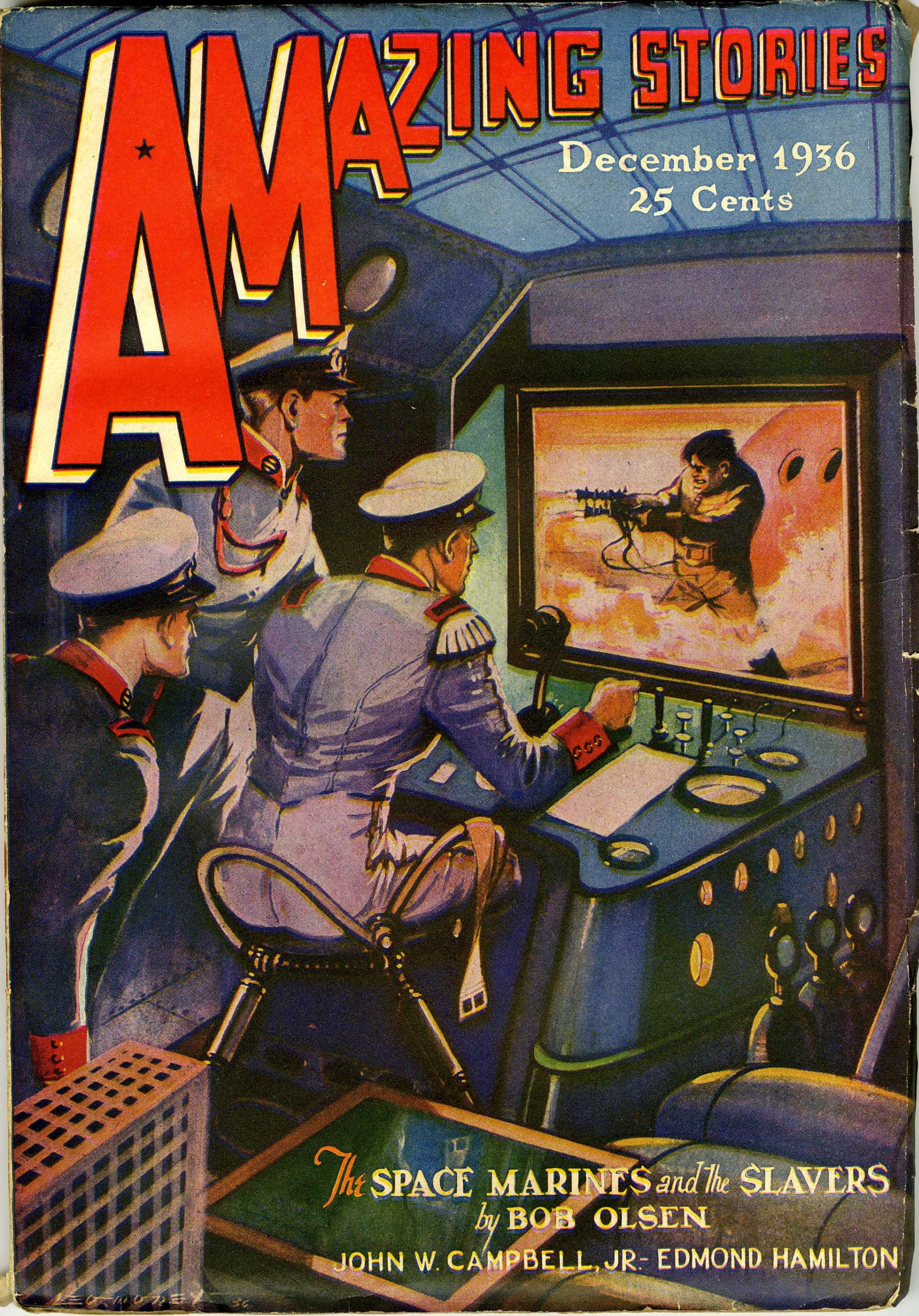
Cover of the pulp magazine Amazing Stories (December 1936).

The following events occurred in December 1936:

== December 1, 1936 (Tuesday) ==
- The Edward VIII abdication crisis finally came out into the open in Britain when the Bishop of Bradford Alfred Blunt, speaking at his diocesan conference about the upcoming royal coronation, said of the king that "Some of us wish that he gave more positive signs of his awareness." The Yorkshire Post used the speech to question the king's behaviour and the rest of the British press soon followed suit, finally breaking their policy of self-imposed censorship.
- 5,000 Germans landed at Cádiz to fight for Franco.
- Nazi Germany passed several new laws. Membership in the Hitler Youth was made mandatory and the death penalty was introduced for those who hoarded their wealth abroad.
- The Inter-American Conference for the Maintenance of Peace opened in Buenos Aires, Argentina. U.S. President Franklin D. Roosevelt opened the conference with an address that included The More Abundant Life phrase.

== December 2, 1936 (Wednesday) ==
- British Prime Minister Stanley Baldwin informed the King that a morganatic marriage would not be accepted. Edward now had three choices: end his relationship with Wallis Simpson, marry against the advice of his ministers who would then resign, or abdicate.
- Born: Tsutomu Yamazaki, Japanese actor, in Matsudo, Chiba, Japan
- Died: Rosario Garibaldi Bosco, 70, Italian politician and writer; John Ringling, 70, American co-founder of Ringling Brothers Circus

== December 3, 1936 (Thursday) ==
- The First Battle of the Corunna Road ended indecisively.
- President Roosevelt visited Montevideo.
- Wallis Simpson left England and boarded a boat for France. Over the next two days Simpson and her entourage drove to Cannes, doing their best to dodge reporters along the way.
- Born: Clay Dalrymple, baseball player, in Chico, California

== December 4, 1936 (Friday) ==
- The British cabinet held a special session to discuss the abdication crisis.
- Born: Freddy Cannon, rock and roll singer, in Revere, Massachusetts

== December 5, 1936 (Saturday) ==
- The 1936 Soviet Constitution, also known as the Stalin constitution, was adopted in the Soviet Union.
- The Sarnia Imperials beat the Ottawa Rough Riders 26–20 in the 24th Grey Cup of Canadian football.
- Born: James Lee Burke, mystery author, in Texas

== December 6, 1936 (Sunday) ==
- Mexico announced that it had given permission for Leon Trotsky to enter the country and "remain as long as he desires."
- Born: Kenneth Copeland, televangelist, in Lubbock, Texas

== December 7, 1936 (Monday) ==
- Streptococcous meningitis was successfully treated for the first time with a sulfa drug. The condition was previously 99% fatal.
- Australian cricketer Jack Fingleton became the first player to score centuries in four consecutive Test innings.
- Died: Vasyl Stefanyk, 65, Austro-Hungarian Ukrainian writer and politician

== December 8, 1936 (Tuesday) ==
- The German battleship Gneisenau was launched.
- German media acknowledged the British abdication crisis for the first time when Hans Fritzsche gave an address over the radio explaining that the German press had taken a stance "nobler" than that of foreign newspapers by not reporting on "the private affairs of those concerned."
- Nazi Germany imposed a travel ban on Carl von Ossietzky so he could not go to Oslo to accept his Nobel Peace Prize.
- General elections were held in Nicaragua. An alliance of the Liberal Nationalist Party and Conservative Nationalist Party claimed 99.83% of the vote.
- Born: David Carradine, actor and martial artist, in Hollywood, California (d. 2009)

== December 9, 1936 (Wednesday) ==
- The British Cabinet pleaded with King Edward to reconsider his decision to abdicate.
- 1936 KLM Croydon accident: A KLM Royal Dutch Airlines passenger plane crashed in Croydon soon after takeoff in heavy fog, killing 15 of 17 aboard. The accident was attributed to pilot error. Autogyro inventor Juan de la Cierva was among the dead.
- David Frankfurter went on trial in Chur, Switzerland for the murder of Nazi leader Wilhelm Gustloff.
- Died: Juan de la Cierva, 41, Spanish civil engineer, pilot and aeronautical engineer (plane crash); Arvid Lindman, 74, Swedish admiral and two-time prime minister of Sweden; Lottie Pickford, 43, Canadian film actress and socialite (heart attack)

== December 10, 1936 (Thursday) ==
- Edward VIII signed the Instrument of Abdication. As recited in the House of Commons that day, it read: "I, Edward VIII, of Great Britain, Ireland, and the British Dominions beyond the Seas, King, Emperor of India, do hereby declare My irrevocable determination to renounce the Throne for Myself and for My descendants, and My desire that effect should be given to this Instrument of Abdication immediately. In token whereof I have hereunto set My hand this tenth day of December, nineteen hundred and thirty-six, in the presence of the witnesses whose signatures are subscribed."
- The 1936 Nobel Prizes were awarded in Stockholm. The recipients were Victor F. Hess of Austria and Carl David Anderson of the United States for Physics, Peter Debye of the Netherlands (Chemistry), Henry Hallett Dale of the United Kingdom and Otto Loewi of Austria (Physiologiy or Medicine) and Eugene O'Neill of the United States (Literature). In Oslo the Peace Prize was awarded to Carlos Saavedra Lamas of Argentina for his work ending the Chaco War. Carl von Ossietzky was retroactively awarded the Peace Prize for 1935, but he did not attend. The Norwegian royal family was conspicuously absent from the ceremony as well, probably at the request of the Government which feared German reprisals.
- Died: Bobby Abel, 79, English cricketer; Luigi Pirandello, 69, Italian dramatist and author

== December 11, 1936 (Friday) ==
- His Majesty's Declaration of Abdication Act received Royal Assent at 1:52 a.m., ending King Edward VIII's reign. Edward's younger brother Albert, Duke of York succeeded to the throne as King George VI.
- Edward gave his abdication speech by radio to a worldwide audience. "I have for 25 years tried to serve", he said. "But you must believe me when I tell you that I have found it impossible to carry the heavy burden of responsibility and to discharge my duties as King as I would wish to do without the help and support of the woman I love."
- Amendment Number 27 of the Constitution of the Irish Free State was passed to eliminate the role of the King.

== December 12, 1936 (Saturday) ==
- The Xi'an Incident began in China when Generalissimo Chiang Kai-shek was arrested by Marshal Zhang Xueliang.
- Edward left the United Kingdom for Austria. King George VI announced he would create his brother Duke of Windsor.
- The 1937 NFL draft was held. Sam Francis was selected first overall by the Philadelphia Eagles.
- The romantic drama film Camille starring Greta Garbo and Robert Taylor was released.
- Born: Iolanda Balaș, Olympic high jumping champion, in Timișoara, Romania (d. 2016)

== December 13, 1936 (Sunday) ==
- The Nationalists launched the Aceituna Campaign.
- The Second Battle of the Corunna Road began.
- The Archbishop of Canterbury made controversial remarks about Edward's abdication during a radio address when he called it "sad" that the ex-king "should have sought his happiness in a manner inconsistent with the Christian principles of marriage and within a social circle whose standards and ways of life are alien to all the best instincts and traditions of his people." The speech was widely condemned for showing a lack of kindness toward the former king and attacking his friends.
- The Green Bay Packers beat the Boston Redskins 21–6 in the NFL Championship Game at the Polo Grounds in New York City.
- Died: Russell Benjamin Harrison, 82, American businessman, lawyer, diplomat and politician

== December 14, 1936 (Monday) ==
- David Frankfurter was sentenced to 18 years in prison for the murder of Wilhelm Gustloff.
- The Nationalist Canarias sank the Soviet cargo vessel Komsomol as it left Valencia.
- Carl von Ossietzky was admitted to the Nordend Hospital in Berlin, where he would stay until his death in 1938.

== December 15, 1936 (Tuesday) ==
- The Irish Brigade arrived in Algeciras.
- The German press was banned from running pictures of either Wallis Simpson or the former king Edward.
- Born: Donald Goines, novelist, in Detroit (d. 1974)

== December 16, 1936 (Wednesday) ==
- Through mediation by the International Red Cross, both sides in the Spanish Civil War agreed to exchange prisoners. A total of 4,000 men would be exchanged.
- Larry Kelley of Yale University was awarded the Heisman Trophy.

== December 17, 1936 (Thursday) ==
- Italian reports from Ethiopia indicated that Imru Haile Selassie, cousin of Haile Selassie and the last of the major chieftains resisting the Italian occupation, had been captured.
- Giuseppe Motta was elected President of the Swiss Confederation for 1937.
- Born: Pope Francis (born Jorge Mario Bergoglio), 266th Pope of the Catholic Church, in Buenos Aires, Argentina (d. 2025)
- Died: Ben Lilly, 80, American big game hunter and mountain man

== December 18, 1936 (Friday) ==
- Anthony Eden disclosed to the House of Commons that 5,000 gas masks had been sold to the Spanish Republic. The government hastened to add that the gas masks were equally available to Franco's forces at the same prices because they were classified as "medical supplies" and not munitions.
- The Public Order Act received Royal Assent.

== December 19, 1936 (Saturday) ==
- San Vicente, El Salvador was razed by a devastating earthquake.

== December 20, 1936 (Sunday) ==
- In Cannes, Wallis Simpson spoke to the media for the first time since her divorce, although she took no questions. She mostly talked about the weather and the beauty of the French Riviera. Herman Rogers, who was hosting Mrs. Simpson at the villa where the reception took place, said she would be staying there for several months.
- Died: Elsa Einstein, 60, second wife of Albert Einstein

== December 21, 1936 (Monday) ==
- Cuban President Miguel Mariano Gómez vetoed a bill that would have introduced an army-sponsored 9-cent tax on each bag of sugar to fund the construction of rural schools run by the military. Gómez explained in his veto message that it was "the duty of the educational and not the military institutions" to teach Cuban children. Opponents of Gómez immediately began impeachment proceedings against him, accusing the president of trying to unconstitutionally force congress to defeat the tax bill as well as embezzling public funds.
- The Junkers Ju 88 had its first flight.
- The U.S. Supreme Court decided United States v. Curtiss-Wright Export Corp..

== December 22, 1936 (Tuesday) ==
- Egyptian parliament ratified the Anglo-Egyptian treaty.

== December 23, 1936 (Wednesday) ==
- The first troops of the Corpo Truppe Volontarie arrived in Cádiz to aid the Nationalists.
- The Inter-American Conference for the Maintenance of Peace ended.
- The dramatic play The Wingless Victory by Maxwell Anderson premiered at the Empire Theatre on Broadway.
- Born: James Stacy, actor, in Los Angeles, California (d. 2016)

== December 24, 1936 (Thursday) ==
- The Villarreal Offensive ended in Republican failure.
- Miguel Mariano Gómez was impeached as President of Cuba by a senatorial vote of 22 to 12. Federico Laredo Brú became the new president, but army commander-in-chief Fulgencio Batista was acknowledged to be the country's real de facto ruler.
- Pope Pius XI delivered his annual Christmas message from his sickbed. The pope called the Spanish Civil War "a new menace more threatening than ever before for the whole world and principally for Europe and Christian civilization."
- A Spanish coast guard cutter seized the German merchant ship Palos on suspicion of carrying contraband material.
- Died: Irene Fenwick, 49, American actress

== December 25, 1936 (Friday) ==
- The Xi'an Incident ended when Chiang Kai-shek was released.
- The mystery-comedy film After the Thin Man, a sequel to The Thin Man, was released.
- Born: Princess Alexandra, The Honourable Lady Ogilvy, in London

== December 26, 1936 (Saturday) ==
- In New York, the first contingent of the Abraham Lincoln Brigade secretly departed aboard the Normandie to fight for the Republicans in Spain.
- George Orwell arrived in Barcelona with the intention of writing journalistic reports for the foreign press, but what he saw inspired him to join a leftist militia to fight against fascism. Orwell later collected his experiences into the book Homage to Catalonia.
- The musical film Gold Diggers of 1937 directed by Lloyd Bacon and Busby Berkeley was released.
- The comedic play The Women by Clare Boothe Luce premiered at the Ethel Barrymore Theatre on Broadway.

== December 27, 1936 (Sunday) ==
- The Battle of Lopera began.
- United Airlines Trip 34: A United Air Lines Boeing 247 crashed into a hill south of Newhall, California during rainy weather, killing all 12 aboard.
- The Spanish government decided to hold the Palos despite a German threat of reprisals.
- Mahatma Gandhi emerged from two years of silence to make a political speech. He cryptically said, "Show me the way and I am prepared to return to jail. I am prepared to be hanged. If you do all I want you to do, the Viceroy will say: 'I am wrong – I thought you people were terrorists, and if you like we Britishers will return by the next steamer.' We would then say to Lord Linlithgow and the British: 'India is big enough to hold you and more like you.' That is my Swaraj." Gandhi denied that his speech indicated that he was returning to public life.
- Died: Hans von Seeckt, 70, German general
- Died: Mehmet Akif Ersoy, Turkish-Albanian poet, (b. 1873)

== December 28, 1936 (Monday) ==
- In response to the Palos incident, Germany dispatched a fleet of torpedo boats to protect German shipping in the Bay of Biscay region.
- Died: Nestor Lakoba, Abkhaz communist leader, poisoned

== December 29, 1936 (Tuesday) ==
- The Battle of Lopera ended in Nationalist victory.
- The first coast-to-coast broadcast by the Mutual Broadcasting System, America's third national radio network, occurs.
- Spain released the Palos but held part of the cargo.
- Born: Mary Tyler Moore, actress, in Brooklyn, New York (d. 2017)
- Died: Lucy, Lady Houston, 79, British philanthropist
- Died International Brigader Tommy Wood, age 17, died following wounds sustained at the Battle of Lopera.

== December 30, 1936 (Wednesday) ==
- The Flint sit-down strike began in Michigan.

== December 31, 1936 (Thursday) ==
- The Aceituna Campaign ended in Nationalist victory.
- Lebanon established the National Order of the Cedar.
- Born: Sharon Mae Disney, actress, in Los Angeles, California (d. 1993)
- Died: Doc Casey, 66, American baseball player and manager; Miguel de Unamuno, 72, Spanish writer
