= Barrier Island (Antarctica) =

Island at the entrance of Tryne Fjord in Tryne Sound

Barrier Island (68°26′S 78°23′E) is an island, 0.5 nautical miles (0.9 km) long, at the north end of the Vestfold Hills, lying just north of the entrance to Tryne Fjord in Tryne Sound. Mapped by Norwegian cartographers from air photos taken by the Lars Christensen Expedition, 1936–37. Visited in 1957 by an ANARE (Australian National Antarctic Research Expeditions) party and so named because the island appeared to form a barrier to the passage of icebergs up Tryne Fjord.

== See also ==
- List of antarctic and sub-antarctic islands
