= Ingrid Christensen =

Norwegian polar explorer

- Shown during her 1931 expedition
- Born: Ingrid Dahl; 10 October 1891
- Died: 18 June 1976 (aged 84)
- Known for: First woman in Antarctica
- Spouse: Lars Christensen

Ingrid Christensen (10 October 1891 – 18 June 1976) was an early polar explorer. She was known as the first woman to view Antarctica and land on the Antarctic mainland.

== Early life ==
Christensen (née Dahl) was the daughter of Alfhild Freng Dahl and wholesaler and ship owner Thor Dahl, who was at the time one of the largest merchants in Sandefjord, Norway.

The Norwegian Antarctic historian Hans Bogen described her in 1955: “Ingrid Dahl was exactly what in our time we call a kjekk og frisk jente (a Norwegian expression meaning a girl who could be at once one of the boys, then one of the girls, without losing her femininity or charm). She was the natural leader of the girls in her age group because of her initiative, humour and fearlessness, qualities she has preserved unwaveringly to the present day”. Ingrid married Lars Christensen in 1910, uniting two of Sandefjord's most powerful ship owning families, and they had six children.

== Antarctic exploration ==
Christensen made four trips to the Antarctic with her husband on the ship Thorshavn in the 1930s, becoming the first woman to see Antarctica, the first to fly over it, and—arguably—the first woman to land on the Antarctic mainland.

In 1931, Christensen sailed with Mathilde Wegger. The expedition sighted and named Bjerkö Head on 5 February 1931, making Christensen and Wegger the first women to see Antarctica. Douglas Mawson reported spotting two women aboard a Norwegian ship, who were probably Christensen and Wegger, during his BANZARE expedition. He wired back to the Australian media: "...much astonishment was excited by the dramatic appearance on their decks of two women attired in the modes of civilisation. Theirs is a unique experience, for they can make much merit of the fact that they are, perhaps, the first of their sex to visit Antarctica".

In 1933, Christensen sailed with Lillemor (Ingebjørg) Rachlew, who kept a diary and took photographs, which appeared in Lars Christensen's book even though no landing was possible. Christensen sailed south for the third time in 1933–34 with Ingebjørg Dedichen. They again did not manage a landing, though circumnavigated almost the entire continent. In 1934/35 Danish-born Caroline Mikkelsen, wife of Captain Klarius Mikkelsen, sailed to Antarctica and landed on the Tryne Islands on the 20 February 1935 and was, until recently, thought to be the first woman to land on Antarctica. However, since Mikkelsen landed on an Antarctic island, Christensen is considered the first woman to set foot on the Antarctic mainland.

In 1936–37 Christensen made her fourth and final trip south, with daughter Augusta Sofie Christensen, Lillemor Rachlew, and Solveig Widerøe, the ‘four ladies’ for whom the underwater Four Ladies Bank was named during the voyage. Christensen flew over the mainland, becoming the first woman to see Antarctica from the air. On 30 January 1937, Lars Christensen's diary records that Ingrid Christensen landed at Scullin Monolith, becoming the first woman to set foot on the Antarctic mainland, followed by the other three of the 'four ladies'.

== Awards and honours ==
In 1998 and 2002, polar researchers investigated Caroline Mikkelsen's landing and concluded it was on the Tryne Islands, rather than the Antarctic mainland. Other research confirmed Christensen was the first to disembark on Scullin Monolith on 30 January 1937, making her the first woman to step on the Antarctic mainland.

=== Role in Christensen Antarctic explorations ===
Christensen played a major role in her husband's Antarctic expeditions. Archaeologist Waldemar Brøgger, wrote in the cover story of the inaugural issue of the Norwegian magazine Verden I Bilder (The World in Pictures): "In all the excursions, Lars and Ingrid Christensen have been united in the undertaking—in thick and thin, in storm and bad weather, in good weather and joys. It is almost unique in the history of exploration that two persons have thus thriven for the same goal, kept the distant target in sight and never given up before achieving it... Ingrid Christensen’s part in the whole enterprise is not the smaller, by reason of her incredibly bold, fearless personality, and it is symbolically right that it should be she who, from an aircraft threw down the Norwegian flag."

=== Order of St Olav ===
For her contribution to Norway's cause in America during the war and for her public efforts, Christensen received Norway's Knighthood, First Class, Order of St Olav, in 1946.

== Legacy ==
=== Name given to part of Antarctica ===
Ingrid Christensen Coast in East Antarctica was discovered and named by Klarius Mikkelsen in 1935.

=== In fiction ===
Christensen's four journeys to Antarctica were fictionalised in the 2013 novel Chasing the Light.
