= Tryne Fjord =

Fjord in Antarctica

Coordinates: 68°28′S 78°22′E

Location of Tryne Fjord
Antarctica

Tryne Fjord is an irregular-shaped fjord that idents the northern side of Langnes Peninsula in the Vestfold Hills, Antarctica. Mapped and named Tryne Fjord (snout fjord) by the Lars Christensen Expedition, 1936–37. Barrier Island lies at the entrance to the fjord.
