= Tryne Bay =

Bay in Antarctica

Tryne Bay (68°24′S 78°28′E) is a bay about 3 nautical miles (6 km) wide at the northeast end of the Vestfold Hills, lying between the Tryne Islands and the coast. Charted by Norwegian cartographers from air photos taken by the Lars Christensen Expedition (1936–37) and named "Trynevika" (the snout bay).
