= Nevado Tres Cruces Central =

Mountain in Chile

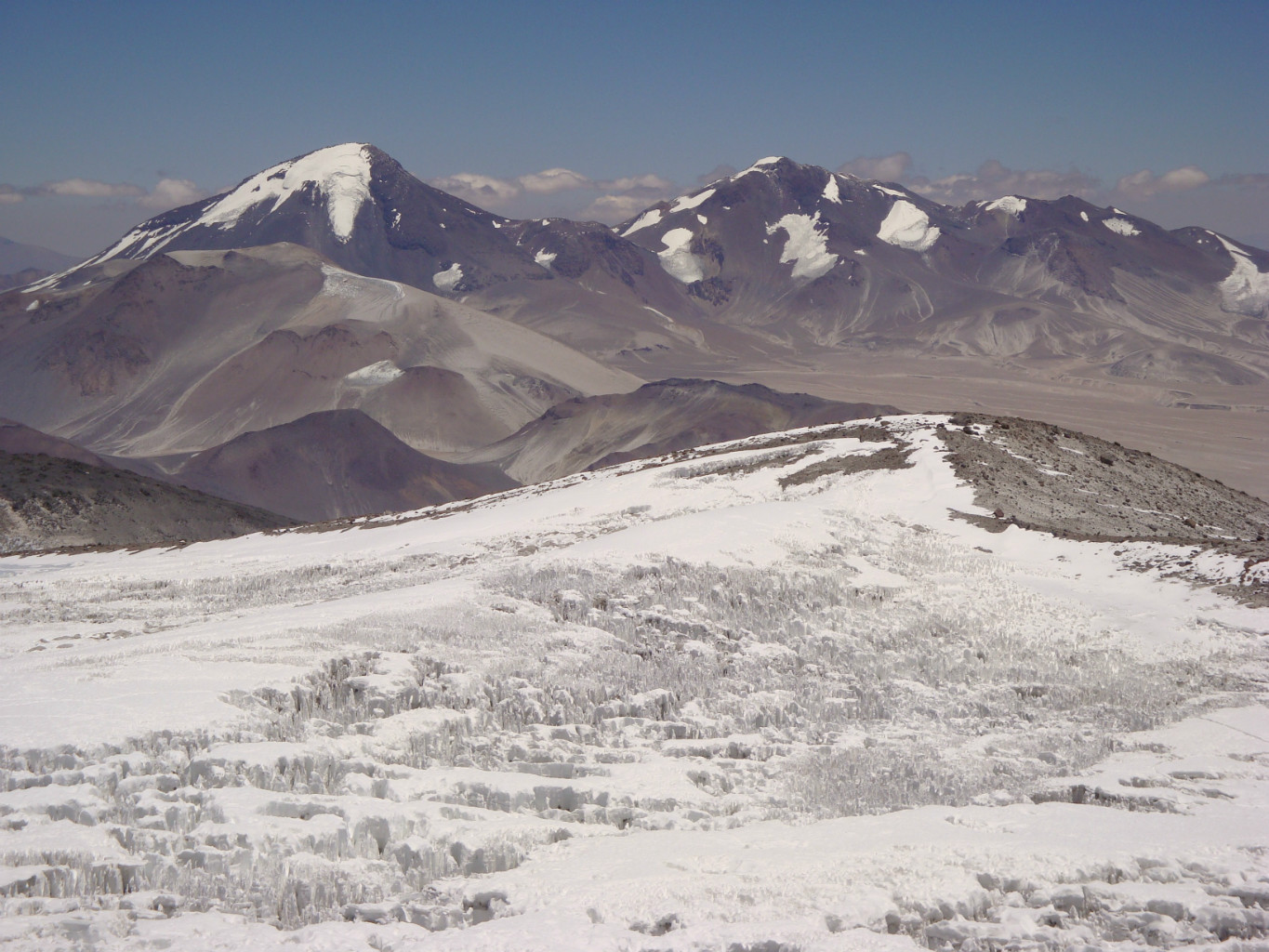
- Tres Cruces Massif from Ojos del Salado, looking west. Center, Nevado Tres Cruces Central. Left, Nevado Tres Cruces.

Highest point
- Elevation: 6,629 m (21,749 ft)
- Prominence: 610 m (2,000 ft)
- Coordinates: 27.069886°S 68.785724°W

Naming
- English translation: Central three crosses
- Language of name: Spanish

Geography
- Location within Chile
- Location: Region III Chile
- Parent range: Cordillera Claudio Gay

Geology
- Rock age: Pleistocene
- Mountain type: Volcano
- Volcanic zone: Central Volcanic Zone
- Last eruption: 28,000 years ago.

Climbing
- First ascent: Stefan Osiecki and Witold Paryski, 1937
- Easiest route: Walk

Nevado Tres Cruces Central is the second summit of an extinct volcanic massif, located in the Andes mountain range in the Atacama region of northern (Chile).

This summit, the second in altitude of the Tres Cruces massif, reaches 6629 meters above sea level, and a topographic prominence of nearly 610 meters in relation to the main or south summit. It is the highest summit located entirely in Chilean territory. Along with the south summit, it is the most visited of the massif; the col that connects them allows the ascent of both during the same expedition. That is the case of the first summiters, the Poles Stefan Osiecki and Witold Paryski, on 26 February 1937.

It has a crater of about one kilometer diameter.
