= Tryne Islands =

Islands of Antarctica

Coordinates: 68°22′26″S 78°24′57″E

Location in Antarctica

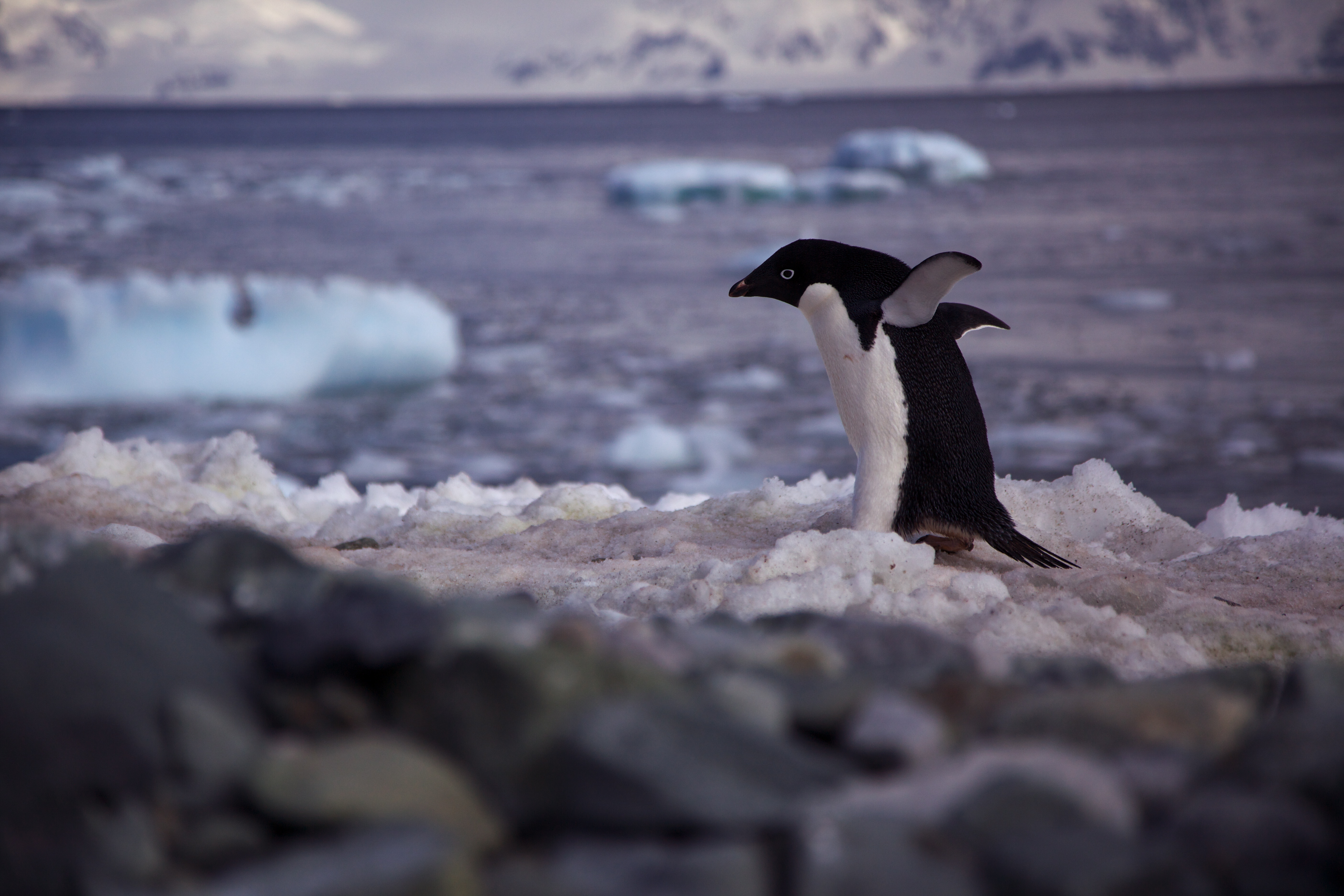
Adélie penguins breed in the IBA

The Tryne Islands are a group of numerous small Antarctic islands and rocks, about 7 km (4 mi) in extent, forming the western limit of Tryne Bay and Tryne Sound at the north-eastern end of the Vestfold Hills. The islands were mapped by Norwegian cartographers from aerial photographs taken by the Lars Christensen Expedition (1936–37) and named Trynøyane ("snout islands").

== Historic site ==
Mikkelsen Cairn: A rock cairn and a wooden mast were erected on 20 February 1935 by a landing party led by Captain Klarius Mikkelsen of the Norwegian whaling ship Thorshavn. A member of the party was Mikkelsen's wife Caroline, the first woman to set foot on East Antarctica. The cairn was discovered by Australian National Antarctic Research Expedition field parties in 1957, 1977 and again in 1995. The site has been designated a Historic Site or Monument (HSM 72), following a proposal by Australia and Norway to the Antarctic Treaty Consultative Meeting.

== Important Bird Area ==
A 40 ha site, comprising a small unnamed ice-free island in the north of the group, has been designated an Important Bird Area (IBA) by BirdLife International because it supports a breeding colony of about 13,000 pairs of Adélie penguins, estimated from 2011 satellite imagery.

== See also ==
- List of Antarctic and Subantarctic islands
