= Caroline Mikkelsen =

Danish-Norwegian explorer (1906–1998)

- Caroline Mikkelsen raising the flag of Norway at a cairn on the Antarctic Tryne Islands, 1935.
- Born: 20 November 1906; Denmark
- Died: 15 September 1998 (aged 91)
- Known for: First woman on an Antarctic island

Caroline Mikkelsen (21 November 1906 – 15 September 1998, later married Mandel) was a Danish-Norwegian explorer who on 20 February 1935 was the first woman to set foot on Antarctica, although whether this was on the mainland or an island is a matter of dispute.

== Antarctic exploration ==
Caroline Mikkelsen was born on 20 November 1906 in Denmark, later she married her first husband Norwegian Captain Klarius Mikkelsen and moved to Norway.

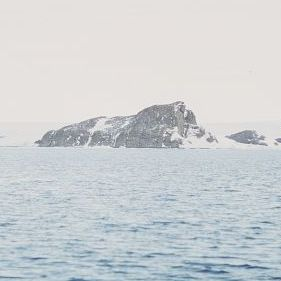
Mount Caroline Mikkelsen

In the winter of 1934–1935, Mikkelsen accompanied her Norwegian husband Klarius on an Antarctic expedition sponsored by Lars Christensen, on the resupply vessel M/S Thorshavn with instructions to look for Antarctic lands that could be annexed for Norway. Mount Caroline Mikkelsen is named for her.

On 20 February 1935, the expedition made landfall somewhere on the Antarctic continental shelf. Mikkelsen left the ship and participated in raising the Norwegian flag and in building a memorial cairn. Mikkelsen never made any recorded claims to have landed on the mainland, but was initially thought to have landed on the Vestfold Hills not far from the present Davis Station. She did not publicly speak about her Antarctic voyage until sixty years after her landing in 1995 when she spoke about her journey to the Norwegian newspaper Aftenposten having been contacted by Davis Station Leader Diana Patterson.

In 1941 her husband Klarius died and in 1944 she married Johan Mandel from Tønsberg. Mikkelsen-Mandel died in 1998.

In 1998 and 2002, Australian researchers published historical articles in the Polar Record concluding that the landing party from the Thorshavn—and thus Mikkelsen—landed on the Tryne Islands where a marker at Mikkelsen's Cairn can still be seen today. The landing site is an approximately five kilometres from the Antarctic mainland. No alternative mainland landing site for the Mikkelsen party has been discovered, in spite of years of searching by Davis Station workers.

Consequently, Mikkelsen is regarded as the first woman to set foot on Antarctica, and Ingrid Christensen as the first to stand on the Antarctic mainland.
