= Langnes Peninsula =

Peninsula in Antarctica

Langnes Peninsula (68°28′S 78°15′E) is a narrow rocky peninsula in Antarctica. Of irregular shape, and 9 nautical miles (17 km) long, it is the northernmost of the three main peninsulas that comprise the Vestfold Hills. The name derives from "Langneset" (the long point), applied by the Lars Christensen Expedition (1936–37) which mapped the peninsula from aerial photographs.
