= PŠC Pezinok =

Slovak football club

- Full name: Pezinský športový club Pezinok
- Nickname: Zelenobieli (The Green-and-Whites)
- Founded: 29 August 1921; 104 years ago as PŠC Pezinok
- Stadium: Pezinok City Stadium
- Capacity: 3,000
- Chairman: Ernest Mészáros
- Manager: Maroš Jakim
- League: 4. liga
- 2021/22: 3. liga, 10th of 16
- Website: pscpezinok.sk
Home colours	Away colours

PŠC Pezinok (full name Pezinský športový club Pezinok) is an amateur football club based in Pezinok, Slovakia. The club plays at the Pezinok City Stadium and competes in the third Bratislava League, the highest regional competition in Bratislava Football Association. The nickname Green-and-Whites, together with the club colors green and white, are linked to the story of the club's founding from 1921, when it was inspired by the kits of the Hungarian club Ferencváros Budapest.

The club currently has more than 380 players divided into two senior teams and 21 youth teams. Two of the teams are women teams (WU15, WU11) operating in the second league in Bratislava.

Before the start of the 2020–21 season, the representatives of the PŠC Pezinok and GFC Grinava clubs agreed to join forces in favor of football in Pezinok. PŠC Pezinok B currently plays at the Grinava Stadium and is a participant in the fifth league of the ObFZ Bratislava-vidiek Football Association. The B-team, a newcomer to the competition, entered the premiere season with considerable success. After a 5–0 victory in the last round over Suchohrad, they became the champions of the 6th ObFZ Bratislava-vidiek league.

== History ==
=== Early years (1921 - 1923) ===
The beginnings of football in Pezinok go back to 1913, when this world-famous game was brought by students from Bratislava. Firstly, the game was played with one goal, so-called “frajčula“ and the second goal was added later. The first official football match took place in Pezinok in 1919. It was organized by the crew of the Czechoslovak air unit stationed in the city. Its members played regularly at Rozálka field airport. Local enthusiasts, associated with Aladár Takács and Korineks brothers, all decided to establish a football club in 1921. After the initial preparatory steps (money collection for support, purchase of kits and balls), the Pezinský športový club (PŠC Pezinok) was founded on 29-th of August 29, 1921 at a meeting in the inn "U zeleného stromu". Ľudovít Korínek became its first chairman.

In the green-and-white jerseys inspired by Budapest's Ferencváros - allegedly the former club of Aladár Takács, with the monogram of PŠC Pezinok, they played the first friendly matches, tournaments, and also participated in championship competitions, which the club entered in 1923 (other sources states it happened in 1927). The Green-and-whites won the competition of II. class in the first year and were gradually promoted to the I.B class.

In 1923, the club formed an U19 team. Its members also included Eugen Suchoň, a famous native of Pezinok, a future composer and national artist. As a goalkeeper, he played for Pezinok until 1929.

=== Football in Pezinok during 1st Czechoslovakia (1927 – 1938) ===
The development of football in the city continued, even at the international level. In 1930, PŠC Pezinok played its first international match against the Austrian team SC Carnuntum Wiena with the score 1:3 in favour of the opponent.

Pezinok did much better in the domestic competition. In the last round of the 1930/31 season, they defeated ŠK Bratislava after a result of 3:1 and were promoted to the I.A class. In 1931, another important moment in the history of the club took place – the Rapid Pezinok club, based in Pezinok and registered with the Hungarian Football Association, officially merged with the PŠC, while the club's name remained the PŠC Pezinok.

In 1933, the Green-and-whites were promoted to the highest competition of the West Slovak county – to the 1.A class (Pezinok remained in the county competition until liberation). In the same year, the club played its third international match, this time against the Hungarian BAK TK Budapest, with a loss of 0:3. Home matches took place on the so-called "Pažiť". The strong support of the fans is evidenced by visits to home matches of approximately 1,000 spectators. Over time, the performance stagnated, the senior team went down to the district competitions and failed to follow up on the previous great performances. The club believed in an early change, but the start of World War II did not bode well for the near future of football.

=== War years (1939–1945) ===
During the Second World War, not only Pezinok, but also Slovak football in general experienced a partial decline in quality. Many promising footballers had to perform military duties in the crew or even at the front. After the establishment of the Slovak state, there was also a radical reorganization of Slovak football. The Slovak League became the highest competition in Slovakia. The lower competitions were divided into counties: Bratislava, Žilina, Zvolen and Prešov, and subsequently to other levels. If lower competitions were played at the beginning of 1939, after the attack on Poland, they were definitely reduced, as the men left for the battlefield. At this time, PŠC Pezinok was in lower league competitions, because after the outbreak of war against Poland and subsequently against the USSR, many Pezinok footballers left at the front.

After the war, the footballers returned. They had the desire and determination to achieve better results than in recent years. This is also indicated by the fact that the Green-and-whites became the autumn champions of the competition in the 1945/46 season.

=== Post-war years (1946–1961) ===
In the 1945/46 season, Pezinok was promoted to the West division of the Slovak Football Association, in today's world to the 3rd Slovak League. Already in the 1947/48 season, they became the autumn champions of the division, which aroused the interest of the fans from the whole city. In the late 1940s, PŠC fought its way into the SNL (Slovak National League). Its football base was so wide that they were able to produce quality players and even future representatives of the Czechoslovak Republic.

In the early 1950s, after the departure of several quality players and the reorganization of competitions, football in Pezinok experienced a deep decline. The club struggled with many difficulties and was relegated to district competitions. In a short period, the club changed its name three times. Firstly, to the name of Sokol Tehelne Pezinok, in 1953 to Tatran Pezinok and finally in 1956, the club was named Slovan NV Pezinok. Under the new name, the Green-and-whites won the 1.A class in 1956 and were promoted to the regional competition. The coach of the team was Karol Šefčík. Since 1959, the player-coach role has been represented by national team player of two countries, Bulgaria and Czechoslovakia, the legendary Bozhin Laskov. Together with Karol Šefčík, they both are the most famous personalities based in Pezinok in the post-war years.

=== Swing period (1962–1990) ===
In the 1960s and 1970s, the senior team, under the new name Lokomotíva Pezinok, was mainly in the competitions of the West Slovak region, and after reorganizations in the divisional competition. At the beginning of 1961, Bozhin Laskov was replaced by old-new coach Karol Šefčík, who managed to stay with the team in the division until 1967. After that successful era, was replaced by relegations into regional competitions and a decade of futile attempts to return to the division. The club had two senior teams, but also an excellent stadium, which hosted several mutual matches between Pezinok and the Czechoslovak national football team.

In 1979, the Green-and-whites, under the leadership of coach Vladimír Korček, managed to advance to the division (2nd Slovak National League). Time spent in the division was accompanied by alternating successes, as during the next few years until 1987, Pezinok was promoted a total of four times and relegated four times, as well. In addition, they were not successful even in lower competitions, as they were relegated to I.A class. In 1984, there was an organizational change in the form of separation from Lokomotíva and the subsequent establishment of Stavbár Pezinok.

=== At the turn of the millennium (1991–2005) ===
In 1991, a new committee led by František Slezák decided to return to the historical name of the club - PŠC Pezinok. Between 1991 and 2000, Pezinok was playing at the level of the third, fourth and fifth highest leagues. Initially, they played matches with opponents from “Záhorie“ (area located to the north from Malé Karpaty mountain) and "Žitný ostrov" (area located in the south of Slovakia). Later, the competitions were reorganized within the Bratislava Football Association, and a new 4th league was created, in which PŠC Pezinok also operated. The Green-and-whites bet on a young team that was better season by season, which culminated in the promotion to the 3rd Bratislava League. Between 1994 and 1997, the team stabilized and played football, which was attended by about 800 spectators.

At the beginning of the third millennium, the senior team alternated between better seasons and worse ones. The worse were identical in the bad autumn parts of season and excellent spring parts. The team saved the competition at the last minute. The better seasons were in the spirit of stable performances throughout the season with the final place in the middle of the table.

=== Promotions and relegations (2006–2016) ===
After the reorganization of the football competitions, Pezinok was playing in the third league, but in the hierarchy, it represented the fourth highest competition. In the 2006/07 season, the well-composed squad and coach Peter Kučerka managed to win promotion to the 2nd Slovak league. Hard newcomer times culminated into decline and many coaching exchanges. The re-entry came in the 2009–10 season. This time, Pezinok managed to maintain the competition for the next two years. The successful period was also underlined by the Slovak Cup match against ŠK Slovan Bratislava in the autumn of 2011, in which the best club in Slovakia won only 0–1.

In the following period, football in Pezinok declined greatly. As a result of non-football disputes, the club lost partners, supporters and the senior team was relegated to the 5th highest competition. At that moment, the attention was focused on talented teenagers, mostly with the year of birth 1995. The inexperienced, but determined team was taken over by coach Daniel Federl, who started a beautiful football story with the young offspring. In its first season, the team took 11th place, the following year 3rd place. The team also benefited from the reorganization of competitions, when the 4th league (5th highest) became the fourth highest competition. The quality performances of the offspring with a green-and-white heart resulted in absolute dominance in the 2014/15 season, when they deservedly became the champions of the 4th league. The return to the regional elite was also accompanied by the Slovak Cup duel against the then Slovak champion AS Trenčín, who were also active in the preliminary rounds of the UEFA Champions League at that time. Even a clear loss left no scars on the team and the players quickly switched to the league competition, in which they took 8th place.

=== New era (2017–present) ===
The senior A-team managed to stabilize in the highest regional competition. Pezinok faced the most attractive opponent in September 2019, when they hosted the first league team FK Senica in the Slovak Cup. Although the Green-and-whites lost, they left a good impression and were bravely fighting against the favorite.

The coach of the A-team is Daniel Federl, who has been in charge for 8 years with half-year breaks in 2017 and 2019. He can also rely on cooperation with the newly formed senior B-team, which was formed at the beginning of the 2020/21 season. The creation of the B-team is related to the joining of forces with the GFC Grinava football club. The "B" team became the champions of the 6th league in the premiere season and as a rookie immediately advanced to the higher competition.

The new era of Pezinok football was marked by the coronavirus pandemic with restrictions in training process and matches. The 2019–20 and 2020–21 seasons did not go as planned and only half of the matches were played.

In August 2021, the club celebrated the 100th anniversary of its founding. PŠC Pezinok organized an exhibition of historical materials and published the first publication about the club's century-long history. Due to anti-pandemic restrictions, the club organized a sport and cultural event in 2022, which was an important milestone in the club's history. The 100th anniversary celebrations were the biggest football event in recent decades in Pezinok.

The current coach of the A-team is Maroš Jakim, starting from the new season 2022–23.

=== Historical names ===
From	To	Club's name
1921	1948	PŠC Pezinok
1948	1953	Sokol Tehelne Pezinok
1953	1956	Tatran Pezinok
1956	1961	Slovan NV Pezinok
1961	1984	Lokomotíva Pezinok
1984	1991	Stavbár Pezinok
1991	-	PŠC Pezinok

== Rivalries ==
The main rivals were mostly teams from Záhorie. In the 1980s, Pezinok was part of Western competitions, so its rivals were mainly Malacky, Jakubov and Jablonové. Matches against these clubs have always been harsh and were characterized by a fighting mentality, the so-called "kopanica".

The most famous derby matches are against CFK Pezinok Cajla and ŠK Svätý Jur. The duels are not as harsh as against the teams from Záhorie. However, the matches always attract spectators from all over the Pezinok district and mostly have a friendly atmosphere.

== Club badge and colors ==
The first club logo was spotted in the pre-match Bulletin of the Lokomotíva Pezinok, in 1961. Since then, there have been four changes, first in 1983 when the name of the club was renamed to Stavbár Pezinok, then in 1991 when the name of the club PŠC Pezinok was given back, then in 2006 during the first redesign and last in 2009, as the second redesign. The club colors are green and white, the choice of which is linked to the story of the club's founding. These colors in the club logo are complemented by a shade of black, which forms the middle vertical stripe. It is surrounded on both sides by green vertical stripes. In addition to the stripes, the logo consists of the name of the club, a ball and the text of the year the club was founded - 1921.

The colors of the club from Pezinok were determined immediately upon its establishment. A group of enthusiasts, Aladar Takacs, brothers Korineks and others traveled to Budapest, where they bought the first sets of kits and balls. The kits of the first team were white with green transversal strips, following Ferencváros Budapest training kits. Since then, Pezinok have been faithful to their "green-white" color combination.

== Grounds ==
=== 1921–present: Pezinok City Stadium ===
Pezinok City Stadium was the first and only field on which PŠC Pezinok played its home matches. Initially, the matches were played on the territory of today's training field. In 1934, an approximately two-meter wooden fence was built around the pitch, which can be seen in several historical photographs.

In 1959, the ground was moved from today's training field closer to Komenského Street. During the construction of the grandstand together with the changing rooms which started this year, the home matches were played here on the "new stadium". In 1961, the grandstand, which the Pezinok supporters built themselves, was officially opened.

Between 2006 and 2010, a training field with lighting and irrigation was built, an artificial training field with lighting and half of the stadium's interior was renovated. In 2019, the second half of the interior was reconstructed, the so-called youth section.

Nowadays, the sports area consists of the main field sports ground, training pitch and small pitch with artificial grass. Pezinok City Stadium is still home ground of PŠC Pezinok and with a capacity of 3,000, it is the largest club football stadium in Pezinok. At this level, this sports area is considered as one of the best in the league. In addition, the stadium also hosted many cultural events and concerts in the past.

=== 2020–present: Grinava Stadium ===
The home club playing in Grinava Stadium was the local GFC Grinava, almost since the founding of the club. The pitch was built in the 1930s and 1940s, when the surface on today's Myslenická Street was modified. Between 1954 and 1955, player cabins were also built.

Before the start of the 2020/21 season, the representatives of the PŠC Pezinok and GFC Grinava clubs agreed to join forces in favor of football in city of Pezinok. Mutual cooperation concerned the management of clubs, men's teams, youth teams, as well as sports facilities. The youth teams, as well as the senior B-team, use the Grinava Stadium for the training process and matches. Nowadays, the stadium has two grandstands, both with seating possibility.

== Results ==
Notes: Pl - Played matches, W - Wins, D - Draws, L - Losses, GS - Goals Scored, GA - Goals Against, +/- - Score, P - points, Red highlight - relegation, Green highlight - promotion, Purple highlight - competition reorganized

Czechoslovakia (1933–1993)
Season	League	Level	Pl	W	D	L	GS	GA	+/-	P	Position
1957–58	I. A trieda ZsFZ - sk. Jih	4	33	18	7	8	74	30	44	43	1.
1958–59	Divízia E	3	26	10	3	13	35	56	-21	23	11.
1959–60	Divízia E	3	26	13	6	7	46	41	5	32	3.
1960–61	Divízia E	3	26	8	7	11	28	40	-12	23	9.
1961–62	Divízia E	3	26	8	7	11	27	49	-22	23	10.
1962–63	Krajský přebor - sk. Západ	3	26	10	7	9	40	37	+3	27	4.
1963–64	Krajský přebor - sk. Západ	3	26	10	5	11	34	32	+2	25	8.
1964–65	Krajský přebor - sk. Západ	3	23	8	9	6	32	30	+2	25	7.
1965–66	Divízia E	3	28	9	6	13	27	48	-21	24	11.
1966–67	Divízia E	3	26	8	5	13	29	44	-15	21	13.
1967–68	Krajský přebor - sk. Západ	4	26	6	6	14	17	40	-23	18	14.
1968–69	I. A trieda ZsFZ - sk. Jih	5	26	9	6	11	30	31	-1	24	8.
1969–70	Krajský přebor - sk. Bratislava	5	26	12	6	8	37	32	+5	30	4.
1970–71	Krajský přebor - sk. Bratislava	5	26	18	3	5	57	20	+37	39	2.
1971–72	Krajský přebor - sk. Bratislava	5	26	14	11	1	49	19	+30	39	2.
1972–73	Krajský přebor - sk. Bratislava	5	26	12	3	11	48	43	+5	27	7.
1973–74	Krajský přebor - sk. Bratislava	5	26	11	5	10	49	47	+2	27	3.
1974–75	Krajský přebor - sk. Bratislava	5	26	10	2	14	40	48	-8	22	9.
1975–76	Krajský přebor - sk. Bratislava	5	26	12	8	6	42	29	+13	32	2.
1976–77	Krajský přebor - sk. Bratislava	5	26	8	5	13	49	50	-1	21	11.
1977–78	Krajský přebor - sk. Bratislava	4	26	17	2	7	54	35	+19	36	3.
1978–79	Krajský přebor - sk. Bratislava	4	26	18	6	2	55	13	+42	42	1.
1979–80	Divízia - sk. Západ	3	22	3	7	12	24	47	-23	13	12.
1980–81	Krajský přebor - sk. Bratislava	4	26	18	6	2	55	19	+36	42	1.
1981–82	2. SNFL - sk. Západ	3	30	7	6	17	35	52	-17	20	16.
1982–83	Krajský přebor - sk. Bratislava	5	26	18	6	2	63	23	+40	42	1.
1983–84	2. SNFL - sk. Západ	3	30	12	7	11	37	35	+2	31	8.
1984–85	2. SNFL - sk. Západ	3	30	6	6	18	38	63	-25	18	15.
1985–86	Divízia - sk. Západ (Bratislava "B")	4	26	20	4	2	84	17	+67	44	1.
1986–87	2. SNFL - sk. Západ	3	30	9	9	12	32	41	-9	27	16.
1987–88	Divízia - sk. Západ	4	30	13	5	12	37	45	-8	31	8.
1988–89	Divízia - sk. Západ	4	30	11	7	12	28	45	-17	29	9.
1989–90	Divízia - sk. Západ	4	30	10	6	14	37	50	-13	26	15.
1990–91	I. A trieda ZsFZ - sk. Juhovýchod	5	30	13	3	14	39	52	-13	29	11.
1991–92	I. A trieda ZsFZ - sk. Juhovýchod	5	30	13	9	8	36	33	+3	35	6.
1992–93	I. A trieda BFZ	5	30	7	6	17	38	52	-14	20	14.
Slovakia (1993 – )
Season	League	Level	Pl	W	D	L	GS	GA	+/-	P	Position
1993–94	4. liga BFZ	4	30	17	8	5	47	25	+22	42	3.
1994–95	3. liga - sk. Bratislava	3	28	6	10	12	21	46	-25	28	11.
1995–96	3. liga - sk. Bratislava	3	30	11	10	9	44	44	0	43	8.
1996–97	3. liga - sk. Bratislava	3	30	9	5	16	36	50	-14	32	13.
1997–98	3. liga - sk. Bratislava	3	34	12	7	15	42	59	-17	43	15.
1998–99	3. liga - sk. Bratislava	4	30	24	4	2	90	15	75	76	1.
1999–2000	3. liga - sk. Bratislava	3	28	8	6	14	35	57	-22	30	12.
2000–01	3. liga - sk. Bratislava	3	30	12	5	13	39	55	-16	41	10.
2001–02	3. liga - sk. Bratislava	3	30	10	7	13	41	58	-17	37	11.
2002–03	3. liga - sk. Bratislava	3	30	13	6	11	35	40	-5	39	9.
2003–04	3. liga - sk. Bratislava	3	30	8	5	17	35	65	-30	29	13.
2004–05	3. liga - sk. Bratislava	3	30	8	6	16	38	63	-25	30	12.
2005–06	3. liga - sk. Bratislava	3	30	13	4	13	41	47	-6	43	9.
2006–07	3. liga - sk. Bratislava	3	26	18	6	2	57	18	39	60	1.
2007–08	2. liga - sk. Západ	3	30	5	11	14	25	50	-25	26	16.
2008–09	3. liga - sk. Bratislava	3	26	15	7	4	57	20	37	52	3.
2009–10	3. liga - sk. Bratislava	3	24	19	2	3	61	13	48	59	1.
2010–11	2. liga - sk. Západ	3	30	10	6	14	33	43	-10	36	12.
2011–12	3. liga - sk. Západ	3	28	9	7	12	23	34	-11	34	12.
2012–13	4. liga BFZ - sk. B	5	24	8	5	11	36	40	-4	29	11.
2013–14	4. liga BFZ - sk. B	5	24	11	6	7	42	26	+16	39	3.
2014–15	4. liga BFZ - sk. B	4	26	17	6	3	57	15	+42	57	1.
2015–16	3. liga - sk. Bratislava	3	30	12	7	11	47	46	+1	43	8.
2016–17	3. liga - sk. Bratislava	3	30	9	7	14	35	65	-30	34	13.
2017–18	3. liga - sk. Bratislava	3	30	7	8	15	33	50	-17	26	13.
2018–19	3. liga - sk. Bratislava	3	30	10	8	12	37	51	-14	38	11.
2019–20	3. liga - sk. Bratislava	3	15	2	3	10	20	41	-21	9	15.
2020–21	3. liga - sk. Bratislava	3	15	6	3	6	32	30	2	21	9.
2021–22	3. liga - sk. Bratislava	3	30	8	8	14	39	51	-12	32	10.
2022–23	IV. liga Bratislava	4									

== Hall of Fame ==
Inductees in PŠC Pezinok Hall of Fame
Year of induction	Player	Role at PŠC	Years in role at PŠC
2019	Vojtech Bauer	player	1942 - 1947, 1959 - 1961
2019	Štefan Slezák	coach, player	1953 - 1959, 1981 - 1983
2019	Karol Šefčík	coach, player	1957 - 1959, 1961 - 1967
2019	Peter Poláček	board member, coach, player	1966 - 1968, 1992 - 1995
2019	Peter Michalec	player	1966 - 1968, 1990 - 2000
2019	Anton Pilka	coach, player	1956 - 1964, 1977 - 1990
2019	Milan Mlynek	player	1953 - 1969
2020	Peter Slimák	chairman, coach, player	1978 - 2018
2020	Jozef Hotový	player	1946 - 1963
2022	Ján Guštafík	board member, team staff, grounds manager	1983 - 1999, 2016 - today
2022	Dušan Berzedi	chairman, board member, coach	1982 - 2018
2022	Daniel Kanka	player	1969 - 1979, 1981 - 1992
