= Sološnica =

Sološnica Széleskút
- Municipality
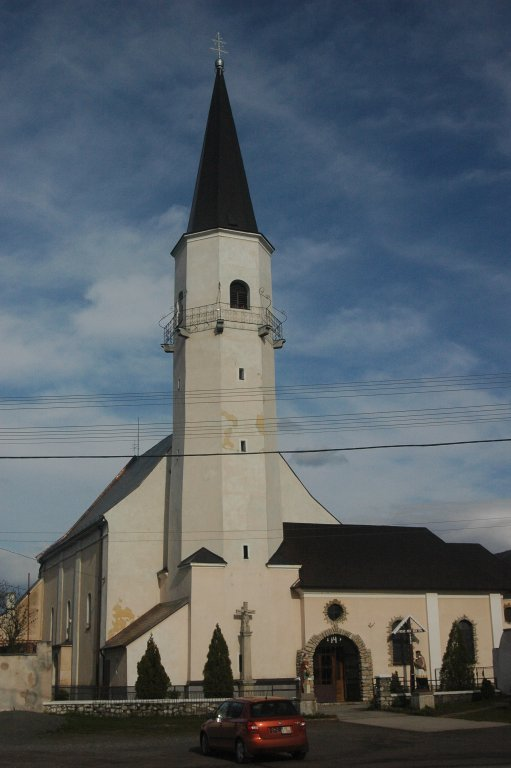
- All Saints Catholic Church

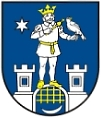
- Flag Coat of arms

- Location of Sološnica in the Bratislava Region Location of Sološnica in Slovakia
- Coordinates: 48.46°N 17.24°E
- Country: Slovakia
- Region: Bratislava Region
- District: Malacky District
- First mentioned: 1367

Government
  - Mayor: Anna Čermáková

Area
  - Total: 37.74 km^{2} (14.57 sq mi)
- Elevation: 221 m (725 ft)

Population (2025)
  - Total: 1,658
- Time zone: UTC+1 (CET)
  - Summer (DST): UTC+2 (CEST)
- Postal code: 906 37
- Area code: +421 34
- Vehicle registration plate (until 2022): MA
- Website: www.solosnica.sk

Sološnica (German: Breitenbrunn; Hungarian: Széleskút) is a village and municipality in western Slovakia in Malacky District in the Bratislava Region.

== Geography ==
The municipality lies at an altitude of 221 metres (725 ft) and covers an area of 37.74 km^{2} (14.57 sq mi) (2025).

== Profile ==
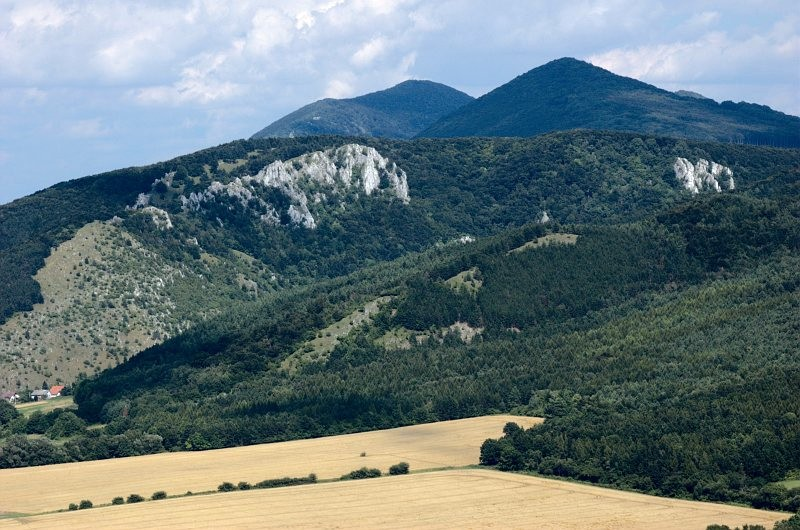
Little Carpathians around the Plavecký hrad Castle

Sološnica lies at the foot of the northwestern side of the Malé Karpaty (Little Carpathians) Mountains at an altitude of 291 m above sea level. Southeast of the village is the majestic peak, Vápenná (Roštún National Nature Reserve), rising 748 m sharply up from the lowlands. Beautiful surroundings draw tourists, who admire the cliffs Little and Great Vápennej as well as the Roštún State Reservation, located in the cadastral area of Sološnica and Plavecké Podhradie. Within this range are the Great Vápennej and Čertova Valley. It was proclaimed in 1953 to encompass 109 ha. A new decree in 1988 amended the boundaries. Today it covers 333.31 ha. It was established to protect the karst phenomena, preserve the forests of the Little Carpathians, and protect endangered species.

== History ==
The first time Sološnica was mentioned was in 1367. The beginning of its existence is closely connected with an internal colonization at the beginning of the 14th century. Sološnica had several different names throughout the centuries, some of which are Zeleskut, Pratunprun (1367), Zyleskut (1371), Solossnicza (1773) or Széleskút from the Hungarian language, where széles stands for broad and kút means well (presumably a watering place for grazing cattle). The German name Breitenbrunn (not to be confused with Breitenbrunn, Austria) also corresponds with the similar translation of the parts of this compound word referring to its name (breit means broad and brunn means well or spring). The Hungarian form of the name had the most important impact on forming the Slovak version. The word soľ referring to the salt connected to the suffix -nica created the complete Slovak version of the name for the village. There is even a particular area within the village called Slanisko, the word stem of which word is obviously "salt or salty".

Sološnica belonged to the earls from Svätý Jur and Pezinok, earldom of Serédy inhabiting Plavecký Castle, earldom of Balass and later on to the earldom of Plavec (there were several families and their generations that were changed throughout the years as its owners). From the 17th century on, Plavecký Castle and the nearby villages had been registered in the ownership of the Pálfys.

According to the charter named "Colonia sub montem Rachsturm" from 1478, there was a settlement called "Hólint" located under the hill called "Rošturm" within the area of Sološnica. This settlement was occupied by forest workers of German origin called "holchokari. There were about 20 houses made of wood. The settlement went through a little bit of decadence and decline after 1781 when the Patent of Toleration was declared. This document did not allow establishment of an evangelic chapel that would be used for praying and worship in places where there were not at least a hundred evangelic families. Therefore, the majority of the population of this settlement moved either to Sološnica or to Pezinok. There are many of their descendants living in Sološnica even today.

In 1828 there were 205 houses and the population of Sološnica was 1484. These people were primarily engaged in agriculture, weaving, furriery, and calcinations which continued until 1950. The production and manufacture of wooden tools was also very popular among people back then and thus has continued into the present.

=== Natural disasters ===
Sološnica has gone through and already witnessed several disasters. In 1857 a huge and disastrous fire broke out. In about half an hour, most of the houses already caught fire because their roofs were made from straw. 12 people died as a result of this terrible fire. There were only six houses and the church left afterwards. In 1861 during the celebrations devoted to the Holy Ghost there was a strong storm with heavy rain which resulted in the level of the Sološnica Stream rising and flooding a substantial part of the village.

Lots of inhabitants of Sološnica had a very hard time and suffered a lot during the Austro-Prussian War in 1866. The Prussian troops were marching from Moravia towards Trnava and there were numerous fights going on. A great number of the dead were not buried which resulted in cholera being spread gradually all around Záhorie. About 149 people died in Sološnica as a result of being infected with cholera from August 29 to November 14, 1866.

In the spring of 1909, there was a severe landslide in the land area called "Na Jamách" and "Nížiny". Another landslide also occurred in 1936.

=== World War I ===
World War I brought along plenty of hardship, suffering, and famine, as well as poverty for the local people. Around 180 men were gradually drafted from Sološnica and they fought on the Serbian front. Some of them were reported missing and 43 men died while fighting on the front. In order to commemorate this significant event, a memorial was built in 1931 by the village with the help of the money collected among its inhabitants.

== Population ==
Population statistic (10 years)
Year	1995	2005	2015	2025
Count	1452	1522	1551	1658
Difference		+4.82%	+1.90%	+6.89%

Population statistic
Year	2024	2025
Count	1662	1658
Difference		−0.24%

It has a population of 1658 people (31 December 2025).

=== Ethnicity ===
Census 2021 (1+ %)
Ethnicity	Number	Fraction
Slovak	1609	96.28%
Not found out	50	2.99%
Total	1671	

In year 2021 was 1671 people by ethnicity 1609 as Slovak, 50 as Not found out, 16 as Czech, 9 as Hungarian, 4 as Russian, 3 as Ukrainian, 3 as Romani, 3 as Polish, 2 as Romanian, 1 as Serbian, 1 as Rusyn, 1 as Moravian, 1 as Other and 1 as French.

Note on population: The difference values of population numbers in the table "Population statistic" and in the sections "Ethnicity" & "Religion" is caused by the use of various statistical methods.

=== Religion ===
Census 2021 (1+ %)
Religion	Number	Fraction
Roman Catholic Church	1173	70.2%
None	395	23.64%
Not found out	43	2.57%
Evangelical Church	21	1.26%
Total	1671	

In year 2021 was 1671 people by religion 1173 from Roman Catholic Church, 395 from None, 43 from Not found out, 21 from Evangelical Church, 9 from Greek Catholic Church, 7 from Other, 5 from Ad hoc movements, 4 from Christian Congregations in Slovakia, 3 from Calvinist Church, 3 from Eastern Orthodox Church, 2 from Hinduism, 1 from Old Catholic Church, 1 from Other and not ascertained christian church, 1 from Islam, 1 from Seventh-day Adventist Church, 1 from Buddhism and 1 from Apostolic Church.

== Landmarks ==
There are two important historic landmarks located in the village:

- All Saints Church

Dates back to the 14th century when it is considered to have originated. The new church was built on the foundations of the old one in 1699. It was dedicated to All Saints' Day. It was built in the baroque style. The church has been reconstructed and undergone various changes until now. The painting comes from the years between 1880 and 1890.

- The sawmill left after Mr. Alexander Nottný from 1880

In 1720 there was a mill in the village, in the 18th century there was a papermill widely used, in the 19th century a distillery was built and the manorial grange was established.

== Gallery ==
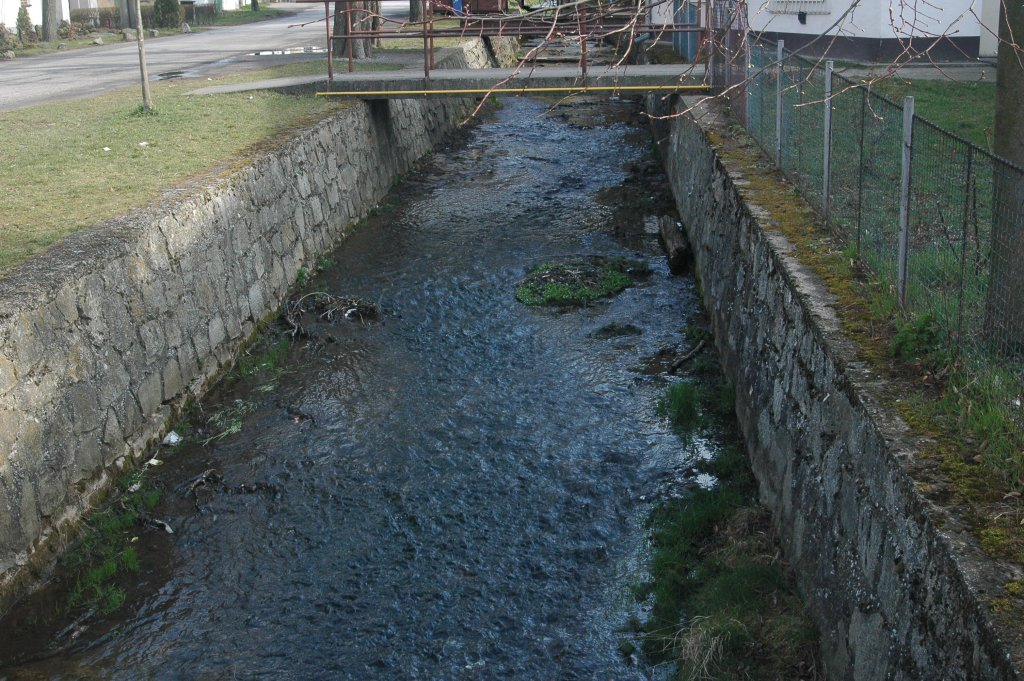
Stream Sološnícký potok

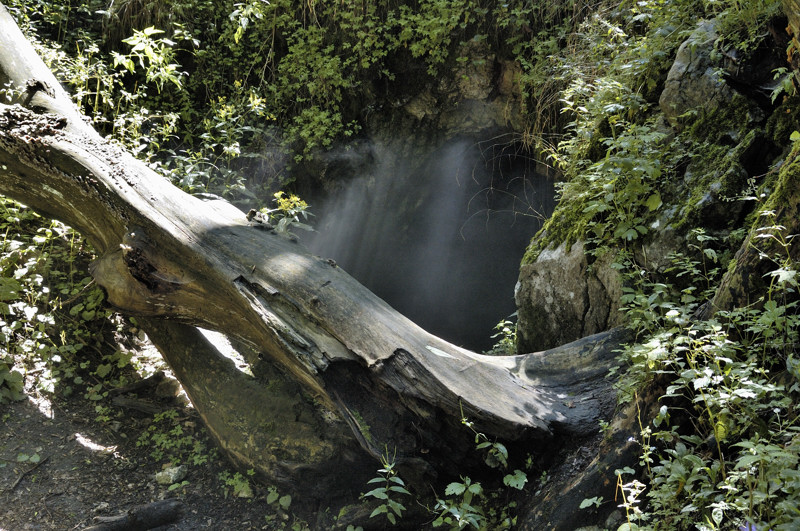
Cave Haviareň

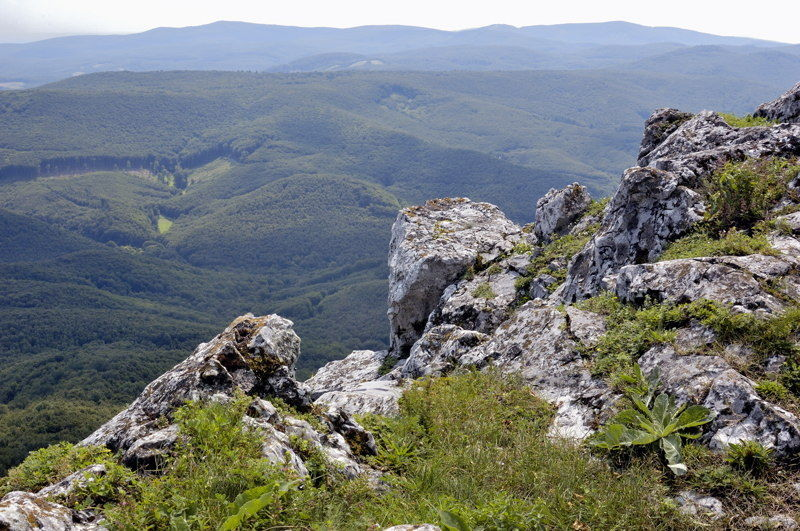
Mount Vápenná

== Surrounding municipalities ==
- Senica
- Jablonica
- Cerová
- Prievaly

- Plavecký Peter
- Plavecký Mikuláš
- Rohožník
- Malacky

- Kuchyňa
- Pernek

== See also ==
- Červený Kameň Castle
