= Rudava =

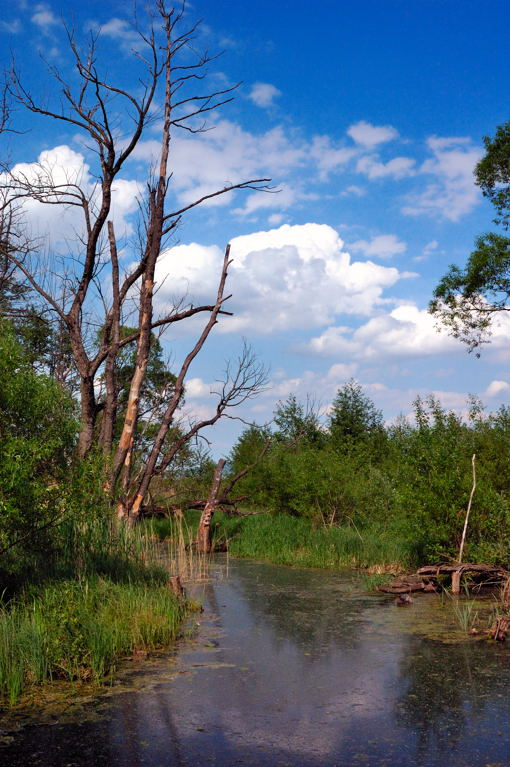

Location
- Country: Slovakia

Physical characteristics
- Mouth: Morava
  - coordinates: 48.4956°N 16.9176°E
- Length: 47.3 km (29.4 mi)
- Basin size: 418 km^{2} (161 sq mi)

Basin features
- Progression: Morava→ Danube→ Black Sea

Rudava is a river in western Slovakia, Záhorie region. It is a left tributary to the river Morava. Part of this river flows through the military district of Záhorie. It is 47.3 km (29.4 mi) long and its basin size is 418 km^{2} (161 sq mi).

== Etymology ==
The name comes from Slavic ruda—red soil or red creek. 1592 fluv. Rudauua.
