= ŠK Lozorno =

Slovak football club

- Full name: ŠK Lozorno
- Founded: 1922
- Ground: Športový areál Lozorno; Lozorno
- Capacity: 950
- Head coach: Rudolf Rehák
- League: 3. liga
- 2013–14: 7th

ŠK Lozorno is a Slovak football team, based in the town of Lozorno. The club was founded in 1922.

== Notable players ==
Had international caps for their respective countries.

- (Slovakia) Kamil Susko
