= Kostolište =

Kostolište Egyházhely
- Municipality
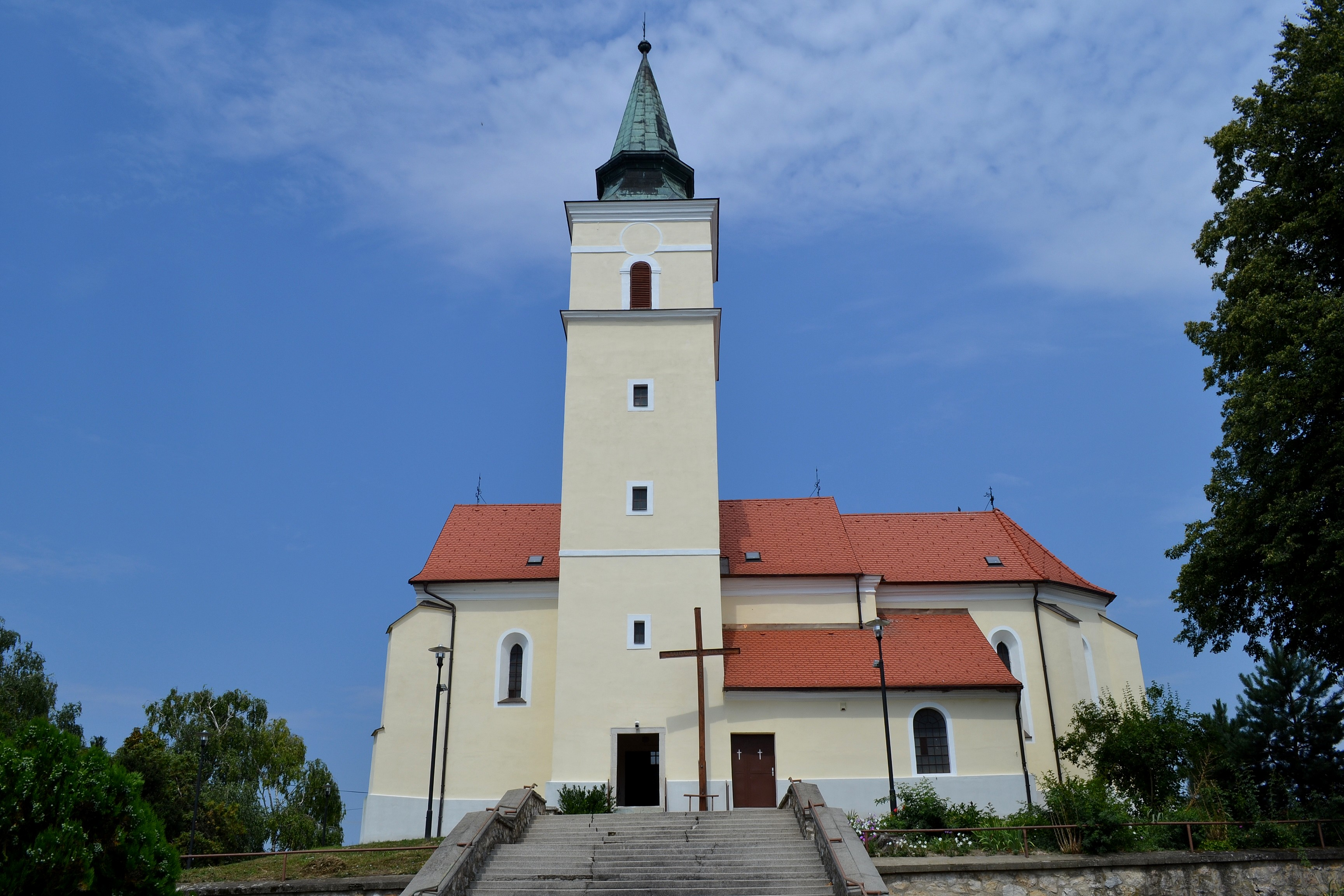
- Saint Martin's Church

- Flag

- Location of Kostolište in the Bratislava Region Location of Kostolište in Slovakia
- Coordinates: 48.45°N 16.99°E
- Country: Slovakia
- Region: Bratislava Region
- District: Malacky District
- First mentioned: 1271

Area
  - Total: 16.82 km^{2} (6.49 sq mi)
- Elevation: 157 m (515 ft)

Population (2025)
  - Total: 2,379
- Time zone: UTC+1 (CET)
  - Summer (DST): UTC+2 (CEST)
- Postal code: 900 62
- Area code: +421 34
- Vehicle registration plate (until 2022): MA
- Website: www.kostoliste.sk

Kostolište (Hungarian: Egyházhely) is a village in Malacky District in the Bratislava Region of western Slovakia close to the town of Malacky, north-west of Slovakia's capital Bratislava.

== Geography ==
The municipality lies at an altitude of 157 metres (515 ft) and covers an area of 16.82 km^{2} (6.49 sq mi) (2025).

== Names and etymology ==
The name comes from German Kirchplatz, Kirchenplatz (1423 Kirchle, 1488 Kyryhporcz, 1561 Kripoletz, etc.).). Older Slovak name Krýpolec, Kiripolec (the official name 1920–1948) is a phonetic adaptation. In 1948, the village was renamed to Kostolište by translation of the German name.

== Population ==
Population statistic (10 years)
Year	1995	2005	2015	2025
Count	866	1066	1411	2379
Difference		+23.09%	+32.36%	+68.60%

Population statistic
Year	2024	2025
Count	2344	2379
Difference		+1.49%

It has a population of 2379 people (31 December 2025).

=== Ethnicity ===
Census 2021 (1+ %)
Ethnicity	Number	Fraction
Slovak	1685	95.3%
Not found out	70	3.95%
Total	1768	

In year 2021 was 1768 people by ethnicity 1685 as Slovak, 70 as Not found out, 11 as Czech, 8 as Other, 6 as Ukrainian, 6 as Hungarian, 5 as Serbian, 4 as Italian, 4 as Russian, 3 as Turkish, 3 as Rusyn, 2 as Moravian, 1 as Vietnamese, 1 as Romani, 1 as German and 1 as Canadian.

Note on population: The difference values of population numbers in the table "Population statistic" and in the sections "Ethnicity" & "Religion" is caused by the use of various statistical methods.

=== Religion ===
Census 2021 (1+ %)
Religion	Number	Fraction
Roman Catholic Church	1062	60.07%
None	551	31.17%
Not found out	87	4.92%
Greek Catholic Church	18	1.02%
Total	1768	

In year 2021 was 1768 people by religion 1062 from Roman Catholic Church, 551 from None, 87 from Not found out, 18 from Greek Catholic Church, 13 from Eastern Orthodox Church, 12 from Evangelical Church, 6 from Other, 5 from Ad hoc movements, 4 from Baptists Church, 3 from Christian Congregations in Slovakia, 2 from Calvinist Church, 2 from Other and not ascertained christian church, 1 from Paganism and natural spirituality, 1 from Buddhism and 1 from Bahá'i Community.

== Famous people ==
- Martin Benka, painter

== Genealogical resources ==
The records for genealogical research are available at the state archive "Statny Archiv in Bratislava, Slovakia"

- Roman Catholic church records (births/marriages/deaths): 1870-1895 (parish B)

== See also ==
- List of municipalities and towns in Slovakia
