= Kamil Susko =

Slovak footballer (born 1974)

Personal information
- Date of birth: 6 November 1974 (age 51)
- Place of birth: Bratislava, Czechoslovakia
- Height: 1.90 m (6 ft 3 in)
- Position: Goalkeeper

Youth career
- 1982–1992: Slovan Bratislava
- 1992–1994: Tatran Devín

Senior career*
| Years | Team | Apps | (Gls) |
| 1994–1995 | Trenčín | | |
| 1995–1998 | Inter Bratislava | 24 | (0) |
| 1997–2000 | Spartak Trnava | 85 | (0) |
| 2000–2002 | Baník Ostrava | 23 | (0) |
| 2002–2003 | PAOK | 0 | (0) |
| 2003–2004 | Sepahan | 31 | (0) |
| 2007–2009 | Kapfenberger SV | 24 | (0) |
| 2009–2010 | SV Wienerberg | 16 | (0) |
| 2010–2012 | ŠK Lozorno | 8 | (0) |
| 2012–2014 | TJ Závod | | |

International career
| 1999–2000 | Slovakia | 16 | (0) |
- * Club domestic league appearances and goals

Kamil Susko (born 6 November 1974) is a Slovak former professional footballer who played as a goalkeeper. He made 16 appearances for the Slovakia national team in 1999 and 2000.
