= Martin Benka =

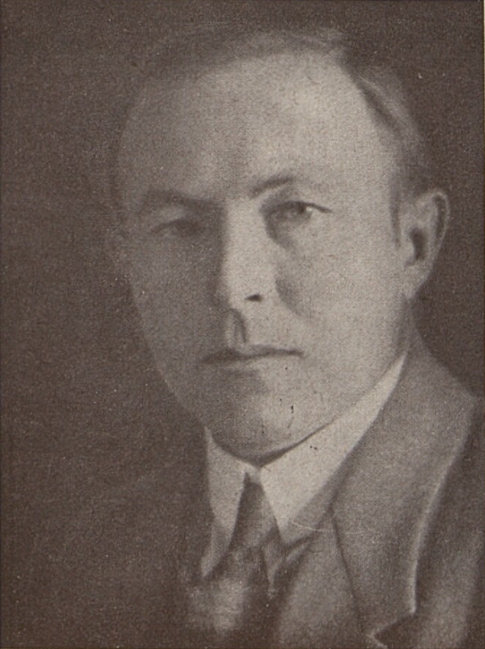
Martin Benka (1927)

Martin Benka (21 September 1888 – 28 June 1971) was a Slovak painter, illustrator, art teacher and Esperantist. He is generally considered to be the founder of Modernist 20th-century Slovak painting.

== Biography ==
Benka was born on 21 September 1888 in Kostolište. He was the youngest of six children born to Jozef and Eva Benka, née Dubničkova. From 1903 to 1906, he was apprenticed as a house painter in Hodonín, and served his journeyman years in Vienna from 1906 to 1909. During this time, he began paying visits to a private art studio. A journalist named Jan Josef Langner (1861-1919) saw his work and was sufficiently impressed to offer financial assistance. This enabled him to take lessons at a private landscape painting school in Prague, operated by Alois Kalvoda.

He acquired his first studio in Prague in 1914. During World War I, he lived with a friend in Miloňovice. His first independent exhibit was held in Rohatec in 1915. After the war, he returned to Prague, where he lived until 1939. He became involved with the Association of Slovak Artists in 1920, and travelled extensively. In 1937, he participated in the Exposition Internationale des Arts et Techniques dans la Vie Moderne.

Shortly after the beginning of World War II, he settled in Martin. From 1940 to 1941, he was a Professor of drawing and painting at the Slovak University of Technology in Bratislava. After the war he received the title "National Artist" from the Czechoslovak People's Republic. In 1958, he was provided with a country home, studio and gallery near Martin, at state expense. That same year his autobiography, Za umením (For Art), was published.

While visiting old friends in his home town, he fell ill and died at the hospital in Malacky on 8 June 1971. He is buried in the National Cemetery in Martin.

== Style and method ==
Benka's ornamental style, which was influenced by folk art, contrasted sharply with the functional and purist approach of the German Bauhaus and Russian avant-garde movements of that time. A contemporary of the famous Czech generation of cubist artists, he lived in Prague for 30 years. Along with Ľudovít Fulla, Mikuláš Galanda, and the Czech Jaroslav Vodrážka, he created Modernist Slovak typography. Overall, he created between forty and sixty different fonts.

While searching for characteristic features, forms and colors of Slovakia, he would visit regions where people lived simply, in communion with nature. He would often travel around the countryside, documenting rural life and nature in his works, many of which he did outdoors and spontaneously. His home in the country, where he lived from 1959 to 1971, is now The Martin Benka Museum as outlined in his will, in which he bequeathed his works to the state.

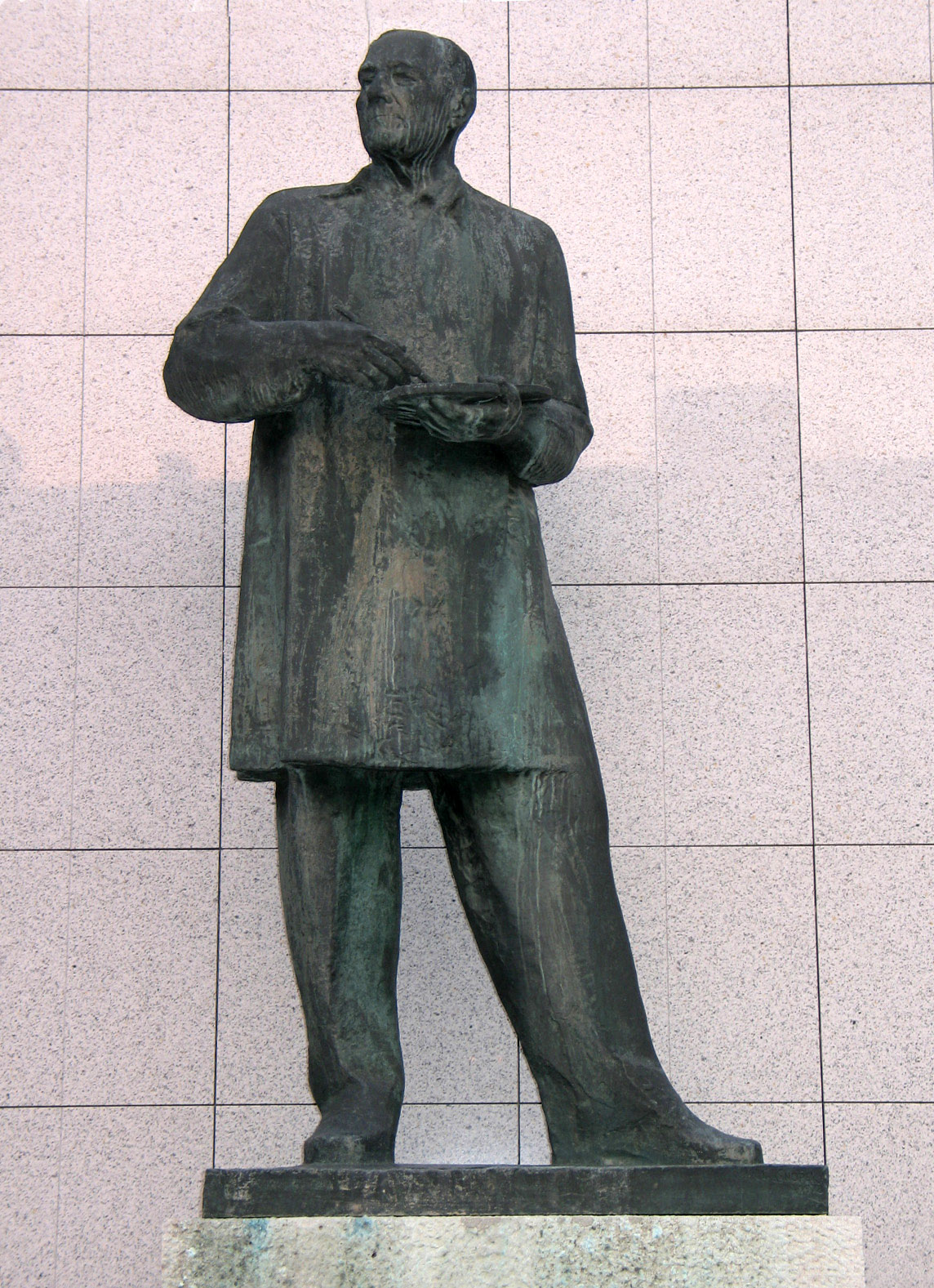
Statue of Benka by Ladislav Snopek, in Bratislava (2008)

== Notable paintings ==
- Cestou k salašu (On the Road to a Sheep Farm)
- Rieka Orava (The Orava River)
- Jeseň na Spiši (Fall in Spiš)
- Dve ženy (Two women)
- Na pole (Into the Field)
- Drevári pod Ďumbierom (Woodcutters below Ďumbier Mountain)
- Po búrke (After the storm)
