= Malé Leváre =

Malé Leváre Kislévárd
- Municipality
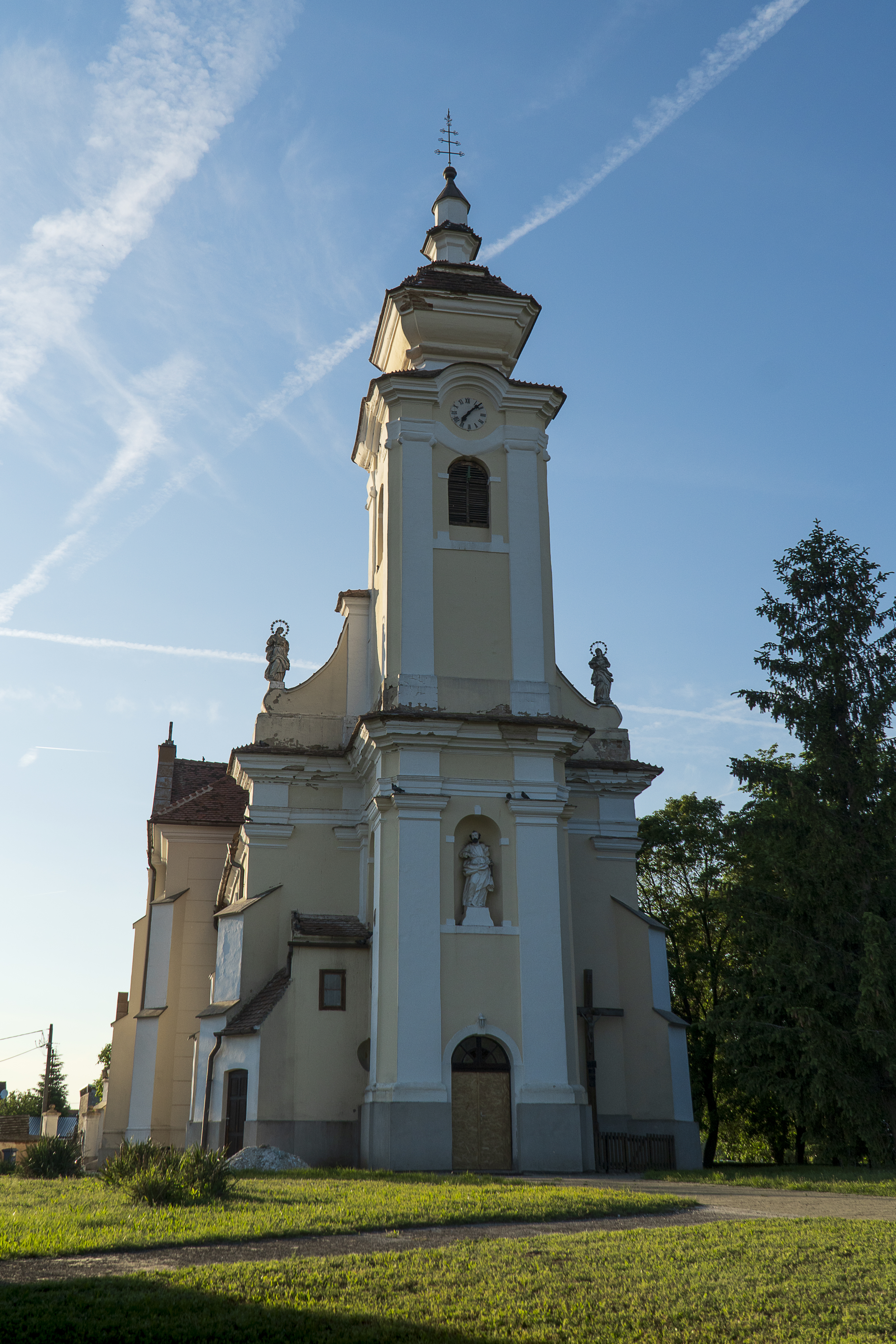
- Church in Malé Leváre

- Location of Malé Leváre in the Bratislava Region Location of Malé Leváre in Slovakia
- Coordinates: 48.50°N 16.97°E
- Country: Slovakia
- Region: Bratislava Region
- District: Malacky District
- First mentioned: 1378

Area
  - Total: 21.75 km^{2} (8.40 sq mi)
- Elevation: 153 m (502 ft)

Population (2025)
  - Total: 1,875
- Time zone: UTC+1 (CET)
  - Summer (DST): UTC+2 (CEST)
- Postal code: 908 74
- Area code: +421 34
- Vehicle registration plate (until 2022): MA
- Website: www.malelevare.sk

Malé Leváre (Hungarian: Kislévárd) is a village and municipality in western Slovakia in Malacky District in the Bratislava region, near the border with Austria.

It was mentioned for the first time in deed from the year 1377, issued by the king Louis I. of Hungary. Village is dominated by renaissance, baroque rebuilt Roman Catholic church of Assumption of the Holy Virgin. In the area of the village there is also a baroque chapel, and bunkers, which were built as part of Czechoslovak border fortification in 1938. During the Cold War, the Iron Curtain was leading near the village and the border was guarded by soldiers.

== Geography ==
The municipality lies at an altitude of 153 metres (502 ft) and covers an area of 21.75 km^{2} (8.40 sq mi) (2025).

== Population ==
Population statistic (10 years)
| Year | 1995 | 2005 | 2015 | 2025 |
|---|---|---|---|---|
| Count | 979 | 1095 | 1189 | 1875 |
| Difference | | +11.84% | +8.58% | +57.69% |

Population statistic
| Year | 2024 | 2025 |
|---|---|---|
| Count | 1819 | 1875 |
| Difference | | +3.07% |

It has a population of 1875 people (31 December 2025).

=== Ethnicity ===
Census 2021 (1+ %)
| Ethnicity | Number | Fraction |
|---|---|---|
| Slovak | 1349 | 89.33% |
| Not found out | 146 | 9.66% |
| Czech | 22 | 1.45% |
| Romani | 19 | 1.25% |
| Total | 1510 | |

In year 2021 was 1510 people by ethnicity 1349 as Slovak, 146 as Not found out, 22 as Czech, 19 as Romani, 5 as Hungarian, 3 as German, 3 as Other, 2 as Rusyn, 2 as Moravian, 1 as Ukrainian, 1 as Austrian, 1 as Polish and 1 as Croatian.

Note on population: The difference values of population numbers in the table "Population statistic" and in the sections "Ethnicity" & "Religion" is caused by the use of various statistical methods.

=== Religion ===
Census 2021 (1+ %)
| Religion | Number | Fraction |
|---|---|---|
| Roman Catholic Church | 907 | 60.07% |
| None | 372 | 24.64% |
| Not found out | 170 | 11.26% |
| Evangelical Church | 18 | 1.19% |
| Total | 1510 | |

In year 2021 was 1510 people by religion 907 from Roman Catholic Church, 372 from None, 170 from Not found out, 18 from Evangelical Church, 14 from Christian Congregations in Slovakia, 7 from Other, 5 from Greek Catholic Church, 4 from Calvinist Church, 4 from Ad hoc movements, 3 from Eastern Orthodox Church, 1 from Paganism and natural spirituality, 1 from Jehovah's Witnesses, 1 from Islam, 1 from Hinduism, 1 from United Methodist Church and 1 from Buddhism.
