= Studienka =

Studienka Szentistvánkút
- Municipality
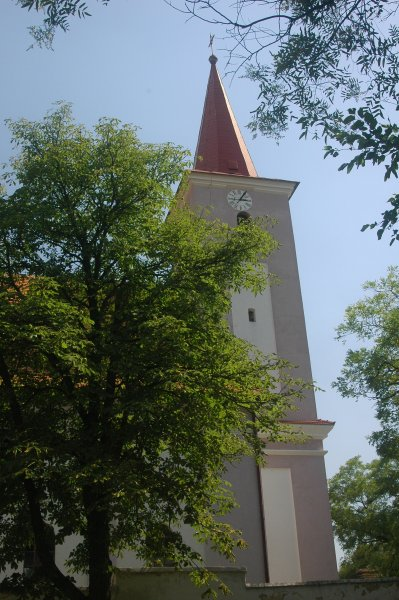
- Saint Stephen's Church

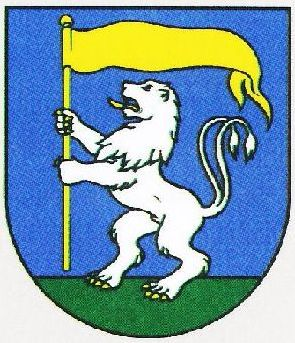
- Flag Coat of arms

- Location of Studienka in the Bratislava Region Location of Studienka in Slovakia
- Coordinates: 48.53°N 17.13°E
- Country: Slovakia
- Region: Bratislava Region
- District: Malacky District
- First mentioned: 1592

Area
  - Total: 15.63 km^{2} (6.03 sq mi)
- Elevation: 202 m (663 ft)

Population (2025)
  - Total: 1,754
- Time zone: UTC+1 (CET)
  - Summer (DST): UTC+2 (CEST)
- Postal code: 908 75
- Area code: +421 34
- Vehicle registration plate (until 2022): MA
- Website: www.obecstudienka.sk

Studienka (formerly Slovak: Hasprunka, German: Hausbrunn or Haubsrun, Hungarian: Szentistvánkút, also mentioned as Iwanusfalua, Istvánfalva, Haszprunka, Szentistván, Poszony-Szentistván) is a town and municipality in western Slovakia in Malacky District in the Bratislava region.

== History ==
=== First settlements ===
Recent discoveries indicate that the first settlements date back to the so-called La Tène culture, where the present territory was inhabited by Celtic tribes. They settled here probably as they were able to extract metals from the ores located in the northeast of today's village.

Evidence of Celtic settlement was first discovered in 1980 - 1983 by a Slovak archaeologist Dr. Lev Zachar, a member of the Archaeological Institute of the Slovak National Museum, in cooperation with the locals. During this period, 18 locations were discovered, hiding various iron and bronze clips, iron spikes and parts of ceramics, which are now part of the exhibition in the Slovak National Museum.

=== First written mention and resettlement ===
The first written mention until recently was thought to be the last part of the three-volume work of Cities and Communities of Slovakia from 1592, where the municipality is registered under its German name Hausbrun. It was previously believed that the town was founded by German-speaking settlers from Austria in the 15th century.

Today, however, experts turn to the 1392 documents of Sigismund of Luxembourg, in which the Polish Duke Stibor of Stiboricz was given the Royal Wywar Castle (Holíč), together with all the properties belonging to this castle. Studienka, listed in this charter as the village of Iwanusfalua, belonged to this catchment area as the southernmost village of Holice district.

In the 15th century, after the defeat of Kingdom of Hungary (1526–1867) to the Ottoman Empire in the Battle of Mohács in 1526, the area became part of the Habsburg monarchy. This marked the beginning of a new era for the area, as it received an influx of German-speaking population from Austria, resulting in its growth.

There are no reliable written references to the reason for the arrival of the German-speaking population, but two versions have been preserved by oral submission. According to one version, the Austrian lumberjacks were supposed to build their houses near a fountain, hence it was called in German Haus bei Brunn ("house by the fountain"), then Hausbrunn and later Slovak Hasprunka. The second version talks about a shepherd from Hausbrunn (Lower Austria), who was looking for pastures for his flock of sheep. After other shepherds settled in the village, the place was later Slovakized Hasprunka, named after the place of origin of the first shepherd.

In 1948, the place was renamed Studienka due to national political reasons (see Slovakization), following the Slovak word studna ("fountain").

=== World War I ===
On July 28, 1914, general mobilization was declared and all eligible men were sent to the eastern front. This resulted in only women, children and the elderly remaining in the village. A general chronicle of these years indicates a period of hunger and misery, and in 1915 even church bells were taken for the military purposes. The end of the war and the dissolution of Austria-Hungary in 1918 resulted in the outbreak of chaos in the village and subsequently looting, especially of wealthy Jewish population. The total number of victims of the war period is unknown, but 37 men were not returned from the front. The names of the fallen soldiers are engraved on the memorial to the victims of the First World War from 1919, which stands in the park at St Stephen's Church.

=== Jewish community in the village ===
By the late 19th and early 20th century, the Jewish community had a strong presence in town. Its members owned pubs, shops, a bakery and a meat shop. Many of them were important members of the general council and municipality. During this period a Synagogue, a Jewish School and a Jewish Cemetery were established. The unfavourable situation before the Second World War forced most of the Jewish population to leave the town. Others who stayed behind were deported to the concentration camps - the last Jewish citizen left the village in 1939. The Jewish Synagogue, is now used as a Municipal office, and the remains of the Jewish cemetery in the town quarter of Na Jame is preserved.

- Rabbi Max Reiser was born in 1839 in Studienka. He was the head Rabbi of Neuern from 1876 until his death on January 5, 1913.

== Geography ==
The municipality lies at an altitude of 202 metres (663 ft) and covers an area of 15.63 km^{2} (6.03 sq mi) (2025).

== Population ==
Population statistic (10 years)
Year	1995	2005	2015	2025
Count	1527	1628	1634	1754
Difference		+6.61%	+0.36%	+7.34%

Population statistic
Year	2024	2025
Count	1748	1754
Difference		+0.34%

It has a population of 1754 people (31 December 2025).

=== Ethnicity ===
Census 2021 (1+ %)
Ethnicity	Number	Fraction
Slovak	1627	96.55%
Not found out	47	2.78%
Total	1685	

In year 2021 was 1685 people by ethnicity 1627 as Slovak, 47 as Not found out, 11 as Czech, 5 as Romani, 4 as Hungarian, 2 as Ukrainian, 2 as Italian, 2 as Other, 1 as Irish, 1 as Rusyn, 1 as Russian, 1 as Austrian, 1 as German, 1 as Greek and 1 as Albanian.

Note on population: The difference values of population numbers in the table "Population statistic" and in the sections "Ethnicity" & "Religion" is caused by the use of various statistical methods.

=== Religion ===
Census 2021 (1+ %)
Religion	Number	Fraction
Roman Catholic Church	1230	73%
None	358	21.25%
Not found out	50	2.97%
Total	1685	

In year 2021 was 1685 people by religion 1230 from Roman Catholic Church, 358 from None, 50 from Not found out, 15 from Evangelical Church, 12 from Christian Congregations in Slovakia, 5 from Calvinist Church, 4 from Other, 3 from Greek Catholic Church, 3 from Ad hoc movements, 2 from Other and not ascertained christian church, 1 from Eastern Orthodox Church, 1 from Czechoslovak Hussite Church and 1 from Buddhism.

== Bibliography ==
- Zachar, Lev (1991). Keltské sídlisko pri obci Studienka, okr.Senica. Slovensko v dobe laténskej. Bratislava.
- Zachar, Lev (1987). Keltské umenie na Slovensku. Slovensko v dobe laténskej. Bratislava.
