= Láb =

- Municipality
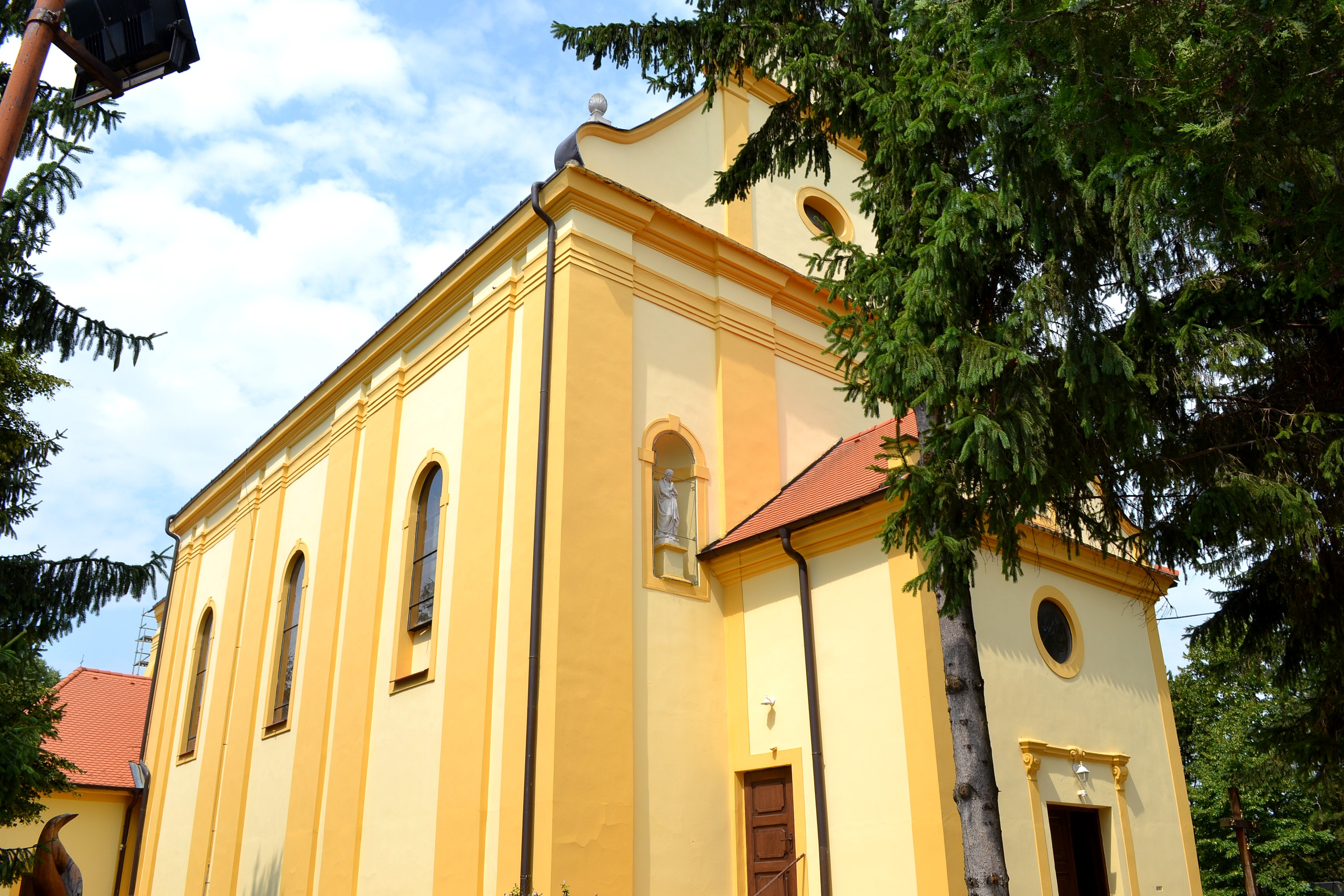
- Church of All Saints

- Flag

- Location of Láb in the Bratislava Region Location of Láb in Slovakia
- Coordinates: 48.36°N 16.97°E
- Country: Slovakia
- Region: Bratislava Region
- District: Malacky District
- First mentioned: 1206

Area
  - Total: 27.85 km^{2} (10.75 sq mi)
- Elevation: 155 m (509 ft)

Population (2025)
  - Total: 2,221
- Time zone: UTC+1 (CET)
  - Summer (DST): UTC+2 (CEST)
- Postal code: 900 67
- Area code: +421 34
- Vehicle registration plate (until 2022): MA
- Website: www.obeclab.sk

Láb is a village and municipality in western Slovakia in Malacky District in the Bratislava region.

== Geography ==
The municipality lies at an altitude of 155 metres (509 ft) and covers an area of 27.85 km^{2} (10.75 sq mi) (2025).

== Etymology ==
The name derives from Loyp (Leopold). Terra Loyp (1206), silva Loyp (1271), Laab (1400).

== Population ==
Population statistic (10 years)
| Year | 1995 | 2005 | 2015 | 2025 |
|---|---|---|---|---|
| Count | 1353 | 1390 | 1628 | 2221 |
| Difference | | +2.73% | +17.12% | +36.42% |

Population statistic
| Year | 2024 | 2025 |
|---|---|---|
| Count | 2207 | 2221 |
| Difference | | +0.63% |

It has a population of 2221 people (31 December 2025).

=== Ethnicity ===
Census 2021 (1+ %)
| Ethnicity | Number | Fraction |
|---|---|---|
| Slovak | 1965 | 95.94% |
| Not found out | 65 | 3.17% |
| Total | 2048 | |

In year 2021 was 2048 people by ethnicity 1965 as Slovak, 65 as Not found out, 13 as Other, 11 as Czech, 9 as Russian, 9 as Hungarian, 4 as Rusyn, 4 as German, 3 as Austrian, 3 as Bulgarian, 2 as Jewish, 2 as Ukrainian, 2 as Polish, 2 as Croatian, 1 as Romani, 1 as Moravian, 1 as Greek and 1 as English.

Note on population: The difference values of population numbers in the table "Population statistic" and in the sections "Ethnicity" & "Religion" is caused by the use of various statistical methods.

=== Religion ===
Census 2021 (1+ %)
| Religion | Number | Fraction |
|---|---|---|
| Roman Catholic Church | 1133 | 55.32% |
| None | 750 | 36.62% |
| Not found out | 65 | 3.17% |
| Evangelical Church | 31 | 1.51% |
| Total | 2048 | |

In year 2021 was 2048 people by religion 1133 from Roman Catholic Church, 750 from None, 65 from Not found out, 31 from Evangelical Church, 20 from Greek Catholic Church, 11 from Ad hoc movements, 8 from Eastern Orthodox Church, 7 from Other, 6 from Calvinist Church, 5 from Apostolic Church, 3 from Buddhism, 2 from Other and not ascertained christian church, 2 from Christian Congregations in Slovakia, 1 from Old Catholic Church, 1 from Paganism and natural spirituality, 1 from Jehovah's Witnesses, 1 from Islam and 1 from Hinduism.
