= Plavecký Mikuláš =

Plavecký Mikuláš Detrekőszentmiklós
- Municipality
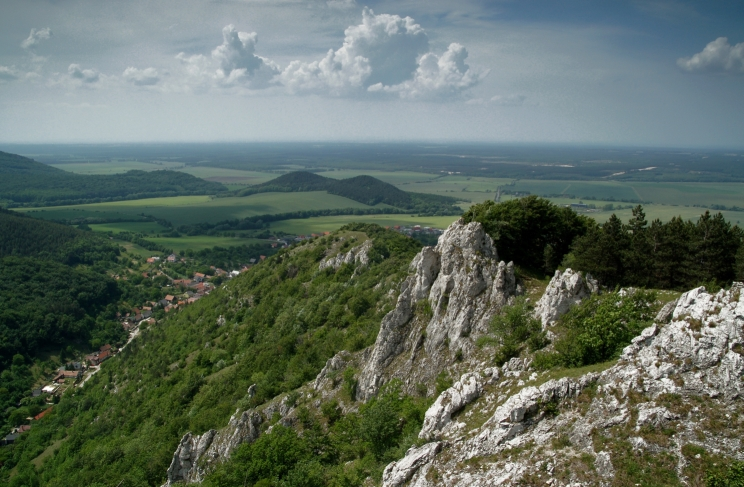

- Flag

- Location of Plavecký Mikuláš in the Bratislava Region Location of Plavecký Mikuláš in Slovakia
- Coordinates: 48.51°N 17.30°E
- Country: Slovakia
- Region: Bratislava Region
- District: Malacky District
- First mentioned: 1394

Government
  - Mayor: Emília Balúchová (Independent)

Area
  - Total: 26.68 km^{2} (10.30 sq mi)
- Elevation: 253 m (830 ft)

Population (2025)
  - Total: 741
- Time zone: UTC+1 (CET)
  - Summer (DST): UTC+2 (CEST)
- Postal code: 906 35
- Area code: +421 34
- Vehicle registration plate (until 2022): MA
- Website: www.plaveckymikulas.sk

Plavecký Mikuláš (Slovak: [ˈplaʋetskiː ˈmikulaːʂ]; German: Blasenstein-Sankt-Nikolaus; Hungarian: Detrekőszentmiklós) is a village and municipality in western Slovakia in Malacky District in the Bratislava region.

== Geography ==
The municipality lies at an altitude of 253 metres (830 ft) and covers an area of 26.68 km^{2} (10.30 sq mi) (2025).

== Population ==
Population statistic (10 years)
Year	1995	2005	2015	2025
Count	718	709	720	741
Difference		−1.25%	+1.55%	+2.91%

Population statistic
Year	2024	2025
Count	740	741
Difference		+0.13%

It has a population of 741 people (31 December 2025).

=== Ethnicity ===
Census 2021 (1+ %)
Ethnicity	Number	Fraction
Slovak	726	98.1%
Not found out	11	1.48%
Total	740	

In year 2021 was 740 people by ethnicity 726 as Slovak, 11 as Not found out, 5 as Czech, 2 as Ukrainian, 2 as Hungarian, 1 as Romanian, 1 as Austrian and 1 as Moravian.

Note on population: The difference values of population numbers in the table "Population statistic" and in the sections "Ethnicity" & "Religion" is caused by the use of various statistical methods.

=== Religion ===
Census 2021 (1+ %)
Religion	Number	Fraction
Roman Catholic Church	565	76.35%
None	138	18.65%
Not found out	11	1.49%
Total	740	

In year 2021 was 740 people by religion 565 from Roman Catholic Church, 138 from None, 11 from Not found out, 6 from Other, 6 from Evangelical Church, 4 from Islam, 4 from Greek Catholic Church, 2 from Ad hoc movements, 1 from Eastern Orthodox Church, 1 from Christian Congregations in Slovakia, 1 from Seventh-day Adventist Church and 1 from Apostolic Church.
