= Pernek =

- Municipality
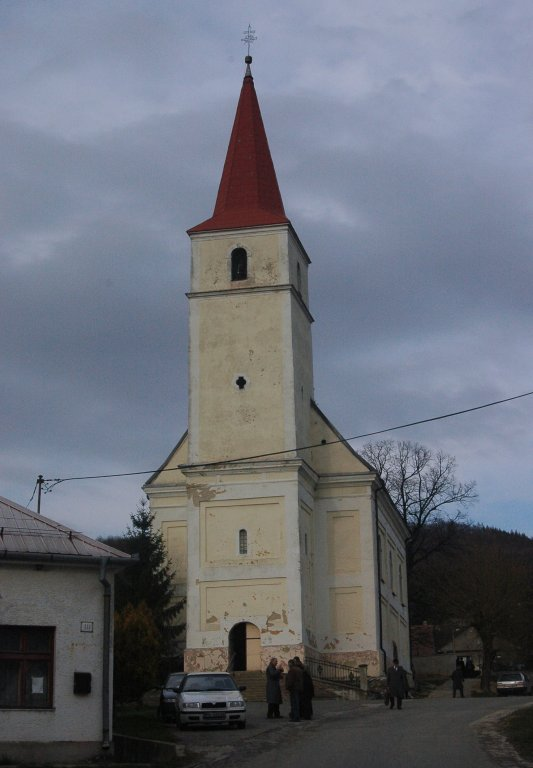
- Church of Saint Spirit

- Flag

- Location of Pernek in the Bratislava Region Location of Pernek in Slovakia
- Coordinates: 48.37°N 17.15°E
- Country: Slovakia
- Region: Bratislava Region
- District: Malacky District
- First mentioned: 1394

Area
  - Total: 27.66 km^{2} (10.68 sq mi)
- Elevation: 260 m (850 ft)

Population (2025)
  - Total: 894
- Time zone: UTC+1 (CET)
  - Summer (DST): UTC+2 (CEST)
- Postal code: 900 53
- Area code: +421 34
- Vehicle registration plate (until 2022): MA
- Website: www.pernek.sk

Pernek is a village and municipality in Malacky District in the Bratislava Region of western Slovakia.

== History ==
In historical records the village was first mentioned in 1394.

== Geography ==
The municipality lies at an altitude of 260 metres (850 ft) and covers an area of 27.66 km^{2} (10.68 sq mi) (2025).

== Population ==
Population statistic (10 years)
Year	1995	2005	2015	2025
Count	741	810	857	894
Difference		+9.31%	+5.80%	+4.31%

Population statistic
Year	2024	2025
Count	899	894
Difference		−0.55%

It has a population of 894 people (31 December 2025).

=== Ethnicity ===
Census 2021 (1+ %)
Ethnicity	Number	Fraction
Slovak	826	92.29%
Not found out	61	6.81%
Total	895	

In year 2021 was 895 people by ethnicity 826 as Slovak, 61 as Not found out, 6 as Hungarian, 5 as Czech, 5 as Other, 4 as French, 2 as German, 1 as Turkish, 1 as Russian and 1 as Polish.

Note on population: The difference values of population numbers in the table "Population statistic" and in the sections "Ethnicity" & "Religion" is caused by the use of various statistical methods.

=== Religion ===
Census 2021 (1+ %)
Religion	Number	Fraction
Roman Catholic Church	562	62.79%
None	221	24.69%
Not found out	70	7.82%
Evangelical Church	10	1.12%
Total	895	

In year 2021 was 895 people by religion 562 from Roman Catholic Church, 221 from None, 70 from Not found out, 10 from Evangelical Church, 7 from Christian Congregations in Slovakia, 6 from Jehovah's Witnesses, 4 from Other, 3 from Other and not ascertained christian church, 3 from Buddhism, 2 from Greek Catholic Church, 2 from Ad hoc movements, 1 from Calvinist Church, 1 from Eastern Orthodox Church, 1 from Paganism and natural spirituality, 1 from Hinduism and 1 from Baptists Church.
