= Suchohrad =

Suchohrad Dimvár
- Municipality
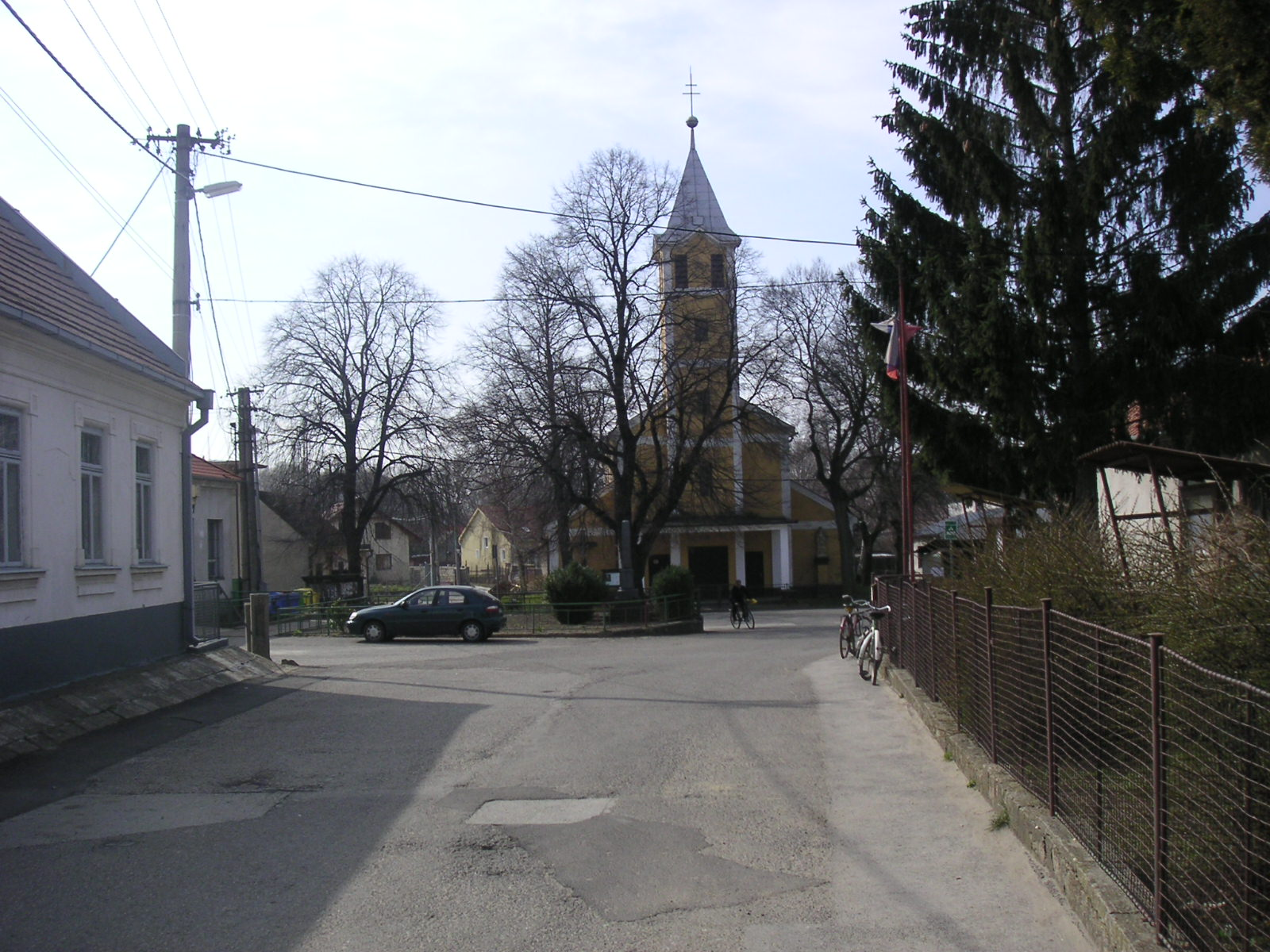

- Flag

- Location of Suchohrad in the Bratislava Region Location of Suchohrad in Slovakia
- Coordinates: 48.41°N 16.86°E
- Country: Slovakia
- Region: Bratislava Region
- District: Malacky District
- First mentioned: 1600

Area
  - Total: 15.40 km^{2} (5.95 sq mi)
- Elevation: 145 m (476 ft)

Population (2025)
  - Total: 682
- Time zone: UTC+1 (CET)
  - Summer (DST): UTC+2 (CEST)
- Postal code: 900 64
- Area code: +421 34
- Vehicle registration plate (until 2022): MA
- Website: www.suchohrad.sk

Suchograd (German: Dimburg; Hungarian: Dimvár) is a village and municipality in Malacky District in the Bratislava Region of western Slovakia close to the town of Malacky, north-west of Slovakia's capital Bratislava.

== Geography ==
The municipality lies at an altitude of 145 metres (476 ft) and covers an area of 15.40 km^{2} (5.95 sq mi) (2025).

== Population ==
Population statistic (10 years)
Year	1995	2005	2015	2025
Count	531	588	655	682
Difference		+10.73%	+11.39%	+4.12%

Population statistic
Year	2024	2025
Count	683	682
Difference		−0.14%

It has a population of 682 people (31 December 2025).

=== Ethnicity ===
Census 2021 (1+ %)
Ethnicity	Number	Fraction
Slovak	632	93.9%
Not found out	32	4.75%
Czech	8	1.18%
Total	673	

In year 2021 was 673 people by ethnicity 632 as Slovak, 32 as Not found out, 8 as Czech, 4 as Hungarian, 3 as Rusyn, 3 as French, 1 as Austrian and 1 as Other.

Note on population: The difference values of population numbers in the table "Population statistic" and in the sections "Ethnicity" & "Religion" is caused by the use of various statistical methods.

=== Religion ===
Census 2021 (1+ %)
Religion	Number	Fraction
None	336	49.93%
Roman Catholic Church	265	39.38%
Not found out	34	5.05%
Evangelical Church	12	1.78%
Greek Catholic Church	11	1.63%
Total	673	

In year 2021 was 673 people by religion 336 from None, 265 from Roman Catholic Church, 34 from Not found out, 12 from Evangelical Church, 11 from Greek Catholic Church, 4 from Calvinist Church, 4 from Christian Congregations in Slovakia, 2 from Paganism and natural spirituality, 2 from Baptists Church, 1 from Old Catholic Church, 1 from Hinduism and 1 from Ad hoc movements.
