= Záhorie =

Region in western Slovakia

Coordinates: 48°33′N 17°05′E

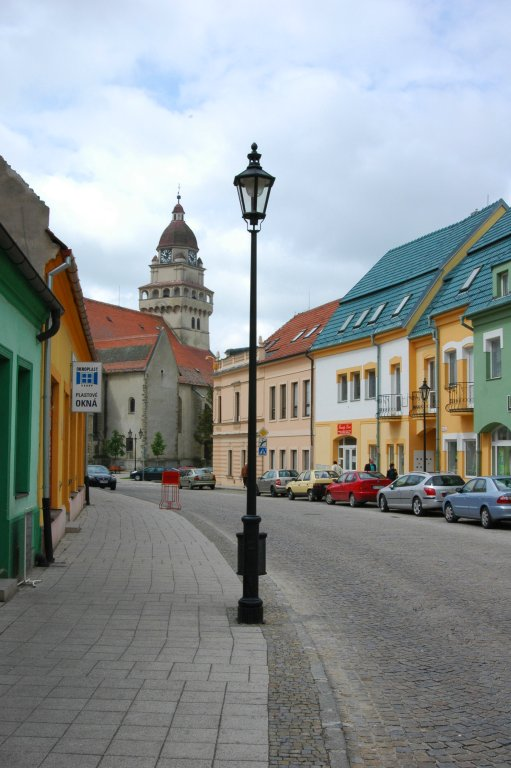
Skalica

Záhorie (Hungarian: Erdőhát) is a region in western Slovakia between the Little Carpathians to the east and the Morava River to the west. Although not an administrative region, it is one of the 21 official tourism regions in Slovakia. Záhorie lies in the area of three administrative regions: Bratislava Region (Malacky District plus Záhorská Bystrica in Bratislava), Trnava Region (Senica and Skalica districts) and Trenčín Region (southern part of Myjava District). The region also creates the borders between Slovakia, the Czech Republic and Austria.

A military district of the same name is located around Malacky.

== Name ==
The word Záhorie literally means '(land) behind the mountains', referring to the Little Carpathians, which separate Záhorie from the rest of Slovakia. The Hungarian name of Záhorie, Erdőhát, literally means '(land) behind the forest'.

== Geography ==
In the middle of the region is the Záhorie Lowland, a plain between the towns of Senica and Malacky. Most of the area is forested because its sandy subsoil is not suitable for farming. The forested area is used as a testing range for military vehicles, especially tanks and artillery. The testing range is called Záhorie Military Technical Testing Institute, and it contains the testing range, the Kuchyňa airbase and the village of Záhorie, which was built for workers at the testing range. Headquarters are located in the village of Záhorie and includes storage facilities and research facilities.

The western edge of the region is formed by the river Morava. The eastern border is the Carpathian mountain range. On the north is the Chvojnice Hills. The Myjava River flows through the region, and nearly every municipality has a dam or lake.

== Climate and agriculture ==
The region is a plain behind mountains, so the climate is much drier than that of the rest of Slovakia. The region is well known for its wide yellow fields of rapeseed and red wine. Other grown crops are maize, sunflowers and grain.

This region is well known for producing high quality wines, especially in the regions around the town Skalica. This town is well known for a typical cuveé - Skalicky Rubin (Skalica Ruby), a composition of three sorts of red wine - Noir de Franconie (subsort Lampart)+ Portugais Bleu + Saint Laurent (Skalicka Frankovka, Modry Portugal, Svätovavrinecké) and also a typical subsort of Noir de Franconie redwine - Lampart.

The region specific production of alcoholic beverages is typically known with wine brandy and various fruit spirits (pear, apple, plum...) with higher volume of alcohol, 40% and more, especially slivovica, a popular local speciality.

== Population ==
The population in the area is around 170,000. Towns in the region are Gbely, Holíč, Malacky, Senica, Skalica, Stupava and Šaštín-Stráže.

The people here were for many years in the past farmers, so there are no big towns, most of the people lived in small villages not far from each other. The average distances between the villages are less than 3 km. Between the villages are very often small settlements, especially around Myjava and Brezová pod Bradlom, called kopanice, osady or samoty.

Because the region is geographically separated from the rest of Slovakia, its inhabitants (sg. Záhorák, pl. Záhoráci) are culturally closer to the Moravians and speak a distinct dialect Slovak that forms dialect continuum with the Moravian dialects of Czech. They are a target of frequent region-specific jokes from the rest of Slovaks, in a similar way that e.g. the Irish are mocked by the British, and the people from Appenzell, Switzerland are laughed at by the rest of the Swiss.

== Environment and ecology ==
Some parts of Záhorie are protected by Záhorie Protected Landscape Area, the first lowland protected landscape area in Slovakia. The Landscape Area takes 275.22 km² (106.3 mi²) and is divided into two separate parts – north-eastern and western. The Little Carpathians Protected Landscape Area and Biele Karpaty Protected Landscape Area are partly situated in Záhorie.

The largest part of Záhorie is taken up by the Záhorie Lowland, which is divided into the Bor Lowland and the Chvojnica Hills. The Bor Lowland (slovak: Borská nížina) is named after a big artificial forest named Bor, which is an old Slavic word (still commonly used in Czech) meaning 'pine forest'. This forest was planted with Scots pine in the 18th century on the largest blown sands of Slovakia.

== Transportation ==
The importance of Záhorie for transportation purposes increased sharply after the creation of Czechoslovakia in 1918, owing to the need to connect the two most important cities of the newly formed country, i.e. Prague and Bratislava, with a road and a railway that do not cross into any other country. Before that time, a typical horse carriage journey from Prague to Bratislava would pass through Znojmo and Vienna.

As a result, the main railway track passing through Záhorie (which was originally built in the late 19th century to connect Bratislava with Skalica) was doubled in 1920 and the track layout at the station of Kúty was modified so that the direct track from Bratislava now leads over the Morava river to Břeclav. The connection with the Emperor Ferdinand Northern Railway in Břeclav was rebuilt in 1929 too, so that direct trains between Prague and Bratislava no longer had to reverse direction in Břeclav.

The construction of the D2 motorway passing through Záhorie and connecting Bratislava with Brno and further with Prague was commenced in 1969 and completed in 1980.

Nowadays Záhorie provides the fastest route between Prague and Budapest for both road and rail traffic.

== Gallery ==
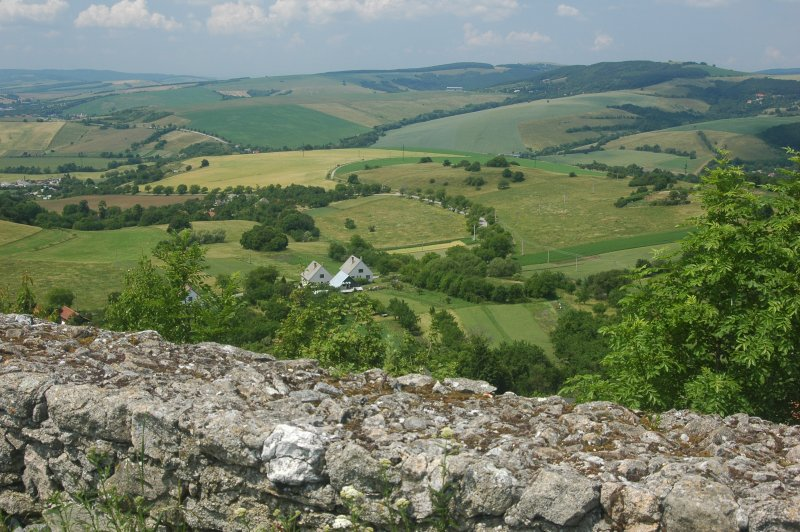
Senica Hills

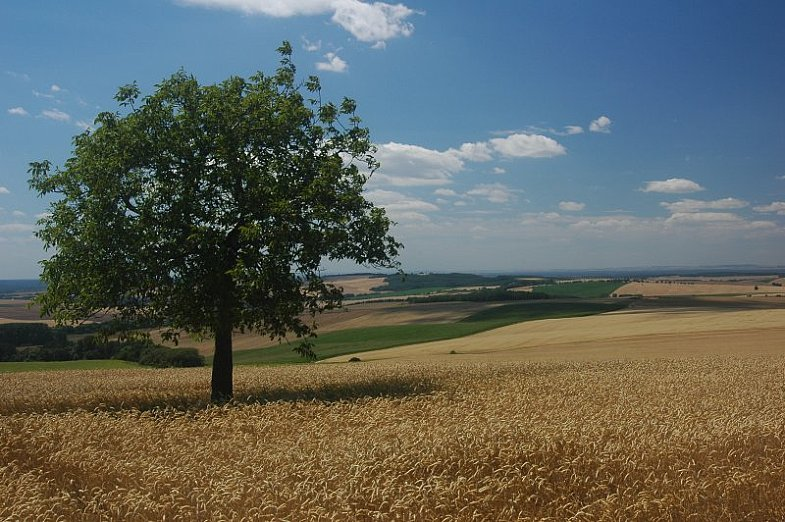
Chvojnice Hills

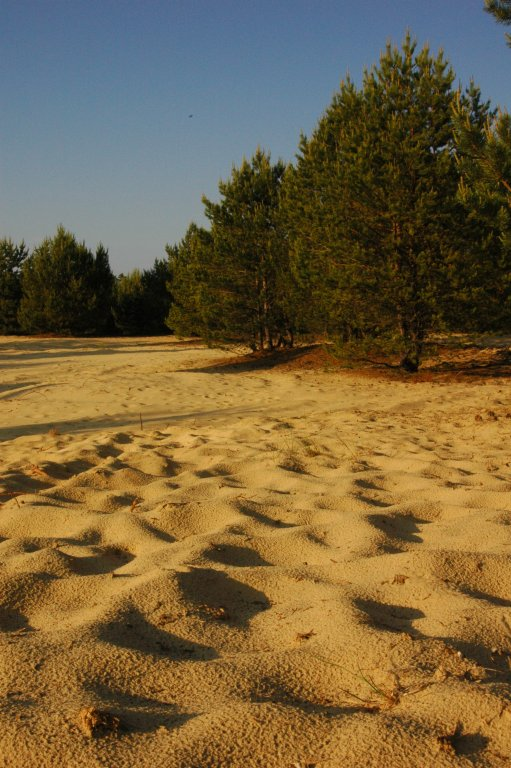
Dunes

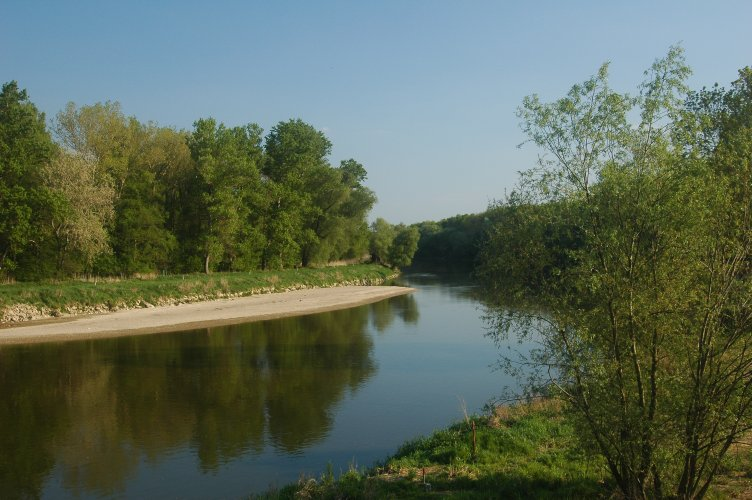
Morava River

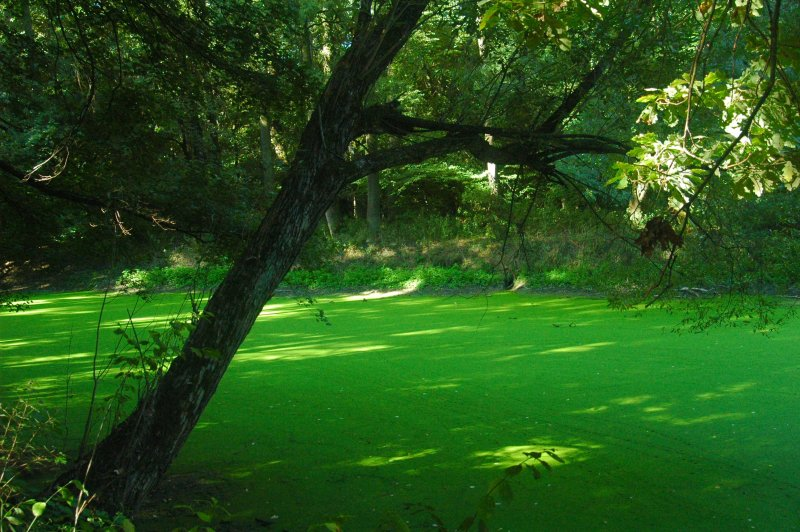
Morava oxbow

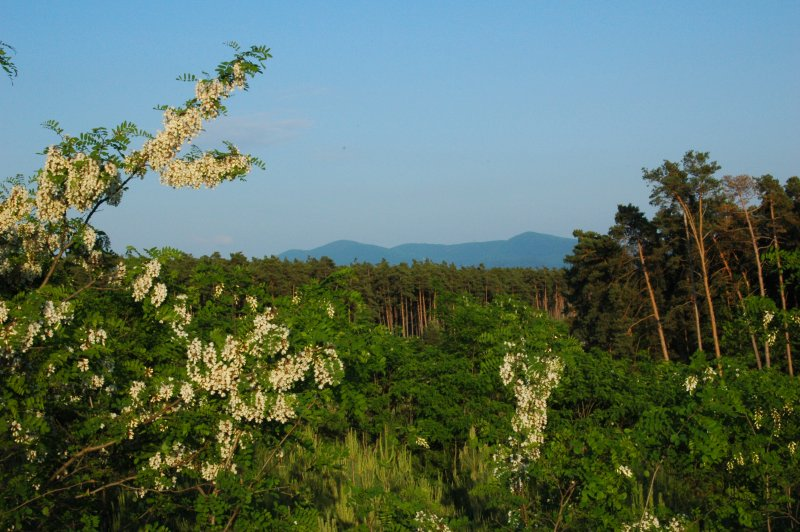
Bor Lowland, pine wood

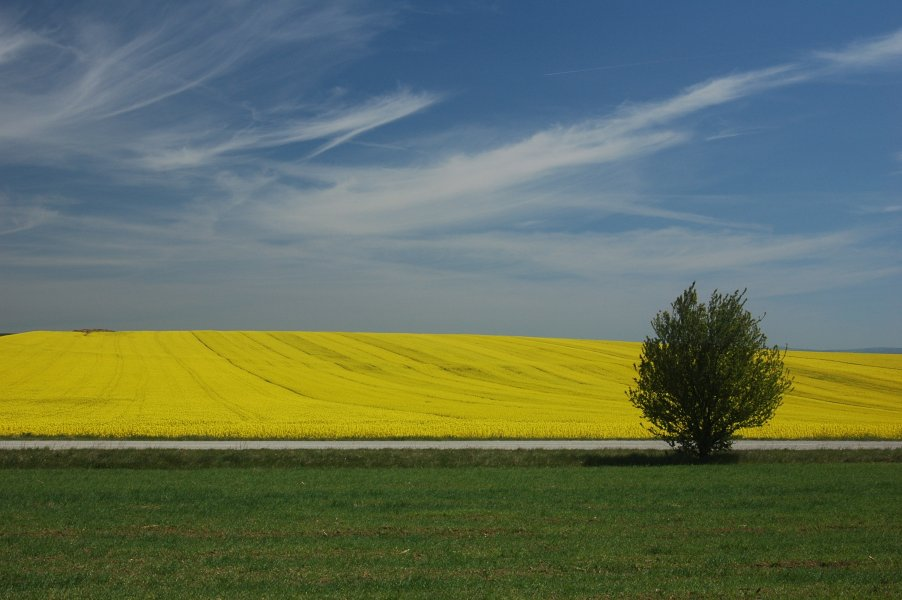
Fields near Unín

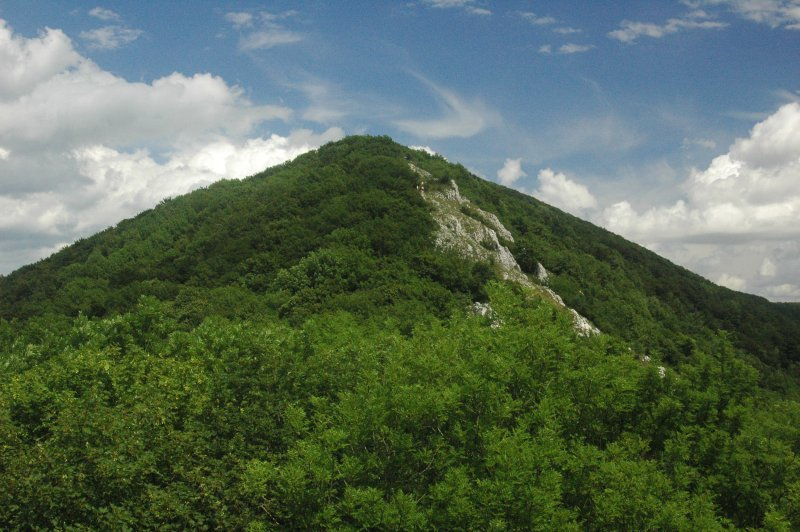
Mount Záruby

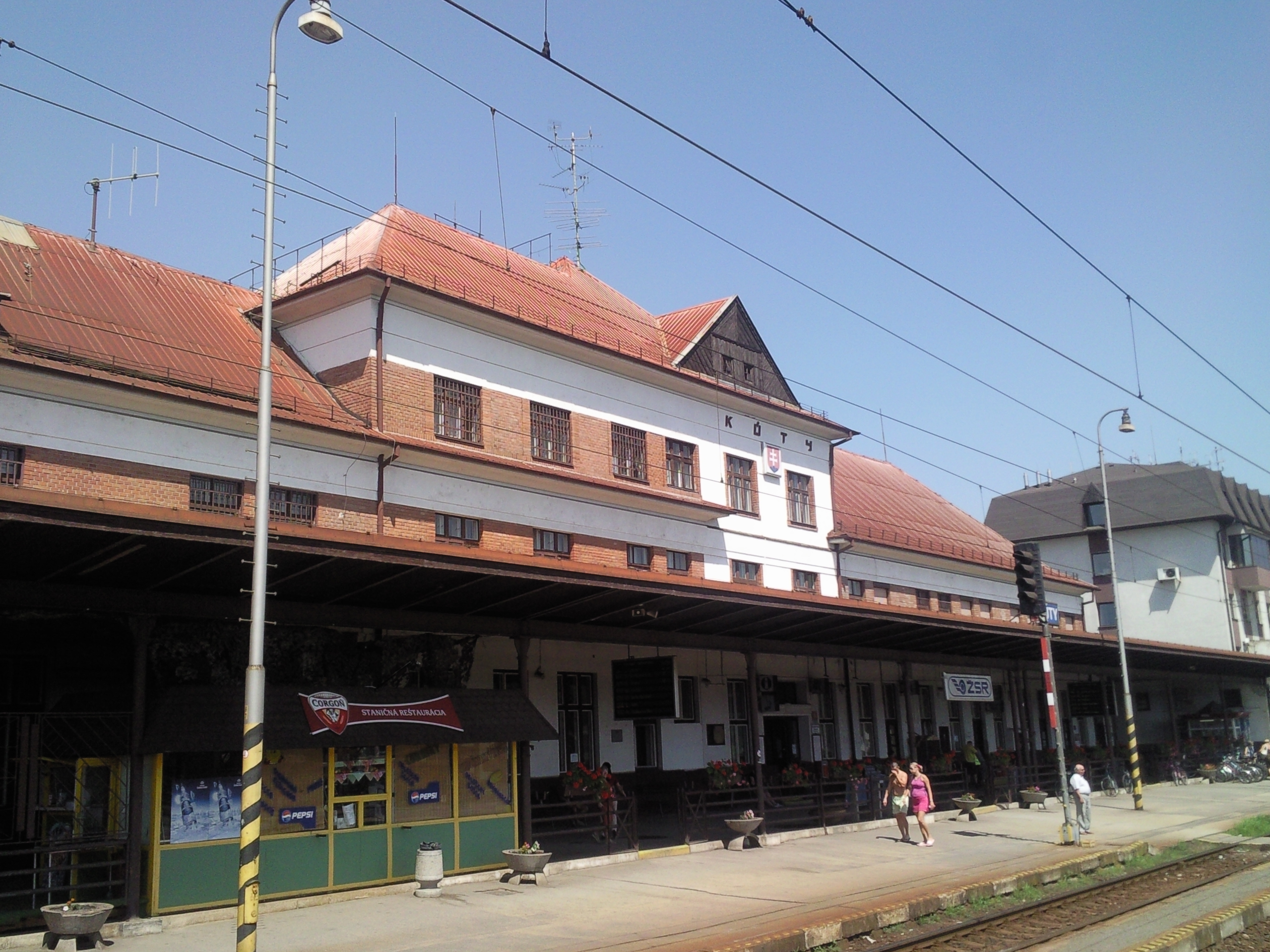
Railway station Kúty with an EC train

== See also ==
- Zagore (region) (also Zagorie), a region in medieval Bulgaria
