= Lozorno =

- Municipality
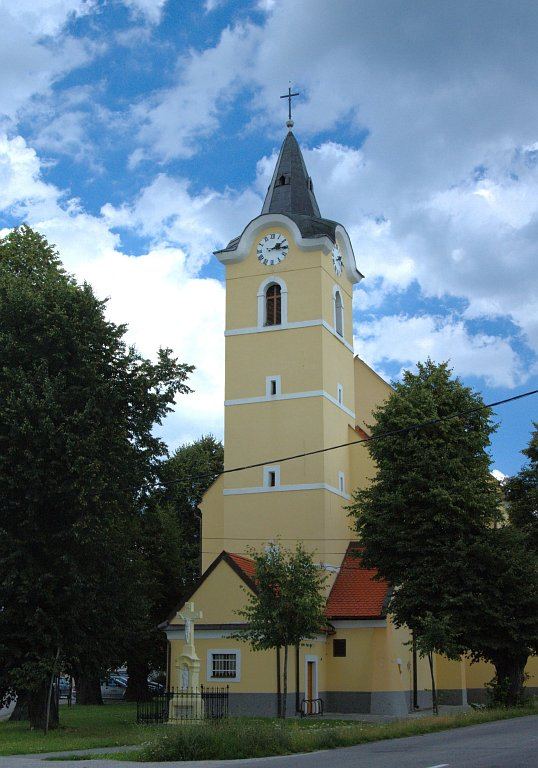
- Church in Lozorno

- Flag Coat of arms

- Location of Lozorno in the Bratislava Region Location of Lozorno in Slovakia
- Coordinates: 48.33°N 17.04°E
- Country: Slovakia
- Region: Bratislava Region
- District: Malacky District
- First mentioned: 1589

Government
  - Mayor: Luboš Tvrdoň

Area
  - Total: 44.31 km^{2} (17.11 sq mi)
- Elevation: 188 m (617 ft)

Population (2025)
  - Total: 3,165
- Time zone: UTC+1 (CET)
  - Summer (DST): UTC+2 (CEST)
- Postal code: 900 55
- Area code: +421 2
- Vehicle registration plate (until 2022): MA
- Website: www.lozorno.sk

Lozorno (Hungarian: Lozornó) is a village and municipality in western Slovakia in Malacky District in the Bratislava region. Lozorno lies near the western slopes of the Small Carpathians in the southern Záhorská lowlands. In the center of the village is the Church of St. Catherine of Alexandria, which dates from 1629. The village is also home to old monument statues of St. Florian and St. John of Nepomuk.

Above the village there is a lake which emerges from a "Dry Creek" through the village. Every year Lozorno residents or neighbors from surrounding villages gather to engage in fishing pursuits. Above this water reservoir is a trail that leads through the Little Carpathians in Košariská, which belongs to the municipality.

Lozorno has several restaurants and pubs as well as a three-star hotel that provides accommodation and restaurant services.

== Geography ==
The municipality lies at an altitude of 188 metres (617 ft) and covers an area of 44.31 km^{2} (17.11 sq mi) (2025).

== Population ==
Population statistic (10 years)
Year	1995	2005	2015	2025
Count	2548	2828	2965	3165
Difference		+10.98%	+4.84%	+6.74%

Population statistic
Year	2024	2025
Count	3158	3165
Difference		+0.22%

It has a population of 3165 people (31 December 2025).

=== Ethnicity ===
Census 2021 (1+ %)
Ethnicity	Number	Fraction
Slovak	2933	93.34%
Not found out	170	5.41%
Romani	85	2.7%
Czech	39	1.24%
Total	3142	

In year 2021 was 3142 people by ethnicity 2933 as Slovak, 170 as Not found out, 85 as Romani, 39 as Czech, 15 as Hungarian, 11 as Other, 7 as Ukrainian, 6 as Russian, 5 as German, 4 as Rusyn, 3 as Bulgarian, 2 as Romanian, 2 as Croatian, 1 as Jewish, 1 as Italian, 1 as Austrian, 1 as Moravian and 1 as French.

Note on population: The difference values of population numbers in the table "Population statistic" and in the sections "Ethnicity" & "Religion" is caused by the use of various statistical methods.

=== Religion ===
Census 2021 (1+ %)
Religion	Number	Fraction
Roman Catholic Church	1855	59.04%
None	947	30.14%
Not found out	192	6.11%
Evangelical Church	41	1.3%
Total	3142	

In year 2021 was 3142 people by religion 1855 from Roman Catholic Church, 947 from None, 192 from Not found out, 41 from Evangelical Church, 23 from Greek Catholic Church, 15 from Ad hoc movements, 13 from Old Catholic Church, 9 from Calvinist Church, 9 from Christian Congregations in Slovakia, 8 from Eastern Orthodox Church, 6 from Other and not ascertained christian church, 6 from Other, 4 from Jehovah's Witnesses, 4 from Church of the Brethren, 4 from Buddhism, 2 from Paganism and natural spirituality, 1 from Islam, 1 from Hinduism, 1 from Bahá'i Community and 1 from Apostolic Church.

== Sport in Lozorno ==
Lozorno has a golf course, sometimes used by citizens of Bratislava, as well as tennis courts. Football in Lozorno is represented by ŠK Lozorno football club, based at the local football stadium with a capacity of 850 people. The team plays in the western division of the 3rd Slovak Football league. The club has prep, junior and men squads. Lozorno is also known for the local hockey team Lozorski Orli (Lozorno Eagles), playing in Bratislava's local hockey ball league. The hockey ball stadium has a capacity of 150 and is located in the football stadium complex.

There is also a shooting range in Lozorno, mostly used by shooting clubs and individuals for sport shooting, but also for entertainment shooting and even as a training centre for police forces.

== Notable people ==
- Anton Tkáč, track cyclist
- Tomáš Zeman, football player
- Bruno Sirota, football player
- Samuel Foltyn, football player
- Slavko Kováč, football player
- Peťo Báli, tourist
