= Malacky District =

Coordinates: 48°26′11″N 17°01′06″E

- District
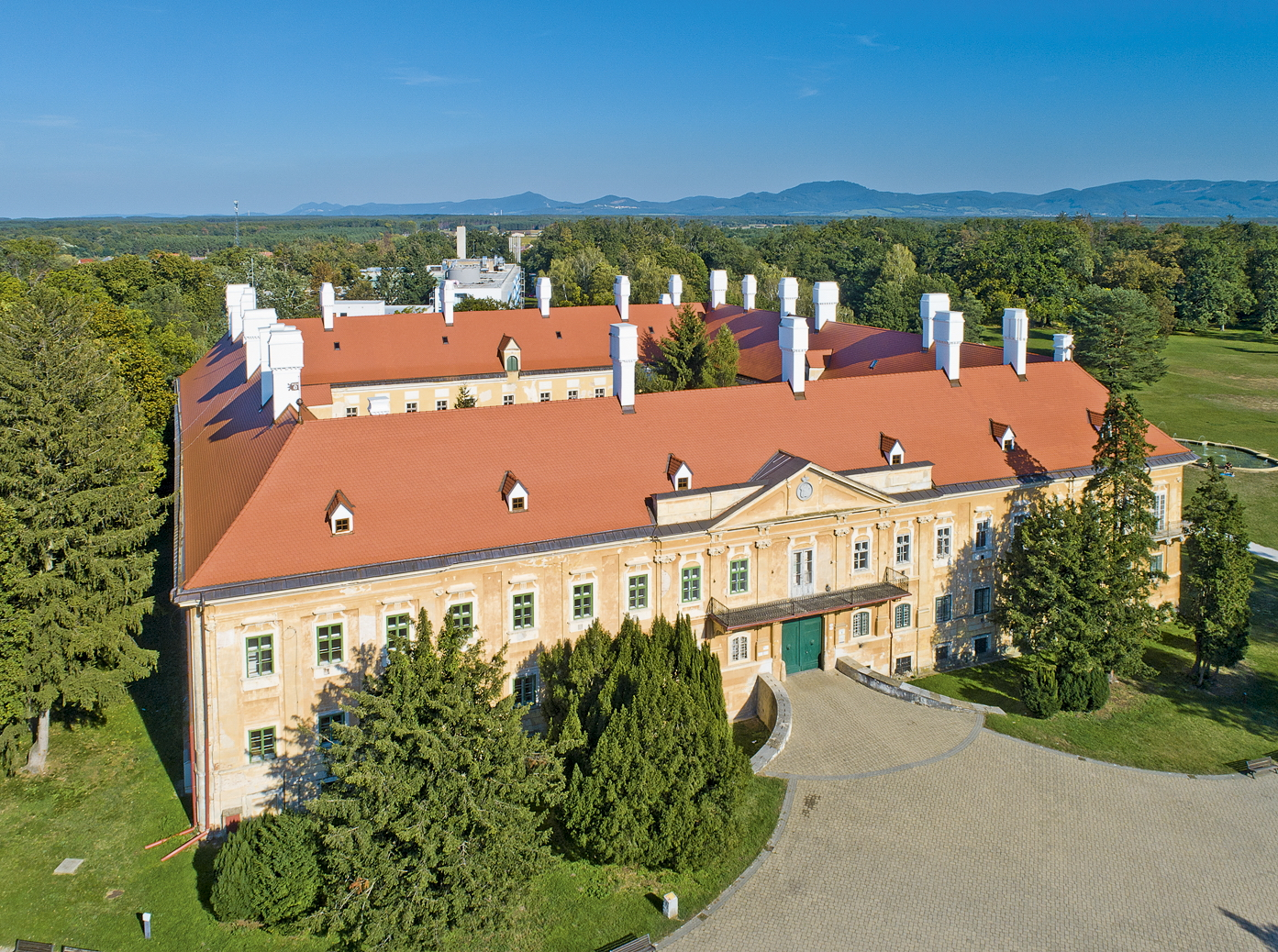
- Country: Slovakia
- Region (kraj): Bratislava Region
- Seat: Malacky

Area
  - Total: 949.51 km^{2} (366.61 sq mi)

Population (2025)
  - Total: 80,324
- Time zone: UTC+1 (CET)
  - Summer (DST): UTC+2 (CEST)
- Telephone prefix: 034
- Vehicle registration plate (until 2022): MA
- Municipalities: 26

The Malacky District (Slovak: okres Malacky) is a district in the Bratislava Region of western Slovakia. It lies north from Bratislava on Záhorská nížina lowland. Its current borders were established in 1996. The administrative seat is its largest town, Malacky. In the Malacky District the industrial park Eurovalley is located, on area of 1,500 hectares (3,700 acres) with several thousand employees. Second largest town is Stupava, which is located close to Bratislava.

== Population ==
Historical population
Year	Pop.	±%
1970	59,101	—
1980	63,086	+6.7%
1991	62,205	−1.4%
2001	64,354	+3.5%
2011	67,376	+4.7%
2021	78,136	+16.0%
Source: Censuses

Population statistic (10 years)
Year	1995	2005	2015	2025
Count	62,737	66,353	70,964	80,324
Difference		+5.76%	+6.94%	+13.18%

Population statistic
Year	2024	2025
Count	79,982	80,324
Difference		+0.42%

It has a population of 80,324 people (31 December 2025).

=== Ethnicity ===
Census 2021 (1+ %)
Ethnicity	Number	Fraction
Slovak	71,636	89.26%
Not found out	5322	6.63%
Czech	913	1.13%
Total	80,250	

In year 2021 was 80,250 people by ethnicity 71,636 as Slovak, 5322 as Not found out, 913 as Czech, 534 as Romani, 411 as Hungarian, 335 as Other, 157 as Rusyn, 123 as Ukrainian, 111 as Russian, 110 as German, 103 as Romanian, 80 as Serbian, 67 as Polish, 60 as Vietnamese, 40 as Austrian, 39 as Croatian, 32 as Italian, 31 as Moravian, 27 as Albanian, 21 as French, 21 as English, 20 as Bulgarian, 15 as Chinese, 9 as Jewish, 8 as Turkish, 6 as Canadian, 6 as Iranian, 5 as Irish, 4 as Greek, 2 as Silesian and 2 as Korean.

Note on population: The difference values of population numbers in the table "Population statistic" and in the sections "Ethnicity" & "Religion" is caused by the use of various statistical methods.

=== Religion ===
Census 2021 (1+ %)
Religion	Number	Fraction
Roman Catholic Church	43,972	56.28%
None	24,718	31.63%
Not found out	5434	6.95%
Evangelical Church	1371	1.75%
Total	78,136	

In year 2021 was 78,136 people by religion 43,972 from Roman Catholic Church, 24,718 from None, 5434 from Not found out, 1371 from Evangelical Church, 627 from Greek Catholic Church, 340 from Christian Congregations in Slovakia, 272 from Ad hoc movements, 249 from Eastern Orthodox Church, 244 from Other, 177 from Calvinist Church, 123 from Jehovah's Witnesses, 113 from Buddhism, 100 from Other and not ascertained christian church, 71 from Paganism and natural spirituality, 64 from Islam, 44 from Church of the Brethren, 35 from Old Catholic Church, 33 from Baptists Church, 32 from Apostolic Church, 28 from United Methodist Church, 24 from Bahá'i Community, 19 from Hinduism, 16 from Jewish community, 12 from Czechoslovak Hussite Church, 7 from Seventh-day Adventist Church, 7 from Church of Jesus Christ of Latter-day Saints and 4 from New Apostolic Church.

== Municipalities ==
Municipality	Area [km^{2}]	Population
Borinka	15.80	944
Gajary	50.87	3,221
Jablonové	13.22	1,457
Jakubov, Slovakia	20.85	1,867
Kostolište	16.82	2,379
Kuchyňa	44.72	1,793
Láb	27.85	2,221
Lozorno	44.31	3,165
Malacky	23.20	18,742
Malé Leváre	21.75	1,875
Marianka	3.22	2,362
Pernek	27.66	894
Plavecké Podhradie	21.18	735
Plavecký Mikuláš	26.68	741
Plavecký Štvrtok	22.45	2,598
Rohožník	27.47	3,516
Sološnica	37.74	1,658
Studienka	15.63	1,754
Stupava	67.17	12,979
Suchohrad	15.40	682
Veľké Leváre	23.99	3,767
Vysoká pri Morave	33.57	2,212
Záhorie (military district)	286.34	117
Záhorská Ves	13.05	1,868
Závod	27.37	2,931
Zohor	21.12	3,846

Population and area values are current for year 2025.
