= Jablonové, Malacky District =

Jablonové Apfelsbach
- Municipality
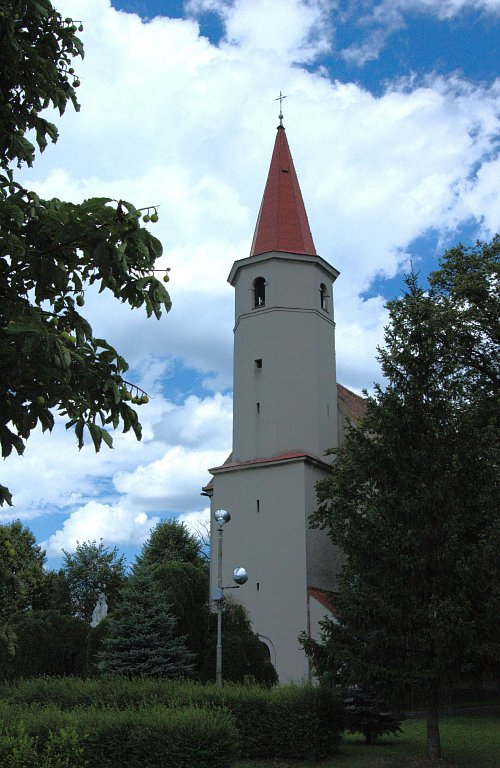
- St. Michael's Church

- Flag

- Location of Jablonové in the Bratislava Region Location of Jablonové in Slovakia
- Coordinates: 48.35°N 17.10°E
- Country: Slovakia
- Region: Bratislava Region
- District: Malacky District
- First mentioned: 1206

Area
  - Total: 13.22 km^{2} (5.10 sq mi)
- Elevation: 230 m (750 ft)

Population (2025)
  - Total: 1,457
- Time zone: UTC+1 (CET)
  - Summer (DST): UTC+2 (CEST)
- Postal code: 900 54
- Area code: +421 34
- Vehicle registration plate (until 2022): MA
- Website: www.obecjablonove.sk

Jablonové (German: Apfelsbach) is a village in Malacky District in the Bratislava Region of western Slovakia close to the town of Malacky, northwest of Slovakia's capital Bratislava.

== Geography ==
The municipality lies at an altitude of 230 metres (750 ft) and covers an area of 13.22 km^{2} (5.10 sq mi) (2025).

== Population ==
Population statistic (10 years)
| Year | 1995 | 2005 | 2015 | 2025 |
|---|---|---|---|---|
| Count | 1030 | 1077 | 1256 | 1457 |
| Difference | | +4.56% | +16.62% | +16.00% |

Population statistic
| Year | 2024 | 2025 |
|---|---|---|
| Count | 1429 | 1457 |
| Difference | | +1.95% |

It has a population of 1457 people (31 December 2025).

=== Ethnicity ===
Census 2021 (1+ %)
| Ethnicity | Number | Fraction |
|---|---|---|
| Slovak | 1317 | 95.09% |
| Not found out | 32 | 2.31% |
| Romani | 22 | 1.58% |
| Czech | 16 | 1.15% |
| Total | 1385 | |

In year 2021 was 1385 people by ethnicity 1317 as Slovak, 32 as Not found out, 22 as Romani, 16 as Czech, 9 as Other, 5 as Hungarian, 4 as Rusyn, 3 as Polish, 3 as English, 2 as Serbian, 2 as Croatian and 1 as German.

Note on population: The difference values of population numbers in the table "Population statistic" and in the sections "Ethnicity" & "Religion" is caused by the use of various statistical methods.

=== Religion ===
Census 2021 (1+ %)
| Religion | Number | Fraction |
|---|---|---|
| Roman Catholic Church | 850 | 61.37% |
| None | 404 | 29.17% |
| Not found out | 35 | 2.53% |
| Evangelical Church | 27 | 1.95% |
| Greek Catholic Church | 19 | 1.37% |
| Total | 1385 | |

In year 2021 was 1385 people by religion 850 from Roman Catholic Church, 404 from None, 35 from Not found out, 27 from Evangelical Church, 19 from Greek Catholic Church, 11 from Other, 10 from Jehovah's Witnesses, 6 from Eastern Orthodox Church, 6 from Christian Congregations in Slovakia, 5 from Church of the Brethren, 4 from Ad hoc movements, 3 from Calvinist Church, 3 from Buddhism, 1 from United Methodist Church and 1 from Apostolic Church.

== Genealogical resources ==
The records for genealogical research are available at the state archive "Statny Archiv in Bratislava, Slovakia"

- Roman Catholic church records (births/marriages/deaths): 1652-1896 (parish A)

== See also ==
- List of municipalities and towns in Slovakia
