= Jakubov, Slovakia =

Jakubov Jakobsdorf
- Municipality
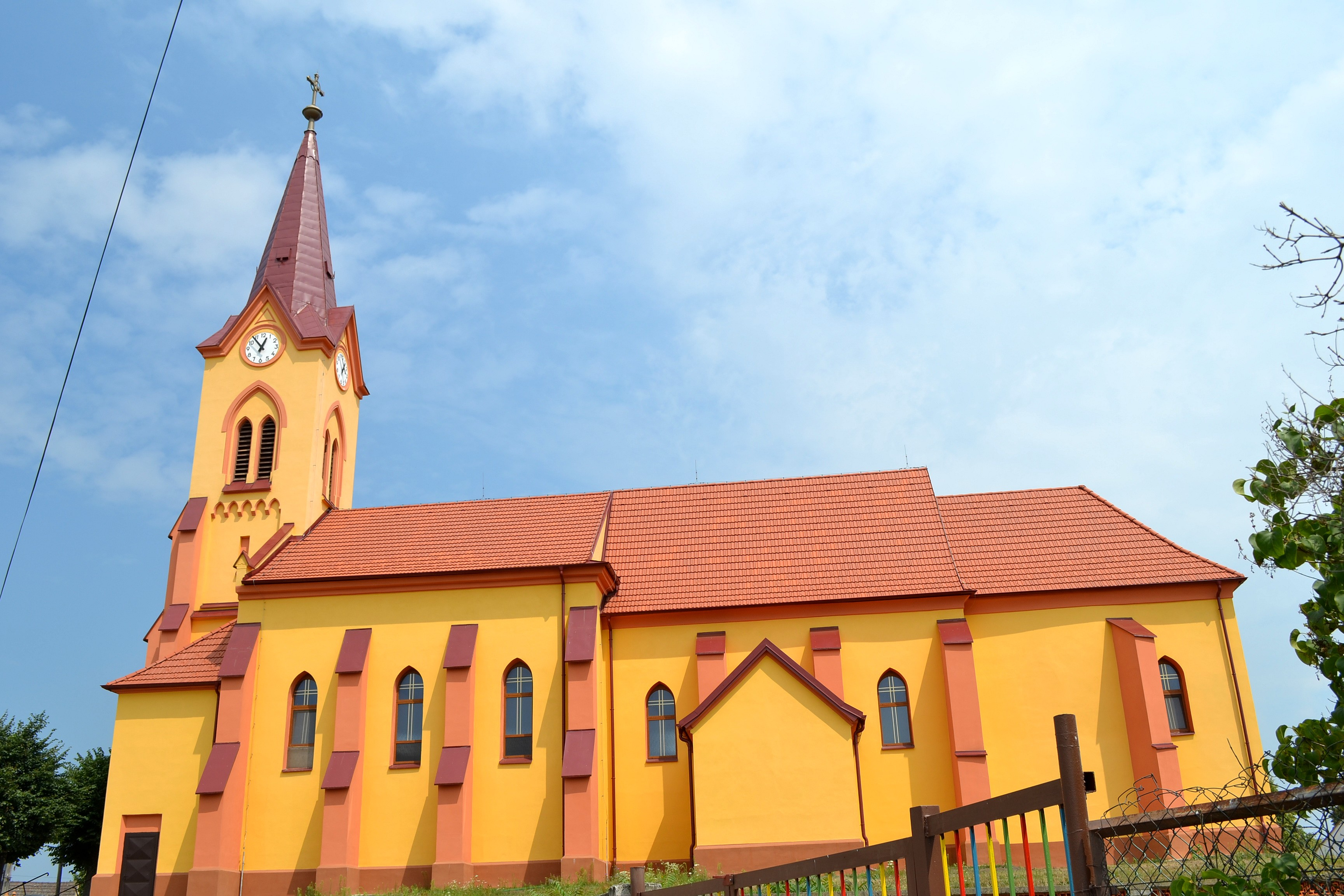
- Church in Jakubov

- Flag Coat of arms

- Location of Jakubov in the Bratislava Region Location of Jakubov in Slovakia
- Coordinates: 48.41°N 16.93°E
- Country: Slovakia
- Region: Bratislava Region
- District: Malacky District
- First mentioned: 1460

Area
  - Total: 20.85 km^{2} (8.05 sq mi)
- Elevation: 150 m (490 ft)

Population (2025)
  - Total: 1,867
- Time zone: UTC+1 (CET)
  - Summer (DST): UTC+2 (CEST)
- Postal code: 900 63
- Area code: +421 34
- Vehicle registration plate (until 2022): MA
- Website: www.jakubov.sk

Jakubov (German: Jakobsdorf, Hungarian: Nagyjakabfalva) is a village in Malacky District in the Bratislava Region of western Slovakia close to the town of Malacky, north-west of Slovakia's capital Bratislava.

== Geography ==
The municipality lies at an altitude of 150 metres (490 ft) and covers an area of 20.85 km^{2} (8.05 sq mi) (2025).

== Population ==
Population statistic (10 years)
Year	1995	2005	2015	2025
Count	1299	1393	1578	1867
Difference		+7.23%	+13.28%	+18.31%

Population statistic
Year	2024	2025
Count	1815	1867
Difference		+2.86%

It has a population of 1867 people (31 December 2025).

=== Ethnicity ===
Census 2021 (1+ %)
Ethnicity	Number	Fraction
Slovak	1634	94.12%
Not found out	74	4.26%
Czech	19	1.09%
Total	1736	

In year 2021 was 1736 people by ethnicity 1634 as Slovak, 74 as Not found out, 19 as Czech, 8 as Hungarian, 5 as Ukrainian, 3 as Romani, 3 as Austrian, 3 as German, 3 as Other, 1 as Jewish, 1 as Italian, 1 as Serbian, 1 as Rusyn, 1 as Russian, 1 as Romanian, 1 as Moravian, 1 as Croatian and 1 as Bulgarian.

Note on population: The difference values of population numbers in the table "Population statistic" and in the sections "Ethnicity" & "Religion" is caused by the use of various statistical methods.

=== Religion ===
Census 2021 (1+ %)
Religion	Number	Fraction
Roman Catholic Church	1161	66.88%
None	407	23.44%
Not found out	119	6.85%
Total	1736	

In year 2021 was 1736 people by religion 1161 from Roman Catholic Church, 407 from None, 119 from Not found out, 15 from Evangelical Church, 9 from Other and not ascertained christian church, 7 from Greek Catholic Church, 4 from Calvinist Church, 4 from Christian Congregations in Slovakia, 4 from Ad hoc movements, 3 from Other, 2 from Eastern Orthodox Church and 1 from Paganism and natural spirituality.

== Genealogical resources ==
The records for genealogical research are available at the state archive "Statny Archiv in Bratislava, Slovakia"

- Roman Catholic church records (births/marriages/deaths): 1672-1895 (parish A)

== See also ==
- List of municipalities and towns in Slovakia
