= Záhorie (military district) =

Coordinates: 48°40′N 17°25′E

- Interactive map of Záhorie
- Country: Slovakia

Area
  - Total: 286.34 km^{2} (110.56 sq mi)

Population (2025)
  - Total: 117
- Time zone: UTC+1 (CET)
  - Summer (DST): UTC+2 (CEST)

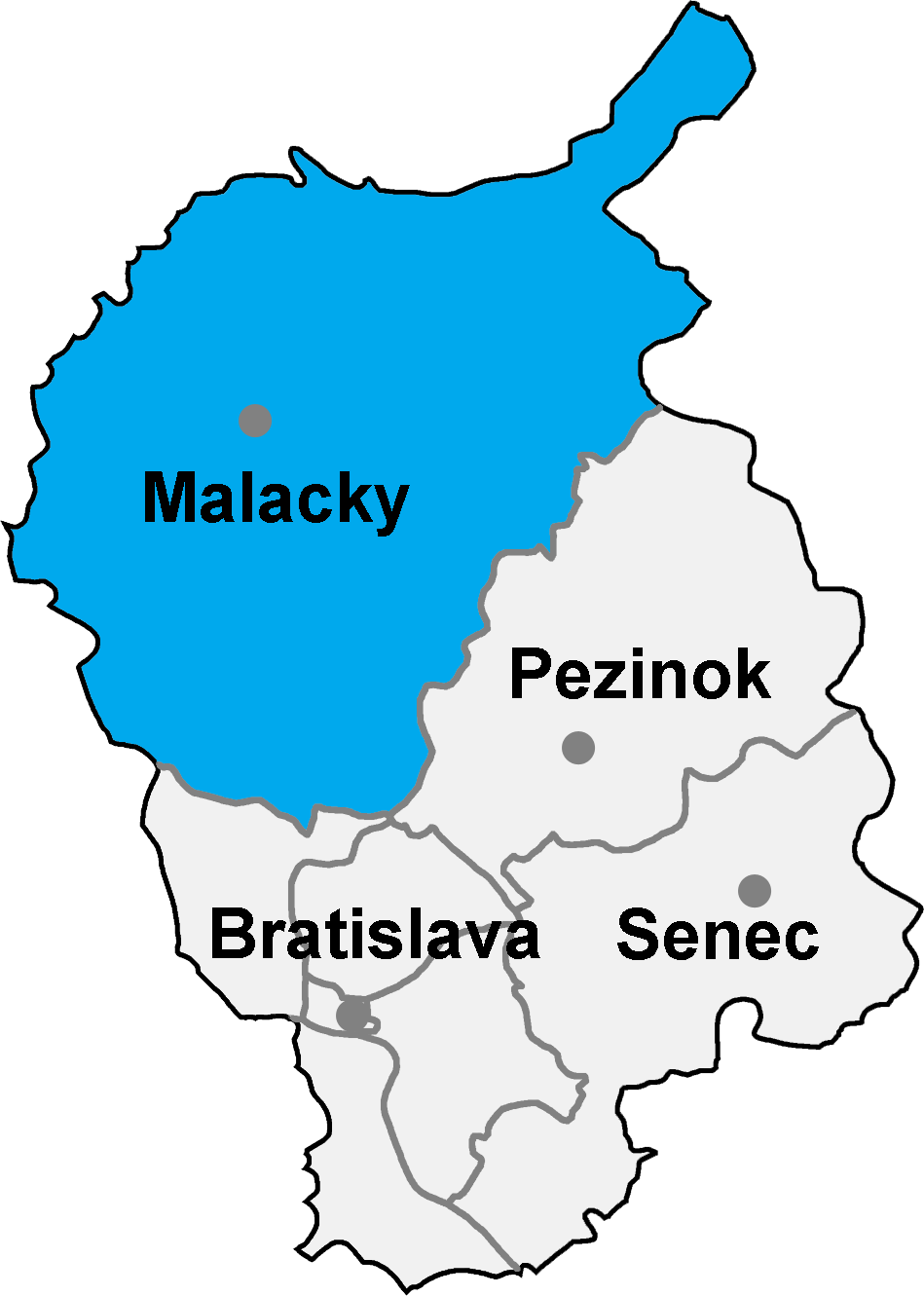
Malacky District in the Bratislava region

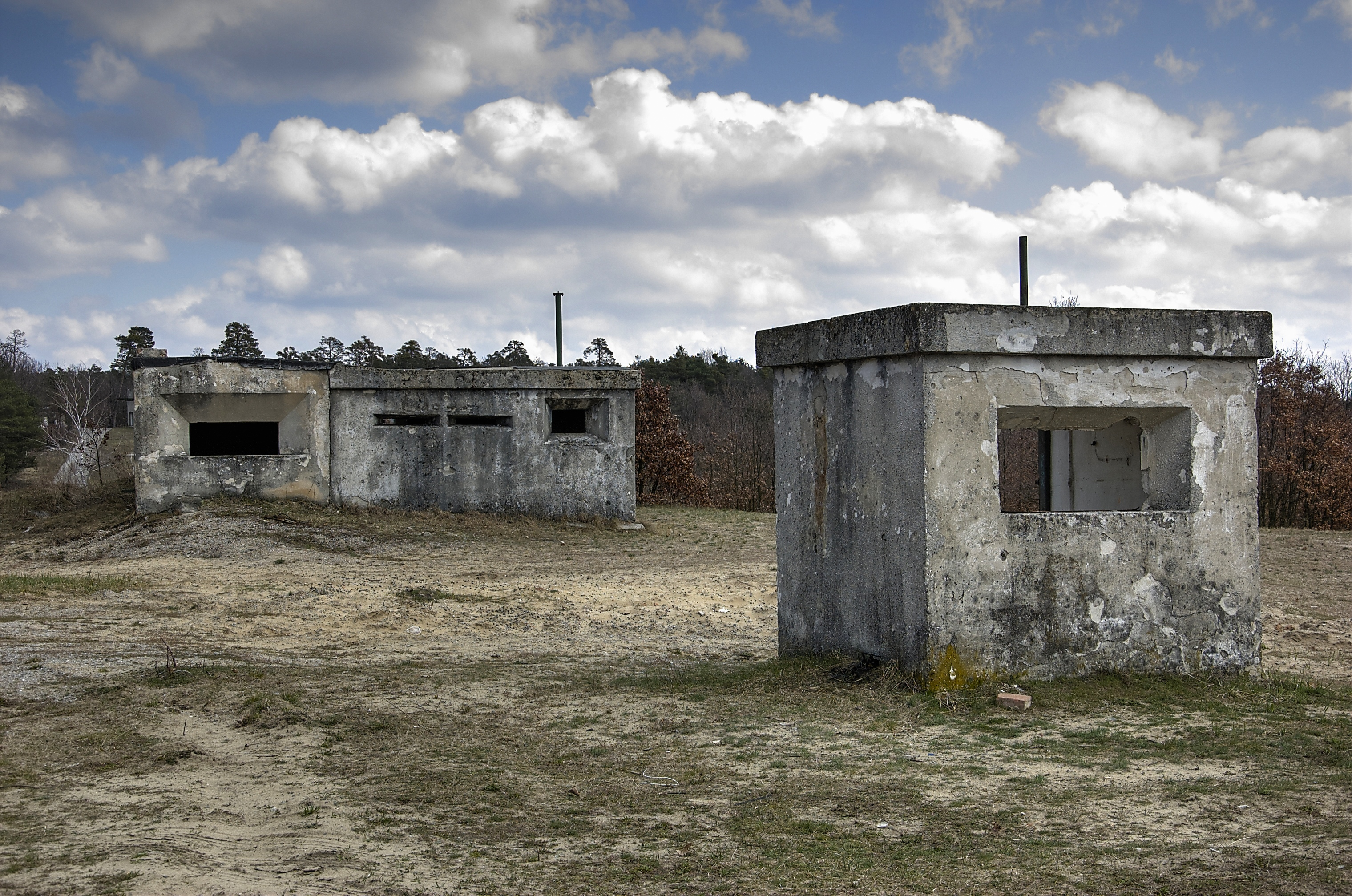
Abandoned observation bunkers

Záhorie is a military district (formerly formally also considered a municipality) in western Slovakia in the Malacky District in the Bratislava Region.

Since 1 July 2012 it is allowed to the wider public to enter a military district without permit. Military operations are taking place in the district and visitors have to obey rules of the military district and respect temporary or permanent entry restrictions.

Maps of the region, rules of movement in the military district and time schedules of actions in the military district can be found on the website of the Ministry of Defense, Slovak Republic.

== Geography ==
The municipality lies at an altitude of 216 metres (709 ft) and covers an area of 286.34 km^{2} (110.56 sq mi) (2025).

== Population ==
Population statistic (10 years)
Year	1995	2005	2015	2025
Count	508	283	153	117
Difference		−44.29%	−45.93%	−23.52%

Population statistic
Year	2024	2025
Count	124	117
Difference		−5.64%

It has a population of 117 people (31 December 2025).

=== Ethnicity ===
Census 2021 (1+ %)
Ethnicity	Number	Fraction
Slovak	133	90.47%
Not found out	11	7.48%
Czech	5	3.4%
Rusyn	2	1.36%
Total	147	

In year 2021 was 147 people by ethnicity 133 as Slovak, 11 as Not found out, 5 as Czech and 2 as Rusyn.

Note on population: The difference between the population numbers above and in the census (here and below) is that the population numbers above are mostly made up of permanent residents, etc.; and the census should indicate the place where people actually mainly live.
For example, a student is a citizen of a village because they have permanent residence there (they lived there as a child and has parents), but most of the time he studies at a university in the city.

=== Religion ===
Census 2021 (1+ %)
Religion	Number	Fraction
None	75	51.02%
Roman Catholic Church	47	31.97%
Not found out	13	8.84%
Evangelical Church	10	6.8%
Total	147	

In year 2021 was 147 people by religion 75 from None, 47 from Roman Catholic Church, 13 from Not found out, 10 from Evangelical Church, 1 from Other and 1 from Greek Catholic Church.
