= Petr Altrichter =

Czech conductor

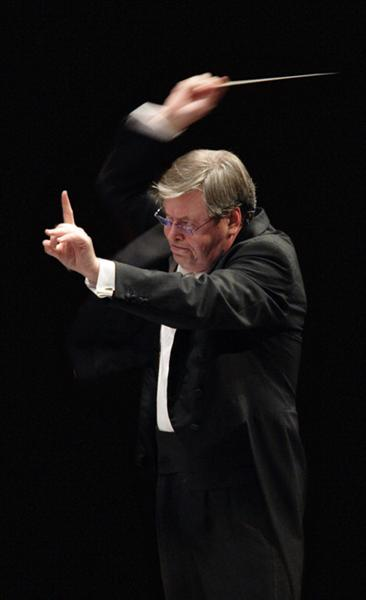
Altrichter in 2013

Petr Altrichter (born 24 May 1951 in Frenštát pod Radhoštěm, Czechoslovakia) is a Czech conductor. He studied French horn and conducting at the Conservatory of Music in Ostrava. He also studied at the Janáček Academy of Music and Performing Arts. He worked as an assistant conductor to Václav Neumann at the Czech Philharmonic Orchestra.

With the Prague Symphony Orchestra, Altrichter served as its principal guest conductor, and later principal conductor from 1990 to 1992. He conductor then in 1993 the DVD ArtHaus of the Requiem by Antonín Dvořák. In Germany, he was music director of the Südwestdeutsche Philharmonie from 1993 to 2004. In the UK, he was principal conductor of the Royal Liverpool Philharmonic Orchestra (RLPO) from 1997 to 2001. His RLPO tenure was marked by financial troubles which had begun before his tenure, in addition to criticism of his conducting style.

Since 2002, Altrichter is the principal conductor of the Brno Philharmonic Orchestra.

Cultural offices
Preceded by Jiří Bělohlávek	Principal Conductor, Prague Symphony Orchestra; 1990–1992	Succeeded by Martin Turnovský
Preceded by Aldo Ceccato	Principal Conductor, Brno Philharmonic Orchestra; 2002–2009	Succeeded by Aleksandar Marković
