= John Farnsworth Hall =

Australian conductor and violinist

John Farnsworth Hall (8 December 1899 – 15 June 1987) was an Australian conductor and violinist.

== Background ==
John Farnsworth Hall was born in Petersham, New South Wales, a suburb of Sydney, in 1899. He was an original violin student at the Sydney Conservatorium of Music (then known as the NSW State Conservatorium), under its founding director Henri Verbrugghen. He was appointed deputy leader of the New South Wales State Orchestra.

He was a member of the Farmers Trio, a pioneering radio chamber trio, in 1923. The other members were Horace Keats, piano, and John Boatwright, cello.

== Career ==
He went to London to further his career, and played under various notable conductors. He harboured an ambition to be a conductor himself, and while on tour in New Zealand, he was given an opportunity to conduct when Henri Verbrugghen fell ill.

He then became leader and deputy conductor of the new Sydney Symphony Orchestra (SSO). In 1946, Hall conducted the first performance by the SSO of Mozart's Flute Concerto No. 2 in D (an arrangement of his Oboe Concerto in C, K. 314), with Neville Amadio as soloist.

In 1947 he was appointed the first resident conductor of the Queensland Symphony Orchestra (QSO). During his time there, he introduced the symphonies of Ralph Vaughan Williams to Queensland concert-goers. Conducting the Queensland Symphony Orchestra, featuring soprano Tatjana Hitrina, he covered Auber's Fra Diavolo, Khachaturian's Masquerade and others including "Knowest thou the Land". It was broadcast on ABC radio at 9:15 pm Wednesday 11 November 1953. He made a classic recording of Alfred Hill's piece for narrator and orchestra, Green Water, with the QSO and the speaker Peter Munro in 1954.

From 1954 he was conductor in residence of the West Australian Symphony Orchestra.

== Later years ==
He retired from conducting in 1965, and died in 1987, aged 87. He was survived by his third wife and a daughter, both named Deirdre and grandchildren Brendan and Chapin Ayres.
