= Australian Press Council =

Self-regulatory body of Australian print media

- Established: 1976
- Website: https://presscouncil.org.au/

The Australian Press Council (APC) was established in 1976 with the goal of promoting high standards of media practice, community access to information of public interest, and freedom of expression through the media. The Council is the leading industry organisation for responding to complaints about Australian newspapers, magazines and digital outlets.

The Council has no legal authority to regulate the press, or to impose fines or other penalties. It relies on the press to voluntarily adhere to its standards of conduct and decisions, and to publish its adjudications of complaints. The Council is funded by its member publishers in the newspaper and magazine industries, receiving the majority of its funding from News Corporation. Government regulation of broadcast media in Australia is the purview by the Australian Communications and Media Authority.

== Functions ==
The APC is tasked under its Constitution to pursue its goals by:

- considering and dealing with complaints and concerns about material in newspapers, magazines and journals, published either in print or on the internet;
- encouraging and supporting initiatives to address the causes for reader's complaints and concerns;
- keeping under review, and where appropriate, challenging developments which may adversely affect the dissemination of information of public interest and may consequently threaten the public's right to know;
- making representations to governments, public inquiries and other forums as appropriate on matters concerning freedom of speech and access to information;
- undertaking research and consultation on developments in public policy affecting freedom of speech, and promoting;
- promoting an understanding of the roles and activities of the council through forums and consultations; and encouraging feedback for Council's consideration.

The Council's standards of good media practice are contained in its Statements of Principles, Specific Standards and Advisory Guidelines. The standards are applied by the Council when considering complaints and are used as the basis for statements by Council representatives about good media practice, whether addressing practitioners within the industry, journalism students or the broader community. The council also undertakes research and convenes conferences and seminars on aspects of media standards.

The Council's mandate to consider complaints extends to all print publications and related digital outlets, such as websites, of publishers which are "constituent bodies" of the council. These publications comprise about 90 percent of all print and online outlets in Australia representing some 850 mastheads. The Council also issues statements on policy matters within its areas of interest, including through submissions to parliamentary committees, commissions and other public bodies. It also undertakes research and convenes or participates in conferences and seminars on policy issues.

The APC receives more than 700 complaints each year. About three-quarters of those which are fully pursued by the complainant result in a correction, apology or some other form of action being taken.

== Members ==
The Australian Press Council comprises:

- a Chair
- a Vice-Chair and other public members who have no affiliation with a media organisation
- nominees of media organisations, including major publishers of newspapers and magazines; a nominee for small publishers, as well as a nominee for the principal union for employees in the media industry
- independent journalist members who are not employed by a media organisation

The independent Chair is appointed by the Council. The Public Members and Independent Journalist Members are appointed by the Council on the nomination of the Chair. The nominees of publishers are chosen by the media organisations which have agreed to support the Council and be subject to its complaints system. It meets quarterly, and is headed on administrative and other matters by an Executive Director.

== Chairman ==
The first chair of the council was Sir Frank Kitto. He was followed by Geoffrey Sawer, Hal Wootten, David Flint, Dennis Pearce, Ken McKinnon, Julian Disney and David Weisbrot. The current Chair of the Australian Press Council is Neville Stevens (effective 22 January 2018).

=== Weisbrot leadership ===
David Weisbrot chaired the Australian Press Council from March 2015 to July 2017, focusing on expanding membership, including from Indigenous and multicultural press, and strengthening the Council's role in defending press freedom. Key initiatives included creating a strategic plan, a reconciliation action plan, and an international conference on press freedom.

Weisbrot introduced an IT system for handling complaints, revamped the Press Freedom Medals, and promoted diversity in leadership. Weisbrot emphasized a cultural shift towards collegiality and continuous learning over punishing individual journalistic transgressions. He resigned in July 2017, with Neville Stevens appointed as the new chair in January 2018.

=== Stevens appointment ===
The Australian Press Council appointed Neville Stevens as its new chair effective 22 January 2018. Stevens had wide experience chairing panels and reviews in the private and public sectors and was a distinguished former public servant who headed two major Australian government departments, one of them dealing with telecommunications, media and broadcasting.

== Inefficacy and Member Frustrations ==
=== Seven West ===
In 2012, in response to frustrations about the inefficacy of the regulatory scheme, Seven West Media, publisher of The West Australian, withdrew from the APC and set up its own complaints body, the Independent Media Council, to handle complaints against its print and publications and websites.

=== MEAA ===
The Media Entertainment and Arts Alliance (MEAA) also withdrew from the Press Council in 1986 but rejoined in 2005. The organisation withdrew once again in 2021, citing deep frustrations and dissatisfaction with the self-regulatory scheme.

MEAA Media Federal President Marcus Strom said that the arbitrations by the Australian Press Council had been "inconsistent, slow, and increasingly out of touch with community expectations", also citing lack of consequences and publishers completely ignoring adjudication outcomes. MEAA Vice President Karen Percy said "It is MEAA's view that unfortunately the Press Council is no longer fit-for-purpose for the modern cross-platform media industry." However, MEAA continues to have a representative on Council as, under the rules of the APC, four years notice to withdraw must be given. The MEAA will complete its exit of the Australian Press Council in 2025.

== Anti-LGBTI Bias ==
Throughout 2010-2023, LGBTI peak bodies in Australia have repeatedly questioned whether the Australian Press Council treats complaints about LGBTI topics and individuals less favourably.

In 2013, the Australian Press Council dismissed a complaint about an article which unfairly and inaccurately associated transgender Australians with sex offenders. Seeming to overlook the well-settled 'harm minimisation' principle of Journalism ethics and standards, the Press Council dismissed the complaint citing "Freedom of Expression". In 2015 and several times in 2017, under the leadership of Executive Director John Pender, the Australian Press Council inexplicably dismissed complaints about articles containing obviously gratuitous references to a person's transgender status, often directly contradicting decisions in similar adjudications and well-settled international media ethics principles.

On 1 June, 2019, the Australian Press Council rejected a complaint about material that invited Australian transgender children to believe that they are "mutilated". In Adjudication 1795, the Australian Press Council dismissed a complaint which ridiculed a transgender person and trivialised and promoted extreme and gratuitous violence on the basis of their transgender status, claiming the article amounted to mere "humour". In subsequent legal proceedings, the NSW Civil and Administrative Tribunal found that the words implied in the Press Council's Adjudication "suggests that state funded medical treatment should be denied to the individual, specifically on the basis of their transgender status" and that the impugned article "calls for violence against transgender people...".

In 2017, the Australian Press Council began experiencing legal complaints of transgender discrimination. The organisation's 2018-2019 annual report stated that "Council vigorously defended its processes." Press Council Chair Neville Stephen's foreword in the organisation's Annual Report stated that the Council elected to "divert significant resources in this period to defend legal proceedings about its processes and decisions" rather than work with acutely vulnerable transgender groups to improve reporting standards. In 2021, a corpus linguistics analysis by the Professor Alex Garcia at the Sydney University Corpus Linguistics Laboratory found that transgender Australians are "Bombarded by outright harassment in the Australian Press" and that the Australian Press Council processes and procedures failed to uphold responsible reporting standards.

On 24 May 2023, The New South Wales Civil and Administrative Tribunal handed down a decision concerning an application for transgender discrimination, finding that the APC treats complaints about transgender subjects and individuals less favourably:

"When considered at its highest, I am satisfied that the comparators relied upon by the Applicant establishes that, when comparing those matters which involve transgender and non-transgender grounds, there is prima facie evidence of a different decision-making practice by the (Australian Press Council), demonstrating that less favourable treatment is accorded to a complaint of transgender discrimination."

== Calls for Reform ==
The Council has in the past been criticised for being unable to censure its members in anything more than a minor manner when standards are breached and for being a "toothless tiger" as a result of being funded by the publishers whose work it is meant to evaluate.

The former Chairman of Australian Consolidated Press, Kerry Packer described the council as "window dressing" at a 1991 parliamentary inquiry into the print media. A former chair of the council, Professor Dennis Pearce, told the Finkelstein Media Inquiry that the authority was overly influenced by concerns of losing its sponsors and that the industry was reluctant to fund its own watchdog. Another former Chairman, Ken McKinnon supported calls for the APC to have a stronger role and be better resourced, instead of statutory regulation. The Australian Greens Senator Bob Brown has described the APC as a "hollow vessel" and supports reform towards a statutory body with better funding.

In the wake of the Finkelstein Media Inquiry, publishers agreed on a major strengthening of the Press Council. Funding was raised from $0.8 million to $1.6 million in 2012-13 and $1.8 million in the following year. News Corp Australia, Fairfax Media, the media union (MEAA) and the other publisher members of the council agreed to specific funding commitments for the three years, with subsequent commitments to be agreed at least two to three years in advance, all of which have since lapsed.

== Criticisms by News Corp in 2014 ==
Beginning in August 2014, The Australian newspaper, owned by News Corp Australia, published a series of more than 20 articles and editorials highly critical of the Press Council’s activities and leadership. The newspaper accused the Council of overstepping its mandate and issuing questionable adjudications.

The newspaper accused the APC of erratic rulings, inefficiency, and being influenced by the chair, Julian Disney's personal biases. The Australian expressed a lack of confidence in Disney and condemned the Council's direction. David Salter, former Media Watch producer, argued that News Corp's criticisms revealed the flaws in media self-regulation, suggesting that News Corp only supported self-regulation when it served its interests. Julian Disney acknowledged historical tensions between News Corp and the APC. The Press Council responded by reaffirming support for Disney and condemning The Australian for factual inaccuracies and breaching confidentiality.

== See also ==
- Media of Australia
