= Václav Smetáček =

Czech conductor (1906–1986)

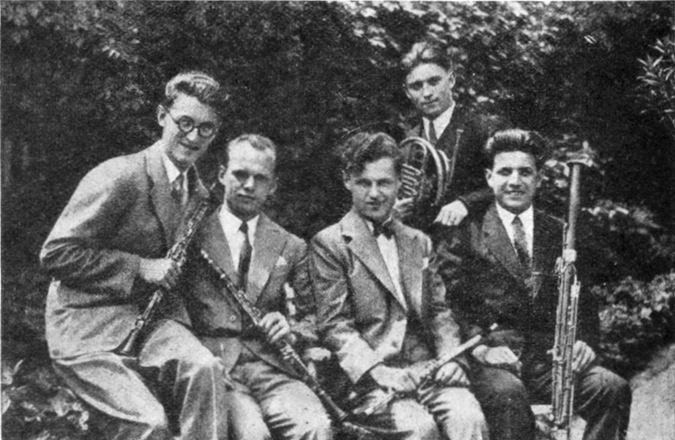
Prague Wind Quintet, c. 1931 (from left to right: Václav Smetáček – oboe, Vladimír Říha – clarinet, Rudolf Hertl – flute, Otakar Procházka – horn, Karel Bidlo – bassoon)

Václav Smetáček (30 September 1906 – 18 February 1986) was a Czech conductor, composer and oboist.

== Life and career ==
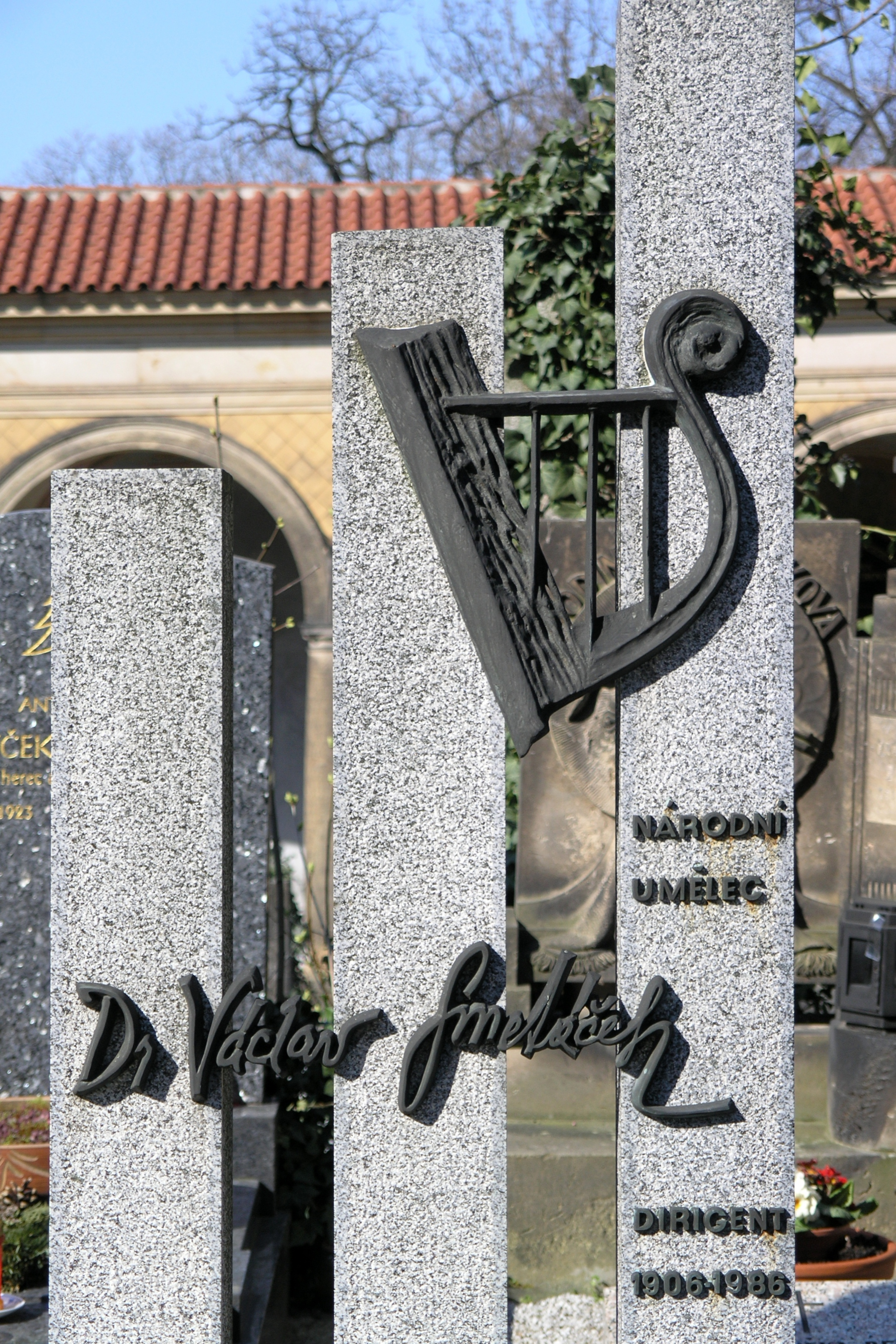
Grave of Smetáček at Vyšehrad Cemetery

Smetáček was born on 30 September 1906 in Brno. He studied in Prague among others with Jaroslav Křička, conducting with Metod Doležil and Pavel Dědeček, musicology, aesthetics, and philosophy at Charles University, receiving his doctorate in musicology in 1933. He was the founder and a member of the Prague Wind Quintet (1928), for whom he also composed and arranged compositions. From 1930 to 1933, he was a member of the Czech Philharmonic Orchestra, and from 1934 to 1943, he worked on Czech Radio as conductor and editor. From 1945 to 1966 he worked as a pedagogue at the Prague Conservatory and Academy of Performing Arts in Prague.

As a conductor of the Prague Symphony Orchestra, he made several innovations. He enlarged its repertoire with 20th-century music and larger vocal symphonic works (including those of Rejcha, Mozart, Cherubini, Dvořák, Foerster, Martinů, Orff, Kabeláč, and Fišer). From 1938, he performed abroad. He was invited later to the many important European and overseas music centres. He primarily devoted himself to concert music, but he also studied opera. He received many awards for his creations.

His discography includes suites from Rimsky-Korsakov's operas The Golden Cockerel and the Legend of the Invisible City of Kitezh, Carl Orff's Carmina Burana, Mendelssohn's A Midsummer Night's Dream, The Hebrides and Calm Sea and Prosperous Voyage, Tchaikovsky's Symphony No. 1 "Winter Daydreams", Foerster's Symphony No.4 "Velika noc", Bizet's L'Arlésienne, Chabrier's España and Dvořák's St Ludmila.

Smetáček died on 18 February 1986 in Prague.

Cultural offices
Preceded by Rudolf Pekárek	Music Director, Prague Symphony Orchestra; 1942–1972	Succeeded by Ladislav Slovák
