= Abrod =

National nature reserve in Slovakia

Coordinates: 48.5320°N 17.0069°E

- IUCN category IV (habitat/species management area)
- Interactive map of Abrod
- Area: 0.92 km^{2} (0.36 sq mi)
- Established: 1964

Abrod is a national nature reserve in the Slovak municipality of Veľké Leváre in the Malacky District. The nature reserve covers an area of 92 ha of the Borská lowland area. It has a protection level of 4 under the Slovak nature protection system. The nature reserve is part of the Site of Community Importance with the same name which measures 162 ha. Since 1988 it is also a part of the Záhorie Protected Landscape Area.

== Description ==
Abrod is an elongated depression of terrain stretching a length of about 2 km along the creek Porec. This depression in combination with impermeable loamy subsoil and occasional floods creates the right conditions for the creation of wetlands and bog vegetation. The protected area consists therefore of fen vegetation with scientifically important plant communities of relic and rare plant species. It is also an important ornithological site. It is used as a research object.

== Fauna ==
Numerous animal species live in the Abrod nature reserve. Some bird species that are permanently present include northern goshawk, great reed warbler, Eurasian reed warbler, long-tailed tit, Eurasian skylark, common kingfisher, mallard, garganey, greater white-fronted goose, greylag goose, bean goose, tree pipit, grey heron, common pochard, common buzzard, common linnet, European goldfinch, European greenfinch, Eurasian siskin, white stork, western marsh harrier, hen harrier, Montagu's harrier, hawfinch, common raven, carrion crow, common quail and corn crake. Many of these species are also reproducing in the area. Some bird species that are only wintering here include Eurasian sparrowhawk, merlin and crested tit.

Amphibian species living in the area include the European fire-bellied toad. Mammal species present in the area include Eurasian beaver and greater mouse-eared bat. Fish species include spined loach, European weatherfish and European bitterling. Invertebrates include Lucanus cervus, large copper, dusky large blue, scarce large blue, Osmoderma eremita and Vertigo angustior.

== Flora ==
At the moment Abrod mainly consists of fens with purple moor-grass. Abrod is the largest complex of this type of bog in Slovakia. This habitat along with the remains of calcareous fens and lowland hay meadows form the main subject of the protection zone. Abrod is also an important habitat for the appearance of a number of rare and endangered species of flora in Slovakia. The area is known as an important botanical site at least since 1923. It is the only locality in Slovakia with viable populations of marsh gladiolus, black bog-rush or early marsh-orchid. In addition to these and 116 other endangered species of plants, the area also forms the refuge for several other plant species such as orchids like bug orchid, Anacamptis palustris, but also allseed, Achillea asplenifolia and others. Other more common plants include Cirsium brachycephalum.

== Recreation ==
The best access to the site is from the station of Závod, from where a narrow asphalt road leads along the railway to the border of the site. Close by swimming is possible in Malé Leváre. Walks can be made in the extensive pine forests surrounding the nature reserve.
