= Gabor Reeves =

- Born: Gabor Revesz; 1928; Budapest, Hungary
- Died: 2008 (aged 79–80)
- Genres: Classical, chamber music, jazz
- Occupation: Musician
- Instrument: Clarinet
- Years active: 1950s to 1996
- Formerly of: University of Adelaide Wind Quartet, Queensland State Orchestra, The Sydney Wind Quintet

Gabor Reeves was a Hungarian-born clarinetist who was popular on the continent and found popularity in his new home of Australia.

== Background ==
Gabor Reeves was one of Australia's leading classical musicians. He was also a burlesque showman and in the early stages played Jazz to support himself.

He was born Gabor Revesz in Budapest, Hungary in 1928 to Jewish parents Oszkar Revesz and Mitszu Kovesi. Oscar was a managing director of a large porcelain factory. He was also an accomplished amateur violinist. During World War II the family converted to Catholicism to avoid persecution.

He came to Australia in 1948, and his last name was changed to the anglicized Reeves.

During Reeves' career, he found great success as a soloist in chamber music in both England and the European continent.

In 1951, Reeves became the principal clarinetist for the Queensland State Orchestra.

It was written in an edition of The Age (4 October 1963) that he would attempt to gauge how his performance would be, he would do his last rehearsal in front of his wife. She would then tell him what she thought of it. The paper also wrote that he wouldn't always take his wife's advice.

== Career ==
=== 1950s to 1960s ===
On Saturday 12 July 1952, Reeves and soprano singer Tatjana Hitrina performed at the Sydney Town Hall with the Sydney Symphony Orchestra which was conducted by Tibor Paul.

It was reported in the Friday 4 October 1963 issue of The Age that on the coming Tuesday, Reeves was to appear with soprano Rita Streich at the Town Hall.

It was announced in the 28 August 1964 edition of The Australian Jewish Herald that Reeves was appearing as guest artist in a chamber music concert at the Coppin Hall in Prahran at 8 pm on 30 August 1964.

On 22 July 1965, an ensemble comprising Thomas Wightman on bassoon, Gabor Reeves on clarinet, David Cubbin on flute, Stanley Fry on horn, Jiri Tancibudek on oboe, and Clemens Leske on piano performed at a mid-day concert at the Elder Hall in Adelaide, South Australia.

As part of the University of Adelaide Quintet, he was set to appear at the City Hall in Bendigo on 1 April 1966.

=== 1970s to 1980s ===
The Adelaide Wind Quintet was appearing at the City Hall in Bendigo at 8:15 pm on Wednesday 15 April 1970.

In the early 1970s, Reeves, the Adelaide Wind Quintet and indigenous didgeridoo player George Winunguj played together. Other musicians were David Cubbin, Jiri Tancibudek, Thomas Wightman and Patrick Brislan. They can be heard on the track, "Sextet for Didjeridu and Wind Instruments" on the Symphony No. 1 And No. 2 album credited to George Dreyfus on Southern Cross Records SCCD 1024.

In the early 1980s, Reeves was a member of the Sydney Wind Quintet. The ensemble also included Michael Scott, Josef Hanic, Gordon Skinner, and Anthony Buddle. They were pictured in the October 1982 issue of Electronics Australia.

On 30 October 1988, Reeves and his ensemble played at the Verbruggen Hall Conservatorium. Performing with Reeves were Rachel Valler on piano, Alex Todicescu on viola, Georg Pederson on cello, and his sons Ron Reeves on percussion and Stephen Reeves on double bass. The music they were performing included Mazart and Brahms. The performance was reviewed by Fred Blanks in the 4 November issue of the Sydney Morning Herald. He mentioned Reeves' excellent clarinetting and said that he continued to show others how the clarinet should behave.

=== 1990s ===
For his services to music and his work in education, Reeves was awarded an AM. In 1996 he was still teaching and playing chamber music but was forced to stop due to Parkinson's disease.

== Death ==
He died in 2008. He was survived by his wife Anthea, former wife Zsoka, brother Janos, his sisters-in-law Maria and Diana, his sons Steve and Ron, his stepchildren Nikki and Richard and their families.

== Discography ==
Singles & EPs
Act	Release	Catalogue	Year	Role	Notes
National Folk Dance Players	National Dances 5	His Master's Voice 7EG 8754	1962	Clarinet	EP
Pat Shuldham-Shaw	European National Dances - Dances of Portugal	His Master's Voice 7EG 8786	1966	Clarinet	EP

Album
Act	Release	Catalogue	Year	Role	Notes
The University of Adelaide Wind Quintet	Plays Mozart - Hindemith - Danzi - Ibert	W&G WG-B-S-5008	1966	Clarinet	LP
Don Banks, Peter Tahourdin, Robert Cooper, Garbor Reeves, Clemens Leske	Australian Composers	Australian Broadcasting Commission RRC30	1967	Clarinet	LP
George Dreyfus	Symphony No. 1 And No. 2	Southern Cross Records SCCD 1024	1992	Clarinet	CD
