= Tatjana Hitrina =

- Also known as: Tatiana Hitrina, Tatjana Froimoff Goutman
- Born: C 1907 or c 1919; Moscow, Russia
- Died: 11 Nov 1995 Dandenong, Victoria, Australia
- Genres: Classical
- Occupations: Singer, music teacher
- Instrument: Voice
- Spouse: Grecia Gootman aka Grisha Froimoff-Goutman

Tatjana Hitrina was a Russian-born soprano singer who escaped the Russian Revolution. She eventually settled in Australia and established herself as a singer in various Australian orchestras. She was also a vocal teacher.

== Background ==
Tatjana Hitrina was the daughter of a Russian general in the Czarist army, Major General Alexander Nikolaevich Hitrin. He was a quartermaster general of the South Russian Armed Forces. While still a small child in the 1920s, she and her parents fled Russia and went to Belgrade due to the Russian Revolution.

Tatjana's singing began at the age of sixteen. It was on the insistence of Italian Professor Signor Tarallo that she entered the Belgrade Musical College. She sang with the Belgrade National Opera. Following her graduation from college, she entered the Vienna Conservatorium.

While in Belgrade she sang before the Duchess of Kent.

In 1950, she came to Australia. Over the next two years she worked as a domestic in the Brisbane Gerneral Hospital and then a biscuit factory.

By 1954, soprano Hitrina was one of the soloists in the Beethoven's Ninth Symphony by the Sydney Symphony Orchestra. She also worked with conductor Rudolf Pekarek.

She was one of the resident artists that appeared in public concerts by the ABC Orchestras.

== Career (Europe) ==
=== Yugoslavia ===
In late 1936, the Belgrade Operetta company went on tour to Subotica. It also included a guest performance by a well-known Yugoslav film diva, Rakel Davido. Hitrina, Ivka Berković, Ms. Vuličević, Dino Ljubišić, Dragutin Levak, Josip Bakotić,and Milan Odžić also took part. Along with Ivan Durđević, Hitrina was one of the company’s leading artists.

On 3 October 1942, Tatjana Hitrina performed at the National Theater in Belgrade. She was photographed at a concert with a frowning SS-Oberscharführer Josef Schifko who was adjusting her microphone. Schifko was a cameraman of the 8th Platoon, SS War Correspondent Battalion.

=== Austria ===
After spending several years in Vienna and having studied at the Vienna Conservatory, she left the country in 1950 for Australia.

== Career (Australia) ==
Now in Australia, Hitrina was part of an event by new Australians who were from Greta Camp. It was organized by camp entertainment officer Mrs. Rene Dooley.

Along with Hungarian Tenor, Dr. Karolyi Zeold, Tatjana Hitrina was set to appear at the Citrus Festival in Gosford which commenced on Saturday 11 November 1950.

=== Cockpit ===
It was reported by the Sunday Mail in the publication's 15 June 1952 issue that Tatjana Hitrina was to play a part in a stage production that she knew how to play. Her husband, Mr. G. F. Goutman spoke on her behalf as she didn't speak English. He told of her having to flee to Belgrade with her parents at the age of five during the Russian Revolution and suffer the horrors of war. The article titled "She doesn't have to act" also included her picture. The play was Bridget Boland's Cockpit. It was a Brisbane Repertory Theater production. Hitrina played the lead role of Claudia a displaced person. Ray Barrett, Rosemary Stevenson, Gloria Birdwood-Smith and Betty Ross were also in the play. The production which ran from 18 June to 21 June 1952 was produced by Babette Stephens and ran at the Albert Hall in Brisbane. The play received a positive review in the 19 June issue of the Courier Mail. The reviewer called the play thought provoking.

=== Further activities ===
On Saturday 12 July 1952, Tatjana Hitrina and clarinetist Gabor Reeves performed at the Sydney Town Hall with the Sydney Symphony Orchestra which was conducted by Tibor Paul. Hitrina sang an aria from Smetana's The Bartered Bride. Reviewer for the Sunday Mail, Ernest Briggs said that she sang it with a sympathetic impression of the essential mood of the song. Hitrina also went into "Knowest thou the Land" from Mignon which Briggs called a favorable impression.

Hitrina and pianist Una Murray had the Legends of Music 6:05 slot on Radio 4QB Wide Bay for 1 February 1953.

In an event organized by the Repatriation Department, Hitrina was to perform a recital of European folk songs for blinded ex-servicemen in the ABC studios on Wednesday 26 March 1953. The 3 to 4 pm show was to feature accompanist Ruby Knight and Mr. C. Goutman, a Polish migrant doing the commentary.

Tatjana Hitrina and harpist Una Morgan were pictured in the 8 August 1953 issue of The ABC Weekly. They were to give a recital on 12 August which would be broadcast on Radio 4QR.

As part of a quartet of soloists which included tenor Daryl O'Donahue, Contralto Eunice Knap, and Bass Harold Cook, Hitrina (spelt Tatiana) was to appear at the Albert Hall on 26 September 1953. They would be performing music from Dvorak's Stabat Mater.

According to an article in the 11 October 1953 issue of the Sunday Mail, Tatjana Hitrina had now been in Australia for two years, and was running a singing studio in Whickham Terrace, Brisbane.

An event to help Australian flood victims was organized by Hitrina and to be held at the Congregational Church on Friday 5 March 1954. This was in response to a plea by Rev. Rees Thomas, the president of the Queensland Council of Churches. In addition to her organization role, Hitrina was also one of the soloists. According to the news article, her age was 35 at the time.

On Saturday 12 June 1954 Hitrina performed in the Lord Mayor's Room in Brisbane where she was the featured artist. Her performance was reviewed by Dr. Robert Dalley-Scarlett for the Courier-Mail. It was a carefully selected programme, properly arranged and in chronological order. He said that Hitrina knew how to sing and make proper use of lip and tongue action and how to exploit the facial expression to a full value. He also said that the experience that Hitrina had in Europe enabled her to be at her best in work by Hadyn and Mozart, but she was equally enjoyable in the lieder groups. Another artist, Elspeth Capper was referred to as the assisting artist. Dalley-Scarlett said that she played the Schuman and Alfred Hill works with adequate technique and careful interpretation.

=== Work with Sydney Symphony Orchestra ===
An article about Hitrina with her photo appeared in the 23 September issue of the Courier Mail. Earlier that month she had successfully auditioned for Eugene Goosens, the conductor for the Sydney Symphony Orchestra. From that an engagement had been secured for her to sing under his conductorship in Sydney on the 3rd, 4th, 6th and 8 November.

Hitrina was pictured on page 21 of the 30 October 1954 issue of the ABC Weekly. The magazine wrote that she was to make her first appearance in Sydney for the A.B.C. In addition to Hitrina, the other soloists were to be Iris Moxley (contralto), Ronald Dowd (tenor) and Stewart Harvey (baritone). Along with Hitrina, the other three vocalists which were Iris Moxley, Allan Ferris and Stewart Harvey, performed well with the Sydney Symphony Orchestra under Eugene Goosens on Wednesday 3 November 1954. In a review of the overall performance by The Sydney Morning Herald the following day, the reviewer said that the vocal performance was well balanced and distinctly audible. It seems that Allan Ferris instead of Ronald Dowd was one of the solosists.

It was announced in the 8 November issue of Melbourne newspaper, The Argus that Hitrina's performance in Beethoven's Ninth Symphony by the Sydney Symphony Orchestra and the Hurlsone Choral Society under Eugene Goossen's direction would be broadcast from the Sydney Town Hall on Radio 3LO. In the ABC Weekly 6 November publication's report on the upcoming 8 November concert, Hitrina's name was misspelt as Tatyana Hitrina.

=== Further activities ===
Hitrina and Queensland Symphony Orchestra conductor Rudolf Pekarek were pictured in the 11 February 1956 issue of the ABC Weekly. They were in the 8:00pm slot for Tuesday 14 February for a Queensland broadcast. The pieces to perform included "March Militaire" by Schubert, and "Centre of Vienna" by Fischer etc.

In late 1961, Hitrina appeared at a WIZO event which also included harmonica player Larry Adler. She was accompanied by Dr. Steven Kinston.

== Personal life ==
Tatjana Hitrina was married to Mr. G. F. Goutman who was a Brisbane-based Migration official. They were married in the early 1950s. She was also known as Tatjana Froimoff Goutman. She resided for a period of time in Ascog Terrace, Toowong around 1952. By 1954 she was living in the Brisbane suburb of Paddington.

== Death ==
Tatjana Hitrina died in Dandenong, Victoria, Australia on 11 November 1995.
