= The Lost People =

1949 British film by Muriel Box and Bernard Knowles

- British quad poster
- Directed by: Muriel Box; Bernard Knowles
- Written by: Bridget Boland
- Based on: Cockpit by Bridget Boland
- Produced by: Gordon Wellesley
- Starring: Dennis Price; Mai Zetterling; Richard Attenborough
- Cinematography: Jack Asher
- Edited by: Gordon Hales
- Music by: John Greenwood
- Production company: Gainsborough Pictures
- Distributed by: General Film Distributors
- Release date: 22 August 1949
- Running time: 89 minutes
- Country: United Kingdom
- Language: English
- Box office: £80,000 (by 1953)

The Lost People, also known as Cockpit, is a 1949 British drama film directed by Muriel Box and Bernard Knowles and starring Dennis Price, Mai Zetterling and Richard Attenborough. It was written by Bridget Boland based on her 1948 play Cockpit.

== Plot ==
After the Second World War, some British soldiers are guarding a theatre in Germany containing various refugees and prisoners trying to work out what to do with them. However, the displaced people, after uniting against fascism for five years, begin to disintegrate into their own ancient feuds: Serb against Croat, Pole against Russian, resistance fighter against collaborator and everyone against the Jews. Two people, Jan and Lily, begin a romance and decide to wed. However, one of the refugees is diagnosed with bubonic plague.

== Cast ==
- Dennis Price as Ridley
- Mai Zetterling as Lily
- Richard Attenborough as Jan
- Siobhán McKenna as Marie
- Maxwell Reed as Peter
- William Hartnell as Barnes
- Gerard Heinz as Professor
- Zena Marshall as Anna
- Olaf Pooley as Milosh
- Harcourt Williams as priest
- Philo Hauser as Draja
- Jill Balcon as Rebecca
- Grey Blake as Saunders
- Marcel Poncin as Duval
- Nelly Arno as old woman in box
- George Benson as driver
- Peter Bull as Wolf
- Paul Hardtmuth as Jiri
- Tutte Lemkow as Jaroslav
- Pamela Stirling as young woman in box
- Charles Hawtrey as prisoner
- Herbert Lom as guest

== Production ==
It was shot partly at Denham Studios outside London with sets designed by the art directors John Elphick and George Provis. The film's costumes were designed by Julie Harris.

Associate producer Alfred Roome called the film "terrible ... we shot for ages, then it stopped and started again and got terribly boring ... it actually had two or three directors who came and went."

== Critical reception ==
The Monthly Film Bulletin wrote:

There is nothing wrong with the theme (though it has lost its topicality), but everything wrong with the way in which it is handled: the subject demands deep sympathy and comprehension, but the too-familiar Gainsborough treatment gives it vulgar novelette stature and a blundering insularity. The attempts to be serious and to point a moral give the effect of talking down, as if to an audience of idiots, from the complacent and insulting point of view that foreigners exist merely to get into difficulties from which the British have to extricate them. The script is deplorably crude and stilted, but a greater disaster comes with the direction. Technically incompetent, flat and lifeless, it achieves climaxes solely by loud, emphatic bursts of background music over clumsily-handled crowd movements. The crowds of extras wear their rags and foreign accents uneasily, as might be expected: of the leading players, Mai Zetterling (impeccably made up throughout) gives almost a caricature of her familiar refugee role, Dennis Price is ineffectual and anonymous, Richard Attenborough bewildered, and Siobhan McKenna tries hard to graft Irish charm on to a French communist agitator. One can only hope, at least, that the film will never be shown abroad.

The Radio Times Guide to Films gave the film 1/5 stars, writing: "Bridget Boland's play, Cockpit, which tackled the problem of Europeans left stateless and homeless after the Second World War, meant well and was excitingly experimental. This film version, still confined to one set, doesn't work. It's all talk and no action, and additional love scenes, written by Muriel Box, stick out like sore thumbs. Worse, the efforts of British officer Dennis Price to get people of many nationalities to cooperate with each other now come across as xenophobic."

In British Sound Films: The Studio Years 1928–1959 David Quinlan rated the film as "average", writing: "Poor transition of stage play to screen, some critics liked it, not so the public."
