= Jiří Kout =

Czech conductor

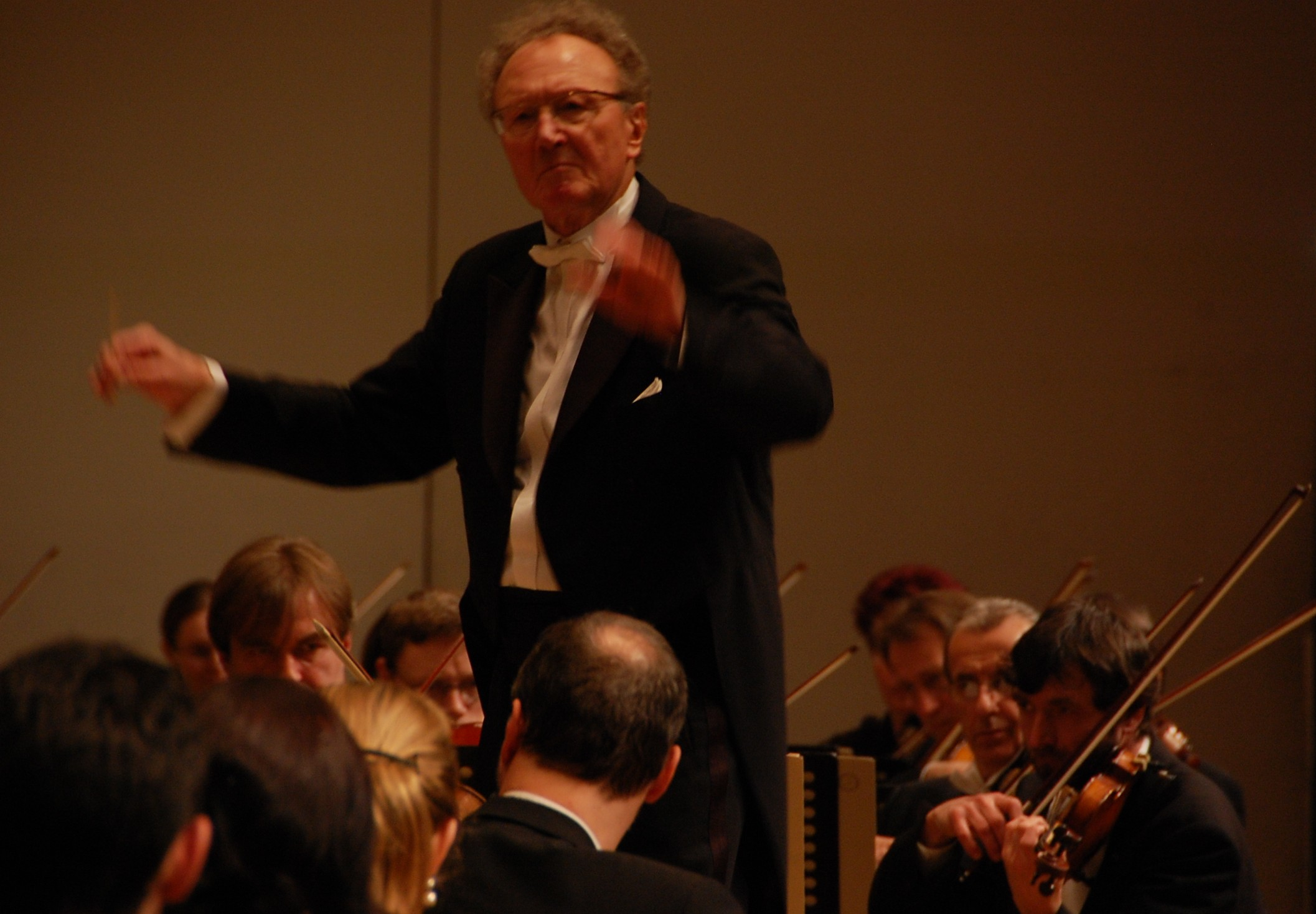
Kout in 2008

Jiří Kout (born 26 December 1937) is a Czech conductor. As of 2013, he works as both chief conductor of the Saint Gallen Symphony Orchestra and as a director of the Theater St. Gallen.

Coming from the eastern surroundings of Prague, Kout experienced the Soviet influence early on when he worked as a conductor in Plzeň at the Josef Kajetán Tyl Theatre and was banned from performing there for four years. In 1977, he took advantage of a business trip to the West to leave the Czech Republic permanently.

Kout's career began in 1976 with a position at the Deutsche Oper am Rhein (in Düsseldorf and Duisburg).After that he became general music director at Saarbrücken Opera House, where he conducted Wagner´s Ring cycle (1996–1990). At the Deutsche Oper Berlin and the Leipzig Opera he spontaneously stood in for ailing colleagues and thereby obtained further engagements. He became famous with his interpretations of the works of Leoš Janáček (such as his rehearsal of Jenůfa).

When Kout was able to return to Prague after the fall of the Iron Curtain, he also returned to the desk of the Czech Philharmonic.

From 2006 to 2013, Kout headed the Symfonický orchestr hlavního města Prahy FOK.
