= Cockpit (play) =

- Written by: Bridget Boland

Premiere
- Date premiered: February, 1948
- Place premiered: The Playhouse, London

Cockpit is a 1947 play by Bridget Boland. It first opened in 1948. Since then, it has been staged at various times over the years.

== Background ==
It is about the displacement of people in a time after the second world war. The setting is in a German town under British control in May 1945.

The production opened at the Playhouse in London in February 1948.

The idea for the play came about as a result of Bridget Boland going to Germany in May 1945. She was there to research subjects to be used as material for plays. Her reflections were written in a pressbook for the film, The Lost People. What she described about the displaced people was "a weird surrealistic, dream-like quality about their movements". Coming back home and haunted by the memories of what she saw, she felt the need to write her play about this.

In a review of a 2017 production of the play, the reviewer for The Scotsman wrote, "the story and the scenario have the urgency of vital documentary drama: a raw living-newspaper piece, 70 years old, that has suddenly become contemporary again".

== Versions over the years ==
In 1952, an Australian production of the play ran from 18 June to 21 June 1952 at the Albert Hall in Brisbane. Produced by Babette Stephens, it featured Tatjana Hitrina in the lead role of Claudia. It also featured Ray Barrett, Rosemary Stevenson, Gloria Birdwood-Smith and Betty Ross. According to the 15 June issue of Sunday Mail, Hitrina was in a role that she didn't have to act. She had lived the life of a displaced person. Speaking on her behalf, her husband, Mr. G. F. Goutman explained that she had to flee to Belgrade with her parents at the age of five during the Russian Revolution and suffer the horrors of war. The play received a positive review in the 19 June issue of the Courier Mail. The reviewer called the play thought provoking.

A production by Wils Wilson ran at the Royal Lyceum Theatre in Edinburgh in October 2017. The play's multinational cast included Nebli Basani, Peter Hannah, Dylan Read, Sandra Kassman, Kaisa Hammarlund and Adam Tompa.

In 2021, Philip Wilson directed a LAMDA production which starred Eduardo Ackerman as Captain Ridley and Lottie Amor as Claudia. It ran at the Sainsbury Theatre from May to June.

== Adaptation ==
The 1949 film, The Lost People was based on the play. It starred Richard Attenborough, Mai Zetterling, Dennis Price and Siobhan McKenna.
