= Greta Army Camp =

WWII army camp in New South Wales, Australia

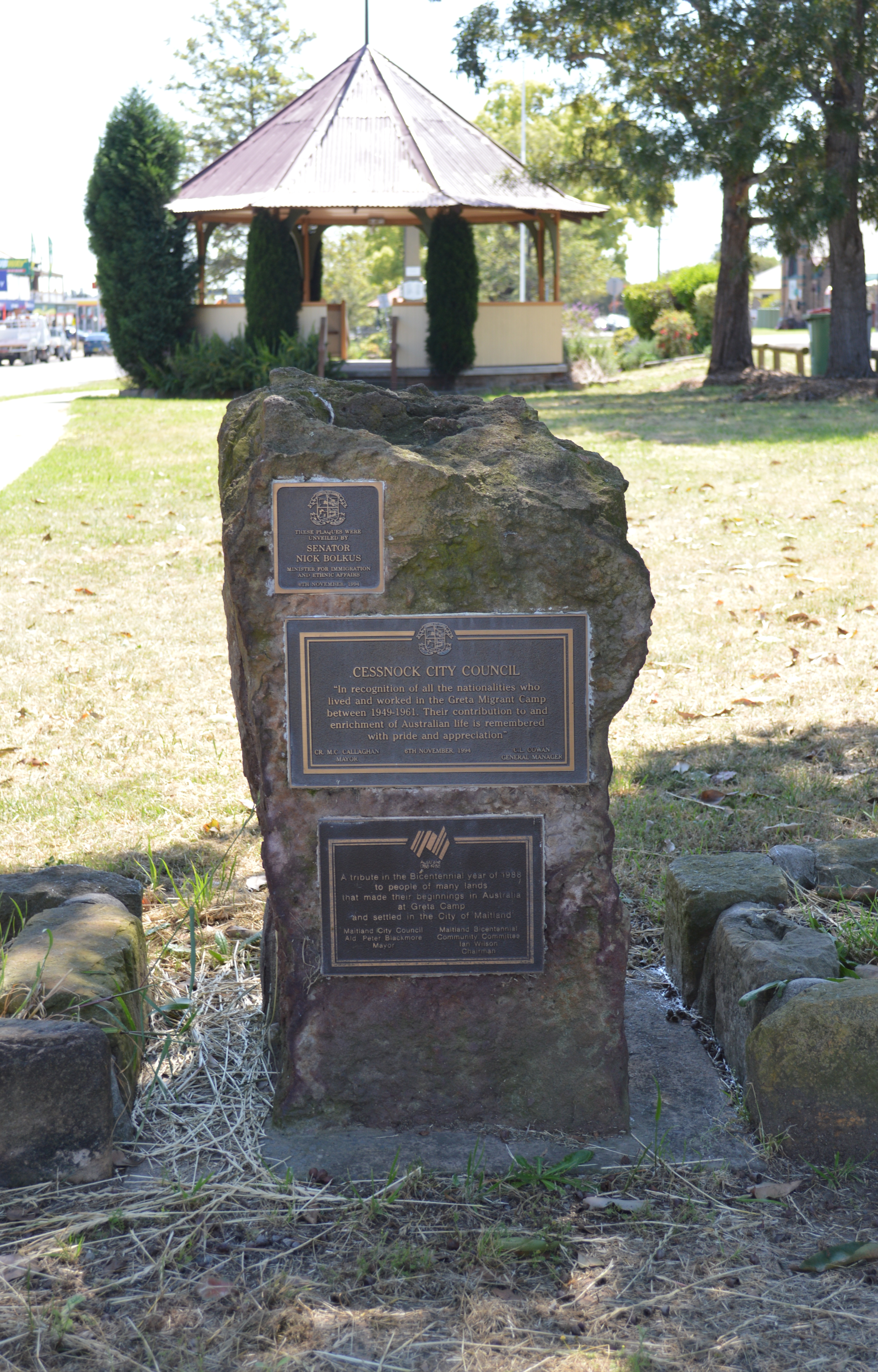
Monument commemorating Greta Migrant Camp

Greta Army Camp was an Australian Army camp built in 1939 near Greta, New South Wales, Australia. It was used for training soldiers of the Second Australian Imperial Force (2AIF) during World War II. After World War II, the camp was converted into a migrant camp. The Australian army sold the site at auction in 1980.

== History ==
In November 1939, 2,930 acres (11.9 km^{2}) of land was compulsorily acquired in the Allandale-Greta area to create one of the Australian Army's largest training camps. Built for the training of the 6th Division of the 2AIF because the existing Australian army facilities were occupied by Citizens Military Force units.

The 2/11th Battalion arrived at the camp on 15 December 1939 and were later joined by the 2/10th Battalion. The camp facilities were expanded during World War II, with two parts of the camp known as "Chocolate City", due to the brown-coloured oiled timber weatherboard buildings in that part of the camp and "Silver City", due to corrugated iron Nissen huts built in that part of the camp. Citizens Military Force units were also trained at the camp, with up to 60,000 Australian soldiers trained during World War II.

After the war, much of the field training areas were returned to grazing purposes, however the camp was still used for the training of troops preparing to join the British Commonwealth Occupation Forces in Japan.

=== Greta Migrant Camp ===
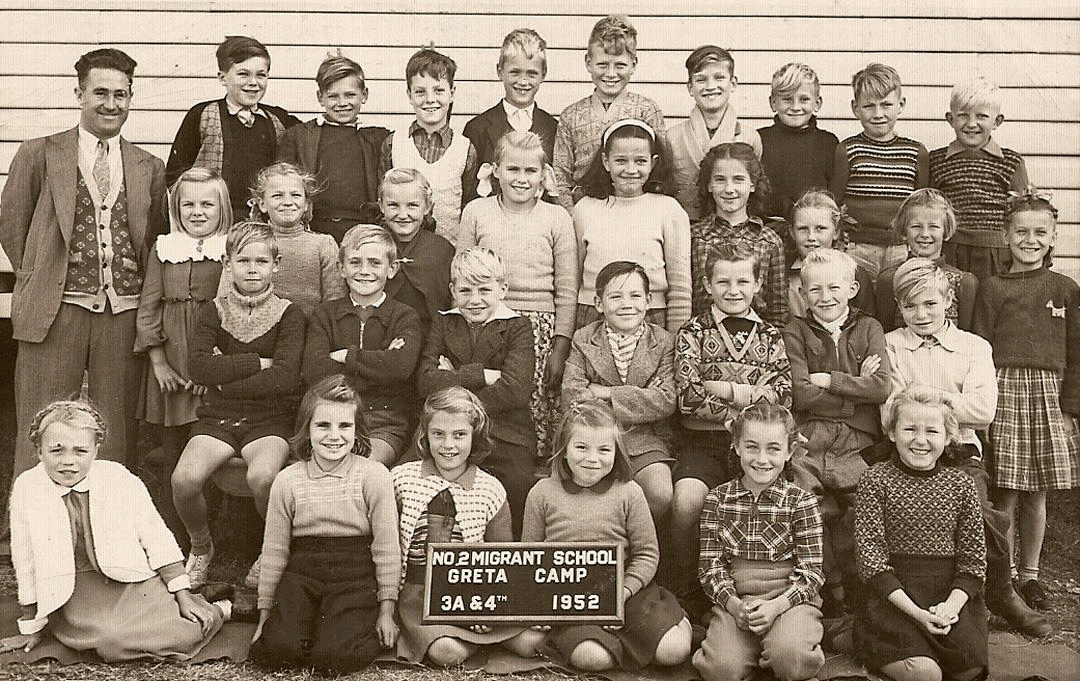
Students at the Greta Migrant Camp School in 1952

In 1949 Greta Camp was transferred to the Department of Immigration who transformed it into one of Australia's largest migrant reception and training centres. Between June 1949 and January 1960 as part of the post-war immigration to Australia, over 100,000 new migrants seeking a new life in Australia passed through the camp. The first group of 600 migrants arrived 7 June 1949 from the Bathurst Migrant Reception and Training Centre and were followed on 19 August 1949 by migrants who travelled directly by disembarking from the Fairsea at Newcastle and who arrived at Greta via the railway. In total, about 100,000 migrants from various countries, including Austria, Bulgaria, Czechoslovakia, Estonia, Germany, Greece, Hungary, Italy, Latvia, Lithuania, Macedonia, Netherlands, Poland, Romania, Russia, Ukraine and Yugoslavia, sprent time in the camp.

Men were required to sign a two-year work contract and were housed at "Chocolate City" when they were not away at jobsites, such as cutting sugar cane in Queensland, steelworks, the railways, or the Snowy Mountains Scheme. Women and children were housed at the holding centre in "Silver City".

One notable new Australian to come through the camp was Tatjana Hitrina. She was part of an event organized by Mrs. Rene Dooley, the camp entertainment officer. Hitrina and others sang songs and did performances at the event which was held at the Methodist Memorial Hall in Maitland in late October 1950.

The migrant camp closed in 1960, and the Army occasionally used the site for training exercises until it was sold at auction in 1980.
