= Umberto Clerici =

Italian cellist and conductor (born 1981)

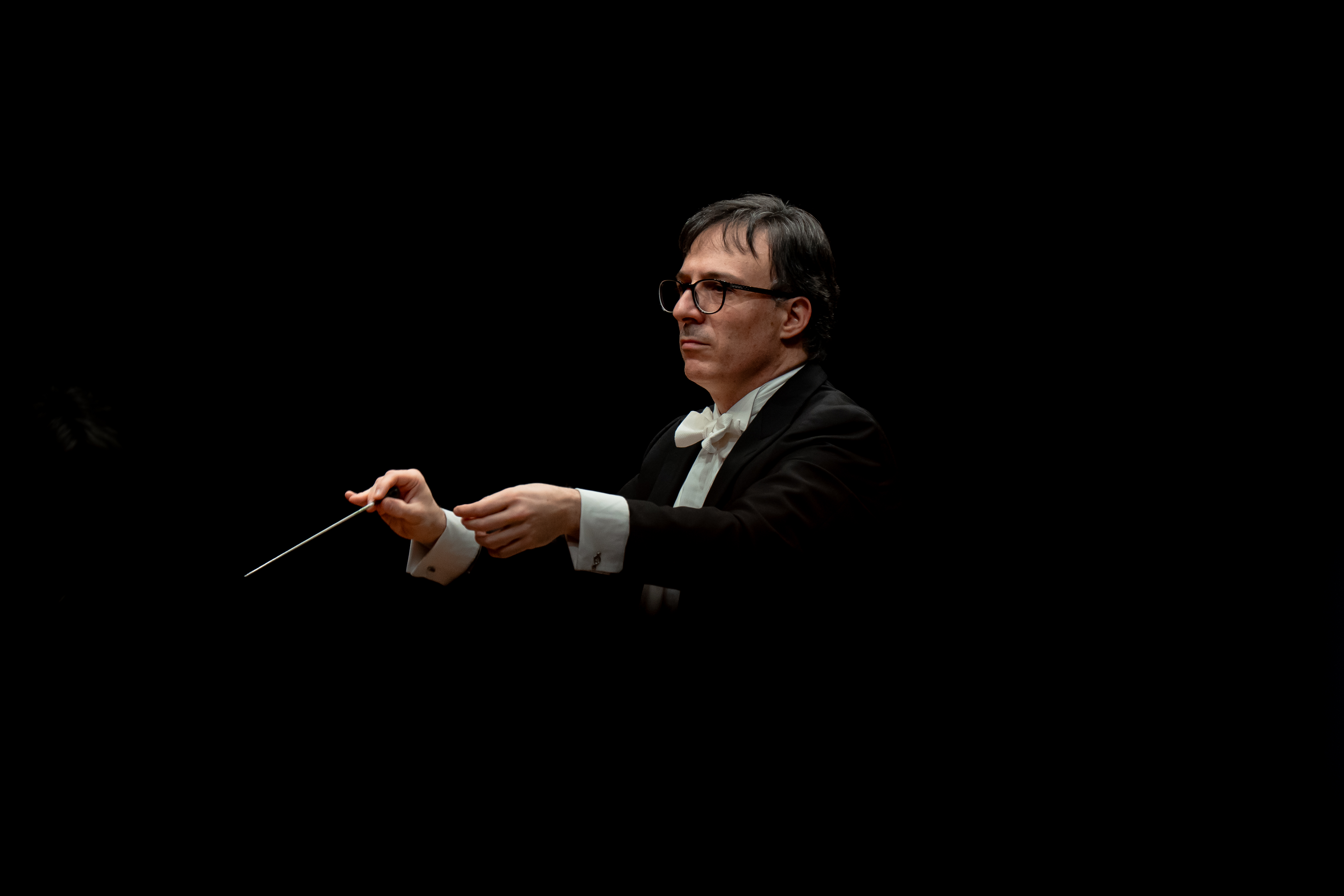

Background information
- Born: 29 May 1981 (age 45)

Umberto Clerici (born 29 May 1981) is an Italian classical cellist and conductor. He was appointed chief conductor of the Queensland Symphony Orchestra in 2023.

== Career ==
Born in Turin, Italy, into a family of lawyers and judges, Clerici started cello studies at the age of five in the Suzuki method. He studied at the Turin Conservatory in his home town from 1994, graduating in 2000. He then earned a diploma from the Hochschule für Musik in Nuremberg where he studied with Julius Berger from 2005 to 2008. Clerici won awards in the Janigro Competition in Zagreb, the Rostropovich Competition in Paris, the Tchaikovsky Competition in Moscow, and the National Association I.C.O. competition in Rome. He performed with many Italian and a number of international orchestras in Russia, Austria, the United Kingdom and Turkey. Clerici has played in concert halls like Carnegie Hall in New York, Musikverein in Vienna, Wigmore Hall in London, Shostakovich Hall in Saint Petersburg, the Parco della Musica in Rome, and at the Salzburg Festival. He also performs chamber music with pianist Claudio Martínez Mehner, Kathryn Selby, and others.

At the invitation of Gianandrea Noseda, then music director at the Teatro Regio in his home town, Clerici became principal cello from 2009 to 2014 at that opera house. At the same time, he was guest principal at the Filarmonica della Scala, Milan. In 2014, he was appointed principal cello of the Sydney Symphony Orchestra (SSO). In Sydney, he met his future wife, lawyer, now federal judge, and a patron of the SSO, Sophie Given. He teaches cello at the Sydney Conservatorium and in summer courses at Mozarteum University Salzburg.

Clerici conducted his first concert with a community orchestra, the Woollahra Philharmonic, and had some conducting lessons at the Sydney Conservatorium with Eduardo Diazmuñoz and Richard Gill. In 2018, he conducted the SSO at a commercial engagement at a law convention, followed by a regional tour and concerts with other state orchestras. When concerts were cancelled during the Covid lockdowns, Clerici studied scores, and when Scottish conductor Donald Runnicles could not travel to Sydney to conduct Mahler's fourth symphony, Clerici offered and received the job. Since then, he has conducted the İzmir and Istanbul State Orchestras, the Melbourne Symphony Orchestra, the West Australian, Tasmanian, Adelaide, New Zealand, Christchurch, Dunedin symphony orchestras. He was appointed chief conductor of the Queensland Symphony Orchestra in 2023.

Clerici plays cellos by Matteo Goffriller (1722, Venice) and by Carlo Antonio Testore (1758, Milan).
