= Ladislav Slovák =

Slovak conductor (1919–1999)

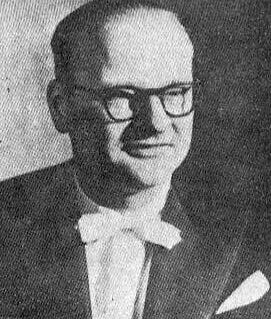
- Slovák in 1958

Background information
- Born: 10 September 1919; Veľké Leváre, Czechoslovakia
- Died: 22 July 1999 (aged 79); Bratislava, Slovakia
- Genres: Classical
- Occupation: Conductor

Ladislav Slovák (10 September 1919, Veľké Leváre – 22 July 1999, Bratislava) was a Slovak conductor.

He was a long-time director of the Slovak Philharmonic, taking over the job from his teacher and mentor Václav Talich. Amongst his most important recordings is the entire collection of Dmitri Shostakovich's fifteen symphonies with Slovak Radio Symphony Orchestra, published by Naxos Records. He studied in Leningrad under the Russian conductor Yevgeny Mravinsky, and met Shostakovich while participating in rehearsals of his music. From 1990 until 1995, Slovák recorded all twelve symphonies by Alexander Moyzes for the Marco Polo label of Naxos Records. These recordings were re-released between 2018 and 2019 on the Naxos label.

Slovák's daughter, Kamila Magálová, is one of Slovakia's best-known theatre actresses and a member of the Slovak National Theatre. His son Marián Slovák is also an actor.

Cultural offices
Preceded by Václav Smetáček	Music Director, Prague Symphony Orchestra; 1972–1976	Succeeded by Jindřich Rohan
