= Donald Britton (musician) =

English-born, Australian musician, composer and teacher (1919–2016)

Donald Britton OAM (2 November 1919 – 7 June 2016) was an English-born, Australian musician, composer and teacher. He was a pianist and organist, and accompanist.

For his services to music and to music education, Donald Britton was awarded an OAM (Medal of the Order of Australia in the General Division) in the 1995 Queen's Birthday Honours. In addition to the award of OAM, his academic and music qualifications included MA, MusB (Cantab), ARCM, and ARCO.

== Early years ==
Britton began accompanying at a very early age (primary school) due to his excellent sight reading skills.

For the duration of his tertiary studies, Britton's musical skills saw him appointed Organ Scholar at Emmanuel College, Cambridge University.

Britton completed six years of wartime service in the British Army during which time, he later recalled, he saw or played on an instrument only four times.

After the war, Britton taught French and Spanish, and worked as an organist and choir master, at Winchester College.

== Australia ==
Britton was born in the UK and immigrated to Australia in 1954 to become the first Director of Music at Melbourne Grammar School. He held this position for twenty years (1954–1973), having been appointed by Headmaster, Sir Brian Hone.

Britton was held in high esteem as the Melbourne Grammar School's choirmaster and organist, and recorded the album, Donald Britton plays Organ Music by British French and German Composers with W&G Records (WG-AL-661) on the school's organ in 1958. Other responsibilities at Melbourne Grammar School included teaching piano and organ, and conducting ensembles.

During his time in Melbourne, Britton's piano students included Australian pianists, Leslie Howard, Ian Holtham, and David Selig

In 1974, Britton moved to Queensland where he was coordinator of instrumental music for the Queensland Department of Education, examined for the Australian Music Examinations Board (AMEB), and performed as a pianist and associate artist.

His compositions include liturgical works and children's pieces.

Britton was a Life Member of the Accompanists Guild of Queensland, Inc., and his reflection on life as an accompanist is published on the guild's website.

Britton's children include author Valerie Britton-Wilson (Valerie Wilson) who recently published a memoir titled A Touch of India which provides detail on some of her father's life events.
