= Prague Symphony Orchestra =

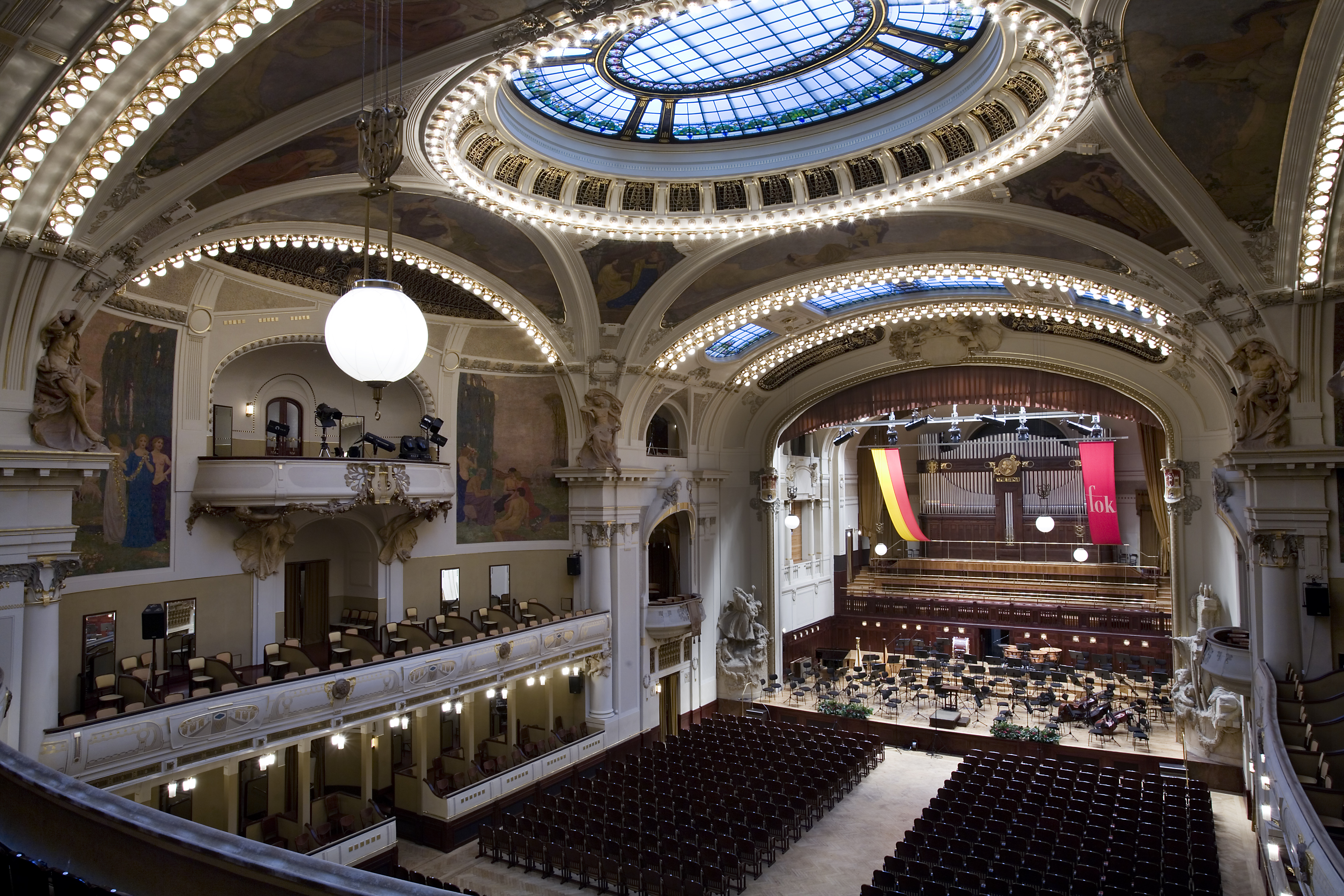
Prague Symphony Orchestra frequently performs concerts in the Smetana Hall at the Municipal House in Prague

The Prague Symphony Orchestra (Czech: Symfonický orchestr hlavního města Prahy FOK) is a Czech orchestra based in Prague. The orchestra has traditionally been known by the acronym 'FOK', standing for 'Film-Opera-Koncert', reflecting the orchestra's fields of activity as envisioned by its founder. When the city of Prague made the orchestra its official concert ensemble in 1952, it retained the acronym, giving it the official title 'Symphony Orchestra of the Capital City of Prague – FOK'.

== History ==
Rudolf Pekárek founded the orchestra in 1934. In the 1930s the orchestra performed the scores for many Czech films, and also appeared regularly on Czech radio. An early promoter of the orchestra was Václav Smetáček, who became the orchestra's chief conductor in 1942, and held the post for the next 30 years. In 1942 the orchestra was merged with the German Operetta Theatre in Prague and in 1944 disbanded and its members sent to work in factories producing war materials.

After Smetáček's departure from the post of chief conductor, artistic leadership was taken over in succession by Ladislav Slovák (1972–1976), Jindřich Rohan (1976–1977), and then Jiří Bělohlávek (1977–1989), whose work marked an important stage from the standpoint of the ensemble's intensive artistic development. After Bělohlávek came Petr Altrichter (1990–1992), Martin Turnovský (1992–1995), and Gaetano Delogu (1995–1998). Other important Czech conductors who have worked with the orchestra for an extensive time include Václav Neumann, Zdeněk Košler, and Vladimír Válek. From March 2001 to the end of the 2005/2006 concert season, the Chief Conductor and music director of the orchestra was Serge Baudo. Since the 2006/2007 concert season, Jiří Kout has held the position of Chief Conductor, whilst Serge Baudo is the honorary Conductor. In 2015/2016–2019/2020 Pietari Inkinen was Chief Conductor. Tomáš Brauner assumed the role of Chief Conductor of the Prague Symphony Orchestra in September 2020.

The orchestra began international touring in 1948, and also built its reputation and respect by engaging internationally-recognized conductors such as Georg Solti, Seiji Ozawa, Zubin Mehta, Charles Mackerras, Gennady Rozhdestvensky and Helmuth Rilling and top soloists.

== Chief conductors ==
- Rudolf Pekárek (1934-1942)
- Václav Smetáček (1942–1972)
- Ladislav Slovák (1972–1976)
- Jindřich Rohan (1976–1977)
- Jiří Bělohlávek (1977–1989)
- Petr Altrichter (1990–1992)
- Martin Turnovský (1992–1995)
- Gaetano Delogu (1995–1998)
- Serge Baudo (2001–2006)
- Jiří Kout (2006–2013)
- Muhai Tang (2013-2014)
- Pietari Inkinen (2015–2020)
- Tomáš Brauner (2020–2025)
- Tomáš Netopil (2025–present)

== Contribution in rock crossover projects ==
Since 1995 the orchestra has been part of several crossover projects, which aim to mix metal and classical music together. The most important are:

- The Lingua Mortis album by Rage in 1996
- The Lemuria and Sirius B albums by Therion in 2004
- The Gettysburg (1863) trilogy on The Glorious Burden album by Iced Earth in 2004
- Several songs and The Keepers Trilogy on the Unarmed album by Helloween in 2010
