= Horace Keats =

Composer and accompanist (1895–1945)

Horace Stanley Keats (20 July 1895 – 21 August 1945) was an English-born Australian composer, arranger, piano accompanist and conductor. As a composer he was most noted for his 115 songs, which caused an Australian academic to dub him "the Schubert of Australia" and others to call him "the poets' composer". He also wrote ballet music, film scores, choral works, incidental music and a musical.

== Career ==
Horace Keats was born in Mitcham, now in London, England but then part of Surrey, in 1895. He ran away to sea at age 13, and worked as a ship's pianist, having had only very few lessons as a child. He tried to enlist at the outbreak of World War I but was rejected for poor eyesight. He was accompanist for Nella Webb on her tour of America and the Pacific, and in 1915 settled in Sydney, Australia, having been persuaded by Peter Dawson, Ella Caspers and others to become their regular accompanist.

In 1917 he toured Australia and New Zealand providing the music for several films by D. W. Griffith. He was a conductor and orchestral pianist for several operas directed by Count Ercole Filippini.

He led a trio in the restaurant of Farmers department store 1920–1923. The other members were John Farnsworth Hall and John Boatwright. Farmers founded the radio station 2FC in 1923, and Keats was a frequent broadcaster as conductor of its 17-member ensemble (which would later evolve into the Sydney Symphony Orchestra), and piano accompanist. From 1925 he worked for radio station 2BL.

In 1930 he went to England to work for the BBC, but returned after six months due to ill health. In 1932 in Perth, he joined the fledgling Australian Broadcasting Commission as Controller of Wireless Programmes, but was dismissed in 1933. He then worked as a freelance accompanist in Sydney, often with the ABC (which had taken over 2FC), an association that continued until his death in Sydney at age 50 in 1945, from a cerebral haemorrhage.

He was survived by his wife, Janet leBrun Brown (1900–1985), who, as Barbara Russell, was the principal performer of his songs; a young son, Brennan, and a daughter. An elder son, Russell, a flautist and organist, had been killed on active service on board HMAS Canberra on 9 August 1942 near Guadalcanal. Horace Keats wrote the song "Over the Quiet Waters" in his son's memory.

Janet Keats was later briefly married to Hugh McCrae, a poet whose words Horace Keats had set to music.

== Compositions ==
Most of Keats' compositions date from after his return to Australia in 1932, having been encouraged by composer and pianist Frank Hutchens. The poets whose words he set in song included William Blake, Christopher Brennan, Lord Byron, John Drinkwater, Gerard Manley Hopkins, Hugh McCrae, Kenneth Mackenzie, Shaw Neilson, John Cowper Powys, Christina Rossetti and Oscar Wilde. His best-known song is "She Walks in Beauty" (1939), to words by Byron. Although Keats did not have the opportunity of meeting Christopher Brennan before the latter's death in 1932, the executors of Brennan's estate granted Keats the exclusive right to set his poems to music during Keats' lifetime.

His film scores included two directed by Ken G. Hall: Lovers and Luggers (1937) (aka Vengeance of the Deep) and The Vagabond Violinist (1938; aka The Broken Melody; which also had music by Alfred Hill, and in which future Prime Minister Gough Whitlam had a brief wordless part as a man in a nightclub).

He composed a setting for baritone and orchestra of John Keats's "La Belle Dame sans Merci" for baritone Harold Williams, and a musical called Atsomari.

Keats was the only Australian composer to write using the whole tone scale during that period.

Many of Horace Keats works have been published. There has been a string of recordings, from Peter Dawson and Harold Williams in the 1920s, to Lauris Elms with Gordon Watson in the 1970s, through to 21st century releases by the ABC.

== Legacy ==
A biography by his son Brennan Keats OAM, A Poet's Composer (1997), is available online. He is an organist and accompanist, as well as a publisher of contemporary composers' works.

A triple portrait of Horace Keats, his wife and Christopher Brennan, titled Mr and Mrs Horace Keats in the "Christopher Brennan Cycle", is on display at the National Portrait Gallery, Canberra. It was painted by Dora Toovey, a noted portraitist who was a finalist in the Archibald Prize 34 times, but never won it. It was painted six weeks after Keats' death, and 13 years after Brennan's death.

The "Horace Keats Memorial Prize for Composition" is awarded by the Sydney Conservatorium of Music via a legacy of the Keats family.

Keats is commemorated in Keats Place in the Canberra suburb of Melba.
