= 1995 Queen's Birthday Honours (Australia) =

The 1995 Queen's Birthday Honours for Australia were announced on Monday 12 June 1995 by the office of the Governor-General.

The Birthday Honours were appointments by some of the 16 Commonwealth realms of Queen Elizabeth II to various orders and honours to reward and highlight good works by citizens of those countries. The Birthday Honours are awarded as part of the Queen's Official Birthday celebrations during the month of June.

== Order of Australia ==
=== Companion (AC) ===
==== General Division ====
Recipient	Citation	Notes
His Excellency The Honourable Dr Neal Blewett	For service to the Australian parliament, the development and implementation of public policy, particularly national AIDS policy and for scholarship	
The Honourable Elizabeth Andreas Evatt, AO	For service to the law, social justice and to the promotion of human rights worldwide, particularly in the areas of equal opportunity and anti-discrimination legislation and practice	

==== Military Division ====
Branch	Recipient	Citation	Notes
Army	Lieutenant General John Cedric Grey, AO	For outstanding leadership, inspiration and dedication to the Australian Army, particularly as Chief of the General Staff during a period of profound restructuring of the Australian Army	

=== Officer (AO) ===
==== General Division ====
Recipient	Citation	Notes
Professor Denise Irene Bradley	For service to education and to educational policy in schools and universities, particularly in relation to access and equity for women and girls	
Father Frank Tenison Brennan	For to Aboriginal Australians, particularly as an advocate in the areas of law, social justice and reconciliation	
Brian Edwin Burdekin	For service to the community as Human Rights Commissioner and for the promotion and protection of social justice and human rights in other countries	
John Dowling Coates, AM	For service to the advancement of sport and the Olympic movement	
Professor Alexander Kevin Cohen	For service to medicine, particularly in the field of endocrinology, to the arts and to the community	
Eva Maria Cox	For service to women's welfare	
Allison Winning Dickson, OAM	For service to higher education as Chancellor of the University of Southern Queensland and to the community	
Erik Franz Ferdinand Finger	For service to engineering and for public service, particularly in the area of economic trade and investment development in Queensland	
Alexander Christy Freeleagus, CBE AM	For service to the community, particularly to the welfare of the Greek community in Queensland and to the ex-service community	
Janet Lee Holmes à Court	For service to business the arts and the community	
Dr Diana Glen Horvath	For service to health administration and to medicine particularly through advancing medical teaching and medical research	
Richard George Humphry	For service to public administration and to business	
Emeritus Professor Kenneth Richard McKinnon	For service to education, to the community and to the arts	
Robert Edward Patrick McMillan	For service to marine environment conservation and to structural engineering	
Gavin Geoffrey Souter, AM	For service to Australian historical literature	
Gregory Frank Taylor	For public service and to the development of economic and social policy	
Professor Geoffrey Donald Thorburn	For service to medicine and to research in the field of fetal physiology	
Stanley David Martin Wallis	For service to the manufacturing industry, to commerce and to the community	
Professor Ian William Webster	For service to community medicine and to public health	
Nancy Mary Weir	For service to music and to music education	

==== Military Division ====
Branch	Recipient	Citation	Notes
Navy	Rear Admiral Peter Terence Purcell	For exemplary service to the Royal Australian Navy, particularly as the Director General of Naval Production	
Army	Major General James Michael Connolly, AM	For service to the Australian Army and the Australian Defence Force, particularly in the fields of personnel and operations	
Army	Major General David Glen Rossi	For distinguished service to the Australian Army and the Australian Defence Force in the field of health services	

=== Member (AM) ===
==== General Division ====
Recipient	Citation	Notes
Elsie June Allen	For service to the health care and to the advancement of nursing standards	
Ronald Graham Archer	For service to the community, cricket and business	
The Reverend Canon Stuart Barton Babbage	For service to the Anglican Church of Australia to education and to the community	
Marjorie Baldwin Jones	For service to the establishment of Aboriginal Health resources in rural and remote communities, particularly in the fields of ophthalmology and obstetrics	
Lyndal McAlpin Barlin	For service to the parliamentary practices and procedures	
Professor David Campbell Barr	For service to education	
Kevin Wayne Bawden	For service to people with physical disabilities, particularly as President of the Wheelchair Sports Association of South Australia	
Roger David Bernard Beale	For service to public sector policy development, particularly micro-economic reform	
George Henry Bennett	For service to local government	
Geoffrey James Betts, MBE	For service to the community, commerce and to the welfare of members of the Defence Force	
Edward Walter Ayling Butcher	For service to transport	
Elizabeth Anne Byrne Henderson	For service to the community and women's health	
Dr Francis Norman Carrick	For service to wildlife preservation, particularly in relation to koalas	
John Forrest Haymen Clark	For service to industry and commerce	
Ann Dennis Clark	For service to education, particularly as Executive Director of Catholic Schools in the Parramatta Diocese	
Judith Anne Cornell	For service to nursing, particularly to the quality of nursing practice and education	
Arthur Bryce Courtenay	For service to advertising and marketing to the community and as an author	
Professor Michael John Cousins	For service to medicine, particularly in the fields of pain management and anaesthesia	
Jeanette Adelaide Covacevich	For service to science, particularly in the field of herpetology and to conservation	
Helen Kaye Dening-Ledgerwood	For service to the building industry	
The Honourable Nicholas Manuel Dondas	For service to Government and politics and to the Northern Territory Legislative Assembly	
Dr Michael Drake	For service to medicine, particularly in the field of cytopathology and cervical cancer screening	
Professor Henry Ekert	For service to medicine, particularly in the fields of paediatric haematology and oncology	
Leonard George Fletcher	For service to health administration	
Professor David Edward Flint	For service to the print media, particularly as Chairman of the Australian Press Council and to international relations	
Malcolm Leslie Germein	For service to local government and to the community	
Professor William Peter Rea Gibson	For service to medicine, particularly in the field of otology	
Neil Ellis Gilbert	For service to community health	
Pamela Ann Gullifer	For service to art gallery administration	
Michael Stephen Desmond Hanlon	For service to industry development	
Frazer Earl Henry	For service to industry and economic development in the Northern Territory, particularly in the fields of engineering and transport	
Dr Luise Anna Hercus	For service to education and linguistics particularly through the preservation of Aboriginal languages and culture	
Jacqueline Hick	For service to art as an artist and teacher	
Alan Gardner Kerr	For public service and for service to the Norfolk Island community	
Yvonne Muriel Renee McComb King, OBE	For service to the community	
Superintendent William Trevor Kirk	For service to international relations, particularly through United Nations police operations	
Grahame Barratt Latham	For service to the hospitality industry, particularly as head of the Regency Hotel School in South Australia	
Emeritus Professor Douglas Harry Kedgwin Lee	For service to research in physiological medicine, particularly in the field of metabolic change due to environmental heat stress	
His Excellency Michael David Lightowler	For service to the development of the Australian trade policy and bilateral trade relations	
Professor Anthony William Linnane	For service to medicine, particularly in the fields of biochemistry and molecular biology	
Professor Peter James McDonald	For service to medicine, particularly in the fields of infections diseases and microbiology	
The Venerable Marjorie McGregor	For service to the Anglican Church and to the community through the development of parish outreach programs	
Frances Margaret McGuire	For service to the community and to literature, particularly through the State Library of South Australia	
David Graham Miller	For service to music, particularly as a piano accompanist	
Lola Mary Miller, BEM	For service to the community, particularly through the Anne Caudle Centre	
Dr David Brian Millons	For service to medicine, particularly as head of the amputee unit at Royal Prince Alfred Hospital	
Peter Morton Moyes, OBE	For service to education, particularly through the Anglican Schools' Commission	
Dr John Henry Muller	For service to dentistry and to the community	
Cecil Frank Munns	For service to education	
Emeritus Professor Gerald Francis Murnaghan	For service to medicine, particularly in the field of urological surgery	
Dr Anthony Constantine Michael Paul, OAM	For service to medicine, particularly through the Flying Surgeon Service	
Ian Philp Pearce	For service to jazz music	
Dorothy Ruth Pizzey	For service to education	
Newell James Platten	For service to architecture and to town planning and investment development in Queensland	
Roger Glenn Pysden	For service to industry, particularly in the building material sector	
Professor Neville David Quarry	For service to architecture	
Dr William Stanley Ramson	For service to the study of Australian language and the establishment of the Australian National Dictionary Centre	
Peter Brummell Rath	For public service, particularly through the New South Wales Fire Brigades	
Richard Michael Redom	For service to community health, particularly in the field of mental health	
Gabor Reeves	For service to music as a clarinettist and as an educator	
Wenten Rubuntja	For service to Aboriginal people, particularly in Central Australia	
Maxwell John Salveson	For service to the community, particularly through the Salvation Army Red Shield Appeal	
Henry (Maurice) Saxby	For service to children's literature	
Dr George Mor Selby	For service to medicine, particularly in the field of neurology	
David John Ross Sommerlad	For service to the print media, particularly through the Country Press organisations of Australia and New South Wales, and to the community	
Richard Robert Setton Stone	For service to the beef cattle industry	
Christopher Stephen Strong	For service to education	
Marina Swanson	For service to business, particularly through the Australian Institute of Export	
His Excellency Allan Robert Taylor	For service to international relations	
Ronald Walter Thomson	For service to electrical engineering	
Raymond Henry Campbell Turner	For service to the finance industry and to the community	
Max Edward Walker	For service to the building industry in Australia and internationally through the World Organisation of Building Officials	
Neville John Walker	For service to industry and economic development in the Northern Territory, particularly in the fields of engineering and transport	
Donald Wall	For service to the recorded history of World War II, particularly the history of the 8th Division and the fate of prisoners of war at Sandakan, Northern Borneo	
Michael Irvine Wansley	For service to the community through the Australian Red Cross and the International Federation of Red Cross and Red Crescent Societies	
Graham Douglas Stewart Webster	For service to the broadcasting media and to the community	
Kenneth Campbell Webster	For public service in Western Australia, particularly the administration of water supplies	
David George Wilcox	For service to the environment, particularly as a rangelands scientist	
Dr James Hamlyn Willis	For service to botany, particularly in the field of Australian flora	
Norman Francis Wilson	For service to people with visual and hearing impairments, particularly through the development of a machine to convert Braille into print	
Edward Owen Delpratt Wright	For service to the beef cattle industry	

==== Military Division ====
Branch	Recipient	Citation	Notes
Navy	Rear Admiral Murray Bruce Forrest	For service to the Royal Australian Navy, particularly as Chief of Staff Naval Support Command	
Navy	Warrant Officer David Thomas Strangward	For exceptional service to the Royal Australian Navy and dedicated performance of duty and exceptional professionalism throughout employment within the Submarine Arm	
Navy	Captain Kenneth Victor Taylor	For outstanding service to the Royal Australian Navy and the Royal Navy Reserve Force, particularly in facilitating integration of the two into a total combined force	
Army	Lieutenant Colonel Stuart John Ellis	In recognition of service to the Australian Army, particularly in the field of operations at Land Headquarters, Headquarters Special Forces and especially as Commander of the United Nations Operations in Somalia	
Army	Colonel Michael John George	For exceptional service to the Australian Army, particularly in the field of Army Reserve Training	
Army	Colonel Eric Joseph Hanger	For outstanding service to the Australian Army, particularly as the Commanding Officer Base Administrative Support Centre Enoggera	
Army	Colonel Peter Francis Leahy	For exceptional service to the Australian Army, particularly in regimental and staff appointments and especially as the Director of Army Research and Analysis	
Army	Lieutenant Colonel Wayne Paul Ramsey, CSC	For exceptional service to the Australian Defence Force, particularly as the Commander Land Command Health Services and as the first Commander Australian Contingent to the United Nations Mission in Rwanda	
Air Force	Principal Air Chaplain Rodger Howard Boerth	For service to the Royal Australian Air Force Chaplaincy Branch, particularly as a trustee of the RAAF Welfare Trust Fund	
Air Force	Wing Commander Jeffrey Michael Bugden	For service to the Royal Australian Air Force in the field of avionics maintenance Squadron, Amberley	
Air Force	Group Captain Richard Peter Hedges	For exceptional service to the Royal Australian Air Force, particularly as the Director of the Air Force Commercial Support Program	
Air Force	Squadron Leader George Kolliios	For exceptional service to the Royal Australian Air Force as Operations Officer and Executive Officer at No 33 Squadron	
Air Force	Air Commodore Elliott MacLeod Weller	For exceptional service to the Royal Australian Air Force, particularly in the field of engineering policy and logistics systems	

=== Medal (OAM) ===
==== General Division ====
Recipient	Citation	Notes
Diane A'Beckett	For services to the Community, particularly through the Girl Guides Association	
Keith Roy Adams	For service to local government administration and to the community	
Robert Neville Alderslade	For services to the band music	
Dr Joseph Ernest Aldred	For services to the public service in Victoria	
Margaret Ann Angove	For service to the sport of netball, particularly in the development of coaches and coaching programmes	
Brierley Bailey	For service to the Australian Ju-Jitsu Association	
John Paterson Bailey	For service to the community and to the welfare of veterans	
George Ballas	For service to the Greek community and to the Geelong Ethnic Communities Council	
Martha Margaret Zsuzsanna Barany, BEM	For service to the Hungarian community	
Nanette Barbour	For service to the aged and to people with disabilities through the Horticultural Therapy Society of New South Wales	
Donald Alexander Barnett	For service to conservation, particularly as founder of the Hunter Region Botanic Gardens	
Mervyn Henry Norman Beitz	For service to the community, particularly through local history research	
Aldred Ivy Bell	For service to the United Hospital Auxiliaries of New South Wales and to the community	
Commander Anthony John Todd Bennett	For service to the community	
Noel Bertie Beswick	For service to people with disabilities through the provision of employment, training and residential services	
Maurice Alfred Bevington	For service to the community, particularly through Lifeline	
Constance Ada Eldwyne Bleeze	For service to the community, particularly through Meals on Wheels and the Nurses Memorial Foundation of South Australia	
Donald Wallace Bletchly	For service to the plywood and timber industry and to the 15th Battalion Australian Military Forces Association	
George Arthur Bond	For service to people with visual impairments, particularly through the Association for the Blind	
Bette June Boyanton	For service to the community	
William Brace, BEM	For service to veterans, particularly the Returned and Services League Southern Eastern District of Queensland	
Richard Brady	For service to veterans, particularly through 'Carry on' Victoria	
Fiona Elizabeth MacDonald Brand	For service to conservation and the environment through the National Parks Association of the Australian Capital Territory	
Donald Britton	For service to music and music education	
Stanley Marcel William Brogden	For service to aviation journalism	
Pauline Anderson Ellison Brooks	For service to community health and fitness, particularly through the Arthritis Foundation of South Australia	
Robin Wallace Brown	For service to journalism	
Doris Mary Bruce	For service to the community	
Madeleine Ruby Irene Brunato-Arthur	For service to Australian writers, particularly through the Fellowship of Australian Writers in South Australia	
Peter Barry Buckmaster	For service to the rural community of the Australian Capital Territory	
Malcolm James Bugg	For service to the welfare of veterans and to the community	
Joan Case	For service to the community	
William James Alexander Chalmers	For services to the community through the Scout Association and the Queensland Ambulance Service	
John Stanley Chaplin	For service to the community and to people with physical and intellectual disabilities, particularly through the Flagstaff Group Employment Service	
Julia Christina Charlesworth	For service to the community	
Brian Edmund Chong Wee	For service to the aged	
Nicola Cirocco	For service to the South Australian Bocce Federation and to the Italian community	
Helen Mary Clark	For service to the community, particularly through the Canberra Blind Society and the YWCA	
Dennis Antill Cowdroy	For service to the Returned and Services League of Australia, to the community and to the practice of law	
Caroline Mary Robinette Cromarty	For service to the community	
Dr Mervyn John Cross	For service to orthopaedic and sports medicine	
Dorothy Maurene Crouch	For service to swimming as a teacher and coach	
Phillip Samuel Curry, MC	For service to veterans through the 2/33rd battalion Association and to the community	
Cora Emily Daly	For service to aged people, Meals on Wheels and the community	
Bruce Davidson	For service to the community, particularly through St Luke's Anglican Church and the Luke's Association	
His Honour Judge Colin Peart Davidson	For service to the Australia Day Regatta Committee	
Betty Mereworth Davy	For service to the community	
Charles Pearson Daws	For service to the community and local government	
Olga Edith Daws	For service to the community	
Captain Peter William John Dawson	For service to the community, particularly through the Royal Volunteer Coastal Patrol	
Carol Margaret Day	For service to the Western Australian Youth Orchestra Association	
Esther Charlotte Deans	For service to the aged and disabled	
Ada Florence Devereaux	For service to the aged in the Pullenvale and Kenmore areas	
Mollie Adeline Dinham	For service to education and to the teaching of aeronautics	
Phillip William Dodds	For service to the community	
Henry Victor Drew	For service to the community, particularly through the fundraising project 'Cans for Kids'	
Robert Dunlop	For service to cabinet making and woodcarving and to the community	
Eric Leonard Dunn	For service to the practise of property valuation and to the community	
Timothy John Gerard Dwyer	For service to showjumping and equestrian events nationally and internationally	
Councillor Kevin Joseph Hibberson Dwyer	For service to local government and to the community	
Jean Marjorie Edgecombe	For service to conservation and the environment and to the Australian Red Cross Society	
The Reverend Campbell Edward John Egan	For service to the aged and to the Presbyterian Church of Australia and the Uniting Church in Australia	
Bernard Marie-Joseph Elias	For service to the Australian Embassy, Paris as senior Protocol Officer	
Ena Joan Elliott	For service to the community, particularly through parents and citizen's organisations	
Dr Malvin Leonard Eutick	For service to biotechnology	
Kenneth McRobert Evans	For service to mathematics education and to the community	
Elido Fachin	For service to the aged	
Patricia Fagan	For service to cultural educational and community organisations	
Charles Graham Francis	For service to the community and to local government	
James Albert Frazier	For service to wildlife cinematography	
Kathleen Mary Gibson	For service to the community and to veterans	
Dr Lionel Arthur James Gilbert	For service to the community as a researcher and curator of local history in the New England region	
Lynette Laura Gillam	For service to the community through the organisation, 'Compassionate Friends'	
Claire Alberta Gledhill	For service to the community	
Michael John Gloster	For service to conservation and the environment	
Ross Roy Goode	For service to the welfare of prisoners and ex-prisoners and to the rehabilitation of alcoholics and drug addicts	
Georgina Mary Gough	For service to health and fitness and to music	
Winifred Emma Graham	For service to the community through providing support to patients and their families at the Women's and Children's Hospital, Adelaide	
Colleen Mary Stella Green	For service to local government and to the community	
Kyrra Grunnsund	For service to people with disabilities, particularly through sport	
Erika Inge Haas	For service to community music, particularly as a fund raiser	
Kenneth Lindsay Hall	For service to badminton	
Kenneth Maxwell Hall	For service to the legal profession	
John Vincent Hancock	For service to people with disabilities, particularly through the Riding for the Disabled Association of Australia	
Francis Thomas (Bill) Hanley	For service to the development of the Queensland Irish Association	
Rosemary Helen Harding	For service to aged people, particularly through the Gold Coast Alzheimers Association	
Valma Joyce Hardman	For service to the performing arts and to the community	
Kenneth Francis Harvie	For service to the Sri Lankan community	
Robert Ho	For service to the community, particularly the Chinese community associations and to business	
Philip Kenneth Hockney	For service to the road transport industry	
Kevin Patrick Hogan	For service to the community	
Brian Sydney Hollingsworth	For service to water safety education	
Clifford Houghton, EM	For service to veterans	
Ena (Dorothy) Hulme-Moir	For service to the Mothers' Union and to the Anglican Church	
Terrence John Imrie	For service to surf lifesaving	
Councillor Antoine (Tony) Issa	For service to local government and to the Lebanese community	
William George Jenkins	For service to veterans	
Margaret Eva Johnston	For service to youth particularly through the Girls Brigade	
Edward Joseph Jowett	For service to veterans	
Eric Stanley Jupp	For service to music	
Aileen Kadison	For service to the welfare of children and families in crisis	
Warren Davenport Keats	For service to the community through preserving the maritime history of the Tweed Heads area, particularly as Chairman of the Centaur Commemoration Committee	
Patricia Catherine Keill	For service to rural women particularly through the Country Women's Association	
Peter David Kempster	For service to music, particularly as an instrument maker	
Dympna Paredes Escober Kimmorley	For service to the Filipino community	
William Barre King	For service to veterans and to the community	
Maureen Hyne Kingston	For service to the community particularly through the Association of Independent Retirees	
Andrew Kleeberg	For service to the community and to Polish veterans	
Herbert Knowles	For service to veterans and to the community	
Daniela Cecylia Kowalczuk	For service to the Polish community, particularly aged people	
Jaakko Sakari Laajoki	For service to the Finnish community	
Wasyl Labaz	For service to the Ukrainian community	
Isabelle Ferguson Lee	For service to the Australian Red Cross and to the community	
Hazel May Lee	For service to community arts organisations	
Dulcie Emily Martha Lenton	For service to the arts, particularly music and drama	
Maria Anna Maryla Leweczko	For service to the Polish community	
Glen Arthur Lewis	For service to the community	
Stanley Clifford Lohse	For service to the community to local government and to the building industry	
Ronald James Lynch	For service to the community, to agriculture and to the bushfire service	
John Richard Mackay	For service to the community	
Gwen Mackey	For service to the arts as a teacher of dance	
Jean Fletcher Omand MacLaren	For service to nursing	
Barbara Anne Madew	For service to the community, particularly through the YMCA	
Francis Fabian Maher	For service to the community	
John Vincent Maley	For service to local government and to the community	
Ronald William Mallett	For service to the community through the teaching of music	
Gwenda Alison Susan Martin	For service to children, youth and aged people through the People's Junior League and the Allspots Hospital Entertainers	
Derek Edward Martin	For service to the Scout Association of Australia, Western Australia Branch	
Kevin Ronald Peter Maskell	For service to the community	
David Claude McCarthy	For service to photography	
Valerie Rodeena McDermott	For service to the community, particularly as a fundraiser for charity	
Dr Lorna Lorraine McDonald	For service to the Rockhampton and District Historical Society and to historical research	
Father Kevin Bartholomew McKelson	For service to the Aboriginal community	
Frank McNamara	For service to art, particularly as a watercolour artist	
Juris (George) Mellens	For service to the Latvian community	
Dennis Lionel Merchant	For service to the advertising industry and to the community	
Elaine Doreen Miller	For service to local government and to the community	
Clarence Vincent Millington	For service to the community	
Jerzy Stanislaw Misiak	For service to veterans through the Polish Ex-Servicemen's Association	
John Lawrence Moffatt	For service to surf lifesaving	
Aldo Aloysius Moretto	For service to the community	
Major Stanley Sylvester Morton	For service to the Salvation Army and to veterans	
Hans Mueller	For service to the Jewish community	
The Very Reverend Father Mina Labib Nematalla	For service to the Coptic Orthodox Church	
Dr Donald Alfred Nicholls	For service to scouting	
Geffery Noblet	For service to cricket	
Elizabeth Mary Nolan	For service to the State Emergency Service and to the community	
Lance Thomas Norman	For service to local government and to the community	
Barbara Hillier O'Brien	For service to badminton	
George Edward O'Brien	For service to the community	
The Reverend Monsignor John Senan O'Shea	For service to the community, particularly as Port Chaplain for Fremantle	
William Frederick Ottley	For service to the community through the Combined Pensioners and Superannuants Association of New South Wales	
Dr Seweryn Antoni Ozdowski	For service to the Polish community and to furthering Australian Polish relations	
George Thomas Palmer	For service to aged people	
Aubrey Imrie Panton	For service to ballroom dancing	
Richard John Paterson	For service to the media as a radio broadcaster and to the community	
Stanley Mcvey Paul	For service to local government	
Thomas Ackroyd Pettit	For service to the community	
Keith William Phipps	For service to the community, to local government and to the arts	
Barbara Rutherford Pollett	For service to nursing and community health	
Roman Potocki	For service to the Polish community	
Harold Jeffreys (Jeff) Prell	For service to primary industry, to rural organisations and to the community	
Maitland Keith Quartermaine	For service to the mining industry and to historical research	
Edward Royce Ramsamy, BEM	For service to the community	
George Ernest Richardson	For service to the Australian stockhorse breeding industry and to the community	
Herbert Richmond	For service to the community	
Ronald William Riley	For service to hockey	
Barbara Joan Roberts	For service to the community and to local government	
Daphne Olive Robins	For service to the community through music and drama	
Ronald Robson	For service to business and commerce, particularly as an advocate of best practice and workplace reform	
Celia Elizabeth Rosser	For service to botanical art	
Yvonne Alice Mary Rowse	For service to local government and to the community, particularly through the United Hospital Auxiliaries of New South Wales and the Anglican Church	
James Richard Runham	For service to people with disabilities	
Mary Lorraine Sallmann	For service to women through the Queen's Fund	
Nellie Blanche Sansom	For service to the preservation of the site of the first Government House	
Loris Francis Sartori	For service to the Italian community, particularly the care of aged people	
Elizabeth Burnett Cameron Escolme Schmidt	For service to the community	
Richard Sedgwick	For service to the apple and pear industry and to local government	
John George Seed	For service to conservation and the environment	
Abraham Isaac Segal	For service to the community through music organisations, particularly the Australian Musicians Academy	
Dr James Selby	For service to aged people	
Alfred Raymond Settree	For service as a builder and restorer of wooden boats and to the community	
Albert Shield	For service to the community	
David John Shinnick	For service to the Catholic Archdiocese of Adelaide and to the community	
Jan Siejka	For service to the Polish community and to the building industry	
Joseph Benjamin John Smith	For service to the community in rediscovering and marking the historic McMillan Track	
Rosa Catherine Smith	For service to the community, particularly through the Brotherhood of St Laurence	
Dr Geulah Solomon	For service to Jewish women and to the Jewish community	
Keith Spong	For service to the community and to Australian rules football administration	
John Patrick Aloysius Sprouster	For service to business and commerce through promotion of Total Quality Management principles and practice	
Josephine Maree Moore Staughton	For service to the community, particularly aged and invalid people	
David John William Stevens	For service to athletics administration, particularly through the Queensland Athletics Association	
Pauline May Stevens	For service to athletics administration, particularly through the Queensland Athletics Association	
Peter Robert Swan	For service to the community as a member of the Australian Volunteer Coast Guard Association	
Dr Adelheid Elisabeth (Heide) Taylor	For service to the community, particularly through women's organisations and to medicine	
Erna Marlienne Thomson	For service to nursing through the Christian Medical College and Hospital, Vellore, India	
Edward Walter Tobin	For service to sports administration	
Ian Stockdale Tolley	For service to horticulture, particularly the citrus industry	
William Roy Tonkes	For service to lawn bowls	
Joan Trewern	For service to the community, particularly through the Women's Electoral Lobby	
Margaret Shirley Turnbull	For service to the welfare of people with visual impairments	
Michael Thomas Patrick Tynan	For service to local government and to the community	
Norman George Vaughan	For service to pipe and brass bands	
Detective Senior Sergeant John Kenneth Wakefield	For service to the community	
Sister Ann Veronica Walsh	For service to people with impaired hearing	
Violetta Johanna Walsh	For service to the community	
Gladys Aitken Walters	For service to the community, particularly through the Scout Association of Australia	
Ivon Alfred Wardle	For service to the South Australian Parliament, to the community through the Uniting Church in Australia and to aged care	
David John Waters	For service to veterans and to the community	
Bevilie Rae Watson	For service to education, particularly to children and adolescents with poor coordination, learning difficulties and developmental difficulties	
William Stanley Watson	For service to the community, particularly through the Scout Association of Australia	
Kenneth Arthur Watts	For service to the community, particularly through health service organisations	
Brian Frederick Gilbert Webb	For service to the community	
Keith George Westerweller	For service to the community, particularly aged people	
Mary Dunbar White	For service to conservation and the environment	
Dr Francis Charles Hayden Whitebrook, MC	For service to higher education and to sport and fitness	
Harold Douglas Whitehurst	For service to the welfare of veterans through the Korea and South East Asia Forces Association	
Esther Wieselmann	For service to the Jewish community, particularly the care of aged people	
Eunice Agatha Wilkes	For service to the community, particularly by training choirs and organising concerts	
Marilyn Selina Willey	For service to the community and to nursing	
Suzanne Elizabeth Williams	For service to judy as a competitor, coach and administrator	
Dr Martin John Williams	For service to medicine and to the community	
James Maitland Willox	For service to the community, particularly through the Swan Hill Pipe Band	
Dr John Robert Wilson	For service to the recording and preservation of nursing history	
Councillor Peter Robert Woods	For service to local government	
Linda May Wright	For service to horticulture	

==== Military Division ====
Branch	Recipient	Citation	Notes
Navy	Warrant Officer Gordon Anthony Benavente	For service to the Royal Australian Navy and the Submarine Arm, particularly in the billet of Warrant Officer Manpower Planning	
Navy	Chief Petty Officer Stevan Anthony Coll	For exceptional service and devotion to duty to the Royal Australian Navy, particularly as the Coxswain on board HMAS Torrens	
Navy	Lieutenant Commander Colin Fisher	For service to the Royal Australian Navy, particularly as the Personal Services Officer in Victoria	
Army	Warrant Officer Class Two Donald John Hacker	For exceptional service to the Australian Army, particularly in the field of water transport and especially as Squadron Sergeant Major 34 Water Transport Squadron	
Army	Warrant Officer Class Two Julie-Ann Kirkby	For exceptional service to the Australian Army, particularly as the Supervisor Communications 4th Signal Regiment and as President of the Enoggera Long Day Care Centre	
Army	Warrant Officer Class One Shane Michael Seers	For exceptional service to the Australian Army, particularly as the Regimental Sergeant Major of the Australian Army Catering Corps and the Army Catering Centre	
Army	Warrant Officer Class One Mark Stephens	For exemplary service to the Australian Army, particularly as the Regimental Sergeant Major of the 8th/7th Battalion The Royal Victoria Regiment	
Army	John Duncan Thurgar, SC RFD	For exceptional service to the Australian Army Reserve and veteran community	
Air Force	Warrant Officer Roger James Ardill	For service to the Royal Australian Air Force, particularly in the field of financial administration	
Air Force	Sergeant Deborah Lynne Bradley	For service to the Australian Defence Force as a clerk	
Air Force	Warrant Officer Leslie George Foldszin	For service to the Royal Australian Air Force, particularly in the design and development of RAAF clothing	
Air Force	Squadron Leader Mark Alexander Robert Gower	For meritorious service to the Royal Australian Air Force in the field of support to deployed air operations	
