= Veľké Leváre =

Veľké Leváre Nagylévárd
- Municipality
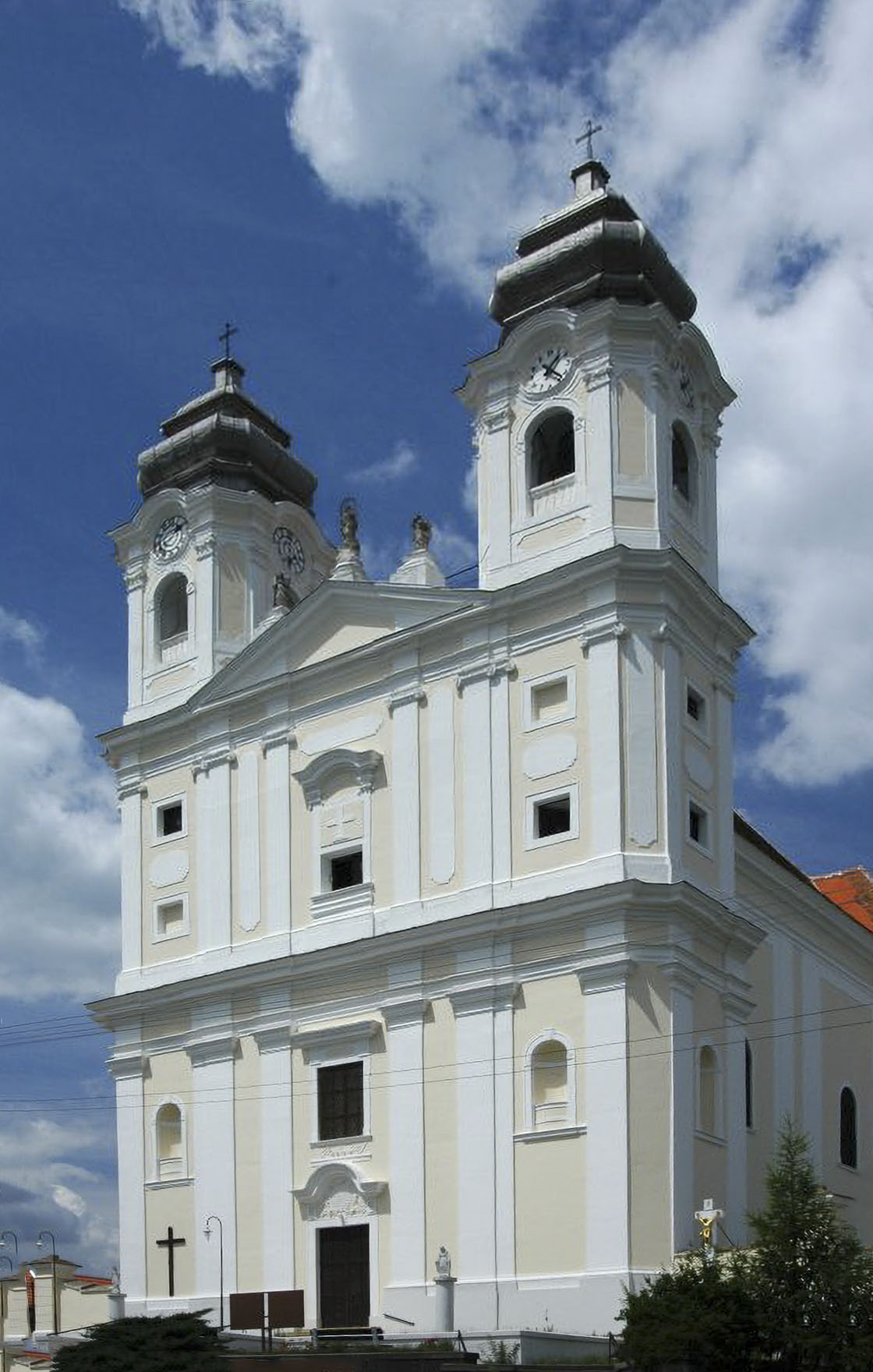
- Church

- Flag

- Location of Veľké Leváre in the Bratislava Region Location of Veľké Leváre in Slovakia
- Coordinates: 48.50°N 17.00°E
- Country: Slovakia
- Region: Bratislava Region
- District: Malacky District
- First mentioned: 1378

Area
  - Total: 23.99 km^{2} (9.26 sq mi)
- Elevation: 170 m (560 ft)

Population (2025)
  - Total: 3,767
- Time zone: UTC+1 (CET)
  - Summer (DST): UTC+2 (CEST)
- Postal code: 908 73
- Area code: +421 34
- Vehicle registration plate (until 2022): MA
- Website: www.levare.sk

Veľké Leváre (Hungarian: Nagylévárd, Nagy-Lévárd, German: Gross-Schützen, Großschützen) is a village and municipality in western Slovakia in Malacky District in the Bratislava region.

The first written notice about the village has its origins in the year 1378. The village Veľké Leváre is situated in the reach of these well-known centers: Bratislava, Vienna, and Brno. The village is placed on a historically important trade route; its history is recorded as a settlement of archers and as a border watch post.

== Geography ==
The municipality lies at an altitude of 170 metres (560 ft) and covers an area of 23.99 km^{2} (9.26 sq mi) (2025).

== History ==
The village contains well-preserved historical architecture, including Haban houses. The remaining structures reflect the village's documented history.

The Habans were followers of an ultra-nonconformist Christian doctrine which, among other things, held that believers should be baptised as youths, not as infants - followers are also known as Anabaptists. In the religious turmoil of 16th- and 17th-century Europe this was regarded as heresy and frequently resulted in severe persecution. Several groups left their original homes in Germany, some heading west to North America (where one group became known as the Amish); others went east, some ending up in the village of Veľké Leváre in Záhorie.

Local landowners were keen for them to settle here: they were well-behaved, reliable taxpayers and prodigiously hard workers. Their main occupation was pottery making. Haban designs are very similar to those still used in Modra pottery; indeed it is very likely that this is where the Modra potters got their techniques. The main difference is that Haban designs never use red, which is associated with blood.

The Habans were not allowed to settle in the centre of Veľké Leváre, instead forming a compound around a square on the edge of the village with a mill, workshops, church, meeting hall and houses (the word "Haban" refers to their distinctive homes). Theirs was a culture apart: children were brought up communally; marriage to non-Habans was prohibited and, since the community was small, a board approved marriages to prevent in-breeding.

In the 16th century Croatian colonists came. The family Kollonic, whose members had a significant influence in the Austro-Hungarian monarchy, owned properties and a castle in the neighboring Austria (the village of Jedenspeigen). During the years 1683–1685, the Kollonics built a baroque manor house with a belonging English park in the village.

Cardinal Žigmund Kollonič - a Veľké Leváre compatriot and Vienna archbishop built a huge Roman Catholic church in the place of original wooden church during the years 1729–33 that is a dominant of the village and the surroundings. The church was consecrated to the Virgin Mary's name at the occasion of the 50th anniversary of the Christian victory over the Turks during a battle nearby Vienna. A temple of the evangelic church a.c. was built at the end of the 18th century.

== Flora and fauna ==
There are 36 fish species in the river Rudava that flows through the village territory. In the northern part of Veľké Leváre the national nature reserve Abrod is situated. The border river Morava flows through the western edge of the village territory. The noteworthy nature attract tourists and experts by spots with specific and rare vegetation, bird nest places and beaver dams.

== Population ==
Population statistic (10 years)
Year	1995	2005	2015	2025
Count	3217	3566	3558	3767
Difference		+10.84%	−0.22%	+5.87%

Population statistic
Year	2024	2025
Count	3762	3767
Difference		+0.13%

It has a population of 3767 people (31 December 2025).

=== Ethnicity ===
Census 2021 (1+ %)
Ethnicity	Number	Fraction
Slovak	3443	92.57%
Not found out	228	6.13%
Czech	60	1.61%
Romani	55	1.47%
Total	3719	

In year 2021 was 3719 people by ethnicity 3443 as Slovak, 228 as Not found out, 60 as Czech, 55 as Romani, 21 as Hungarian, 10 as Rusyn, 10 as Other, 6 as Serbian, 5 as Russian, 4 as Romanian, 4 as German, 3 as Polish, 2 as Ukrainian, 2 as Austrian, 2 as French, 2 as Bulgarian, 1 as Jewish, 1 as Moravian and 1 as Canadian.

Note on population: The difference values of population numbers in the table "Population statistic" and in the sections "Ethnicity" & "Religion" is caused by the use of various statistical methods.

=== Religion ===
Census 2021 (1+ %)
Religion	Number	Fraction
Roman Catholic Church	2310	62.11%
None	940	25.28%
Not found out	222	5.97%
Evangelical Church	134	3.6%
Total	3719	

In year 2021 was 3719 people by religion 2310 from Roman Catholic Church, 940 from None, 222 from Not found out, 134 from Evangelical Church, 28 from Greek Catholic Church, 24 from Ad hoc movements, 14 from Christian Congregations in Slovakia, 11 from Other, 10 from Jehovah's Witnesses, 7 from Eastern Orthodox Church, 6 from Calvinist Church, 6 from Other and not ascertained christian church, 2 from Buddhism, 1 from Jewish community, 1 from Paganism and natural spirituality, 1 from Islam, 1 from Church of the Brethren and 1 from Bahá'i Community.

== Business activities ==
Asparagus plantations of the company Asparagus ltd. are situated in the flat country outside the village. Other business activities in the village are: production of prefabricated building products (Prefabrikát, joint stock company), cardboard packaging (Surpack, joint stock company), engineering production (Bleckman, ltd.).

== Famous people ==
- Ladislav Slovák, conductor
- Gustav Brom (Frkal), jazz musician
