= Rudolf Pekárek =

Czech-Australian conductor (1900–1974)

Rudolf Pekárek (24 February 1900 – 26 October 1974) was a Czech-Australian conductor.

== Background ==
In 1934 he founded the Prague Symphony Orchestra, giving work to many unemployed musicians. It was known as the FOK Orchestra (Film – Opera – Konzert), or the FOK Salon Orchestra or sometimes Pekárek's Salon Orchestra. At the beginning the ensemble made its living by intensive recording of music for films, and only later changed its focus to presenting the standard repertoire in concert. It first played on radio on 29 December 1934.

As a Jew, Pekárek was imprisoned in 1942 during the German occupation during World War II. He was forced to work in Polish mines. He escaped the Germans in 1944, joined the Czech Army of Liberation and survived the war (see Resistance in German-occupied Czechoslovakia). In October 1948 he emigrated to Sydney, Australia on the Ugolino Vivaldi.

While in Australia he worked with soloist Tatjana Hitrina.

== Career ==
Pekárek was broadcast on Adelaide radio station, 5AD, in September 1949 when conducting the South Australian Symphony Orchestra with Clement Q Williams as soloist. By November of that year he was appointed as a conductor for the ABC Orchestra of Western Australia. Later it became the West Australian Symphony Orchestra, which he also conducted.

In 1954 he became chief conductor of the Queensland Symphony Orchestra, a post he held until 1967.

He died in 1974, in Brisbane.

The annual Rudolph [sic] Pekarek Oboe Prize at the Queensland Conservatorium Griffith University was established in his honour, the prize money being paid from his estate.

A collection of his biographical cuttings is held at the National Library of Australia
