= Martin Turnovský =

Czech conductor (1928–2021)

Martin Turnovský (29 September 1928 – 19 May 2021) was a Czech conductor whose career flourished under the guidance of George Szell, but was hampered by the communist regime.

== Biography ==
Turnovský was born in Prague. As a boy, he showed promise as a pianist, though hopes of progressing further with this were dashed when the Nazis invaded in 1939. During World War II, at the age of 16, Turnovský was imprisoned in a German concentration camp, due to his partially Jewish origin. He studied conducting at the Prague Academy of Music as a pupil of Karel Ančerl. His father was familiar with the conductor George Szell, who helped in the beginnings of Turnovský's career. Szell invited Turnovsky to study with him in New York, though Czechoslovakia's communist regime forbade it. So he trained with provincial Czech orchestras instead. Even so, he observed that Szell's conducting style "lacked warmth" and he based his style on Leonard Bernstein instead as he wanted to "enthuse" the musicians around him. He won the first prize at the International Conductors Competition of 1958 in Besançon, France.

Turnovský was appointed chief conductor of the Radio Symphony Orchestra Plzeň (1963–66), the Sächsische Staatskapelle Dresden and Semperoper (1966–1968), the Norwegian National Opera (1975–80), the Opera in Bonn (1979–83), and the Prague Symphony Orchestra (1992–95). He was also permanent guest conductor of the Czech Philharmonic Orchestra (1960–1968).

He regularly conducted in the Prague Spring Festival, and made some well renowned recordings for the famous Supraphon record label.

After the invasion of the Warsaw Pact armies into Czechoslovakia (Prague Spring), Turnovský emigrated to Austria and was granted Austrian citizenship. However, following the Velvet Revolution in 1989 he returned to Prague.

After Turnovský gained Austrian citizenship, he conducted many more symphony orchestras, including the New York Philharmonic, the Cleveland Orchestra, the Detroit Symphony Orchestra, the Seattle Symphony, the London Symphony Orchestra, the Bavarian Radio Symphony Orchestra, l'Orchestre de la Suisse Romande, the Vienna Symphony, the Bamberg Symphony, the Toronto Symphony Orchestra, the City of Birmingham Symphony Orchestra, the Royal Liverpool Philharmonic, the Gunma Symphony Orchestra (as Honorary conductor), the Tokyo Metropolitan Symphony Orchestra, and other orchestras.

On one occasion, he was sitting in the audience when another conductor had to pull out at the last minute. He was called upon to conduct the entire performance, although not having his glasses with him, did so entirely from memory.

He died on 19 May 2021 in Vienna, aged 92.
