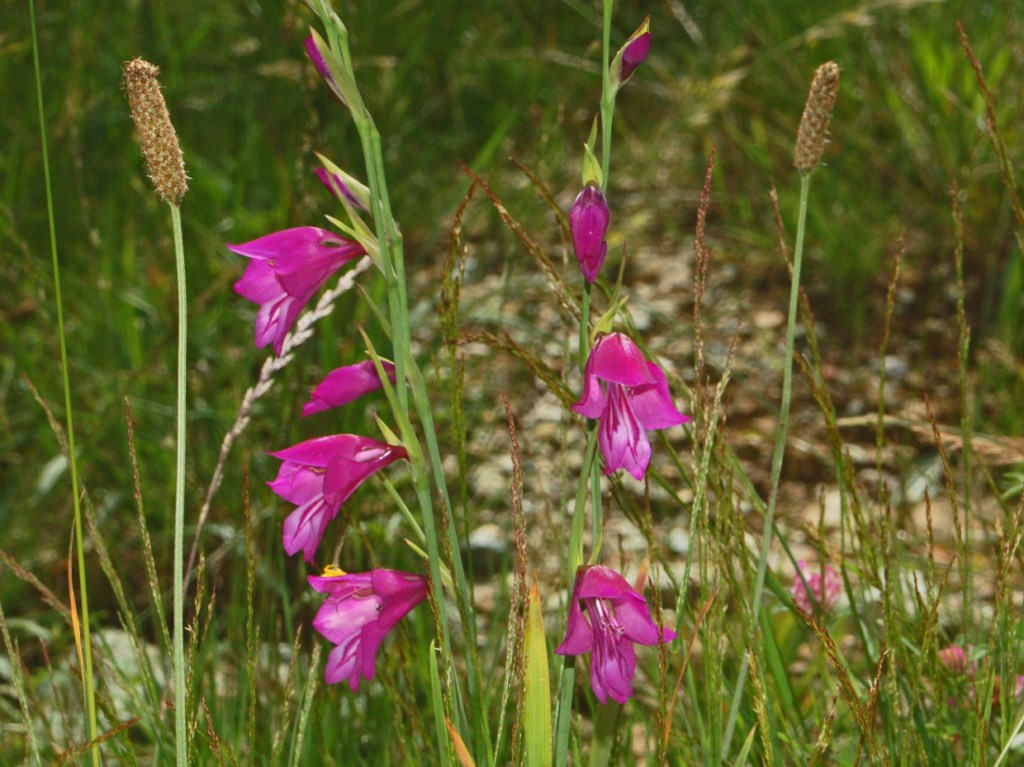

Conservation status
- Data Deficient (IUCN 3.1)

Scientific classification
- Kingdom: Plantae
- Clade: Tracheophytes
- Clade: Angiosperms
- Clade: Monocots
- Order: Asparagales
- Family: Iridaceae
- Genus: Gladiolus
- Species: G. palustris

Binomial name
- Gladiolus palustris Gaudin

Synonyms
- Gladiolus boucheanus Schltdl.; Gladiolus communis subsp. palustris (Gaudin) Bonnier & Layens; Gladiolus felicis Z.Mirek; Gladiolus imbricatus subsp. parviflorus K.Richt.; Gladiolus parviflorus Berdau; Gladiolus pratensis A.Dietr.; Gladiolus triphyllus Bertol.

= Gladiolus palustris =

Species of plant

Gladiolus palustris, common name marsh gladiolus or sword lily, is a herbaceous perennial plant belonging to the genus Gladiolus of the family Iridaceae. The genus name Gladiolus is the Latin diminutive of gladius, a sword, while the specific Latin name palustris, meaning growing in marshes, refers to the alleged environment of this species.

== Description ==
Gladiolus palustris reaches on average 30–60 centimetres (12–24 in) of height. The stem is erect, glabrous and unbranched, the bulbus is spherical with cross-linked fibers at the top. The leaves are shorter than the stem, simple, with a parallel venation, sword-shaped, 4–9 centimetres (1.6–3.5 in) long. The inflorescence is composed of three to six hermaphroditic flowers, trifoliate, with a rosy violet or magenta perigonium, about 30 centimetres (12 in) long. The flowering period of these plants extends from May through July. They are pollinated by bumblebees.

== Distribution ==
This species is native of Central and NW Europe. It occurs in eastern France, Switzerland, in southern and eastern Germany, the Czech Republic, Slovakia and Poland. It is present in the Italian Alps, Austria and Hungary and more common in the Balkan region. Other locations are in Eastern Europe, including Romania.

== Habitat ==
Notwithstanding the name, these plants do not grow in marshes, as they prefer calcareous, moist and humus rich environments alternately wet and dry, in wet meadows and forest clearings. They can be found at a maximum altitude of 1,200–1,500 metres (3,900–4,900 ft).
