= Ken McKinnon (academic administrator) =

Australian academic administrator

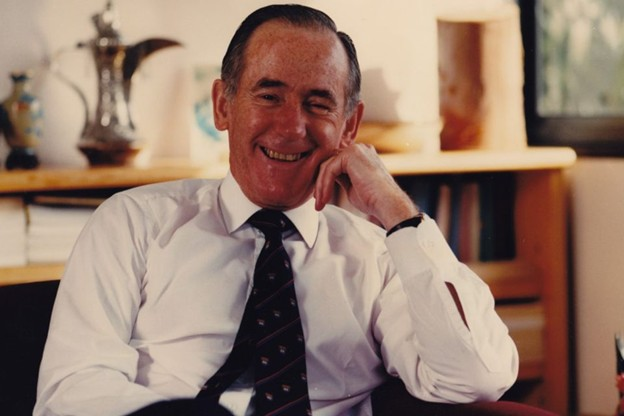
- Kenneth Richard McKinnon at Home

Personal details
- Born: Kenneth Richard McKinnon; 1 January 1931 Auburn, South Australia, Australia
- Died: 26 April 2026 (aged 95) Wollongong
- Spouses: Mavis McKinnon (divorced) Sue Walker (m. 1981)
- Children: 1
- Education: Harvard University (EdD)

Kenneth Richard McKinnon AO (1 January 1931 – 26 April 2026) was the second vice-chancellor of the University of Wollongong between 1981 and 1994. He also served as interim vice-chancellor of James Cook University in 1997 and Charles Darwin University from 2002 to 2003, where he was responsible for the name change from Northern Territory University. He was also chairman of the Australian Press Council from 2000–2011. His other appointments include being a board member of the College of Law, president of the Australian Vice-Chancellors' Committee and chairman of the National Commission for UNESCO as well as a consultant to the World Bank and 18 universities in Australia, New Zealand and Indonesia.

McKinnon was a pioneering director of education in PNG from 1966–73; known as the man who reformed and redirected the education system, gave it a national orientation and put it on an 'independence footing'.

He had been amongst the first batch of young Australian teachers trained at ASOPA in 1954 and bound for Papua New Guinea. Later that year he moved to Papua New Guinea to be a headmaster. It was an early highlight of his career and after eight years he had risen to the position of superintendent of schools.

In the end, the prestigious Harkness Fellowship won McKinnon over and he spent two years in Boston completing his studies.

He returned to PNG in 1966 as the Director of Education and worked closely with PNG's future prime minister Michael Somare, earning praise for his efforts in decolonisation as he prepared local leaders to take over.

The main Law building and co-purpose lecture theatre at the University of Wollongong is named in honour of his contribution during this time.

McKinnon was made an Officer of the Order of Australia in the 1995 Queen's Birthday Honours for "service to education, to the community and to the arts".

Another highlight of McKinnon's varied career was as co-lead, together with Douglas Swan, of the NSW Department of Education's 1984 document Future Directions of Secondary Education, which proposed sweeping overhauls to the structure of schools in New South Wales, reshaping the educational landscape. The changes were designed to better accommodate the massive influx of students staying on for senior high school.

Ultimately, the Swan–McKinnon report laid vital foundational work for subsequent decades of secondary schooling reviews, syllabus designs, and vocational education pathways in the state..

In 2012, together with Suzanne Walker, a considerable sum of money was donated to the Crocodile Prize that allowed the printing of up to 10,000 books of original Papua New Guinean writing to be circulated throughout the length and breadth of the country. It was believed that this print run of The Crocodile Prize Anthology 2012 was the largest of any book published in PNG.

The Crocodile Prize was established in 2010 by Keith Jackson AM and Phil Fitzpatrick to encourage creative and critical writing in Papua New Guinean and to provide Papua New Guineans with access to home-grown literature.

He and his wife, Sue Walker, set up the McKinnon Walker Trust to fund research at the University of Wollongong.

McKinnon died on 26 April 2026, aged 95.

Academic offices
Preceded by Michael Birt	Vice-Chancellor of the University of Wollongong; 1981–1994	Succeeded by Gerard Sutton
Preceded by Ron McKay	Vice-Chancellor of Northern Territory University; 2002–2003	Succeeded by Helen Garnett as Vice-Chancellor of Charles Darwin University
