= Bridget Boland =

Irish-British screenwriter, playwright and novelist (1913–1988)

- Born: 13 March 1913; London, England
- Died: 19 January 1988 (aged 74)
- Occupation: Writer

Bridget Boland (13 March 1913 – 19 January 1988) was a British screenwriter, playwright and novelist.

== Life ==
Bridget Boland was born in London on 13 March 1913 to Irish politician John Pius Boland and Eileen Querin Boland (née Moloney).

Boland was educated at the Convent of the Sacred Heart, Roehampton and at Oxford University, where she studied philosophy, politics, and economics, graduating B.A. in 1935. In 1937 she became a film writer. From 1941 to 1946 she served in the Auxiliary Territorial Service, producing plays for the troops to boost morale from 1943 to 1946.

Boland reflected on her life and work in 1987:

"Although I hold a British passport I am in fact Irish, and the daughter of an Irish politician at that, which may account for a certain contrariness in my work. Many playwrights have become screenwriters; so I was a screenwriter and became a playwright. Most women writers excel on human stories in domestic settings: so I am bored by domestic problems, and allergic to domestic settings. I succeed best with heavy drama (The Prisoner), so I can't resist trying to write frothy comedy (Temple Folly).
By the time you have written half a dozen plays or so you began to realize you are probably still trying to write the one you started with. However different I begin by thinking is the theme of each, I find that in the end every play is saying: "Belief is dangerous" – the theme of Cockpit.

== Works ==
=== Selected filmography ===
- Laugh It Off (1940)
- Gaslight (1940)
- Freedom Radio (1941)
- He Found a Star (1941)
- This England (1941)
- Prelude to Fame (1950)
- The Fake (1953)
- The Prisoner (1955)
- War and Peace (1956)
- Anne of the Thousand Days (1969)

=== Plays ===
- The Arabian Nights, produced 1948
- Cockpit, produced 1948; featured in Plays of the Year 1, 1949; filmed as The Lost People
- The Damascus Blade, produced 1950
- The Return, produced 1952 as Journey to Earth and 1953 as The Return
- The Prisoner, produced 1954; featured in Plays of the Year 10, 1954
- Gordon, produced 1961; featured in Plays of the Year 25, 1962
- The Zodiac in the Establishment, produced 1963
- A Juan by Degrees, produced 1965 (adaptation of a play by Pierre Humblot)
- Time Out of Mind, produced 1970

=== Novels ===
- The Wild Geese, 1938
- Portrait of a Lady in Love, 1942
- Caterina, 1975

== Other ==
- (with Maureen Boland) Old Wives' Lore for Gardeners, 1976
- Gardener's Magic and Other Old Wives' Lore, 1977
- At My Mother's Knee, 1978
- (ed.) The Lisle Letters: An Abridgement, 1983. Abridgement of the 6-volume edition edited by Muriel St. Clare Byrne
