= Queensland Symphony Orchestra =

Australian orchestra

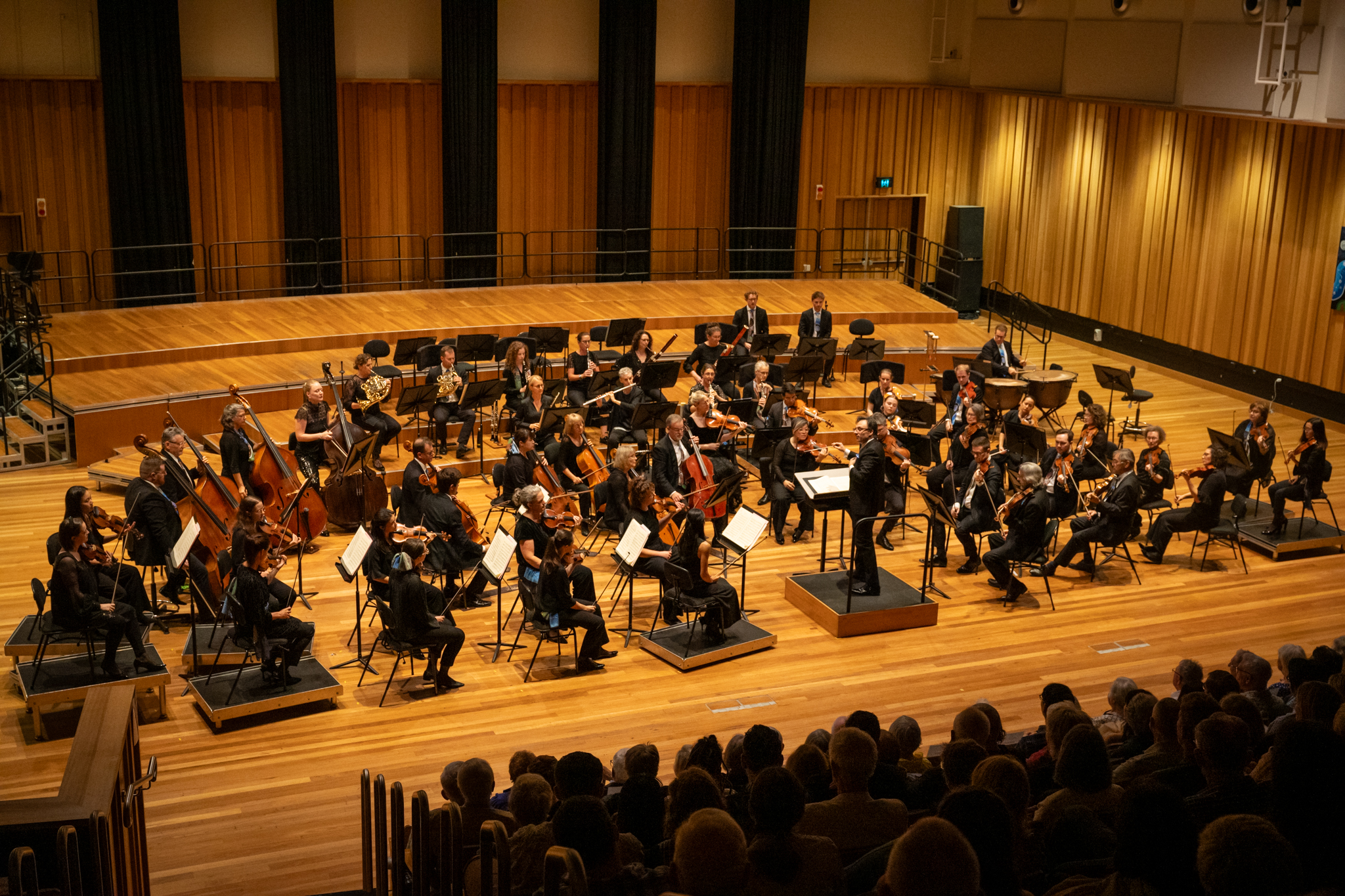
- Queensland Symphony Orchestra performing at QSO Studios
- Former name: The Queensland Orchestra
- Founded: 1947; 79 years ago
- Location: Brisbane, Australia
- Concert hall: Queensland Performing Arts Centre
- Principal conductor: Umberto Clerici
- Website: qso.com.au

The Queensland Symphony Orchestra (QSO) is an Australian symphony orchestra located in the state of Queensland. The orchestra is based in the Australian Broadcasting Corporation's building in South Bank. The orchestra operates as a registered not-for-profit company with funding from the state government, the Australian federal government through the Australia Council, and private corporations.

== History ==
The Queensland Symphony Orchestra played its first concert on 26 March 1947, consisting of 45 musicians, conducted by Percy Code. John Farnsworth Hall was recruited from the Sydney Symphony Orchestra as the orchestra's first chief conductor. The orchestra played concerts in various Queensland cities and towns, such as Innisfail and Townsville, travelling up to 3500 miles a year in the process.

During the first part of its history, the QSO's longest-serving chief conductor was Rudolf Pekárek (1954–1967). In 1988, Vladimir Kamirski was appointed chief guest conductor. Muhai Tang was chief conductor from 1991 to 2001.

In 2001, QSO was merged with Queensland Philharmonic Orchestra, to form The Queensland Orchestra (TQO). Michael Christie was the first chief conductor of the orchestra under its new name, from 2001 to 2004. In July 2007, Johannes Fritzsch was named the next chief conductor of TQO, beginning in January 2008, with an initial contract through 2010. On 14 October 2009, the orchestra announced its intention to revert to its former name of the Queensland Symphony Orchestra, effective in 2010. In February 2010, the orchestra announced a three-year extension of Fritzsch's contract as chief conductor, through 2013. Fritzsch stood down as QSO chief conductor at the end of 2014, and subsequently took the title of conductor laureate of Queensland Symphony Orchestra.

In May 2015, Alondra de la Parra made her first guest-conducting appearance with the orchestra. In October 2015, the orchestra announced the appointment of de la Parra as its first-ever music director and first-ever female conductor in its principal conducting post, effective in 2017. De la Parra completed her tenure as music director at the end of the 2019 season. In February 2021, the QSO announced the return of Fritzsch to the orchestra as its new principal conductor and artistic adviser, with a contract until 2023.

In 2021, Umberto Clerici made three guest-conducting appearances with the QSO. In May 2022, the QSO announced the appointment of Clerici as its next chief conductor, effective 1 January 2023, with an initial contract of three years. In parallel, Fritzsch took the title of principal guest conductor in 2023, and resumed his post as conductor laureate in 2024. Michael Sterzinger became CEO of the orchestra in November 2024.

Also in November 2024, the QSO announced a two-year extension of Clerici's contract as chief conductor through the end of 2027. In September 2026, the QSO announced that Clerici is to stand down as chief conductor at the close of his current contract, at the end of 2027.

The QSO's discography includes Tchaikovsky's 1812 Overture, and several works of Benjamin Frankel, including his eight symphonies, violin concerto, viola concerto, and several film score suites.

== Performance venues ==
Most of the orchestra's performances take place in Brisbane at three venues:

- Queensland Performing Arts Centre (QPAC) Concert Hall
- QSO Studios, South Bank
- Brisbane City Hall

In addition, the orchestra tours other parts of the state of Queensland regularly, including the following locations:

- Gold Coast Art Centre
- The Events Centre, Caloundra
- Empire Theatres, Toowoomba
- Pilbeam Theatre, Rockhampton
- Mackay Entertainment Centre
- Townsville Civic Theatre
- Cairns Civic Theatre

== Chief conductors ==
- John Farnsworth Hall (1947–1954)
- Rudolf Pekárek (1954–1967)
- Stanford Robinson (1968–1969)
- Ezra Rachlin (1970–1972)
- Patrick Thomas (1973–1977)
- Vančo Čavdarski (1978–1982)
- Werner Andreas Albert (1983–1990)
- Muhai Tang (1991–2001)
- Michael Christie (2001–2004)
- Johannes Fritzsch (2008–2014)
- Alondra de la Parra (2017–2019; music director)
- Johannes Fritzsch (2021–2022; principal conductor and artistic adviser)
- Umberto Clerici (2023–present)

== Awards and nominations ==
=== ARIA Music Awards ===
The ARIA Music Awards is an annual awards ceremony that recognises excellence, innovation, and achievement across all genres of Australian music. They commenced in 1987.

Year	Nominee / work	Award	Result	Ref.
1999	Ariel's Music (with Paul Dean and Richard Mills)	Best Classical Album	Nominated	
2004	Sculthorpe: Songs of Sea and Sky (with William Barton)	Best Classical Album	Nominated	
2006	Piano Concertos: Tchaikovsky, Grieg (with Simon Tedeschi & Richard Bonynge)	Best Classical Album	Nominated	
2006	Rodrigo Guitar Concertos (with Slava Grigoryan, Leonard Grigoryan & Brett Kelly)	Best Classical Album	Nominated	
2016	Gallipoli Symphony	Best Original Soundtrack, Cast or Show Album	Nominated	
