= Tibor Paul =

Hungarian-Australian conductor

Tibor Paul (29 March 1909 – 11 November 1973) was a Hungarian-Australian conductor.

== Background ==
He was born in Budapest, Hungary to Antal János Paul, vintner, and his wife Gizella, née Verényi. He studied piano and woodwind under Zoltán Kodály, Hermann Scherchen and Felix Weingartner. In 1930 he founded the Budapest Concert Orchestra. In 1939 he began conducting his own orchestra. He also conducted at the Budapest National Theatre and by 1945 he was principal conductor for the Hungarian Broadcasting Corporation.

In 1948, Paul left for Switzerland. He conducted for the Swiss Broadcasting Corporation and at the opera house in Bern. He migrated to Australia in 1950. He soon became a conductor with the New South Wales National Opera and a guest conductor with the Australian Broadcasting Commission (ABC). He taught orchestral and choral conducting at the New South Wales State Conservatorium of Music from 1954. He was also principal conductor for the Elizabethan Theatre Trust Opera Company in 1954-55. He became an Australian citizen in 1955.

He worked with soloist Tatjana Hitrina in the early 1950s.

== Career ==
Tibor Paul travelled widely throughout Australia and conducted in every capital city. He was the conductor of the Tasmanian concert attended by the very young Stuart Challender which caused Challender to set his sights on becoming a conductor himself. However, because the ABC was unable to offer Paul sufficient engagements, he made regular trips to Britain, Italy, Switzerland, the Netherlands, Denmark, France, Portugal and Austria. He was a vigorous promoter of Australian composers, and he toured Europe and North America in 1958 and included the work of Australians in his concerts.

In 1959 Paul left for Europe with his wife and younger son. He eventually settled in the Republic of Ireland, where he was principal conductor (1961–67) with the Radio Éireann Symphony Orchestra and director of music (1962–67) for Raidió Teilifís Éireann, Dublin. There he conducted such world premieres as Brian Boydell’s cantata "A Terrible Beauty is Born" in 1966. He was a co-founder of the Limerick Choral Union, and conducted its first performance on 4 May 1964, Mozart’s Requiem, with soloists including Bernadette Greevy. With this choir he also led the first performances in Ireland of Beethoven’s Missa Solemnis and Mass in D (1967) and Janáček’s Glagolitic Mass (1968).

He returned to Sydney in October 1968 to conduct the Elizabethan Theatre Trust Orchestra. Over the next six years he divided his time between Australia and Europe. He was chief conductor of the West Australian Symphony Orchestra from 1971, his term, which was to have continued through 1974, being cut short by his death. In January 1973 he conducted the combined West Australian and South Australian symphony orchestras in a performance to inaugurate the Perth Concert Hall.

He died of a coronary occlusion on 11 November 1973 in his home at Wahroonga, Sydney, survived by his wife and sons.

He had a fiery temperament, a prodigious memory, and seldom conducted from a score. His controversial manner was a matter of discussion in the Irish Parliament in 1966.In his autobiography, Thomas Edmonds, a world renowned tenor, described Paul as 'a dictator, highly critical of soloists, not once in rehearsals referring to them by name'. He refused to work with Paul again.

== Personal life ==
On 9 November 1935 he married Maria Penninger in Budapest; they had two sons.
