= Buková =

Buková may refer to places:

== Czech Republic ==
- Buková (Plzeň-South District), a municipality and village in the Plzeň Region
- Buková (Prostějov District), a municipality and village in the Olomouc Region
- Buková, a village and part of Benešov in the Central Bohemian Region
- Buková, a village and part of Bernartice (Jeseník District) in the Olomouc Region
- Buková, a village and part of Dlažov in the Plzeň Region
- Buková, a village and part of Mezholezy (former Horšovský Týn District) in the Plzeň Region
- Buková, a village and part of Nížkov in the Vysočina Region
- Buková, a village and part of Olešnice (České Budějovice District) in the South Bohemian Region
- Buková, a village and part of Pravonín in the Central Bohemian Region
- Buková, a village and part of Řemíčov in the South Bohemian Region
- Buková, a village and part of Třešť in the Vysočina Region
- Buková, a village and part of Věšín in the Central Bohemian Region
- Buková u Příbramě, a municipality and village in the Central Bohemian Region
- Nová Buková, a municipality and village in the Vysočina Region
- Velká Buková, a municipality and village in the Central Bohemian Region

== Slovakia ==
- Buková, Trnava District, a municipality and village in the Trnava Region
