= Mezholezy =

Mezholezy may refer to places in the Czech Republic:

- Mezholezy (former Domažlice District), a municipality and village in the Plzeň Region
- Mezholezy (former Horšovský Týn District), a municipality and village in the Plzeň Region
- Mezholezy, a village and part of Miskovice in the Central Bohemian Region
