= Little Carpathians Protected Landscape Area =

Protected landscape area of Slovakia

Little Carpathians Protected Landscape Area CHKO Malé Karpaty
- IUCN category V (protected landscape/seascape)
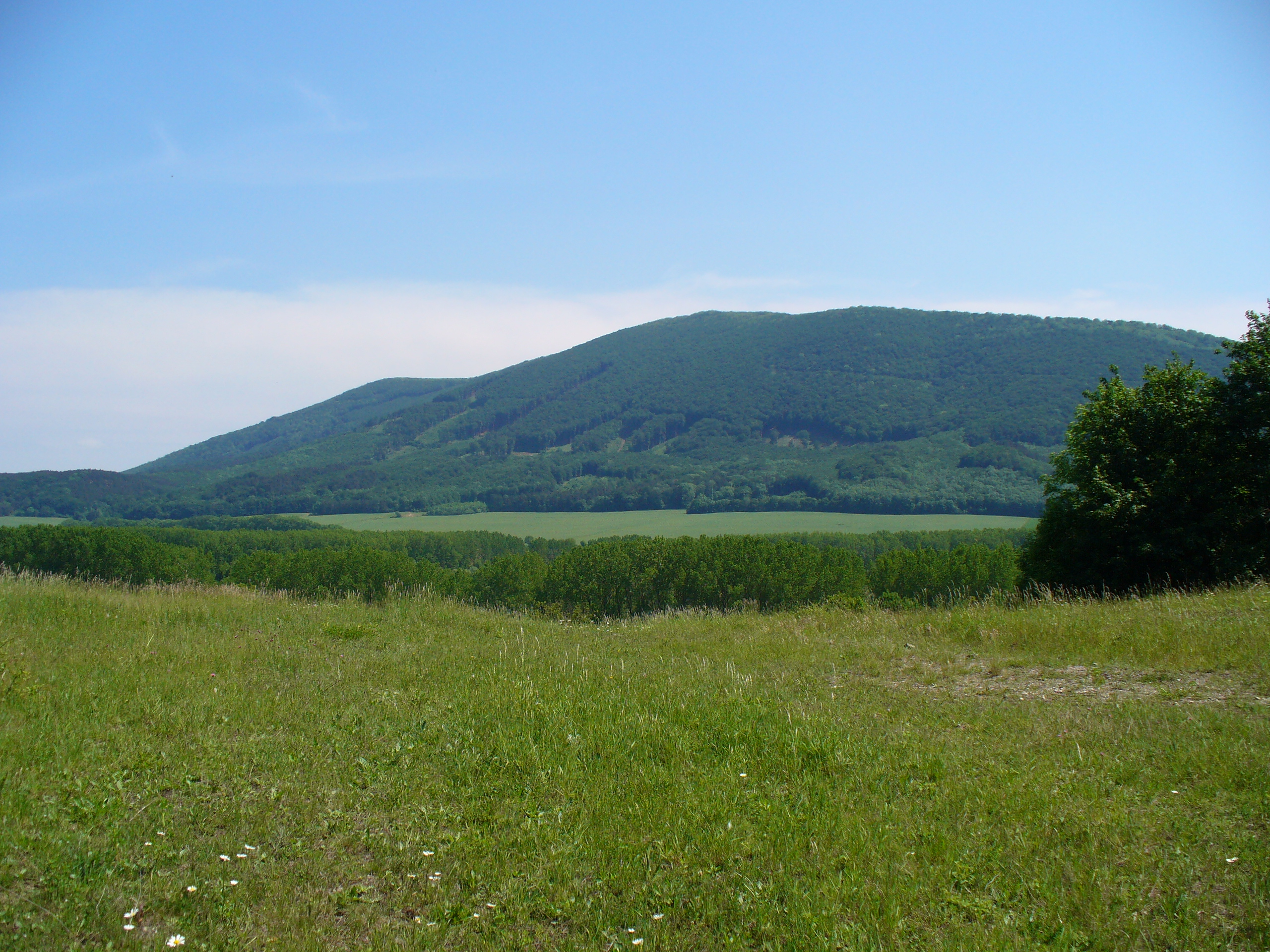
- Záruby, the highest point at 768 m AMSL
- Interactive map of Little Carpathians Protected Landscape Area; CHKO Malé Karpaty
- Location: West Slovakia, Little Carpathians Mts.
- Coordinates: 48°25′N 17°15′E
- Area: 167.71 km^{2} (64.75 sq mi)
- Established: 5 May 1976
- Governing body: Správa CHKO Malé Karpaty (CHKO Malé Karpaty administration) in Trnava

Little Carpathians Protected Landscape Area (Slovak: Chránená krajinná oblasť Malé Karpaty) is one of the 14 protected landscape areas in Slovakia. The Landscape Area is situated in the Little Carpathians, part of the Carpathian Mountains, in West Slovakia. The southwesternmost area is Devínska Kobyla in Bratislava, and the northeasternmost area is the Čachtice Carpathians at the town of Nové Mesto nad Váhom and the village of Čachtice in the Trenčín Region. Both areas are separated from the main mountain strip. The area protects 646.1 km^{2} (249.5 mi^{2}) of the mountains.

== History ==
The Little Carpathians Protected Landscape Area was established on 5 May 1976. The law that created the Landscape Area was amended on 30 March 2001.

Before the Little Carpathians PLA was declared in 1976, there were 6 protected areas in the territory: Roštún National Nature Reserve (since 1953), Devínska Kobyla National Nature Reserve (1964), Čachtice Castle Hill National Nature Reserve (1964), Sandberg Nature Reserve (1964), Driny Cave Nature Monument (1968), and Čachtická Cave Nature Monument (1972).

== Geography ==
The Little Carpathians are the borderline mountains of the Inner Western Carpathians. The three highest points are Záruby at 768 m (2,520 ft), Vysoká at 754 m (2,474 ft) and Vápenná at 752 m (2,467 ft).

== Biology and ecology ==
Deciduous trees are dominant, with the beech, linden, European ash, and sycamore maple being most widespread. The Little Carpathians PLA is the only place in Slovakia where some plants grow, for example, Ruscus hypoglossum and Rhamnus saxatilis. Insects include 700 species of butterflies and 20 species of ants. Notable species of birds are represented by the rock thrush, northern wheatear, black stork, European honey buzzard, short-toed eagle, Eurasian eagle-owl, long-eared owl, and European nightjar. The Landscape Area is home to the largest population of the saker falcon in Slovakia.

== Protected areas ==
The protected landscape area includes other protected areas like nature reserves and national nature reserves. These include:

- Strmina
- Pod Pajštúnom
- Jurské jazero

== Tourism ==
The Little Carpathians PLA is the only large protected area in Slovakia with extensive vineyards, which are a part of the Little Carpathians Wine Route. The southwestern part contains the Bratislava Forest Park, which is popular with many visitors from Bratislava and includes localities like Koliba.

There are many castles in the area, many of which are in ruins now. The notable examples are Biely Kameň Castle, Červený Kameň Castle and Smolenice Castle.

The Landscape Area includes an extensive network of hiking trails and bicycle trails. Driny is the only cave open to public.

== Gallery ==
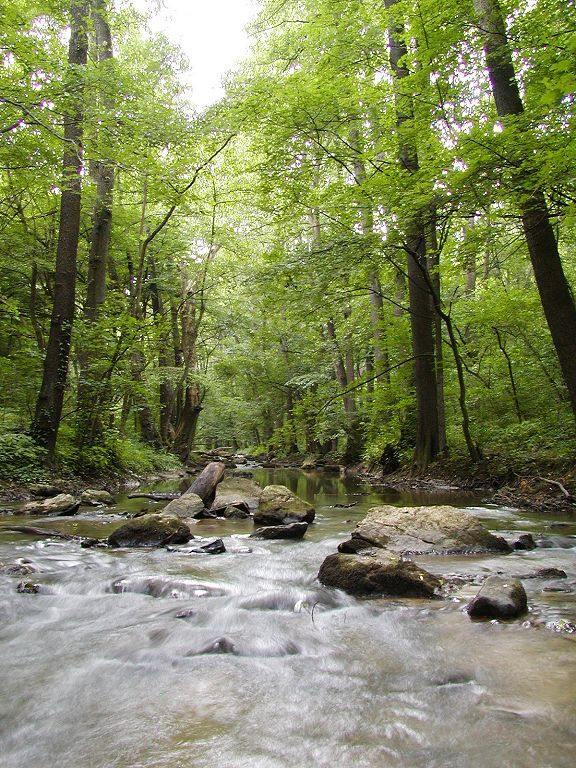
Jablonka Creek between the villages of Višňové and Čachtice

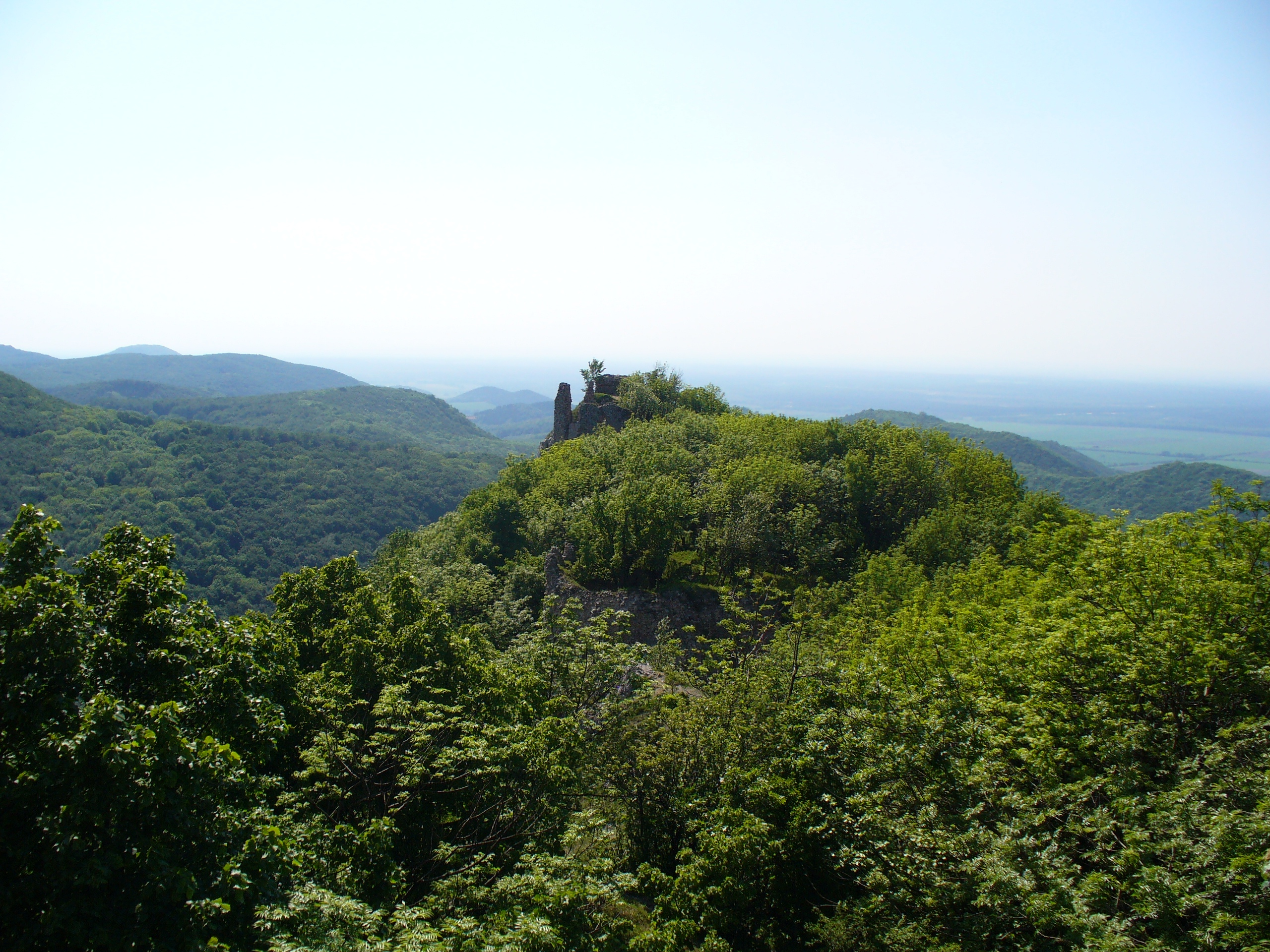
Ruins of Ostrý Kameň Castle at 569 m near Záruby

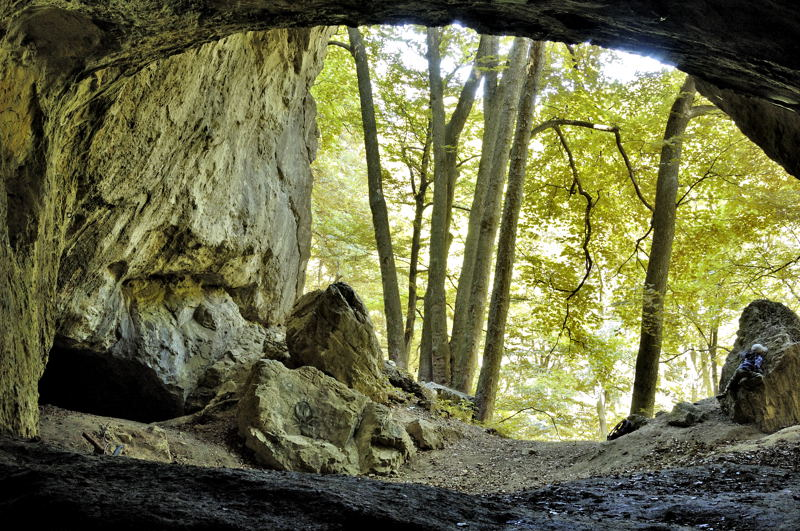
Cave Deravá skala

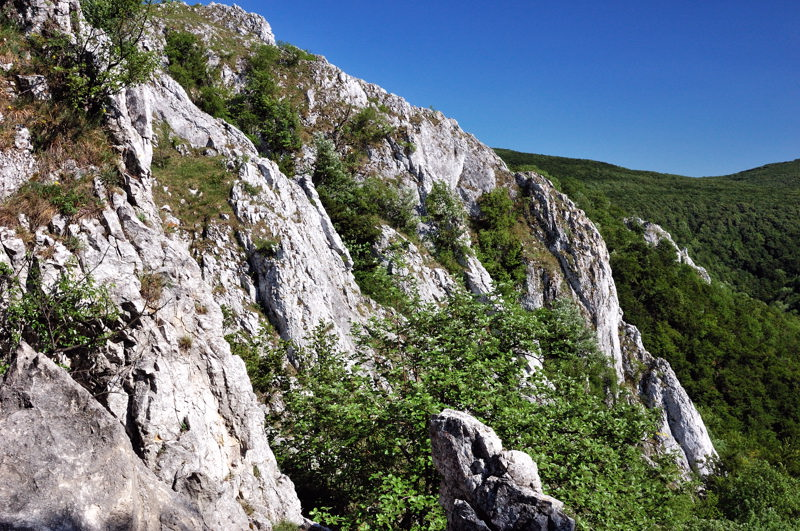
Kršlenica Rocks

== See also ==
- Protected areas of Slovakia
- List of castles in Slovakia
