= Vysoká =

Vysoká may refer to places:

== Czech Republic ==
- Vysoká (Bruntál District), a municipality and village in the Moravian-Silesian Region
- Vysoká (Havlíčkův Brod District), a municipality and village in the Vysočina Region
- Vysoká (Hostýn-Vsetín Mountains), a peak in the Hostýn-Vsetín Mountains
- Vysoká (Mělník District), a municipality and village in the Central Bohemian Region
- Vysoká (Svitavy District), a municipality and village in the Pardubice Region
- Vysoká nad Labem, a municipality and village in the Hradec Králové Region
- Vysoká u Příbramě, a municipality and village in the Central Bohemian Region
- Vysoká, a village and part of Chrastava in the Liberec Region
- Vysoká, a village and part of Dalovice (Karlovy Vary District) in the Karlovy Vary Region
- Vysoká, a village and part of Hustopeče nad Bečvou in the Olomouc Region
- Vysoká, a village and part of Javorník (Ústí nad Orlicí District) in the Pardubice Region
- Vysoká, a village and part of Jihlava in the Vysočina Region
- Vysoká, a village and part of Kosova Hora in the Central Bohemian Region
- Vysoká, a village and part of Lešná in the Zlín Region
- Vysoká, a village and part of Malá Morava in the Olomouc Region
- Vysoká, a village and part of Málkov (Chomutov District) in the Ústí nad Labem Region
- Vysoká, a village and part of Stará Voda (Cheb District) in the Karlovy Vary Region
- Vysoká, a village and part of Suchdol (Kutná Hora District) in the Central Bohemian Region
- Vysoká u Holic, a village and part of Ostřetín in the South Region

== Slovakia ==
- Vysoká, Banská Štiavnica District, a municipality and village in the Banská Bystrica Region
- Vysoká, Sabinov District, a municipality and village in the Prešov Region
- Vysoká (Little Carpathians), a peak
- Vysoká, a peak in the High Tatras
- Vysoká nad Kysucou, a municipality and village in the Žilina Region
- Vysoká nad Uhom, a municipality and village in the Košice Region
