= Pod Pajštúnom =

Coordinates: 48.27555°N 17.07792°E

- IUCN category IV (habitat/species management area)
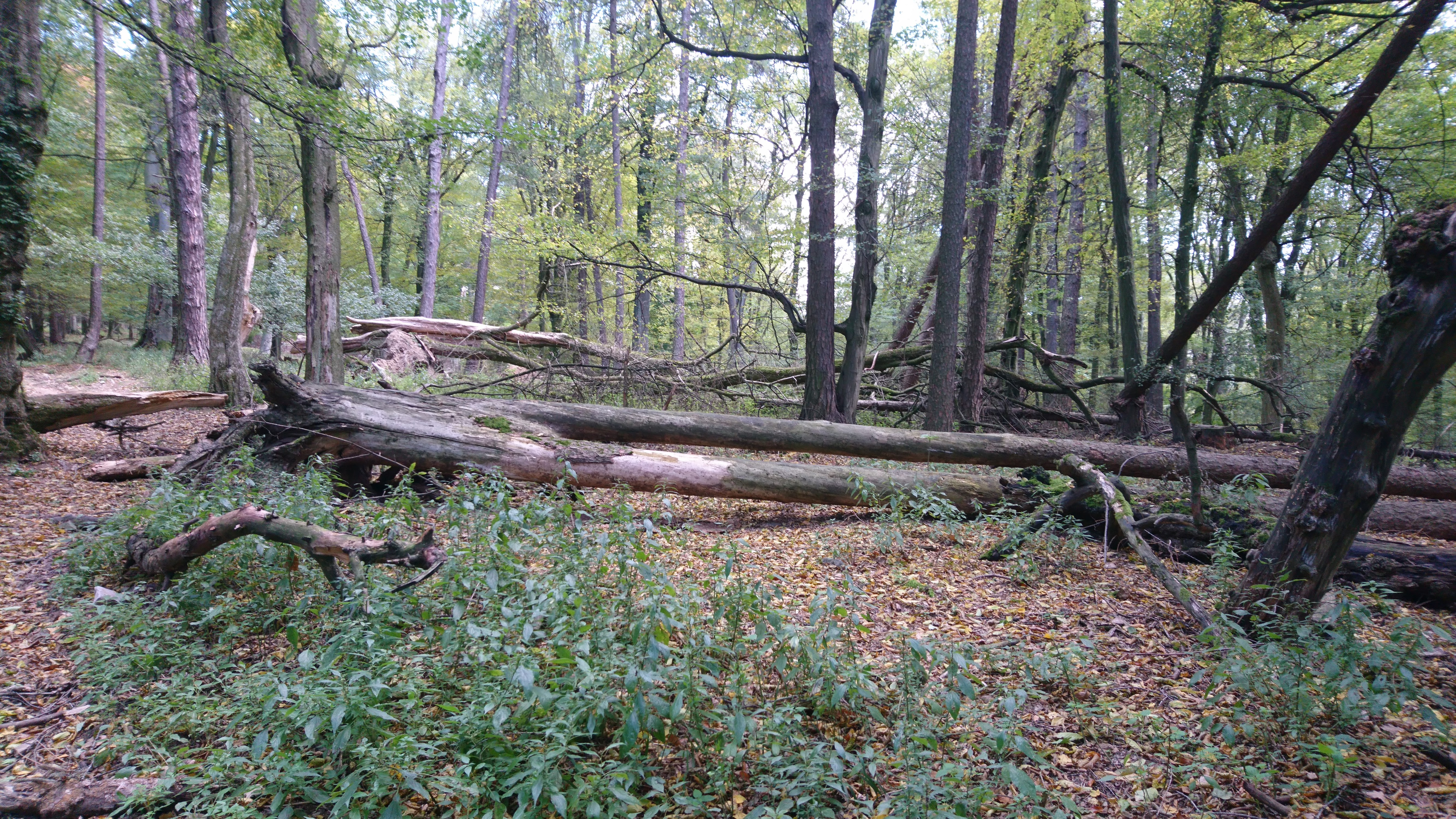
- Forest in the nature reserve
- Interactive map of Pod Pajštúnom
- Area: 1.414197 km^{2} (0.546025 sq mi)
- Established: 1984

Pod Pajštúnom is a nature reserve in the Slovak municipalities of Stupava and Borinka in the Malacky District. The nature reserve covers an area of 141 hectares (350 acres) of forests in the Little Carpathians. It has a protection level of 5 under the Slovak nature protection system. The nature reserve is part of the Little Carpathians Protected Landscape Area.

== Description ==
The nature reserve was created to protect forest communities of beech, oak-hornbeam and lime-maple with their natural species composition and structure as well as the protection of pioneer and subpannonic grass-herb stands on carbonate substrate.
