= Strmina =

Nature reserve in Slovakia

Coordinates: 48.27218°N 17.12667°E

- IUCN category Ia (strict nature reserve)
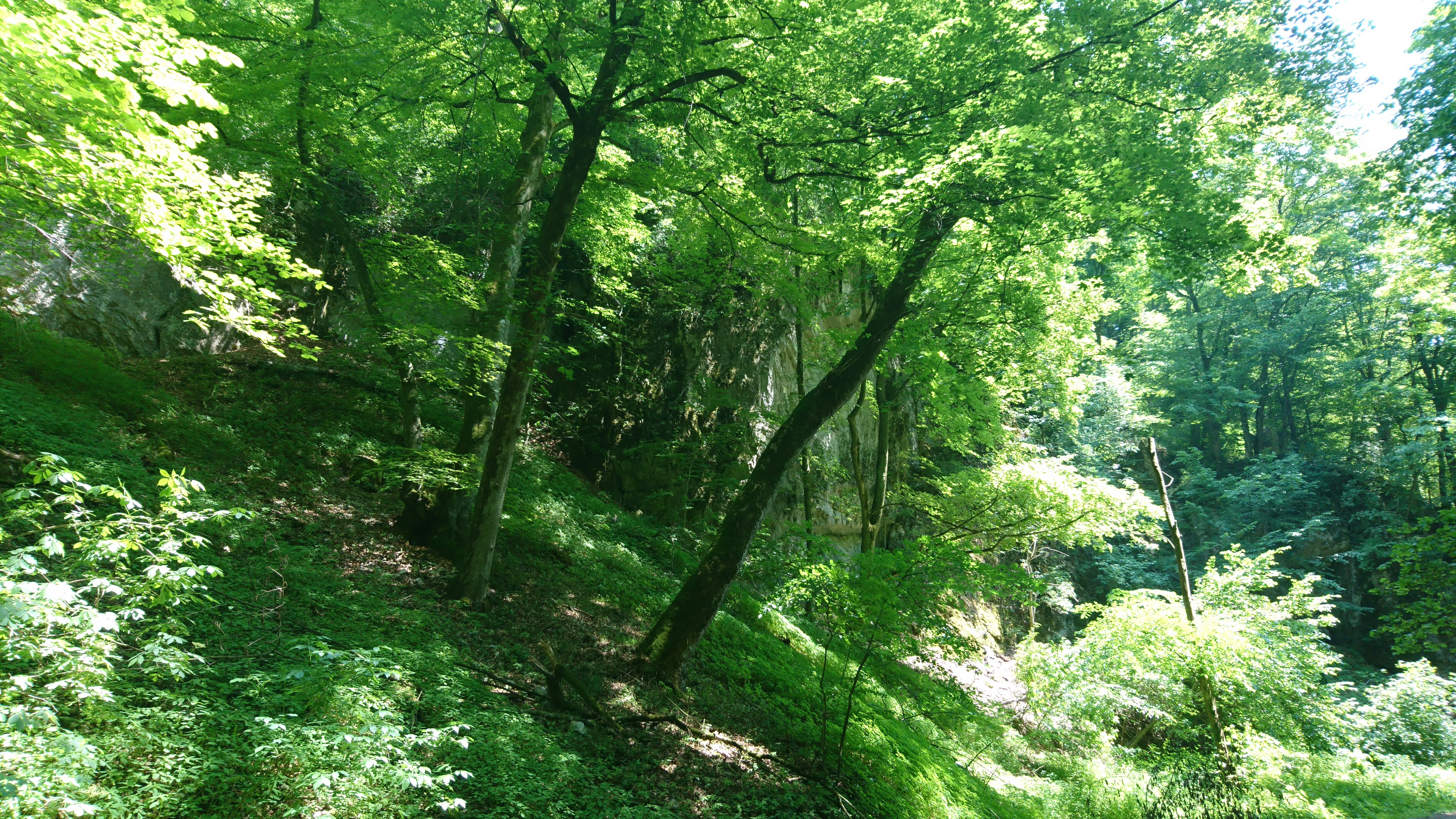
- Forest in the Strmina nature reserve
- Interactive map of Strmina
- Area: 1.9628 km^{2} (0.7578 sq mi)
- Established: 1988

Strmina is a nature reserve in the Slovak municipalities of Stupava and Borinka in the Malacky District. The nature reserve covers an area of 196 hectares (480 acres) of forests in the Little Carpathians. It has a protection level of 5 under the Slovak nature protection system. The nature reserve is part of the Little Carpathians Protected Landscape Area.

== Description ==
The protected area was created to protect the karst forms in this locality and to preserve the flora and fauna communities specific to the Little Carpathians.
