= Vysoká (Little Carpathians) =

Mountain in Slovakia

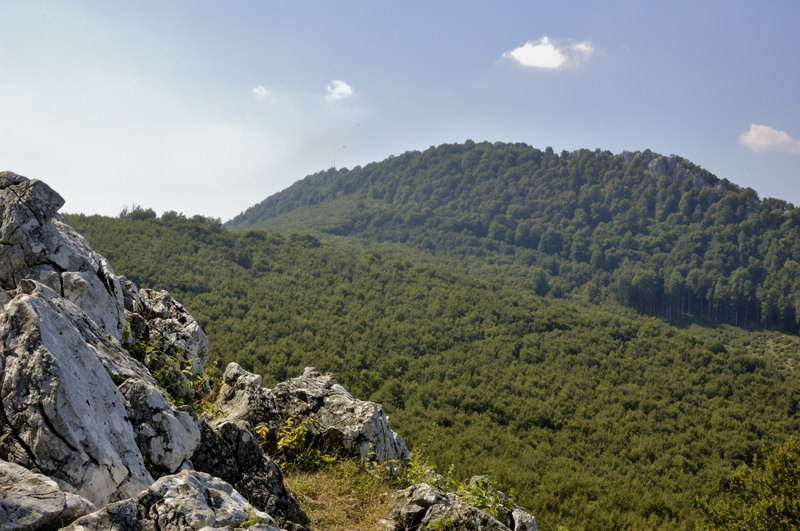
- Vysoká as seen from Taricové skaly

Highest point
- Elevation: 754 m (2,474 ft)
- Coordinates: 48°25′4.69″N 17°13′13.84″E

Geography
- Location within Slovakia
- Location: Kuchyňa
- Parent range: Little Carpathians

Climbing
- Easiest route: from Zochova chata

Vysoká is the second-highest mountain in the Little Carpathians mountains, part of the Carpathians mountain range, located in the municipality of Kuchyňa in Slovakia. The mountain is part of the Vysoká Nature Reserve. The 754-meter (2,474 ft) AMSL high peak offers views of the surrounding Little Carpathians' relief, Tribeč mountains, Považský Inovec and Podunajská pahorkatina. On a fine day, it offers views of extended parts of landscape with even the Austrian Alps being clearly visible.

== Description ==
The mountain offers numerous gorges, streams, meadows and rocky faces. The surrounding woods feature several small caves. In the past, limestone was mined underneath the mountain and transported to a nearby factory. The woods are rich in fauna, notably the mouflon.

The mountain is located within the Vysoká Nature Reserve, a protected area with the highest, fifth degree of protection. The nature reserve was established in 1988 with the area of 80.53 ha within the administrative areas of the municipalities of Kuchyňa and Rohožník. The nature reserve is part of the Little Carpathians Protected Landscape Area.

== Approach ==
Usual points of departure for a one-day trip are Zochova chata and Kuchyňa. There are many popular tourism locations nearby (observation tower Veľká homoľa, Červený Kameň Castle, Štúr's way and others).

== See also ==
- Záruby
- Geography of Slovakia
