= Jurské jazero =

Nature reserve in Slovakia

- IUCN category IV (habitat/species management area)
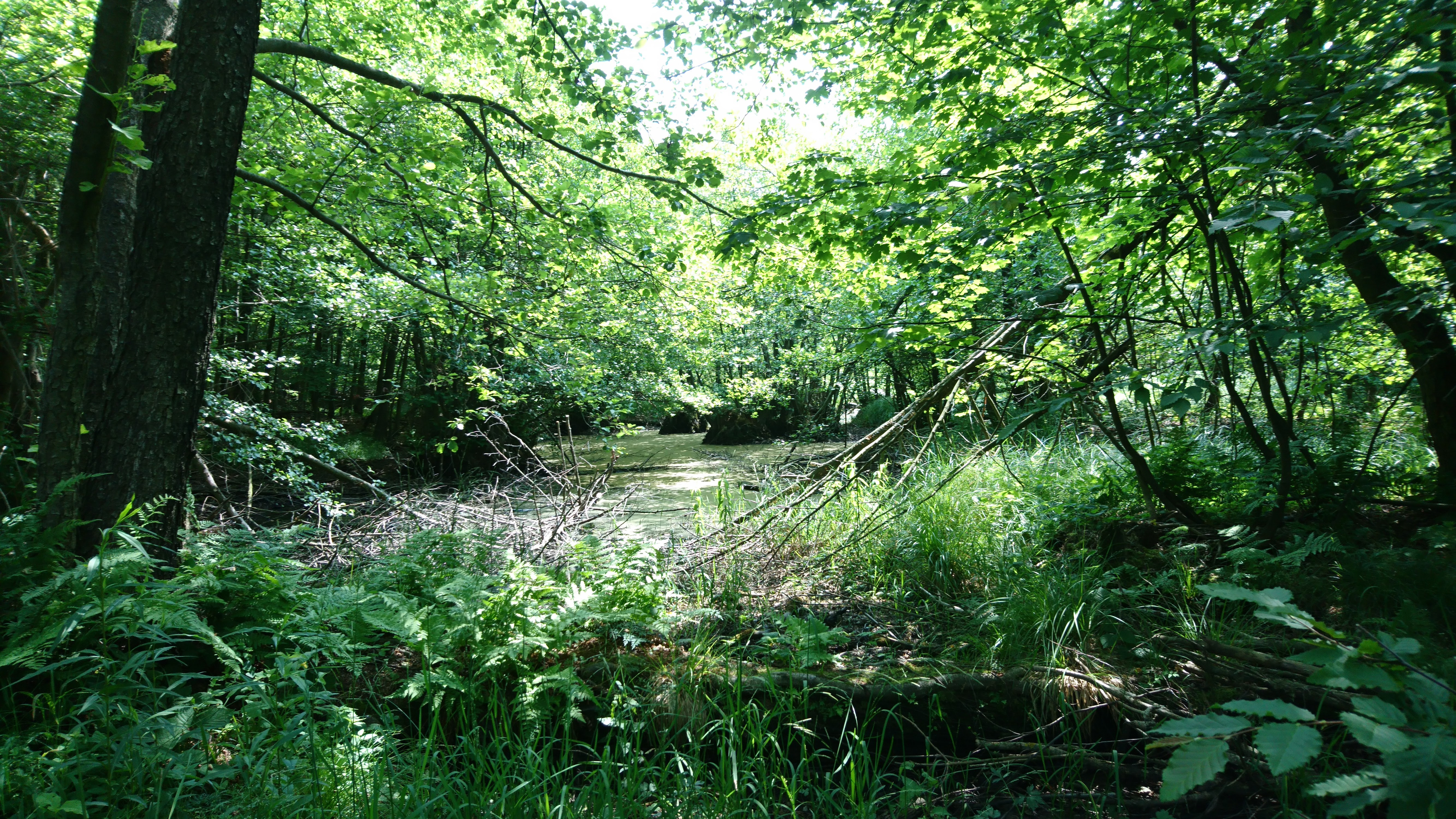
- Interactive map of Jurské jazero
- Area: 02,749 km^{2} (1,061 sq mi)
- Established: 1988

Jurské jazero is a nature reserve in the Slovak municipality of Svätý Jur in the Bratislava region. The area is located at am altitude of 550m above sea level in the south-western part of the Little Carpathians. Jurské jazero covers an area of 27,49 ha between the summits of Malý Javorník and Velký Javorník.

Jurské jazero was declared as a protected area for the protection of birch-alder and mountain peat bog communities in the Little Carpathians.
