= Ostrý Kameň Castle =

Castle ruins in Slovakia

- Buková, Slovakia
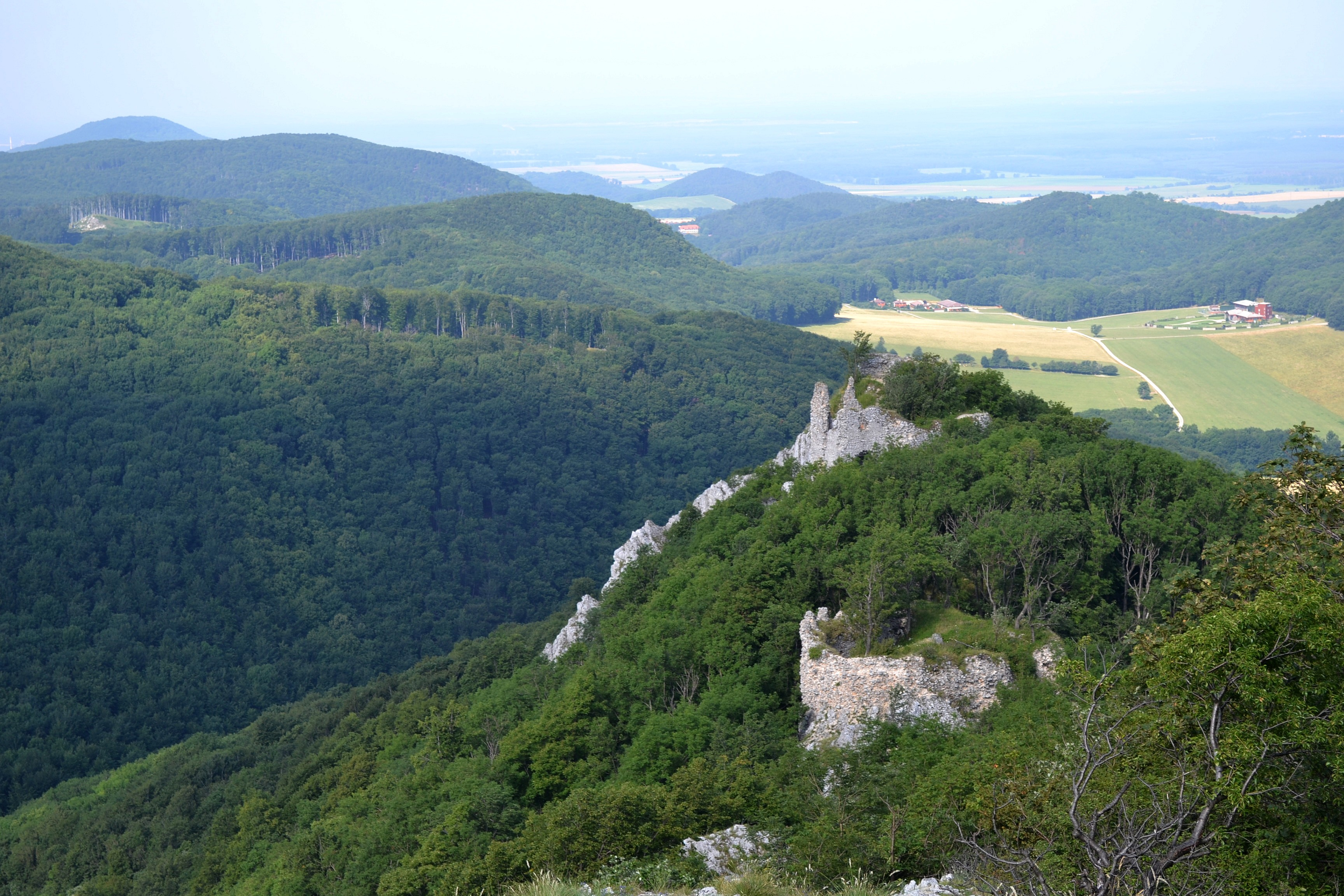
- View on the castle ruins from Záruby.

Site information
- Condition: Ruined

Location
- Location in Slovakia
- Coordinates: 48.521858°N 17.371110°E

Site history
- Built: 13th century
- Materials: Limestone
- Demolished: 18th century

Ostrý Kameň Castle (German: Scharfenstein; Hungarian: Éleskő) is a ruined castle in the municipality of Buková in the Trnava region of Slovakia.

== History ==
The castle was first mentioned in 1273. Although the origins of the Ostrý Kameň castle are not clear, it is believed that it was built in the 13th century. The goal of building this royal border fort on the western border of the Hungarian Kingdom was the protection of the important trade route connecting Buda with Prague in the Middle Ages, the so-called Czech Road. This trading route passed the barrier that the Little Carpathians posed via the depression of the valley Bukovská Brázda situated directly below the castle.

Originally a royal property, the castle was passed into private property in 1366 when it came in the hands of Hungarian feudal families. In 1394 Stibor of Stiboricz became the owner of te Ostrý Kameň castle. After his noble family died out the castle was in the hands of different successive owners. At the turn of the 15th and 16th century the castle became the hereditary property of the brothers Imre Czobor and Márton Czobor. At that time the castle served no longer as a guarding fort but rather as the economic and defensive center of a much larger estate. In the spring of 1539 Imrich's son, Gáspár Czobor, died and left behind a wife with five children and a substantial debt to the Bakič and Révay magnates families. A feud over the ownership of the castle started between the three families, which was complicated by marriages between the different families and investments by the Bakič family in the renovation and completion of the castle. The trial to settle the feud was only ended in 1554 after the direct intervention of emperor Charles V. Four years later the three families divided the estate between themselves: half of Ostrý Kameň stayed with the Czobor family, the other half was given to the Bakič and Révay families.

The Ostrý Kameň estate was ultimately split at the end of the 18th century due to more marriages, feuds and other transactions. In the end it became property of the Pálffy family who transferred the seat of the estate to Morvaszentjános. As no one was interested in the restoration of the castle which was already damaged during the Rákóczi's War of Independence, the castle slowly started to fall into decay. It was also the time when Buková and surroundings suffered from passing armies on the trade road as well as local robbers. Robbery flourished especially in the first half of the 18th century with one of the legendary robbers being Hrajnoha.

== Architecture ==
The original castle was actually a small fortress situated in the northern part of the castle area. It was located in the topmost spot of the rock ridge and was protected by steep precipices from which it obtained its later name Sharp Stone.

An oblong building joined with a prismatic tower with an entrance gate formed the original fortress. Gradually a forecastle with auxiliary buildings and a water cistern were added to the castle. At the turn of the 15th to the 16th century the safety of the castle was increased by building a bulky fortress in the foreground, on the rock behind the moat. With the increasing risk of Ottoman raids the Ostrý Kameň castle was expanded with a second forecastle with a circular corner bastion. In the second half of the 16th century additional forecastles were added. Today only some fragments of walls of three bastions are left although there were also auxiliary buildings, residential buildings, storerooms, a bakery and a forge erected on the castle grounds.

== Flora ==
The castle area and the rocks surrounding it are an important area for the occurrence of relict flora.
