= Velká Buková =

- Municipality
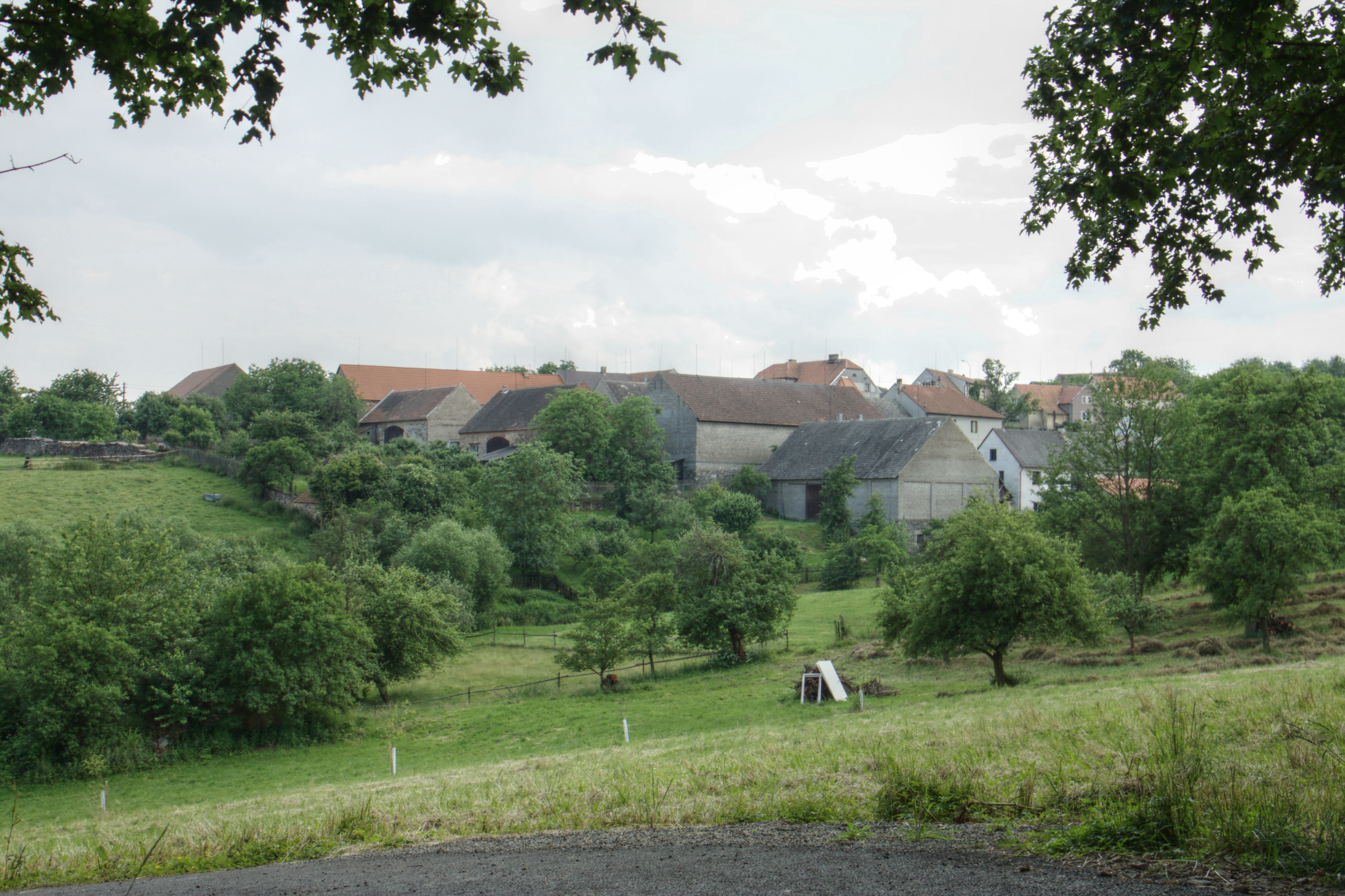
- Houses in Velká Buková

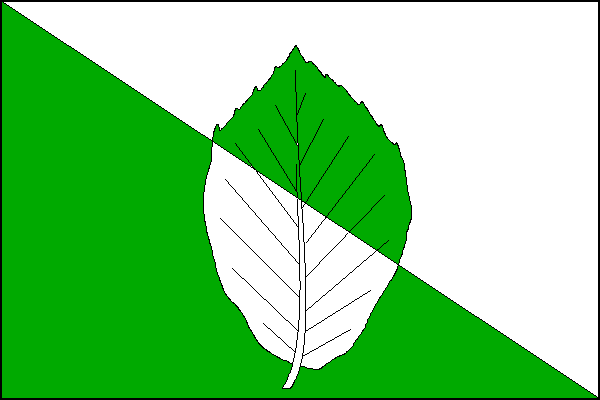
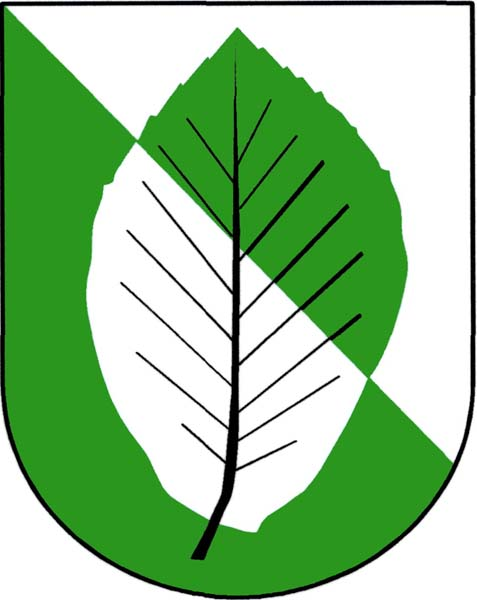
- Flag Coat of arms

- Location in the Czech Republic
- Coordinates: 50°2′5″N 13°50′50″E
- Country: Czech Republic
- Region: Central Bohemian
- District: Rakovník
- First mentioned: 1386

Area
  - Total: 13.53 km^{2} (5.22 sq mi)
- Elevation: 435 m (1,427 ft)

Population (2026-01-01)
  - Total: 279
  - Density: 20.6/km^{2} (53.4/sq mi)
- Time zone: UTC+1 (CET)
  - Summer (DST): UTC+2 (CEST)
- Postal code: 270 23
- Website: www.velkabukova.cz

Velká Buková is a municipality and village in Rakovník District in the Central Bohemian Region of the Czech Republic. It has about 300 inhabitants.

== Administrative division ==
Velká Buková consists of three municipal parts (in brackets population according to the 2021 census):

- Velká Buková (267)
- Kalubice (12)
- Malá Buková (19)

== Demographics ==
Historical population
Year	Pop.	±%
1869	705	—
1880	635	−9.9%
1890	774	+21.9%
1900	750	−3.1%
1910	647	−13.7%
1921	581	−10.2%
1930	537	−7.6%
1950	404	−24.8%
1961	380	−5.9%
1970	346	−8.9%
1980	302	−12.7%
1991	237	−21.5%
2001	251	+5.9%
2011	234	−6.8%
2021	298	+27.4%
Source: Censuses
