= Mezholezy (former Domažlice District) =

- Municipality
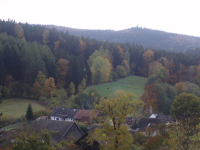
- General view

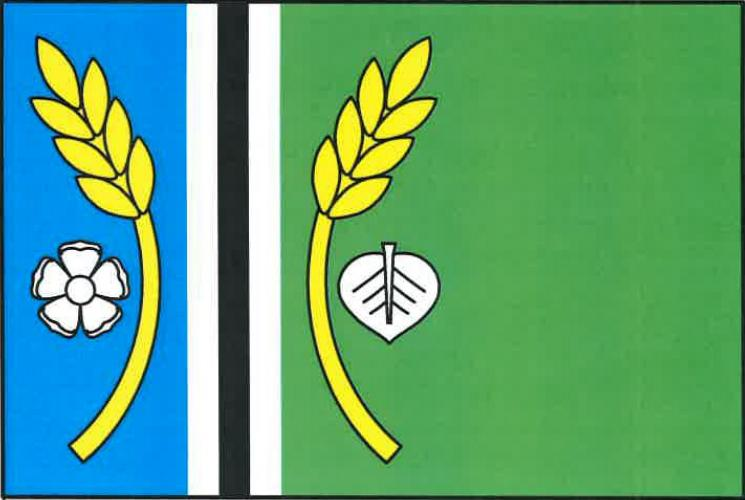
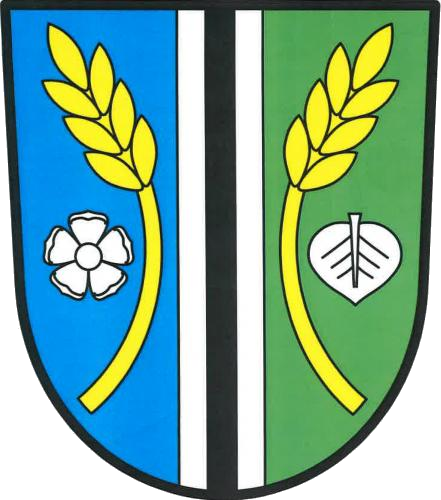
- Flag Coat of arms

- Location in the Czech Republic
- Coordinates: 49°24′43″N 13°6′14″E
- Country: Czech Republic
- Region: Plzeň
- District: Domažlice
- First mentioned: 1379

Area
  - Total: 3.71 km^{2} (1.43 sq mi)
- Elevation: 532 m (1,745 ft)

Population (2026-01-01)
  - Total: 116
  - Density: 31.3/km^{2} (81.0/sq mi)
- Time zone: UTC+1 (CET)
  - Summer (DST): UTC+2 (CEST)
- Postal code: 345 06
- Website: mezholezy.cz

Mezholezy is a municipality and village in Domažlice District in the Plzeň Region of the Czech Republic. It has about 100 inhabitants.

Mezholezy lies approximately 14 kilometres (9 mi) east of Domažlice, 43 km (27 mi) south-west of Plzeň, and 121 km (75 mi) south-west of Prague.

== Demographics ==
Historical population
Year	Pop.	±%
1869	346	—
1880	331	−4.3%
1890	324	−2.1%
1900	330	+1.9%
1910	288	−12.7%
1921	302	+4.9%
1930	291	−3.6%
1950	174	−40.2%
1961	167	−4.0%
1970	137	−18.0%
1980	120	−12.4%
1991	98	−18.3%
2001	107	+9.2%
2011	65	−39.3%
2021	124	+90.8%
Source: Censuses
