= Buková, Trnava District =

Buková
- Municipality
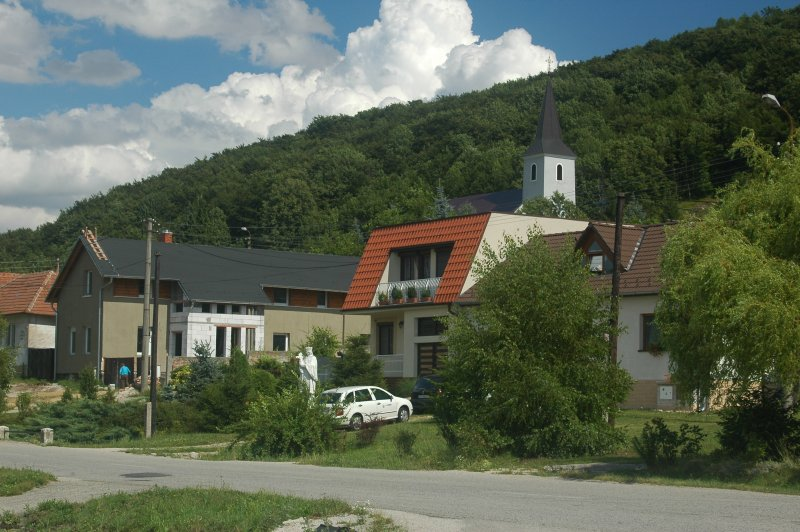

- Flag

- Location of Buková in the Trnava Region Location of Buková in Slovakia
- Coordinates: 48°32′52″N 17°23′42″E
- Country: Slovakia
- Region: Trnava Region
- District: Trnava District
- First mentioned: 1256

Area
  - Total: 24.29 km^{2} (9.38 sq mi)
- Elevation: 310 m (1,020 ft)

Population (2025)
  - Total: 665
- Time zone: UTC+1 (CET)
  - Summer (DST): UTC+2 (CEST)
- Postal code: 919 10
- Area code: +421 33
- Vehicle registration plate (until 2022): TT
- Website: www.bukova.sk

Buková (Hungarian: Bikszárd) is a village and municipality of Trnava District in the Trnava region, Slovakia. The village is located in the Little Carpathians and Buková reservoir is located nearby. The surrounding is a natural protected area. Near the village center are the ruins of the Ostrý Kameň Castle.

== See also ==
- List of municipalities and towns in Slovakia

== Population ==
Population statistic (10 years)
Year	1995	2005	2015	2025
Count	720	665	658	665
Difference		−7.63%	−1.05%	+1.06%

Population statistic
Year	2024	2025
Count	667	665
Difference		−0.29%

It has a population of 665 people (31 December 2025).

=== Ethnicity ===
Census 2021 (1+ %)
Ethnicity	Number	Fraction
Slovak	620	96.57%
Not found out	13	2.02%
Czech	8	1.24%
Total	642	

In year 2021 was 642 people by ethnicity 620 as Slovak, 13 as Not found out, 8 as Czech, 5 as Polish, 2 as Jewish, 1 as Ukrainian, 1 as Russian, 1 as Austrian, 1 as Croatian and 1 as English.

Note on population: The difference values of population numbers in the table "Population statistic" and in the sections "Ethnicity" & "Religion" is caused by the use of various statistical methods.

=== Religion ===
Census 2021 (1+ %)
Religion	Number	Fraction
Roman Catholic Church	466	72.59%
None	118	18.38%
Not found out	30	4.67%
Evangelical Church	8	1.25%
Total	642	

In year 2021 was 642 people by religion 466 from Roman Catholic Church, 118 from None, 30 from Not found out, 8 from Evangelical Church, 6 from Christian Congregations in Slovakia, 3 from Calvinist Church, 3 from Other and not ascertained christian church, 3 from Greek Catholic Church, 2 from Ad hoc movements, 1 from Eastern Orthodox Church, 1 from Paganism and natural spirituality and 1 from Other.

== Genealogical resources ==
The records for genealogical research are available at the state archive "Statny Archiv in Bratislava, Slovakia"

- Roman Catholic church records (births/marriages/deaths): 1787-1900 (parish A)
