= Buková (Plzeň-South District) =

- Municipality
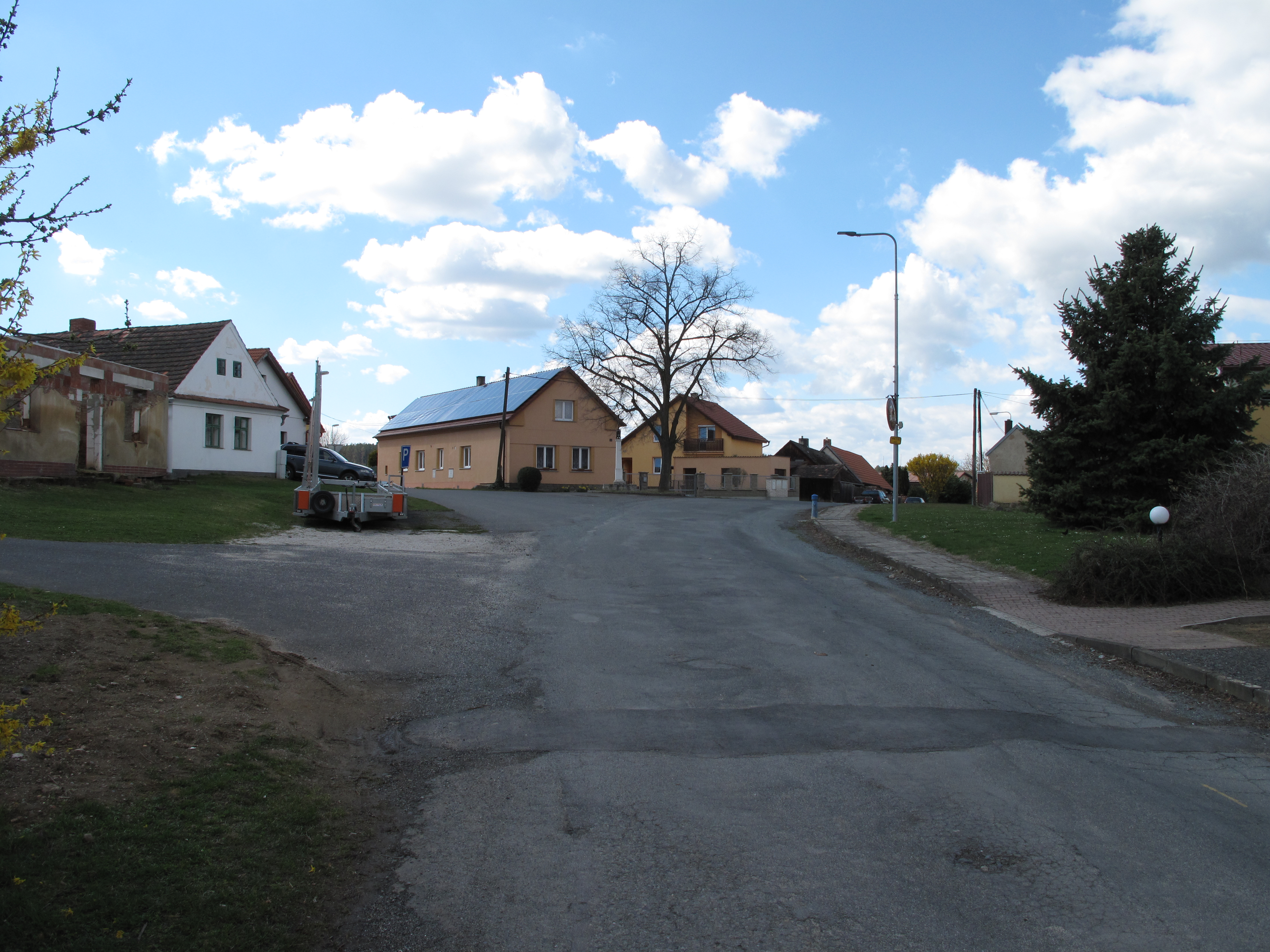
- Main street

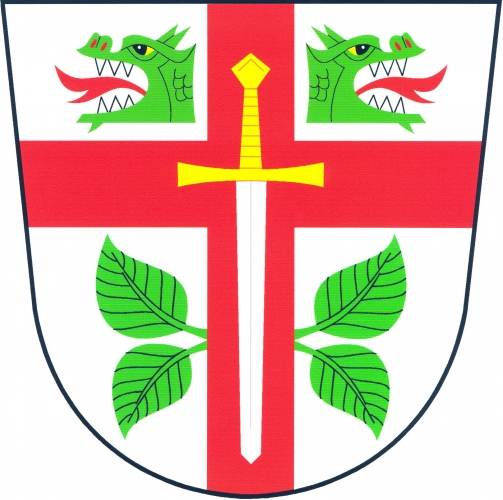
- Flag Coat of arms

- Location in the Czech Republic
- Coordinates: 49°32′15″N 13°9′32″E
- Country: Czech Republic
- Region: Plzeň
- District: Plzeň-South
- First mentioned: 1115

Area
  - Total: 6.16 km^{2} (2.38 sq mi)
- Elevation: 443 m (1,453 ft)

Population (2026-01-01)
  - Total: 253
  - Density: 41.1/km^{2} (106/sq mi)
- Time zone: UTC+1 (CET)
  - Summer (DST): UTC+2 (CEST)
- Postal code: 334 52
- Website: www.obec-bukova.cz

Buková is a municipality and village in Plzeň-South District in the Plzeň Region of the Czech Republic. It has about 300 inhabitants.

== Etymology ==
The Czech word buková (from buk, i.e. 'beech') is an adjective that originally designated the place (slope, hill, etc.) near which the village was founded.

== Geography ==
Buková is located about 27 kilometres (17 mi) southwest of Plzeň. It lies mostly in the Švihov Highlands, only the southern part of the municipal territory lies in the Plasy Uplands. The highest point is the hill Srnčí vrch at 535 m (1,755 ft) above sea level. The Merklínka Stream flows through the municipality. The fishpond Kačerna is built here on the stream.

== History ==
The first written mention of Buková is from 1115, when Duke Vladislaus I donated the village to the monastery in Kladruby. Until the Thirty Years' War (1618–1648), Buková was a prospering village with fishponds, a mill and a brewery. After the war, only twelve homesteads remained in the village. Until 1674, Buková was the centre of a separate estate, owned by various lesser nobles. In 1674, Jakub Filip Berchtold purchased it and annexed it to his Merklín estate.

At the turn of the 19th and 20th centuries, Buková's population grew thanks to coal mining in the nearby forests.

== Demographics ==
Historical population

Year	Pop.	±%
1869	467	—
1880	454	−2.8%
1890	486	+7.0%
1900	536	+10.3%
1910	588	+9.7%

Year	Pop.	±%
1921	616	+4.8%
1930	537	−12.8%
1950	373	−30.5%
1961	363	−2.7%
1970	307	−15.4%

Year	Pop.	±%
1980	259	−15.6%
1991	231	−10.8%
2001	197	−14.7%
2011	231	+17.3%
2021	255	+10.4%

Source: Censuses

== Transport ==
There are no railways or major roads passing through the municipality.

== Sights ==
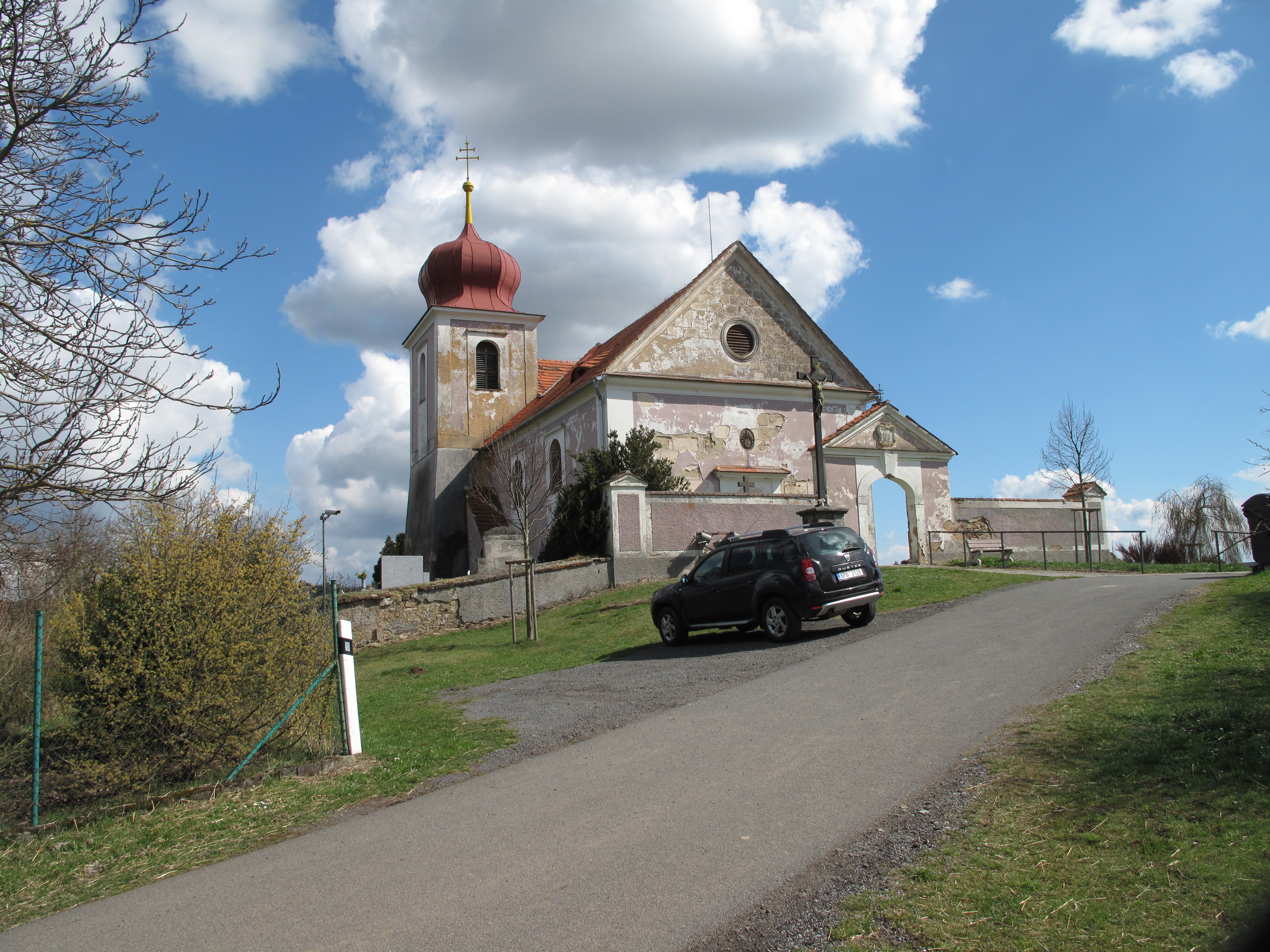
Church of Saint George

The main landmark of Buková is the Church of Saint George. It was built in the Gothic style in the middle of the 14th century, but it was rebuilt in the Renaissance style in the second half of the 16th century and further modified in the following centuries in the Baroque and Neoclassical styles.
