= Vysoká (Svitavy District) =

- Municipality
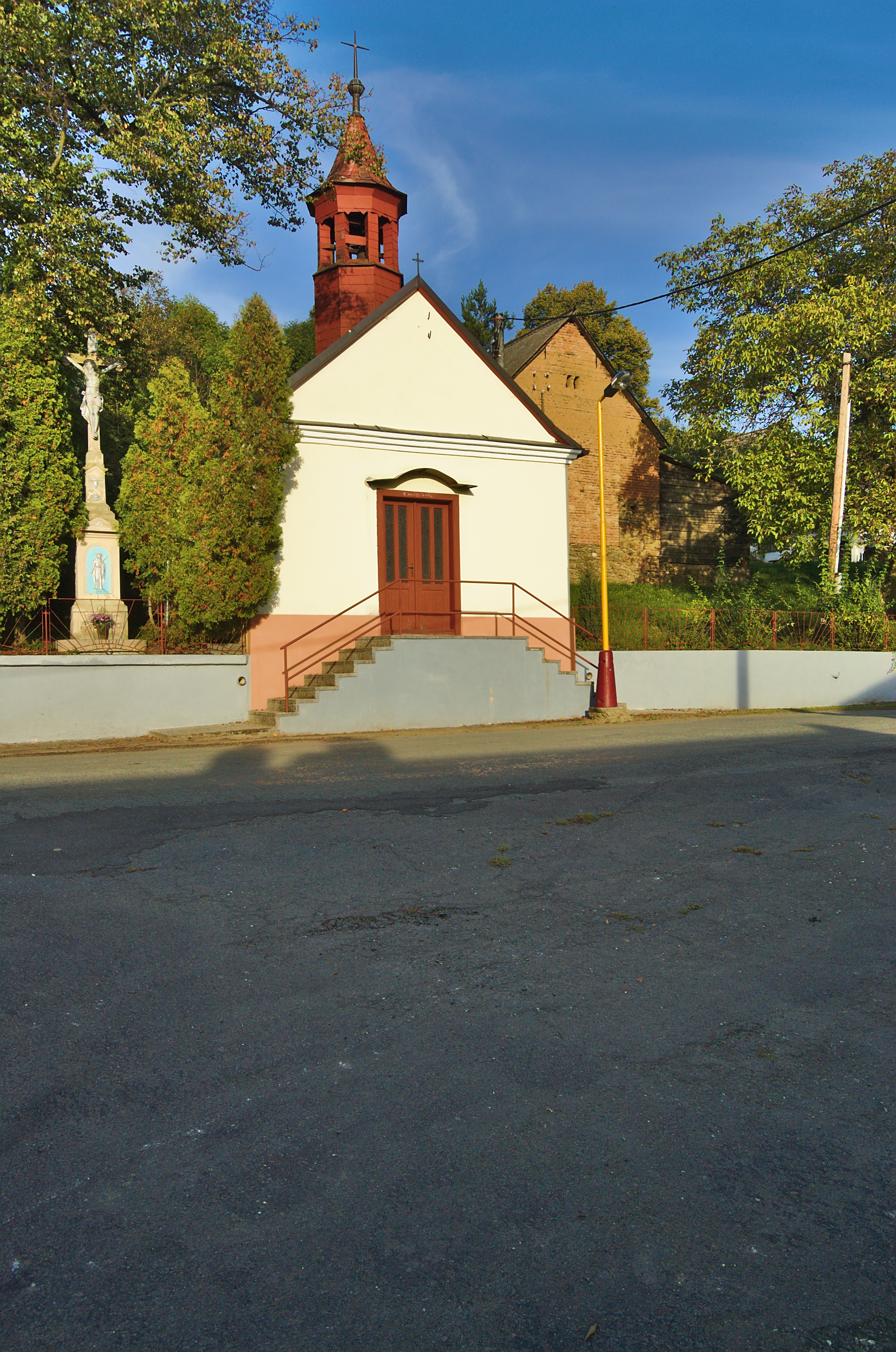
- Chapel of the Holy Trinity

- Location in the Czech Republic
- Coordinates: 49°39′49″N 16°48′36″E
- Country: Czech Republic
- Region: Pardubice
- District: Svitavy
- Founded: 1729

Area
  - Total: 2.88 km^{2} (1.11 sq mi)
- Elevation: 562 m (1,844 ft)

Population (2026-01-01)
  - Total: 43
  - Density: 15/km^{2} (39/sq mi)
- Time zone: UTC+1 (CET)
  - Summer (DST): UTC+2 (CEST)
- Postal code: 569 43
- Website: vysoka.net

Vysoká is a municipality and village in Svitavy District in the Pardubice Region of the Czech Republic. It has about 40 inhabitants.

Vysoká lies approximately 27 kilometres (17 mi) east of Svitavy, 85 km (53 mi) south-east of Pardubice, and 178 km (111 mi) east of Prague.

== Demographics ==
Historical population
Year	Pop.	±%
1869	149	—
1880	152	+2.0%
1890	139	−8.6%
1900	125	−10.1%
1910	131	+4.8%
1921	123	−6.1%
1930	98	−20.3%
1950	66	−32.7%
1961	73	+10.6%
1970	68	−6.8%
1980	45	−33.8%
1991	42	−6.7%
2001	36	−14.3%
2011	41	+13.9%
2021	42	+2.4%
Source: Censuses
