= Nová Buková =

- Municipality
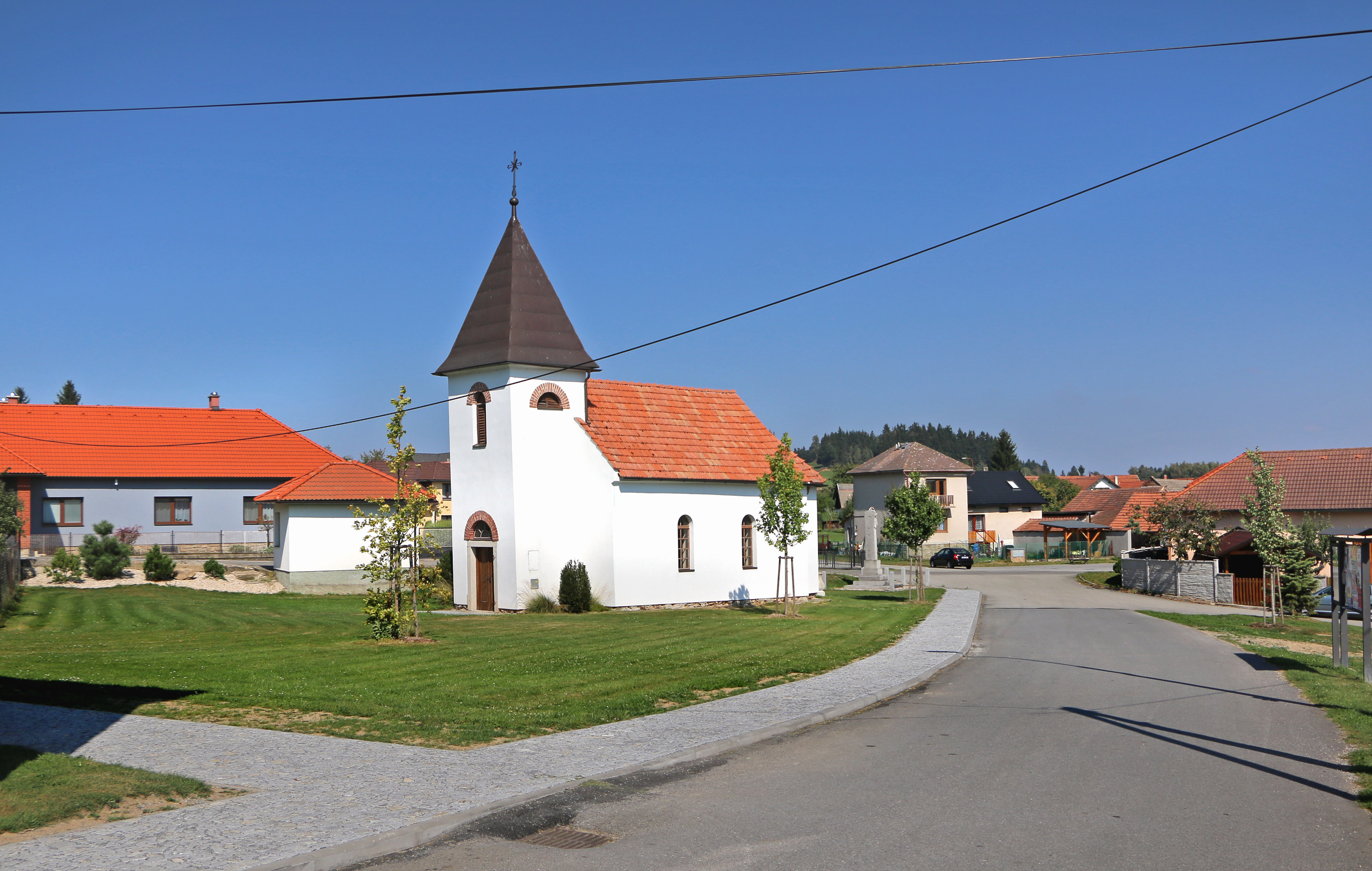
- Chapel in the centre of Nová Buková

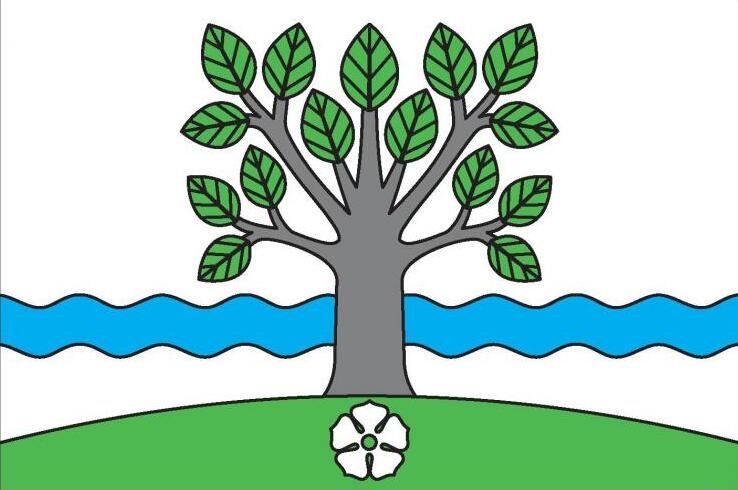
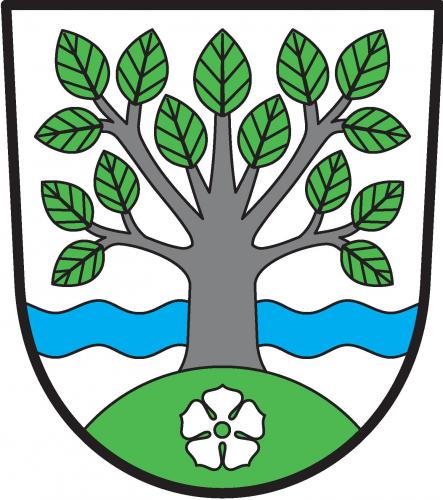
- Flag Coat of arms

- Location in the Czech Republic
- Coordinates: 49°20′46″N 15°17′49″E
- Country: Czech Republic
- Region: Vysočina
- District: Pelhřimov
- First mentioned: 1203

Area
  - Total: 5.16 km^{2} (1.99 sq mi)
- Elevation: 671 m (2,201 ft)

Population (2026-01-01)
  - Total: 121
  - Density: 23.4/km^{2} (60.7/sq mi)
- Time zone: UTC+1 (CET)
  - Summer (DST): UTC+2 (CEST)
- Postal code: 393 01
- Website: www.novabukova.cz

Nová Buková is a municipality and village in Pelhřimov District in the Vysočina Region of the Czech Republic. It has about 100 inhabitants.

Nová Buková lies approximately 11 kilometres (7 mi) south-east of Pelhřimov, 23 km (14 mi) west of Jihlava, and 104 km (65 mi) south-east of Prague.

== Demographics ==
Historical population
Year	Pop.	±%
1869	302	—
1880	314	+4.0%
1890	313	−0.3%
1900	258	−17.6%
1910	262	+1.6%
1921	287	+9.5%
1930	252	−12.2%
1950	190	−24.6%
1961	153	−19.5%
1970	136	−11.1%
1980	114	−16.2%
1991	82	−28.1%
2001	86	+4.9%
2011	96	+11.6%
2021	129	+34.4%
Source: Censuses
