= Řemíčov =

- Municipality
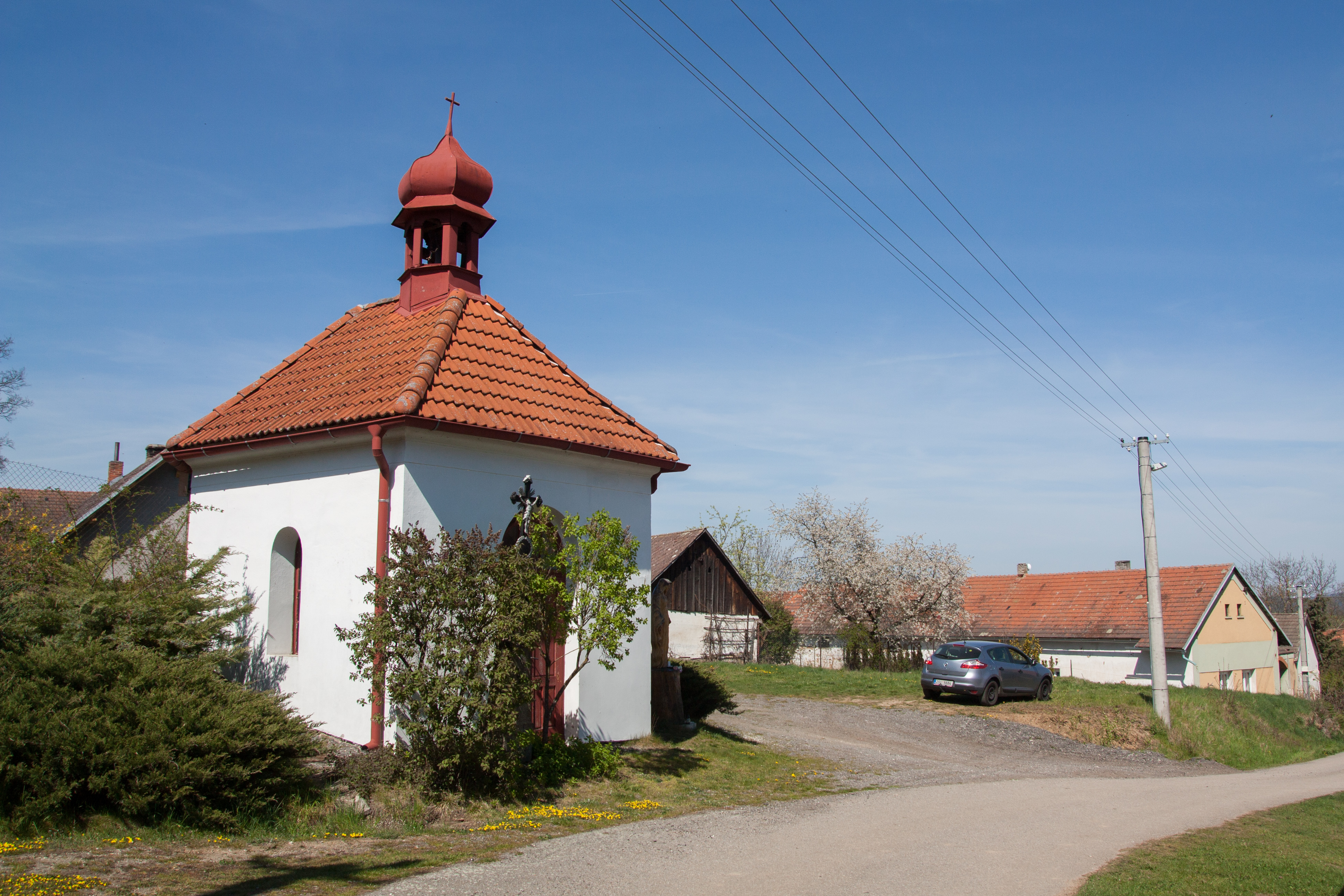
- Buková, a part of Řemíčov

- Flag Coat of arms

- Location in the Czech Republic
- Coordinates: 49°31′30″N 14°46′30″E
- Country: Czech Republic
- Region: South Bohemian
- District: Tábor
- First mentioned: 1456

Area
  - Total: 4.33 km^{2} (1.67 sq mi)
- Elevation: 500 m (1,600 ft)

Population (2026-01-01)
  - Total: 106
  - Density: 24.5/km^{2} (63.4/sq mi)
- Time zone: UTC+1 (CET)
  - Summer (DST): UTC+2 (CEST)
- Postal code: 391 43
- Website: www.remicov.cz

Řemíčov is a municipality and village in Tábor District in the South Bohemian Region of the Czech Republic. It has about 100 inhabitants.

Řemíčov lies approximately 14 kilometres (9 mi) north-east of Tábor, 64 km (40 mi) north of České Budějovice, and 69 km (43 mi) south of Prague.

== Administrative division ==
Řemíčov consists of two municipal parts (in brackets population according to the 2021 census):

- Řemíčov (84)
- Buková (15)

== Demographics ==
Historical population
Year	Pop.	±%
1869	331	—
1880	352	+6.3%
1890	353	+0.3%
1900	297	−15.9%
1910	310	+4.4%
1921	281	−9.4%
1930	260	−7.5%
1950	177	−31.9%
1961	164	−7.3%
1970	156	−4.9%
1980	107	−31.4%
1991	102	−4.7%
2001	88	−13.7%
2011	64	−27.3%
2021	99	+54.7%
Source: Censuses
