= Pravonín =

- Municipality
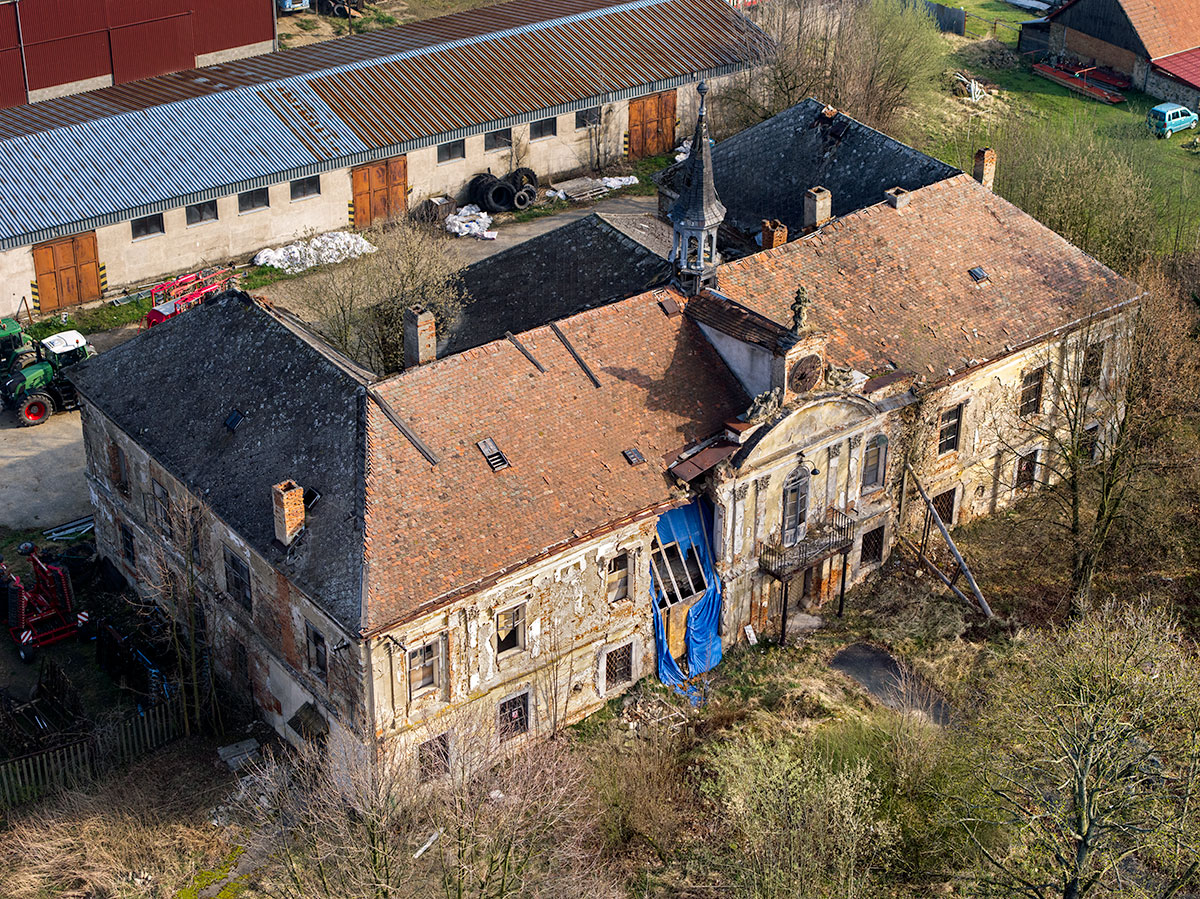
- Castle ruins

- Flag Coat of arms

- Location in the Czech Republic
- Coordinates: 49°38′8″N 14°56′36″E
- Country: Czech Republic
- Region: Central Bohemian
- District: Benešov
- First mentioned: 1352

Area
  - Total: 19.79 km^{2} (7.64 sq mi)
- Elevation: 540 m (1,770 ft)

Population (2026-01-01)
  - Total: 570
  - Density: 29/km^{2} (75/sq mi)
- Time zone: UTC+1 (CET)
  - Summer (DST): UTC+2 (CEST)
- Postal codes: 257 08, 257 09
- Website: www.pravonin.cz

Pravonín is a municipality and village in Benešov District in the Central Bohemian Region of the Czech Republic. It has about 600 inhabitants.

== Administrative division ==
Pravonín consists of seven municipal parts (in brackets population according to the 2021 census):

- Pravonín (346)
- Buková (42)
- Karhule (39)
- Křížov (98)
- Lesáky (2)
- Tisek (40)
- Volavka (1)

== Demographics ==
Historical population
Year	Pop.	±%
1869	1,547	—
1880	1,460	−5.6%
1890	1,393	−4.6%
1900	1,333	−4.3%
1910	1,363	+2.3%
1921	1,307	−4.1%
1930	1,191	−8.9%
1950	919	−22.8%
1961	883	−3.9%
1970	768	−13.0%
1980	653	−15.0%
1991	556	−14.9%
2001	542	−2.5%
2011	549	+1.3%
2021	568	+3.5%
Source: Censuses
