= Buková u Příbramě =

- Municipality
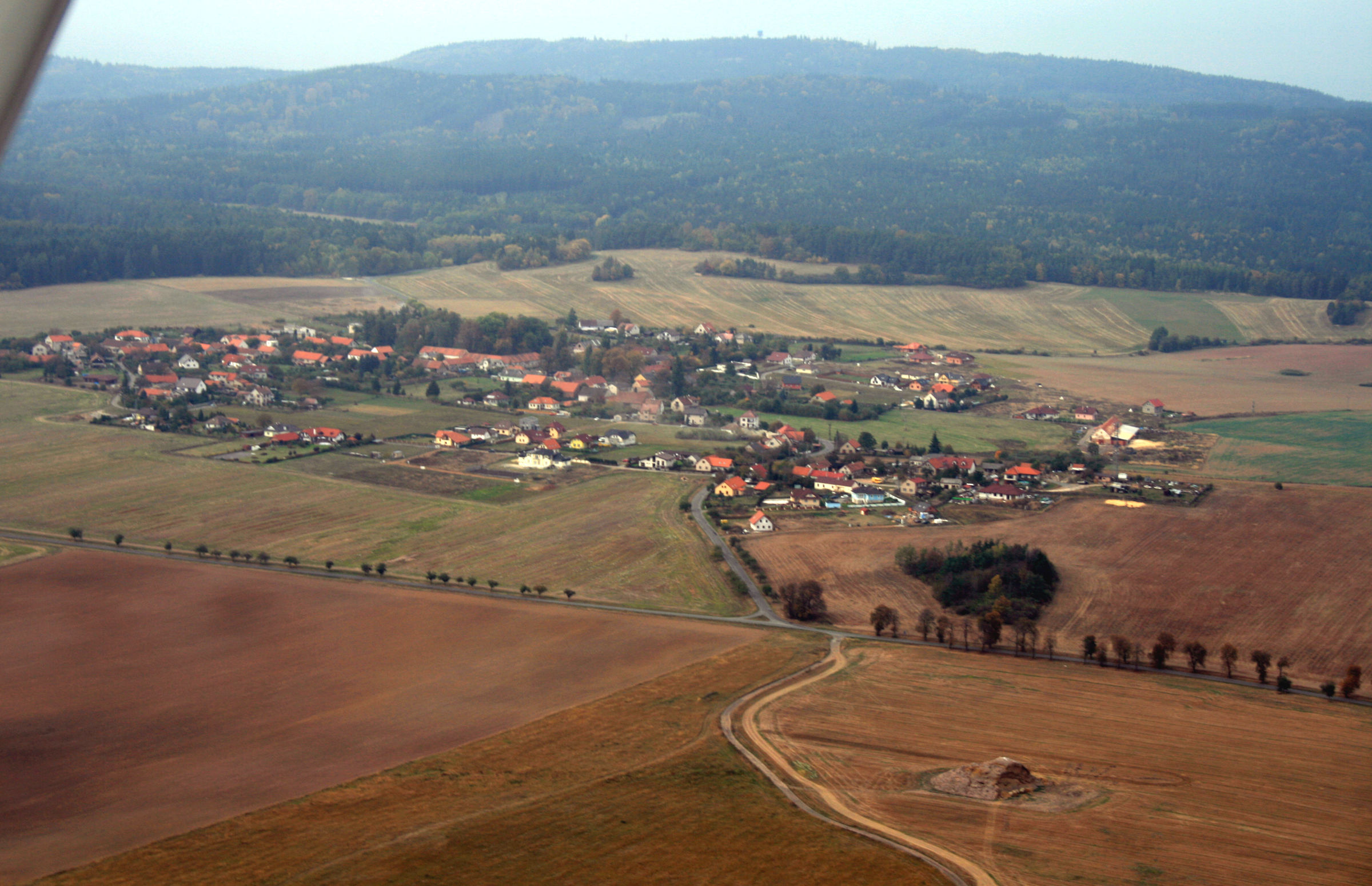
- Aerial view

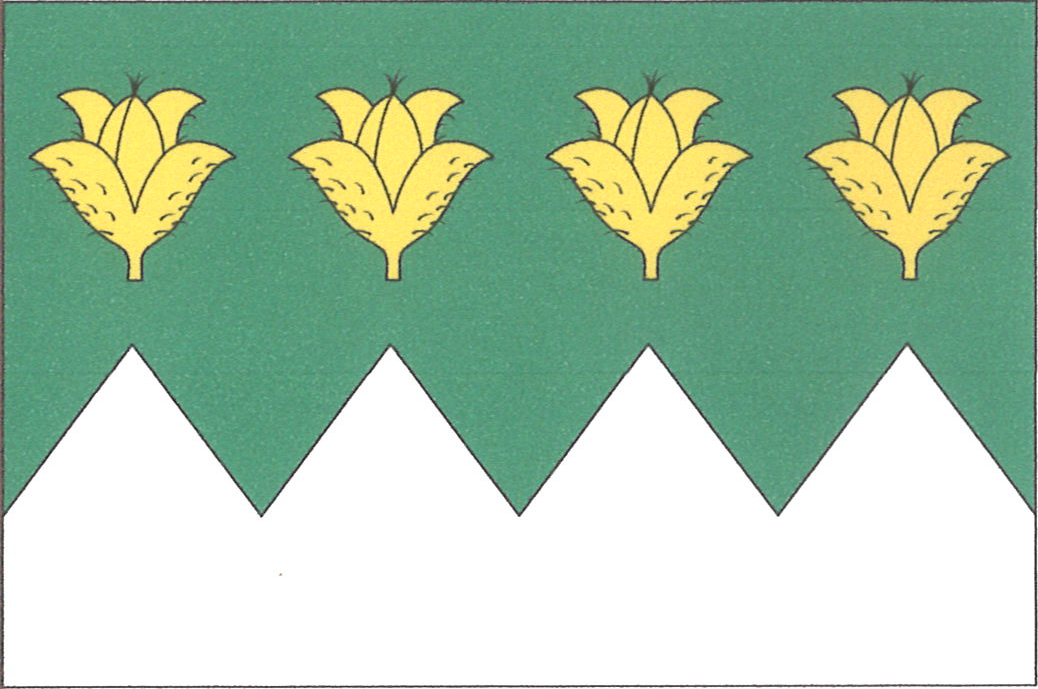
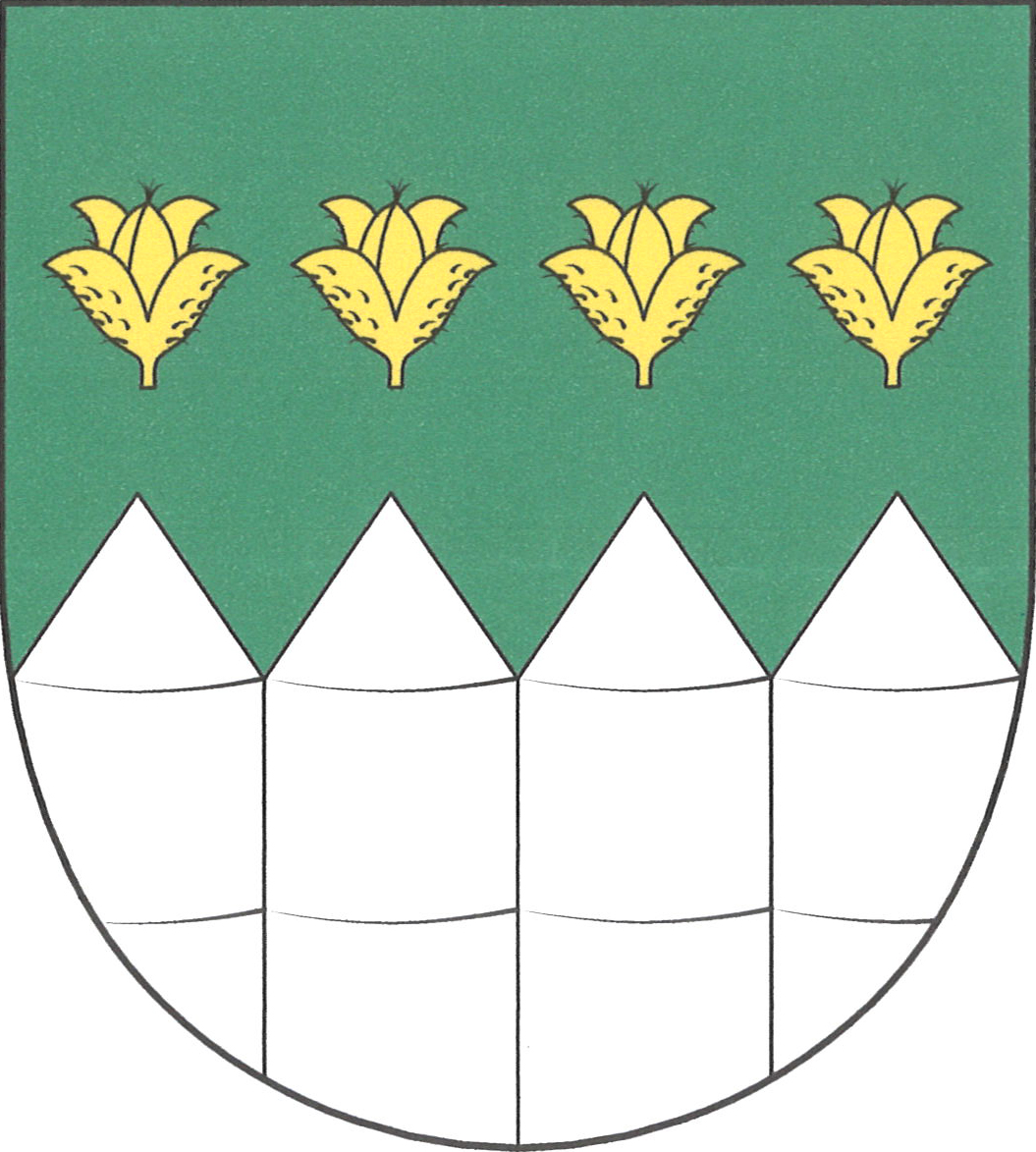
- Flag Coat of arms

- Location in the Czech Republic
- Coordinates: 49°45′19″N 14°4′0″E
- Country: Czech Republic
- Region: Central Bohemian
- District: Příbram
- First mentioned: 1336

Area
  - Total: 7.82 km^{2} (3.02 sq mi)
- Elevation: 487 m (1,598 ft)

Population (2026-01-01)
  - Total: 459
  - Density: 58.7/km^{2} (152/sq mi)
- Time zone: UTC+1 (CET)
  - Summer (DST): UTC+2 (CEST)
- Postal code: 262 23
- Website: www.bukova.net

Buková u Příbramě is a municipality and village in Příbram District in the Central Bohemian Region of the Czech Republic. It has about 500 inhabitants.

== Etymology ==
Buková is a common Czech toponym. The adjective buková is derived from buk, i.e. 'beech'. The village was founded on the site of a cleared beech forest or near a beech forest.

== Geography ==
Buková u Příbramě is located about 9 kilometres (6 mi) northeast of Příbram and 39 km (24 mi) southwest of Prague. It lies in the Brdy Highlands. The highest point is on the slopes of the hill Kuchyňka at 586 m (1,923 ft) above sea level. The stream Sychrovský potok flows through the municipality. It supplies a fishpond called Vackův.

== History ==
The first written mention of Buková is from 1336, when it was the seat of a local noble family. The most important owners of the village were the Dubský family, who bought it in 1710. They had built here a castle.

== Demographics ==
Historical population

| Year | Pop. | ±% |
|---|---|---|
| 1869 | 426 | — |
| 1880 | 392 | −8.0% |
| 1890 | 407 | +3.8% |
| 1900 | 425 | +4.4% |
| 1910 | 414 | −2.6% |

| Year | Pop. | ±% |
|---|---|---|
| 1921 | 423 | +2.2% |
| 1930 | 389 | −8.0% |
| 1950 | 288 | −26.0% |
| 1961 | 304 | +5.6% |
| 1970 | 386 | +27.0% |

| Year | Pop. | ±% |
|---|---|---|
| 1980 | 331 | −14.2% |
| 1991 | 332 | +0.3% |
| 2001 | 304 | −8.4% |
| 2011 | 284 | −6.6% |
| 2021 | 468 | +64.8% |

Source: Censuses

== Transport ==
There are no railways or major roads passing through the municipality.

== Sights ==
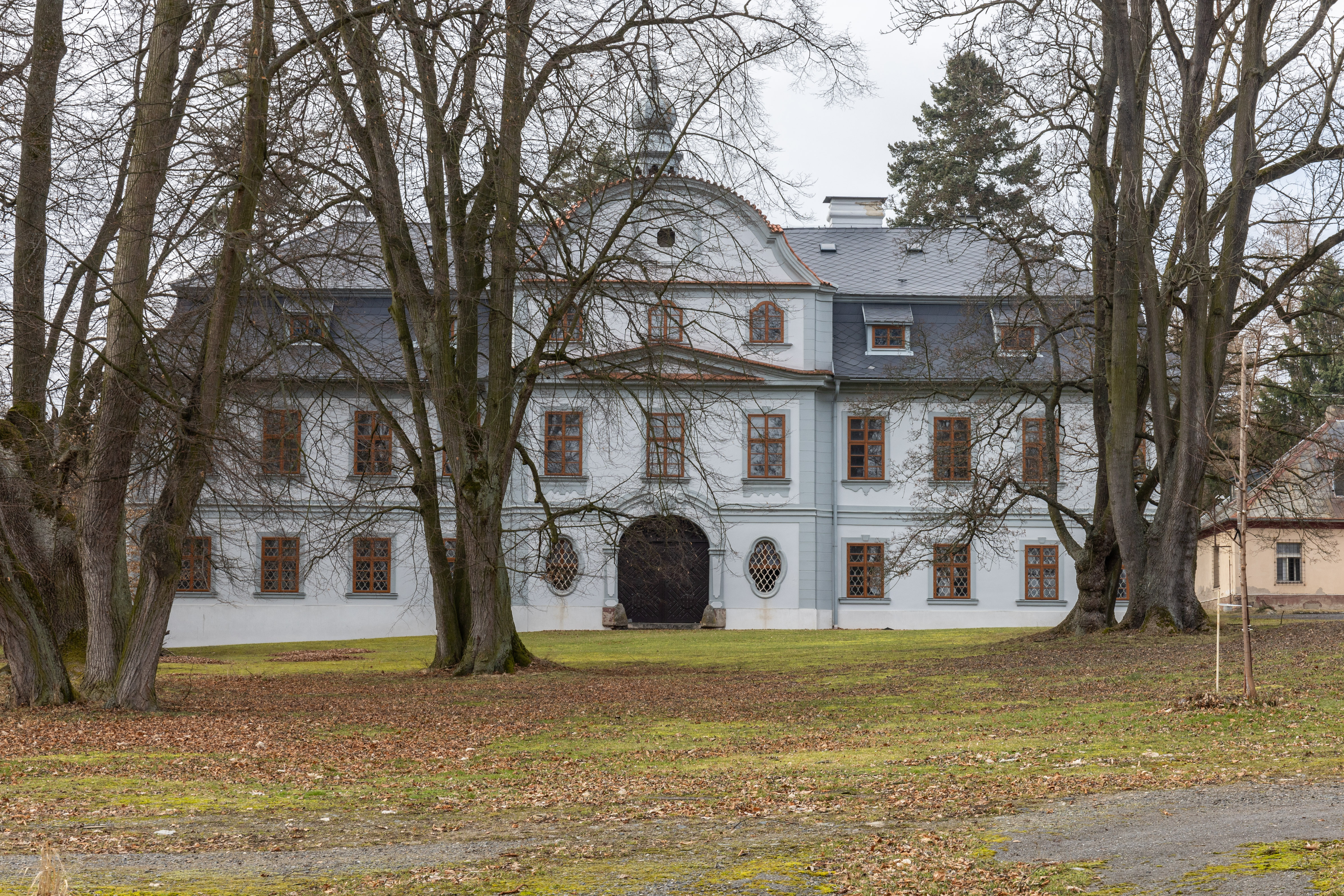
Buková u Příbramě Castle

The main landmark is the Buková u Příbramě Castle. It was built in the Baroque style in 1764. Today it is privately owned and unused.
