= Olešnice (České Budějovice District) =

- Municipality
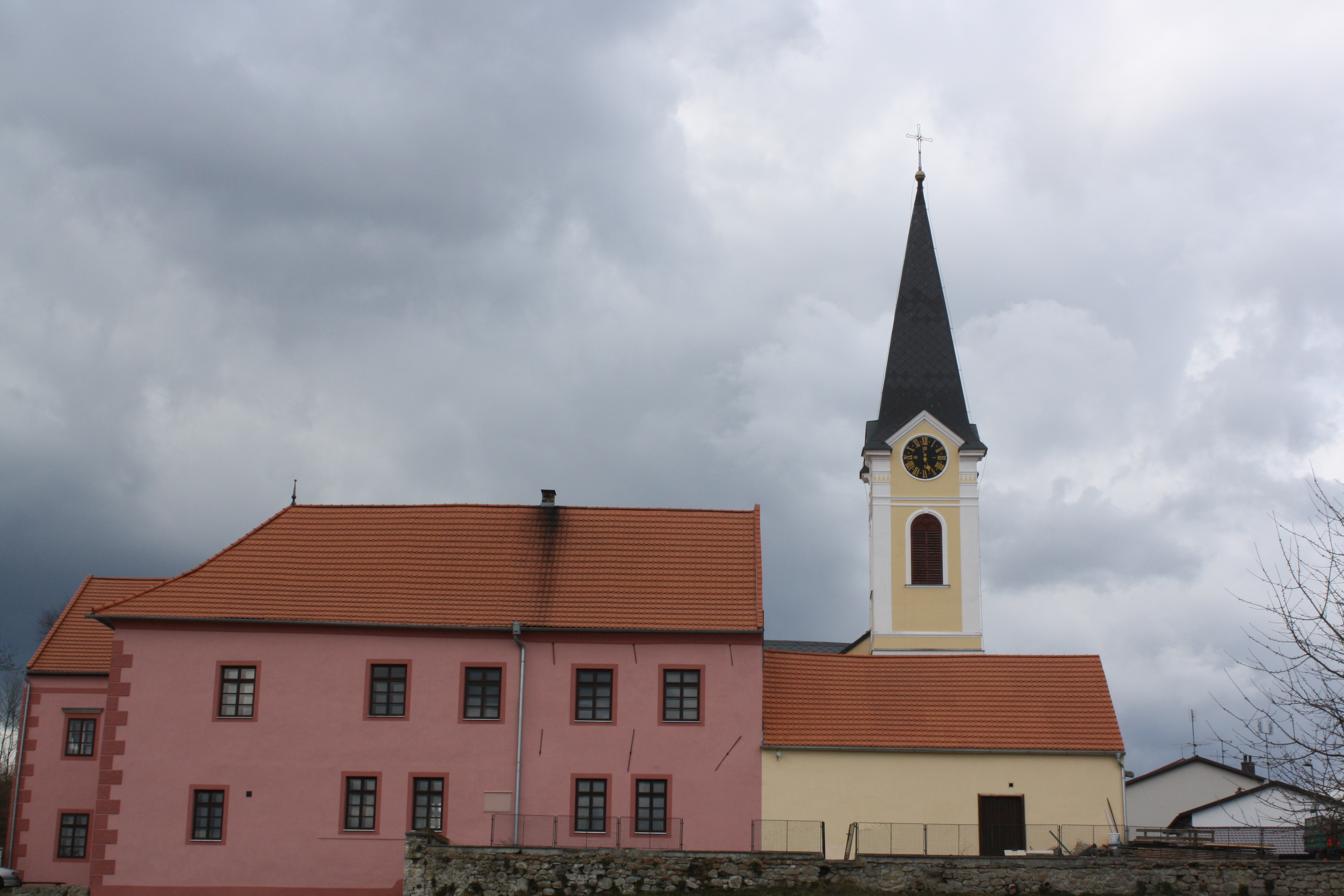
- Olešnice Castle and Church of Saint Wenceslaus

- Location in the Czech Republic
- Coordinates: 48°50′29″N 14°42′17″E
- Country: Czech Republic
- Region: South Bohemian
- District: České Budějovice
- First mentioned: 1186

Area
  - Total: 23.54 km^{2} (9.09 sq mi)
- Elevation: 502 m (1,647 ft)

Population (2026-01-01)
  - Total: 889
  - Density: 37.8/km^{2} (97.8/sq mi)
- Time zone: UTC+1 (CET)
  - Summer (DST): UTC+2 (CEST)
- Postal code: 373 31
- Website: www.olesnice-obec.cz

Olešnice (German: Elexnitz) is a municipality and village in České Budějovice District in the South Bohemian Region of the Czech Republic. It has about 900 inhabitants.

Olešnice lies approximately 23 kilometres (14 mi) south-east of České Budějovice and 140 km (87 mi) south of Prague.

== Administrative division ==
Olešnice consists of three municipal parts (in brackets population according to the 2021 census):

- Olešnice (644)
- Buková (151)
- Lhotka (43)

== History ==
The first written mention of Olešnice is from 1186.

== Demographics ==
Historical population
Year	Pop.	±%
1869	1,179	—
1880	1,183	+0.3%
1890	1,334	+12.8%
1900	1,437	+7.7%
1910	1,525	+6.1%
1921	1,495	−2.0%
1930	1,345	−10.0%
1950	989	−26.5%
1961	1,018	+2.9%
1970	912	−10.4%
1980	768	−15.8%
1991	703	−8.5%
2001	689	−2.0%
2011	770	+11.8%
2021	838	+8.8%
Source: Censuses
