= Záruby =

Mountain in Slovakia

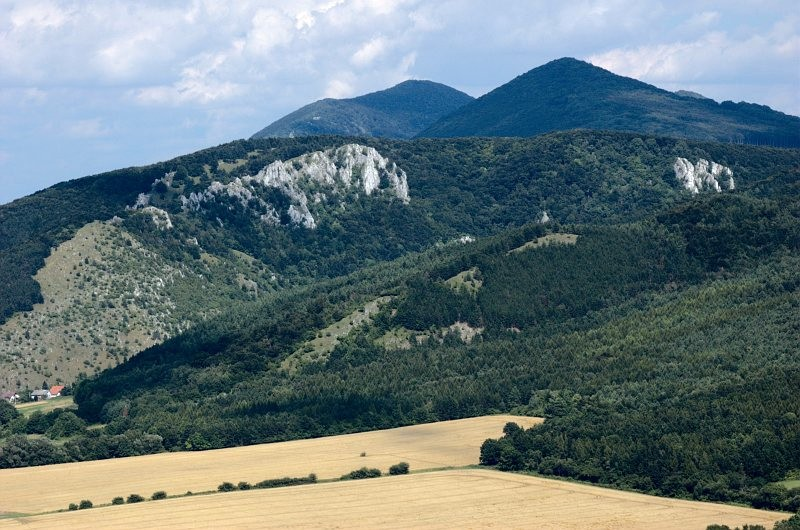
- Záruby, view from Plavecký hrad

Highest point
- Elevation: 768 m (2,520 ft)
- Coordinates: 48°31′25″N 17°23′33″E

Geography
- Location within Slovakia
- Location: Slovakia
- Parent range: Little Carpathians

Záruby is the highest hill of the Little Carpathians in Slovakia. It is located at an altitude of 767 m above sea level, near the village of Smolenice. It is a monoclinal crest.

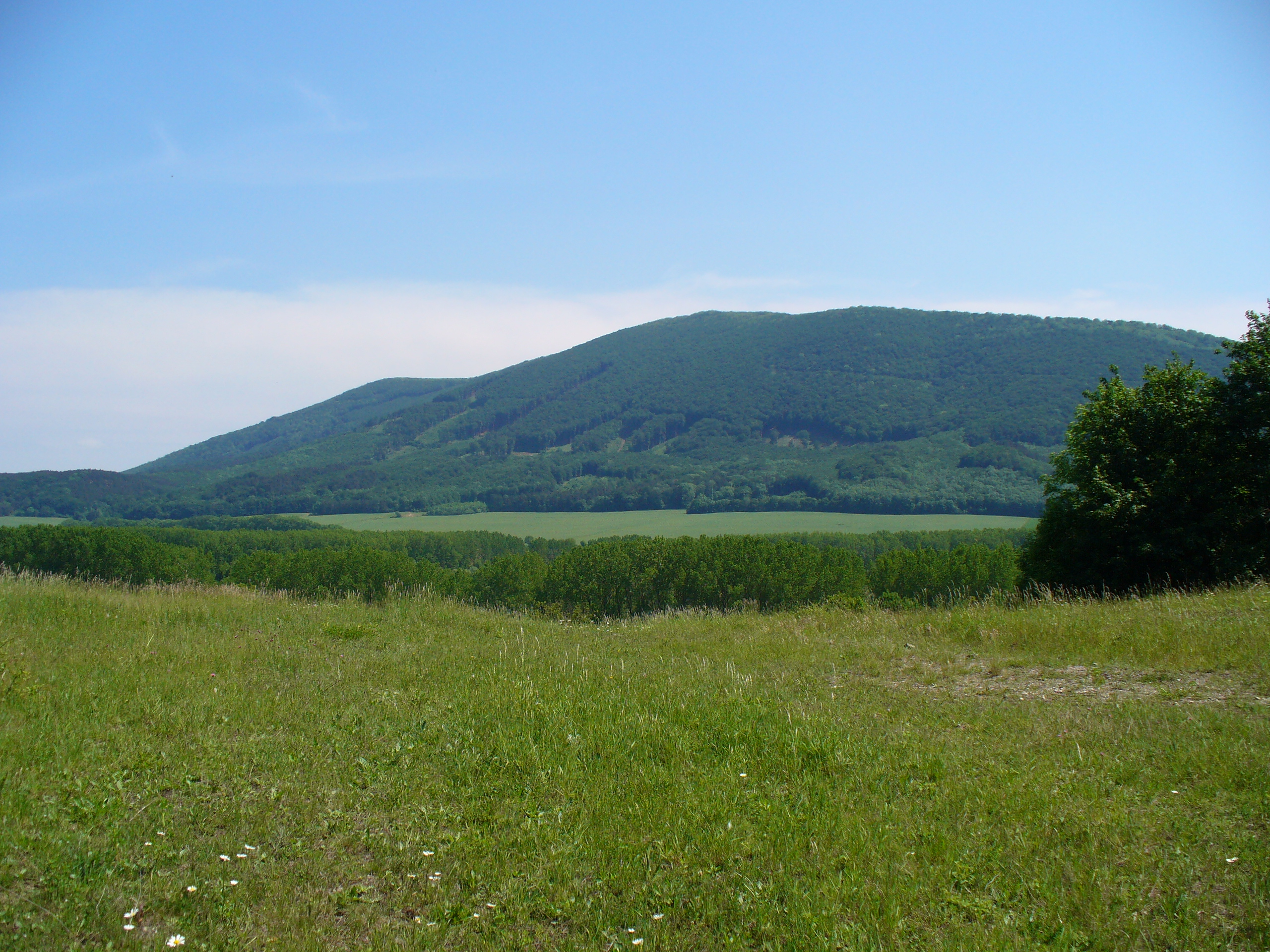
Záruby as seen from the west

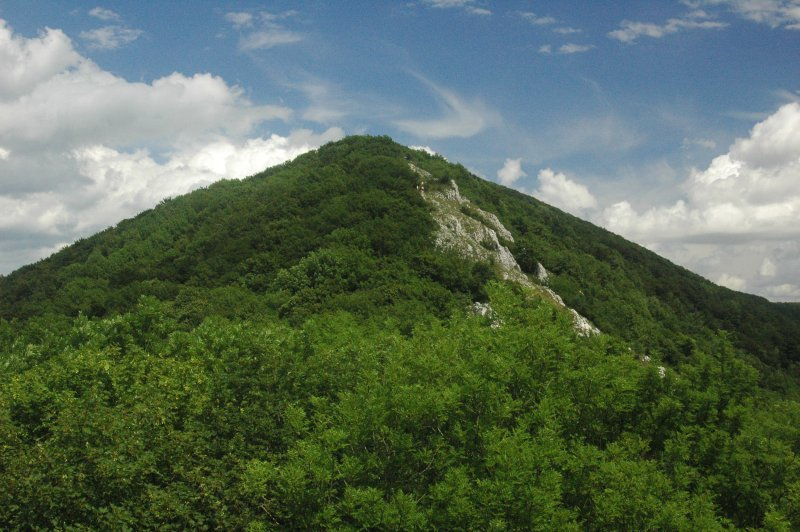
Summit from Ostrý Kameň Castle

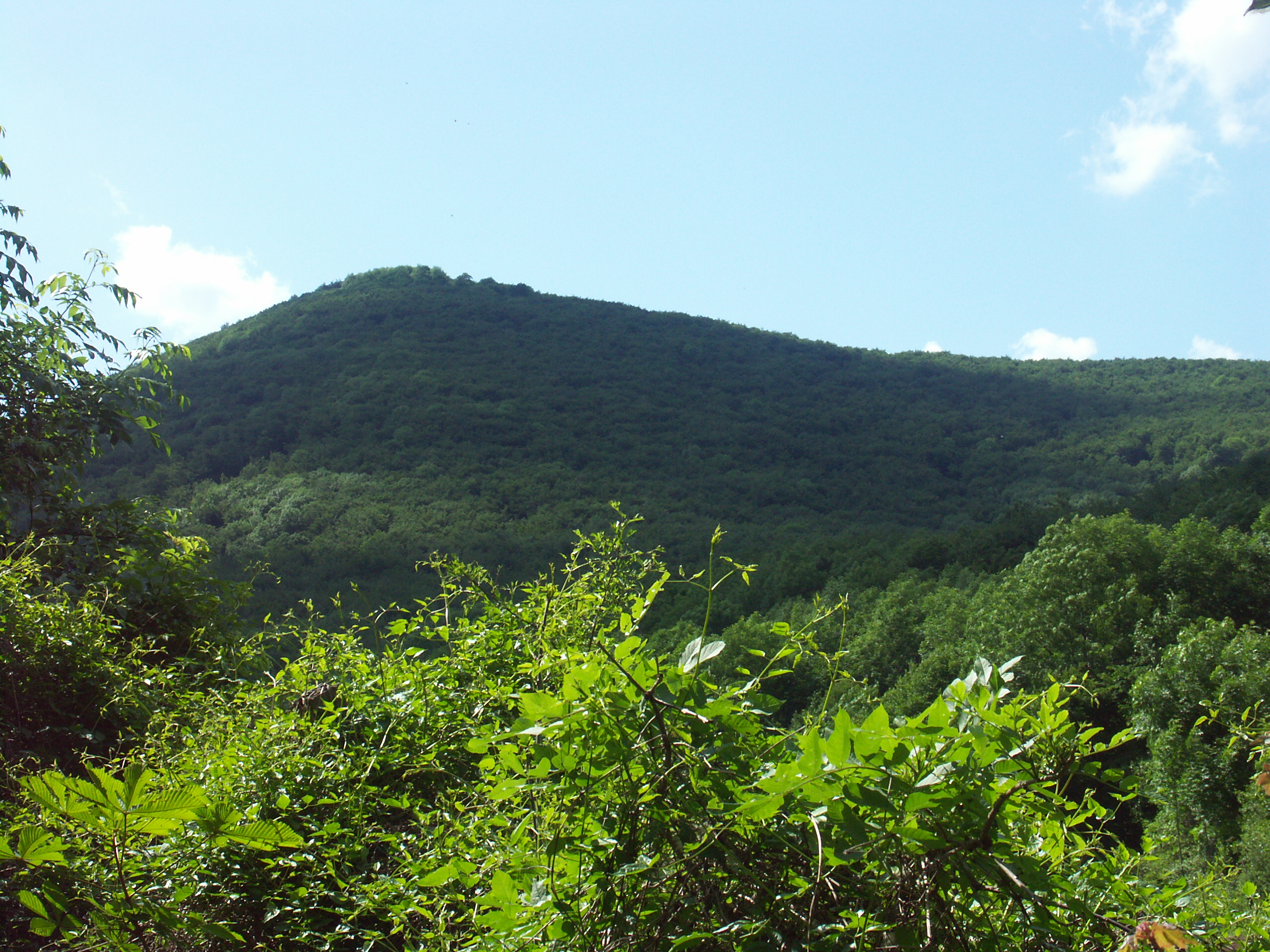
Záruby from Vlčiareň
