= Mezholezy (former Horšovský Týn District) =

- Municipality
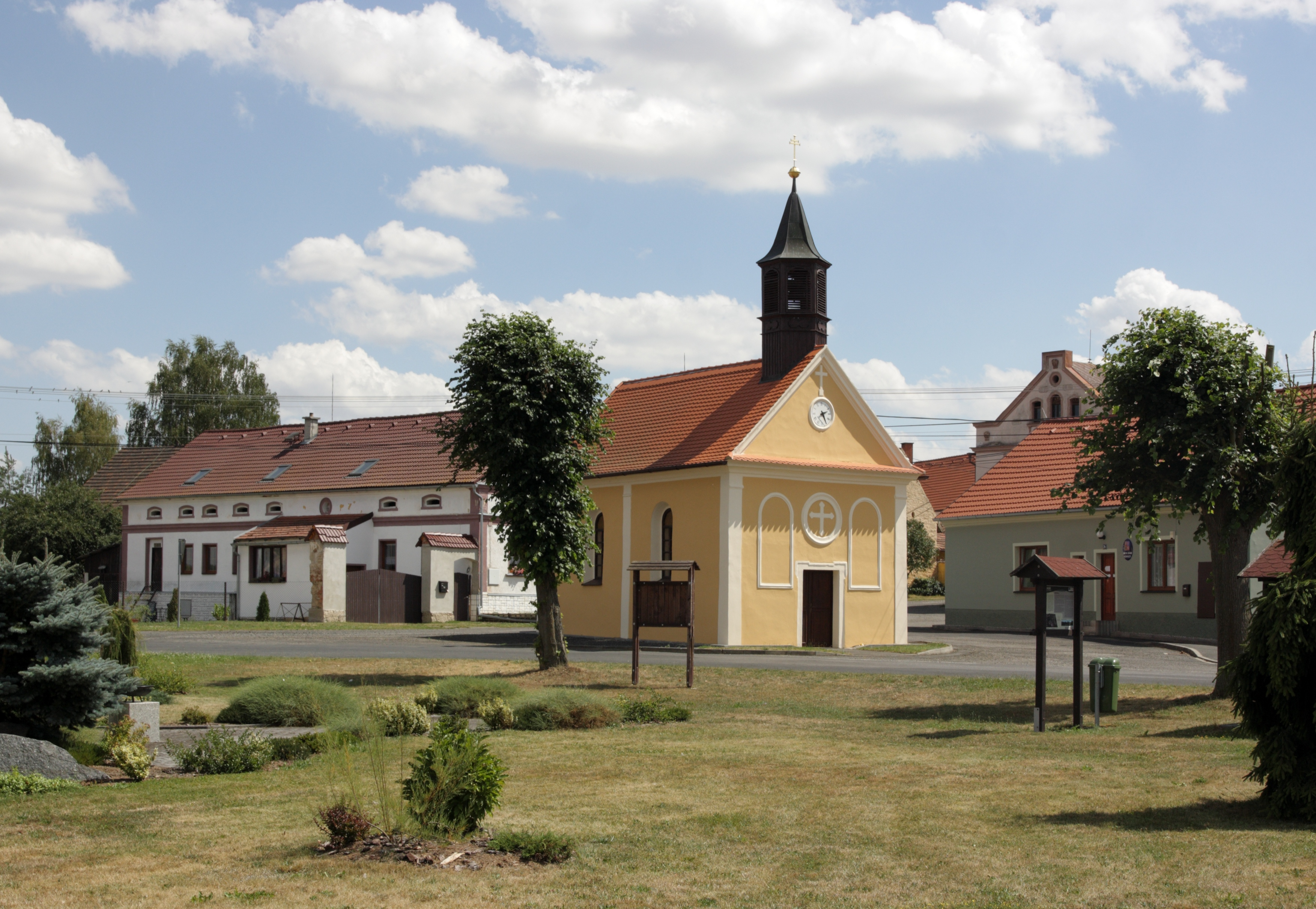
- Centre of Mezholezy with the Chapel of the Exaltation of the Holy Cross

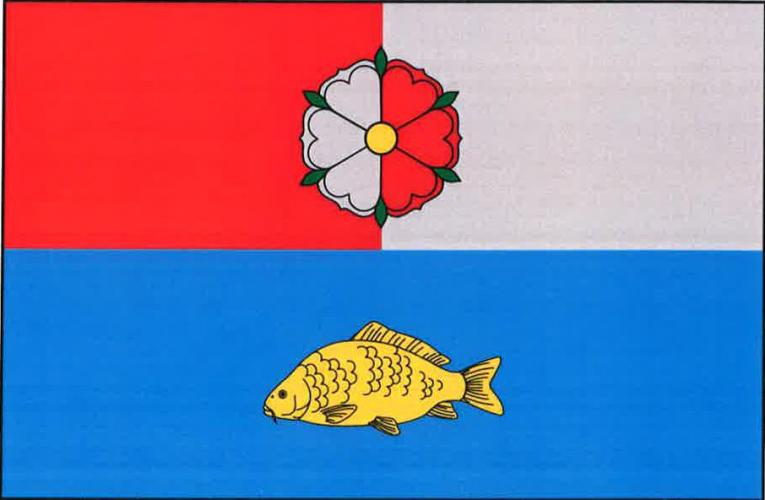
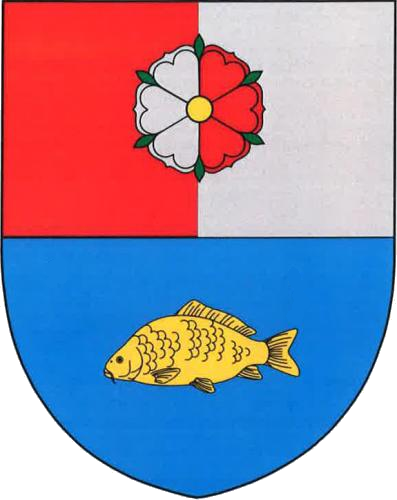
- Flag Coat of arms

- Location in the Czech Republic
- Coordinates: 49°37′29″N 12°54′18″E
- Country: Czech Republic
- Region: Plzeň
- District: Domažlice
- First mentioned: 1386

Area
  - Total: 10.13 km^{2} (3.91 sq mi)
- Elevation: 437 m (1,434 ft)

Population (2026-01-01)
  - Total: 121
  - Density: 11.9/km^{2} (30.9/sq mi)
- Time zone: UTC+1 (CET)
  - Summer (DST): UTC+2 (CEST)
- Postal code: 346 01
- Website: www.obecmezholezy.cz

Mezholezy is a municipality and village in Domažlice District in the Plzeň Region of the Czech Republic. It has about 100 inhabitants.

Mezholezy lies approximately 21 kilometres (13 mi) north of Domažlice, 37 km (23 mi) west of Plzeň, and 121 km (75 mi) south-west of Prague.

== Administrative division ==
Mezholezy consists of two municipal parts (in brackets population according to the 2021 census):

- Mezholezy (92)
- Buková (25)

== Demographics ==
Historical population
Year	Pop.	±%
1869	359	—
1880	318	−11.4%
1890	311	−2.2%
1900	304	−2.3%
1910	310	+2.0%
1921	307	−1.0%
1930	285	−7.2%
1950	159	−44.2%
1961	173	+8.8%
1970	148	−14.5%
1980	151	+2.0%
1991	157	+4.0%
2001	161	+2.5%
2011	149	−7.5%
2021	117	−21.5%
Source: Censuses
