= Little Carpathians =

Mountain range in Slovakia and Austria

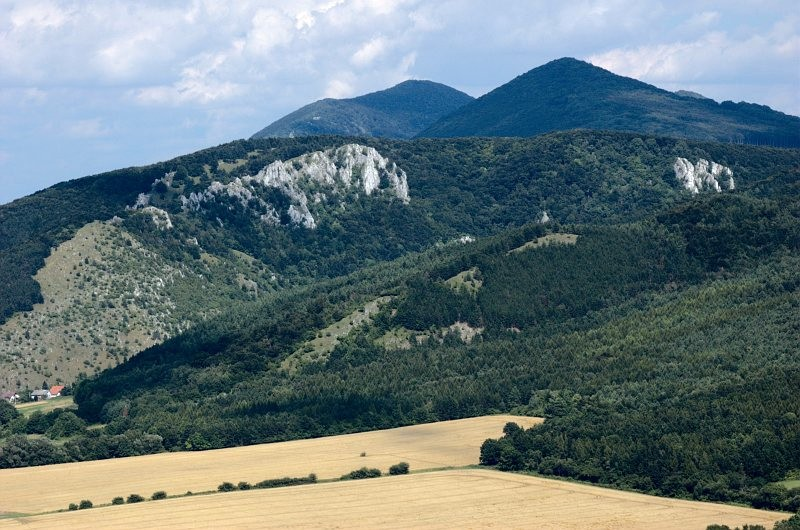
- Little Carpathians near Plavecké Podhradie

Highest point
- Peak: Záruby
- Elevation: 768 m (2,520 ft)
- Coordinates: 48°31′25″N 17°23′33″E

Geography
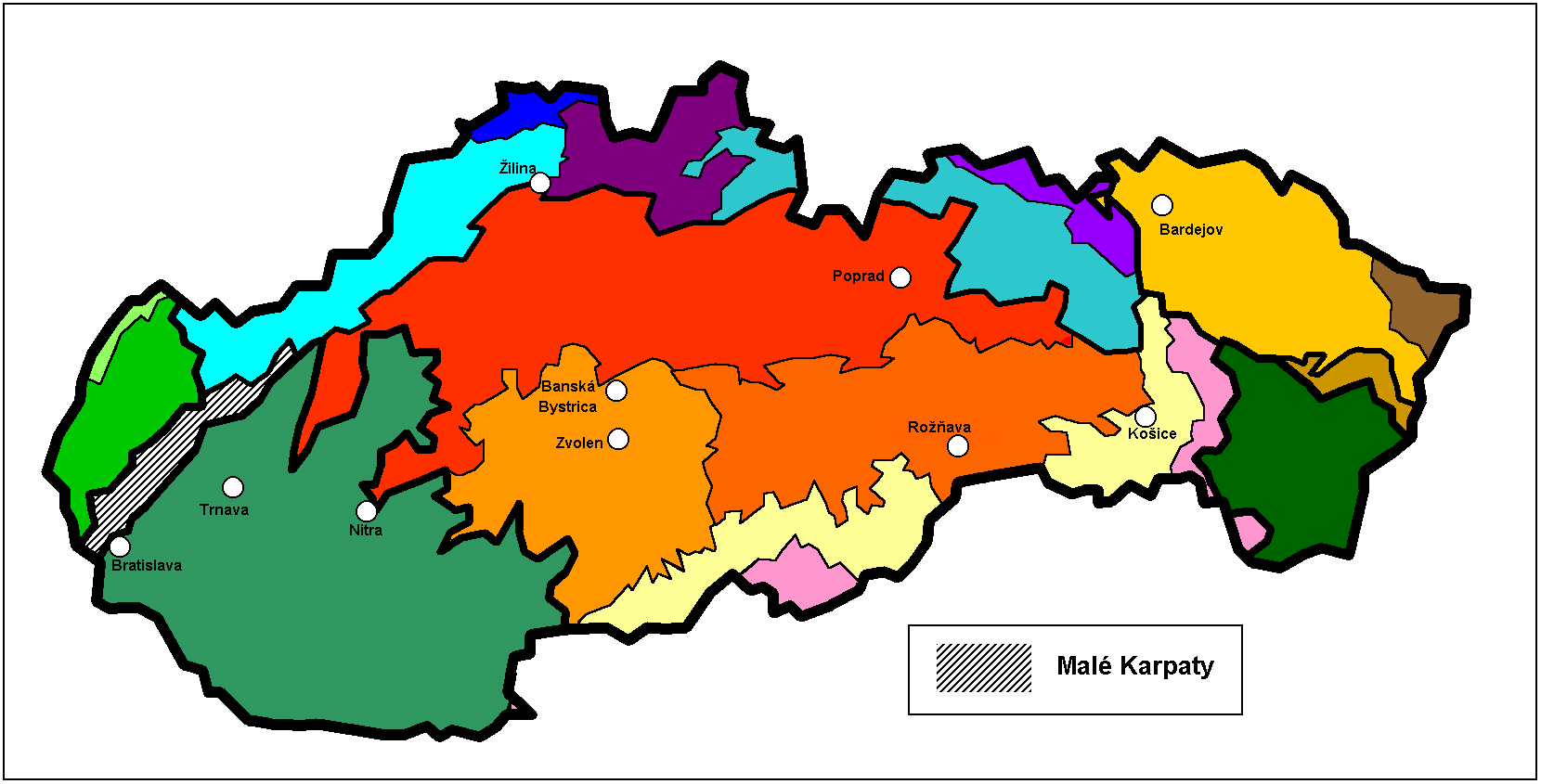
- Little Carpathians (shown in grey cross-hatching) within the geomorphological division of Slovakia
- Countries: Slovakia and Austria
- Range coordinates: 48°25′N 17°15′E
- Parent range: Western Carpathians

The Little Carpathians (also: Lesser Carpathians, Slovak: Malé Karpaty; German: Kleine Karpaten; Hungarian: Kis-Kárpátok) are a low mountain range, about 100 km long, and part of the Carpathian Mountains. The mountains are situated in Western Slovakia, covering the area from Bratislava to Nové Mesto nad Váhom, and northeastern Austria, where a very small part called Hundsheimer Berge (or Hainburger Berge) is located south of the Devín Gate. The Little Carpathians are bordered by the Záhorie Lowland in the west and the Danubian Lowland in the east.

In 1976, the Little Carpathians were declared a protected area under the name Little Carpathians Protected Landscape Area, covering 646.1 km^{2} (249.5 sq mi). The area is rich in floral and faunal diversity and contains numerous castles, most notably the Bratislava Castle, and natural caves. Driny is the only cave open to the public. The three highest mountains are Záruby at 768 m (2,520 ft), Vysoká at 754 m (2,474 ft), and Vápenná at 752 m (2,467 ft).

== Description ==
Geomorphologically, the Little Carpathians belong to the Alps-Himalaya System, the Carpathian Mountains sub-system, the Western Carpathians province, and the Inner Western Carpathians sub-province.

The Little Carpathians are further divided into four parts, from south to north: the Devín Carpathians (Slovak: Devínske Karpaty), the Pezinok Carpathians (Slovak: Pezinské Karpaty), the Brezová Carpathians (Slovak: Brezovské Karpaty) and the Čachtice Carpathians (Slovak: Čachtické Karpaty).

Geomorphological division of the Little Carpathians
Mountain range	Division	Subdivision
Little Carpathians	Devín Carpathians (Slovak: Devínske Karpaty) – in Bratislava	Devínska Kobyla (Slovak: Devínska Kobyla)
Little Carpathians	Devín Carpathians (Slovak: Devínske Karpaty) – in Bratislava	Bratislava Foothills (Slovak: Bratislavské predhorie)
Little Carpathians	Devín Carpathians (Slovak: Devínske Karpaty) – in Bratislava	Lamač Gate (Slovak: Lamačská brána)
Little Carpathians	Devín Carpathians (Slovak: Devínske Karpaty) – in Bratislava	Devín Gate (Slovak: Devínska brána)
Little Carpathians	Pezinok Carpathians (Slovak: Pezinské Karpaty) – from Bratislava to Buková	Homoľa Carpathians (Slovak: Homoľské Karpaty)
Little Carpathians	Pezinok Carpathians (Slovak: Pezinské Karpaty) – from Bratislava to Buková	Kuchynská hornatina
Little Carpathians	Pezinok Carpathians (Slovak: Pezinské Karpaty) – from Bratislava to Buková	Stupava Foothills (Slovak: Stupavské predhorie)
Little Carpathians	Pezinok Carpathians (Slovak: Pezinské Karpaty) – from Bratislava to Buková	Biele hory
Little Carpathians	Pezinok Carpathians (Slovak: Pezinské Karpaty) – from Bratislava to Buková	Smolenická vrchovina
Little Carpathians	Pezinok Carpathians (Slovak: Pezinské Karpaty) – from Bratislava to Buková	Lošonská kotlina
Little Carpathians	Pezinok Carpathians (Slovak: Pezinské Karpaty) – from Bratislava to Buková	Plavecké predhorie
Little Carpathians	Pezinok Carpathians (Slovak: Pezinské Karpaty) – from Bratislava to Buková	Bukovská brázda
Little Carpathians	Brezová Carpathians (Slovak: Brezovské Karpaty) – from Buková to Prašník	Dobrovodská kotlina
Little Carpathians	Čachtice Carpathians (Slovak: Čachtické Karpaty) – from Prašník to Nové Mesto nad Váhom	Plešivec
Little Carpathians	Čachtice Carpathians (Slovak: Čachtické Karpaty) – from Prašník to Nové Mesto nad Váhom	Nedze

The mountains are densely forested (90% being broad-leaved trees), and the southeastern part contains extensive vineyards (e.g. Rača, Pezinok, and Modra). Several castles or castle ruins are situated in the Little Carpathians, for example Devín, Čachtice, Červený Kameň, and Smolenice castles.

Geologically, the mountain range is part of the Tatra-Fatra Belt of core mountains. There are several active faults which have produced earthquakes. Of them the most notable is the Dobra Voda fault (1906 and 1930 produced 8.5° and 7.5° EMS-98 or equal to $M_\mathrm{L}$ = 5.7 and 5.0). This particular fault is closely monitored because of its proximity to the Bohunice Nuclear Power Plant, approximately 15 km away. The Little Carpathians are seismically one of the most active regions in Slovakia and the epicentres of many earthquakes with an approximate magnitude of 2.5 on the Richter magnitude scale are located here.

There are a total of eight karst areas in the Little Carpathians: the Devín Carpathians, Borinka (Pajštún), Cajlan, Kuchyňa-orešany, Plavecký, Smolenice, Dobrovodský, and Čachtice karsts. The most important karst forms include the caves Deravá, Tmavá skala, Driny, and Čachtická, and additional caves along the Borinský potok. Driny, a limestone cave, is the only cave open to the public. Major streams include Vydrica and Suchý jarok.

== Highest peaks ==
Image	Slovak name	Height	Location & Notes
	Záruby	767.4 meters AMSL	Above the village Smolenice
	Vysoká	754.3 meters AMSL	Outside of the main ridge of the Little Carpathians, above the village Kuchyňa, summit offers extensive views
	Vápenná (Roštún)	752.2 meters AMSL	Features a 4-meter tall concrete observation obelisk built in 2003
	Čertov kopec (vrch)	751.8 meters AMSL	Forested summit with no marked trails leading here
	Veterlín	723.5 meters AMSL	
	Havranica	717.1 meters AMSL	
	Čelo	716.0 meters AMSL	Forested summit with no marked trails leading here
	Veľká homoľa	709.2 meters AMSL	Since 2001, it has featured a 20-meter-tall observation tower on the summit
	Čmeľok	709.0 meters AMSL	Features a military radar on the summit
	Skalnatá	704.2 meters AMSL	Offers extensive views

== History ==
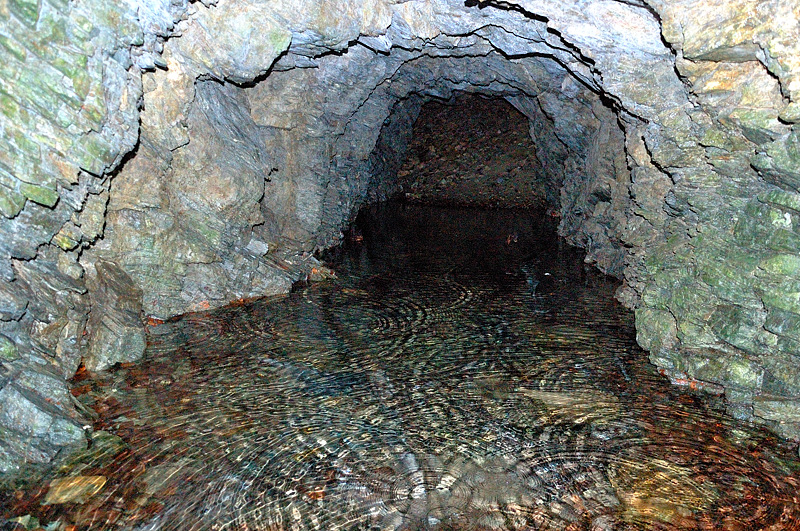
Abandoned pyrite mine near Pernek

While being a relatively low mountain range, the Little Carpathians have long been considered a formidable mountain barrier, often attaining a height of 500 meters, as they are surrounded by various lowlands. In the past, various types of ore were mined in the Little Carpathians, including ores containing gold, silver, antimony, manganese, and pyrite.

During the Second World War, the Little Carpathians were the birthplace of the partisan group Janko Kráľ. Insurgency in the mountains lasted until their occupation by the Soviet Red Army in 1945.

== Tourism ==
The Little Carpathians are a popular tourist destination in Western Slovakia. The mountains are used for hiking, cycling, tramping, backpacking, automobile and motorcycle tourism, alpine skiing, cross-country skiing, and other winter sports. The mountain range contains a dense network of trails, and the recreational infrastructure is relatively well developed, especially in the south. The Little Carpathians are a popular destination for the inhabitants of Bratislava and other larger cities in the region.

Since the Middle Ages, the area has been known for its wines and wine-making traditions. Well known centers of local wine-making include Svätý Jur, Modra, and Pezinok. The main tourist centers include the Slovak capital Bratislava, Pezinská Baba (halfway between Pezinok and Pernek), and Zochova chata (near Modra).

== Images ==
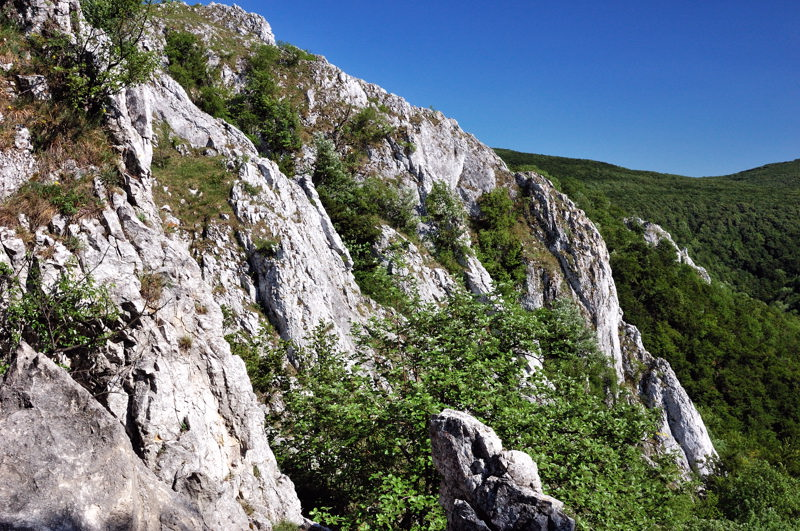
Kršlenica rocks

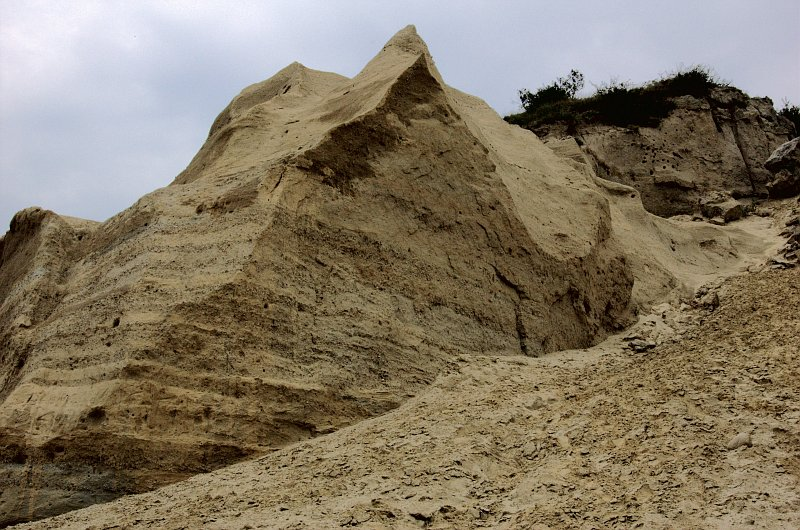
Sandstone rock Sandberg

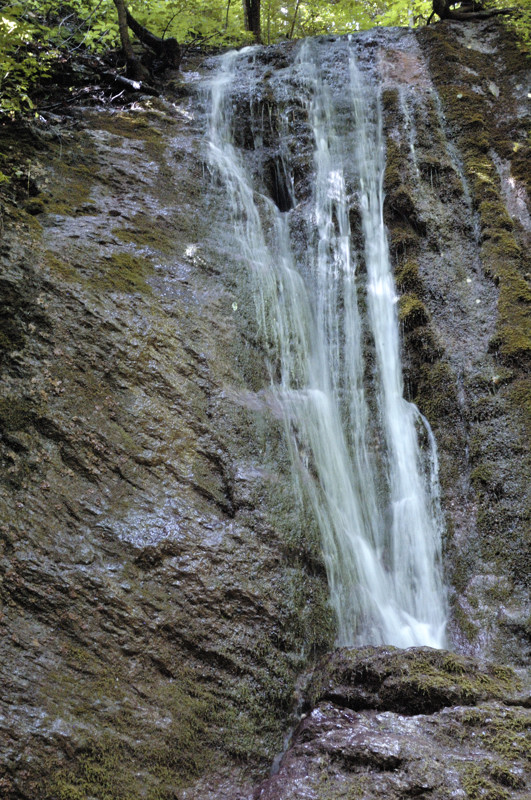
Hlboča waterfall

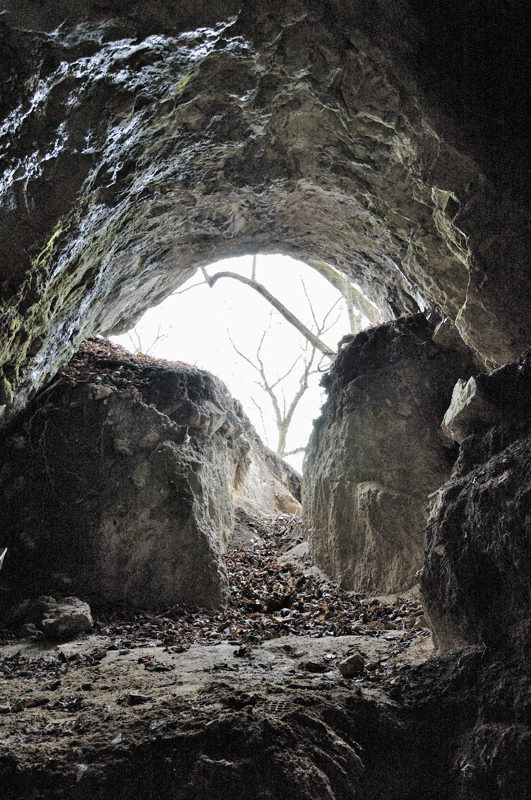
Cave Piesková

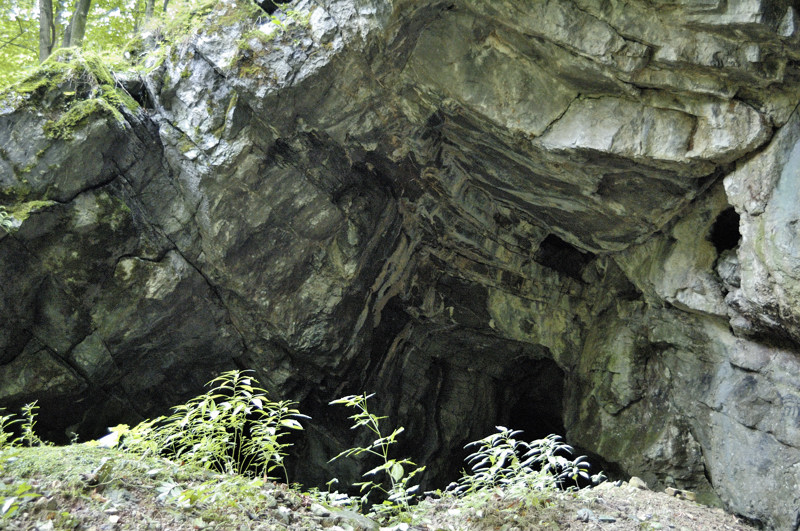
Cave Kabele

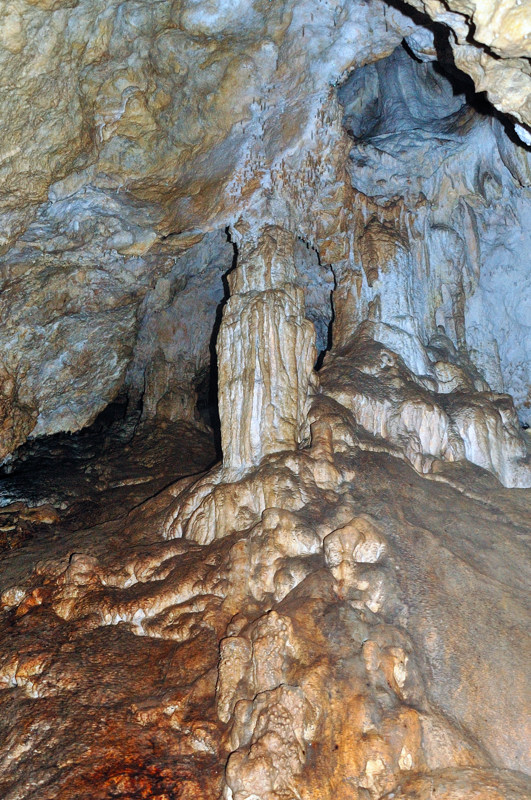
Speleothems in the cave PP1

== See also ==
- Geomorphological division of Slovakia
- Tourism in Slovakia
