= Devínska Nová Ves =

Borough of Bratislava, Slovakia

- Borough
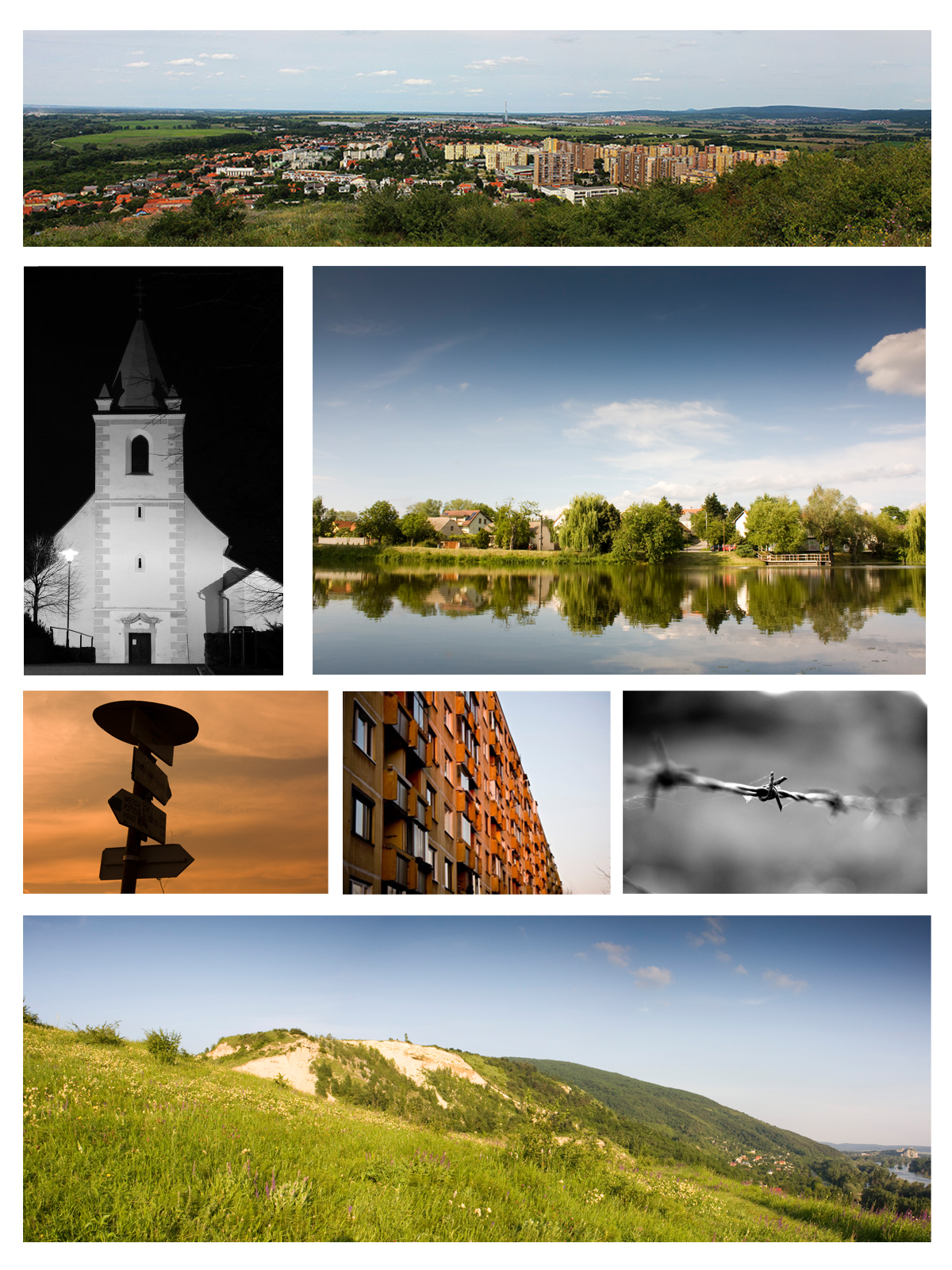

- Flag Coat of arms

- Area of Devínska Nová Ves in Bratislava

- Location of Devínska Nová Ves in Slovakia
- Coordinates: 48°08′00″N 17°07′00″E
- Country: Slovakia
- Region: Bratislava Region
- District: Bratislava IV
- First mentioned: 1451

Government
  - Mayor: Dárius Krajčír

Area
  - Total: 24.22 km^{2} (9.35 sq mi)
- Elevation: 159 m (522 ft)

Population (2025)
  - Total: 17,128
- Time zone: UTC+1 (CET)
  - Summer (DST): UTC+2 (CEST)
- Postal code: 841 07, 841 08
- Area code: +421-2
- Vehicle registration plate: BA, BL, BT
- Website: www.devinskanovaves.sk

Devínska Nová Ves (Hungarian: Dévényújfalu, Croatian: Devinsko Novo Selo, German: Theben-Neudorf) is a borough of Bratislava, the capital of Slovakia. Its western borders are formed by the Morava River, which also forms the national border between Slovakia and Austria.

Devínska Nová Ves is notable mainly for its large Volkswagen factory, for Sandberg, a world-known palaeontological site, where many fossils of prehistoric animals are found, and for the a cyclist bridge over Morava river linking it with Schloss Hof in Austria. Devínska Nová Ves is the last train station in Slovakia on the railway line from Bratislava to Vienna.

Among other things, it is home to the largest Croatian community in Slovakia. Croatian is still spoken here, as well as in Čuňovo and Jarovce, villages on the southern bank of the Danube. The wider presence of Croatian settlers is represented by local place names such as Chorvátsky Grob.

== Geography ==
Devínska Nová Ves borders Devín to the south, the river Morava and Austria to the west, Záhorská Bystrica to the far north-east and Lamač and Dúbravka to the south-east.

The municipality lies at an altitude of 159 metres (522 ft) and covers an area of 24.22 km^{2} (9.35 sq mi) (2025).

=== Division ===
Devínska Nová Ves is divided into 6 local parts: Devínske Jazero, Kostolné, Podhorské, Paulinské, Sídlisko Stred and Vápenka. Unofficially it is also locally divided into four further parts: "Stara Dedina", Kolónia, Grba and Slovinec.

== History ==
Devínska Nová Ves was mentioned for the first time around 1451 as Nová Ves. During the 17th century, the village was growing and after an influx of Croats, the village acquired the name Chorvátska Nová Ves. In the 18th century, a sand mine was built here near Sandberg and later in the 19th century, stone was quarried here as well. In 1848, the village was renamed once more to its current name. In 1918, the village was a site of battle between the Czechoslovak and Hungarian armies as part of fights for Bratislava, and Czechoslovak troops emerged victorious. In 1948, Devínska Nová Ves was near the border of two different political systems, and in 1955 the Iron Curtain was constructed across the territory the village. It was also one of the escape routes to Austria, by swimming across the Morava river. On 1 January 1972, Devínska Nová Ves was made an official borough of Bratislava. In the 1970s and 1980s, new auto plants were built, first Bratislavské automobilové závody (BAZ, later a factory of Volkswagen), which spurred the construction of new apartment blocks in the borough in the late 1980s. In the early 1990s, the Iron Curtain was dismantled.

In part Kostolné there is the Holy Spirit's Church, which is on the list of cultural monuments of Slovakia. This church is situated on small hill over square and archaeological excavations certify its existence as sepulchral place since prehistory. Literature says it was built in renaissance style about year 1580. It is built from stone with a tile roof.

== Transport ==
Devínska Nová Ves lies near the railways to Austria and the Czech Republic. Road traffic is some of the worst in Bratislava, because all of the access roads are busy and narrow. Relocation of these roads is planned to begin soon. In the future, there will be a motorway border crossing to Austria.

Public transportation uses buses and is stressed as well, because the centre is quite distant, and buses are often late. More popular are therefore trains running to Main station twice an hour. In future, railway stop "Devínska Nová Ves - Sídlisko" is planned above Eisnerova street.

A cycle bridge has been constructed across the nearby Morava River, linking Devínska Nová Ves to Schlosshoff castle and Marchegg, in Austria.

== Population ==
Population statistic (10 years)
Year	1995	2005	2015	2025
Count	16,552	15,629	16,060	17,128
Difference		−5.57%	+2.75%	+6.65%

Population statistic
Year	2024	2025
Count	17,077	17,128
Difference		+0.29%

It has a population of 17,128 people (31 December 2025).

=== Ethnicity ===
Census 2021 (1+%)
Ethnicity	Number	Fraction
Slovak	15,369	89.59%
Not found out	1181	6.88%
Czech	320	1.86%
Hungarian	288	1.67%
Total	17,153	

In year 2021 was 17,153 people by ethnicity 15,369 as Slovak, 1181 as Not found out, 320 as Czech, 288 as Hungarian, 165 as Croatian, 117 as Other, 81 as German, 68 as Bulgarian, 51 as Rusyn, 50 as Russian, 46 as Ukrainian, 28 as Polish, 25 as Romani, 23 as Serbian, 16 as Italian, 15 as Romanian, 15 as Moravian, 12 as Albanian, 11 as French, 9 as Jewish, 8 as Austrian, 6 as Vietnamese, 5 as Irish, 4 as Greek, 3 as English, 2 as Chinese, 2 as Silesian, 2 as Canadian, 1 as Turkish and 1 as Iranian.

Note on population: The difference values of population numbers in the table "Population statistic" and in the sections "Ethnicity" & "Religion" is caused by the use of various statistical methods.

=== Religion ===
Census 2021 (1+%)
Religion	Number	Fraction
None	7396	43.12%
Roman Catholic Church	6899	40.22%
Not found out	1395	8.13%
Evangelical Church	542	3.16%
Greek Catholic Church	189	1.1%
Total	17,153	

In year 2021 was 17,153 people by religion 7396 from None, 6899 from Roman Catholic Church, 1395 from Not found out, 542 from Evangelical Church, 189 from Greek Catholic Church, 103 from Ad hoc movements, 101 from Other, 96 from Eastern Orthodox Church, 75 from Christian Congregations in Slovakia, 70 from Jehovah's Witnesses, 45 from Other and not ascertained christian church, 36 from Buddhism, 35 from Calvinist Church, 28 from Apostolic Church, 25 from Baptists Church, 22 from Paganism and natural spirituality, 17 from Seventh-day Adventist Church, 16 from Islam, 16 from Church of the Brethren, 15 from United Methodist Church, 14 from Jewish community, 7 from Church of Jesus Christ of Latter-day Saints, 4 from Old Catholic Church, 3 from Bahá'i Community, 2 from Hinduism and 2 from Czechoslovak Hussite Church.

== People ==
Devínska Nová Ves houses the greatest Croat minority in Slovakia and the Festival of Croatian Culture takes place annually.

Croatian Culture Society (Croatian: Hrvatsko kulturno društvo) organizes annual Croatian Day (Hrvatski dan), with concerts (of klapas, vocal ensembles, tamburitzas), lectures and cultural programme.

== Notable people ==
- Simon Knéfacz, Croatian writer and Hungarian monk
- Rudolf Sloboda, Slovak novelist, playwright, screenwriter, poet and author of children's and young adult literature. The majority of his novels are first-person narratives with tragic themes. He also wrote autobiographical prose.
- Peter Pišťanek, Slovak writer who began publishing short stories in the 1980s

== Gallery ==
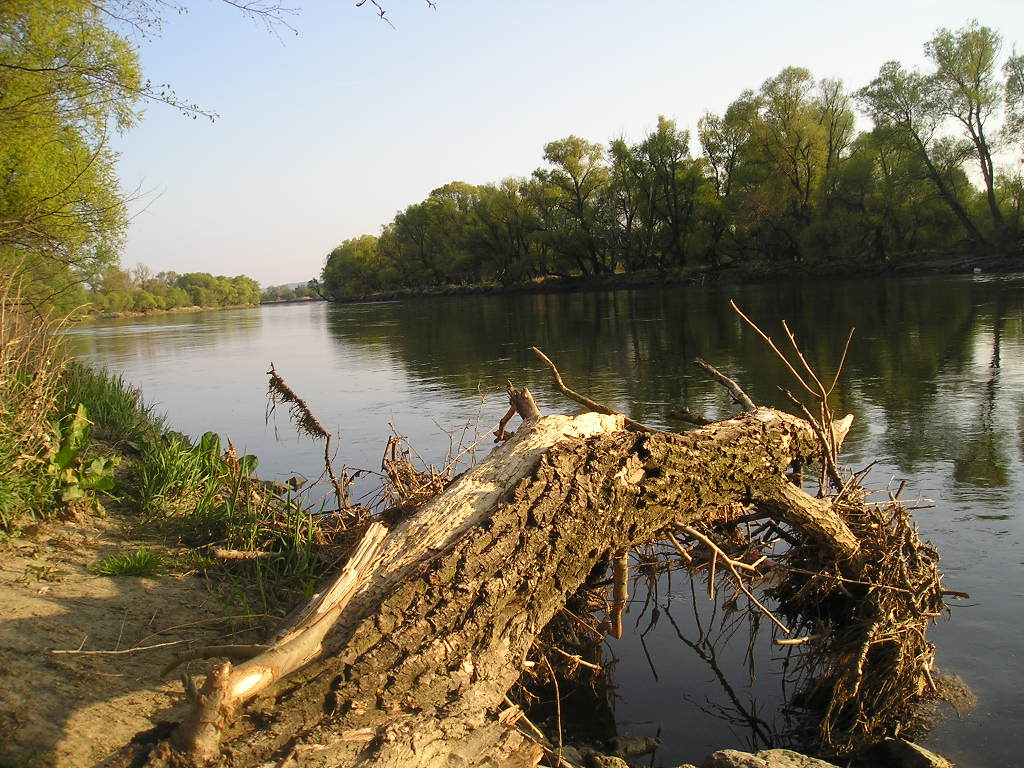
Morava river near Devínska Nová Ves

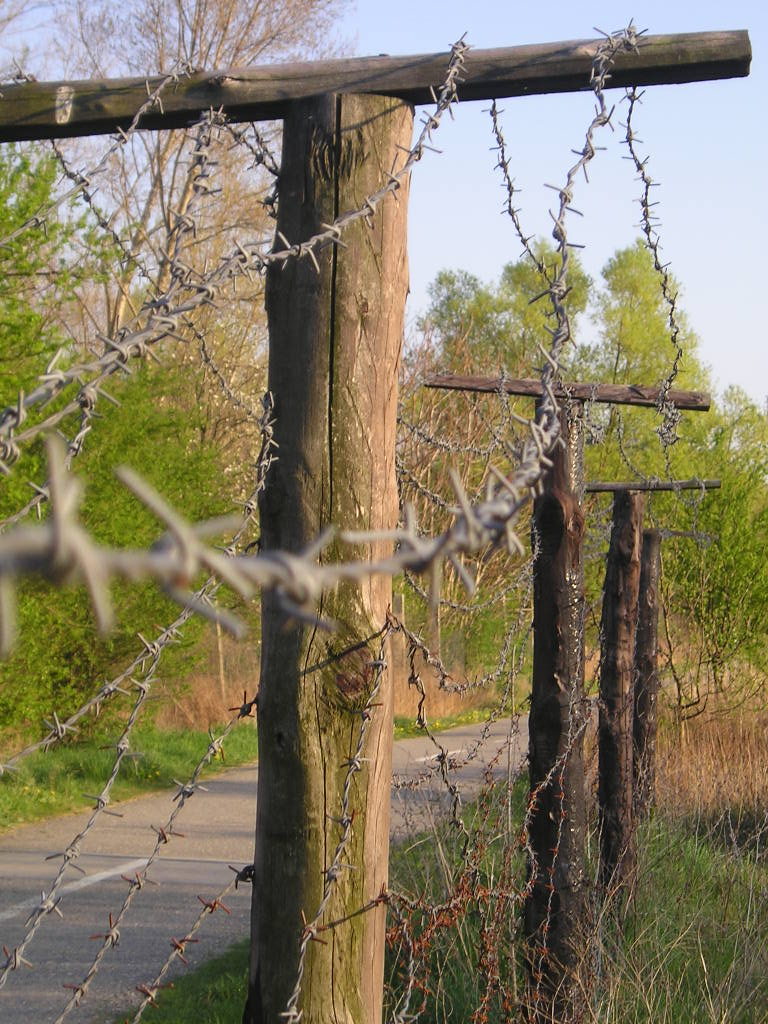
Former Iron Curtain

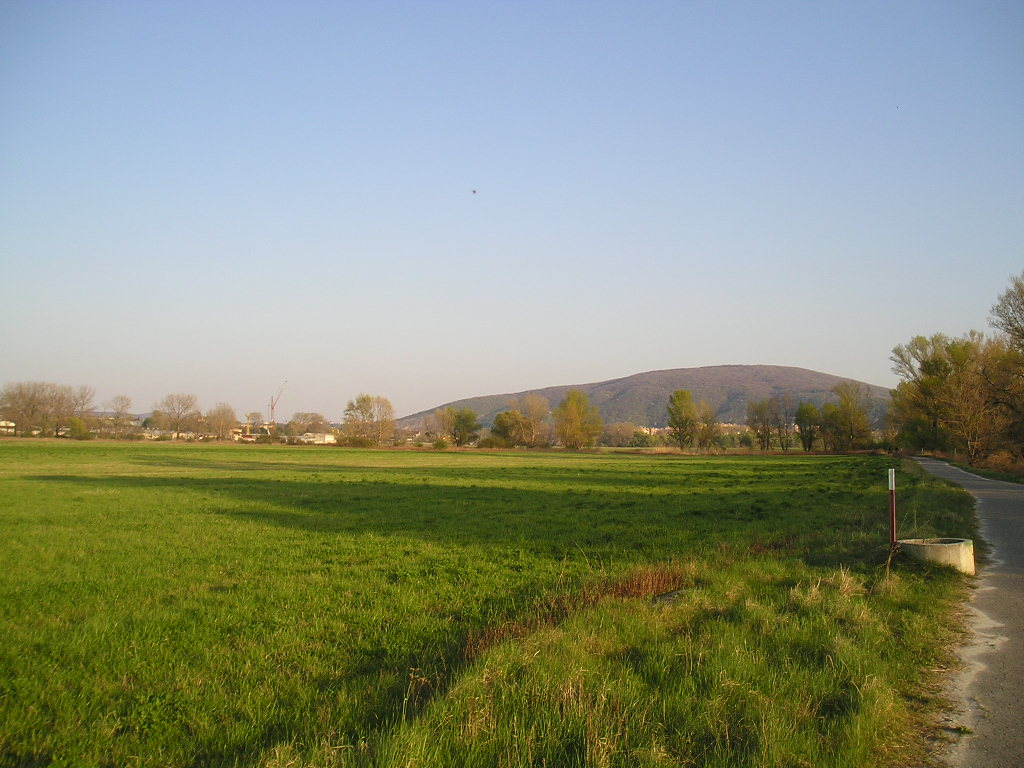
Mt. Devínska Kobyla

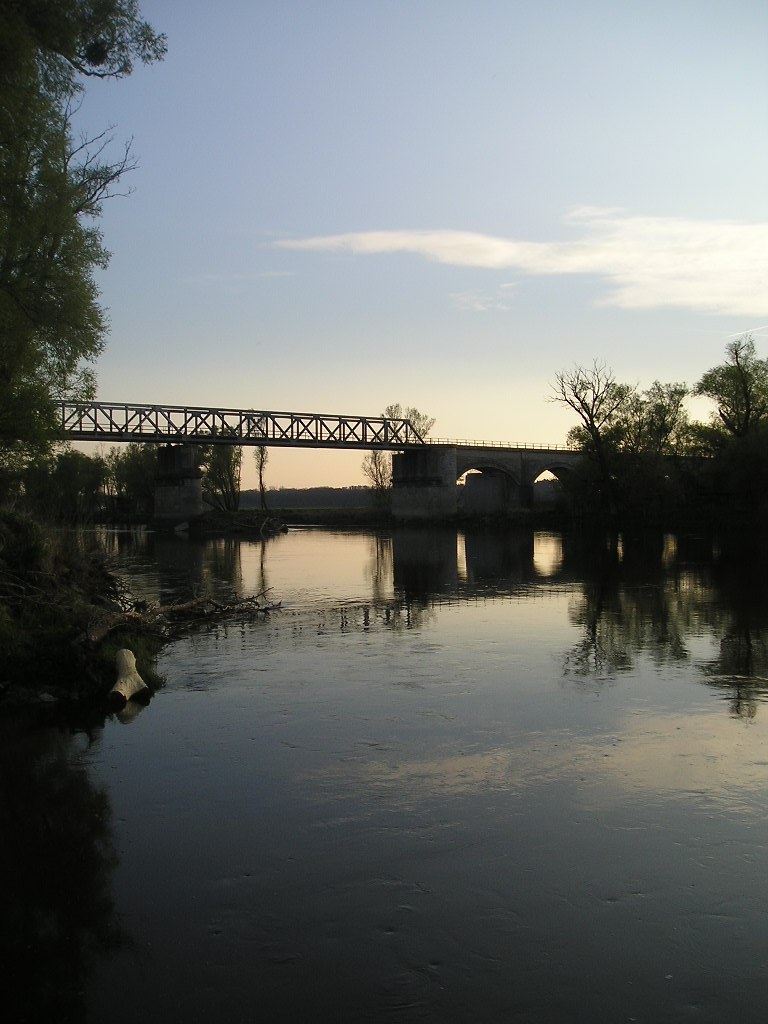
Marchegg bridge
