= Church of the Holy Spirit, Bratislava =

Church building in Bratislava, Slovakia

Coordinates: 48°11′5.6″N 17°2′13.34″E

Church of the Holy Spirit
- Kostol Ducha Svätého
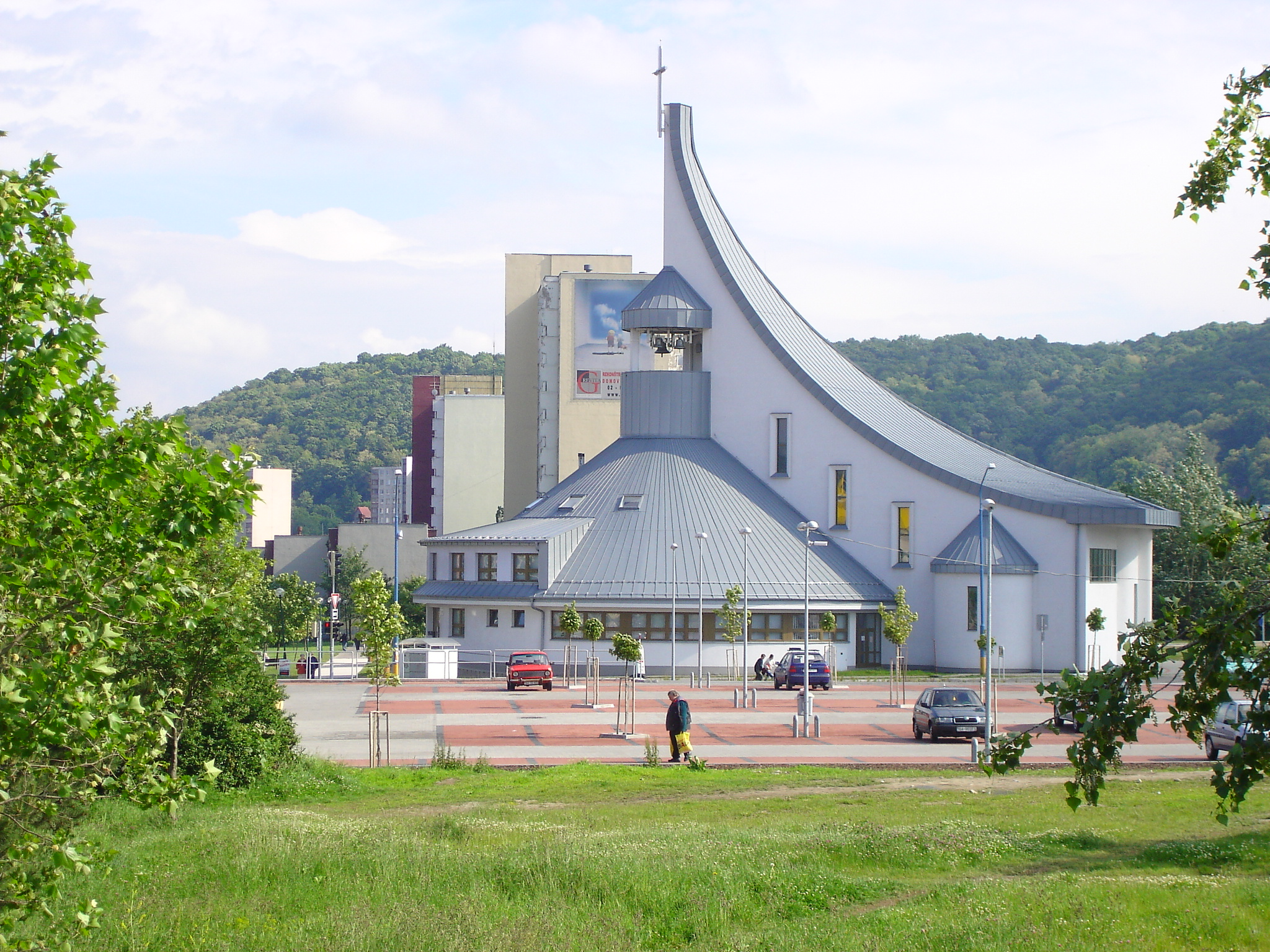

Religion
- Affiliation: Catholic Church
- Diocese: Bratislava 4
- Region: Bratislava
- Rite: Roman
- Patron: Holy Spirit
- Year consecrated: October 26, 2002; 23 years ago

Location
- Location: Dúbravka
- Municipality: Bratislava
- Country: Slovakia
- Interactive map of Church of the Holy Spirit

Specifications
- Capacity: 600 people
- Height (max): 30 metres (98 ft)

Church of the Holy Spirit is a church in Bratislava, Slovakia.

The cornerstone was sanctified by Pope John Paul II. It is an atypical Building with an unusual roof, 30m high. It has a circular shape and consists of church and pastoral sections. The church was designed by architects Ľudovít Režucha and Marián Lupták. Instead of an altar picture on the wall, there is a metal sculpture of the Holy Spirit depicted as a dove, by Monsignor Ladislav Jurovatý. The church section has capacity of roughly 600 visitors.
