= Alexander Ilečko =

Slovak sculptor (1937–2023)

- Born: 25 February 1937; Bratislava, Czechoslovakia
- Died: 21 October 2023 (aged 86)
- Known for: Sculpture

Alexander Ilečko (25 February 1937 – 21 October 2023) was a Slovak sculptor.

== Biography ==
Alexander Ilečko was born on 25 February 1937 in Bratislava. He was educated at the grammar school in Revúca and studied monumental painting at the Academy of Fine Arts and Design in Bratislava, graduating in 1961. During the Prague Spring, he pursued further education at the Academy of Fine Arts Vienna.

Ilečko split his time between his two homes in Revúca and Modra. He also had an atelier in the town of Pezinok, close to Modra.

Ilečko's sculptures are very diverse, reflecting the artist's refusal to associate himself with any particular artistic movement. The dominant material used by Ilečko is wood, in particular locally sourced from Modra, but he also heavily utilized bronze and occasionally stone and clay. His sculptures describe often abstractly deformed human forms, but he also created busts of important personalities of Slovak history including Ľudovít Štúr and Rudolf Sloboda.

Ilečko died on 21 October 2023, at the age of 86.
