= Evangelical Church, Dúbravka =

Church in Bratislava, Slovakia

Coordinates: 48°10′42″N 17°02′45″E

Evangelical church in Bratislava-Dúbravka
- Evanjelický zborový dom v Bratislave-Dúbravke
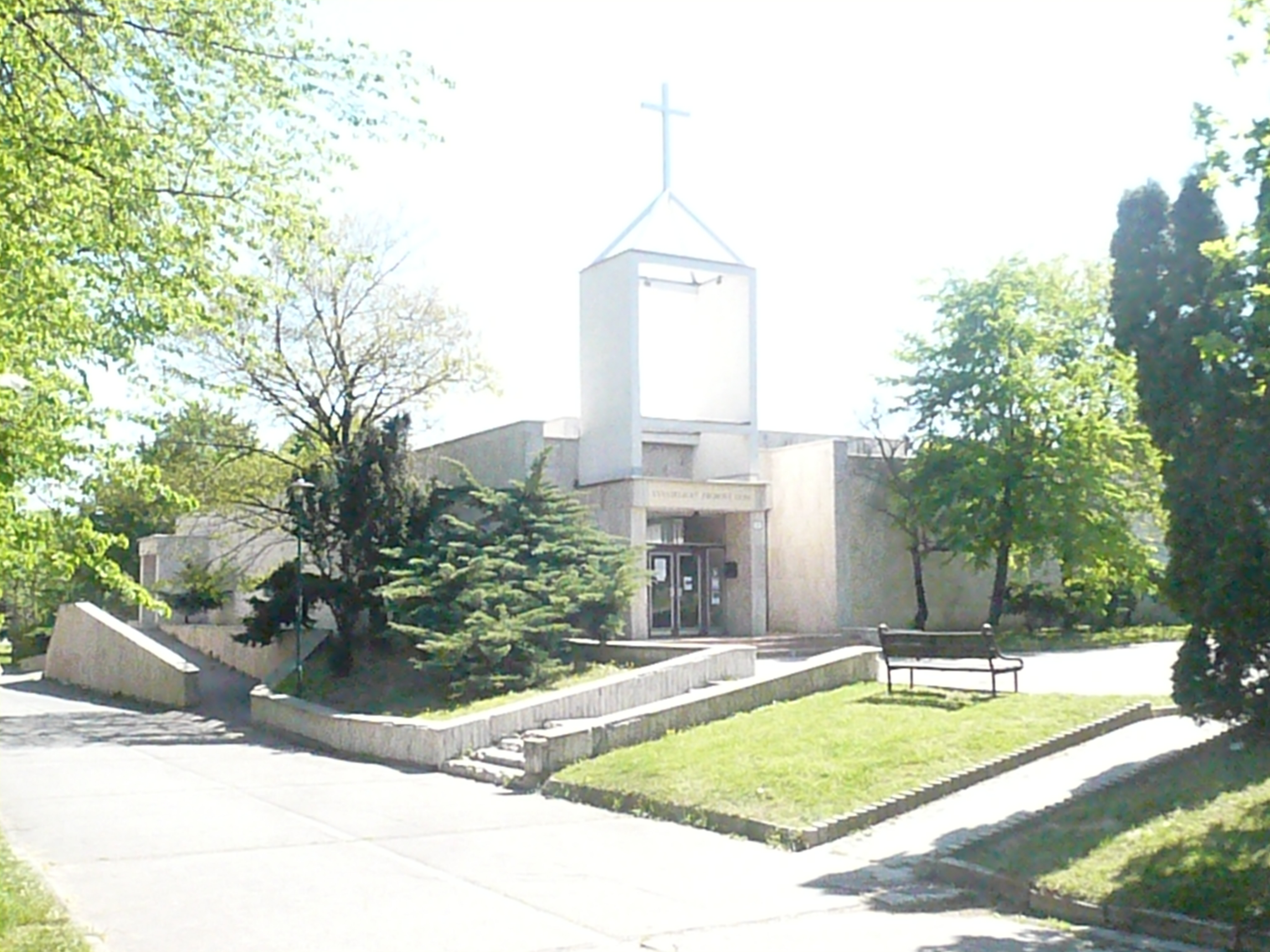
- Church view from the park

Religion
- Affiliation: Lutheran
- Ecclesiastical or organisational status: Church

Location
- Location: Dúbravka, Bratislava, Slovakia
- Interactive map of Evangelical church in Bratislava-Dúbravka

Architecture
- Style: Modern
- Capacity: ca. 300 believers

Website
- https://ecavdubravka.sk/: Address: Evanjelická cirkev, o.z. Mikuláša Schneidera Trnavského No. 1 841 01 Bratislava; Phone No.: +421 2 6446 3354

The Evangelical church in Dúbravka, a suburb of Bratislava, is the second-youngest religious building in this part of Bratislava. Originally built as a ceremonial hall in the 1980s, regular evangelical worship services began in 1995. In 2003, the building became the property of the Slovak Evangelical Church. The church consists of a main hall with a capacity of about 200 people and a minor hall with a 100-person capacity. In 2006, the general bishop consecrated a white marble octangular baptismal font made as a commemoration to the early Christian believers and traditions. The interior is dominated by 4-meter-tall wooden cross with textile depiction of the Creed.

The church is the center of evangelical believers of Bratislava's fourth district.
