= Sandberg (sandstone hill) =

Paleontological site in Slovakia

- Pieskovec (in Slovak)
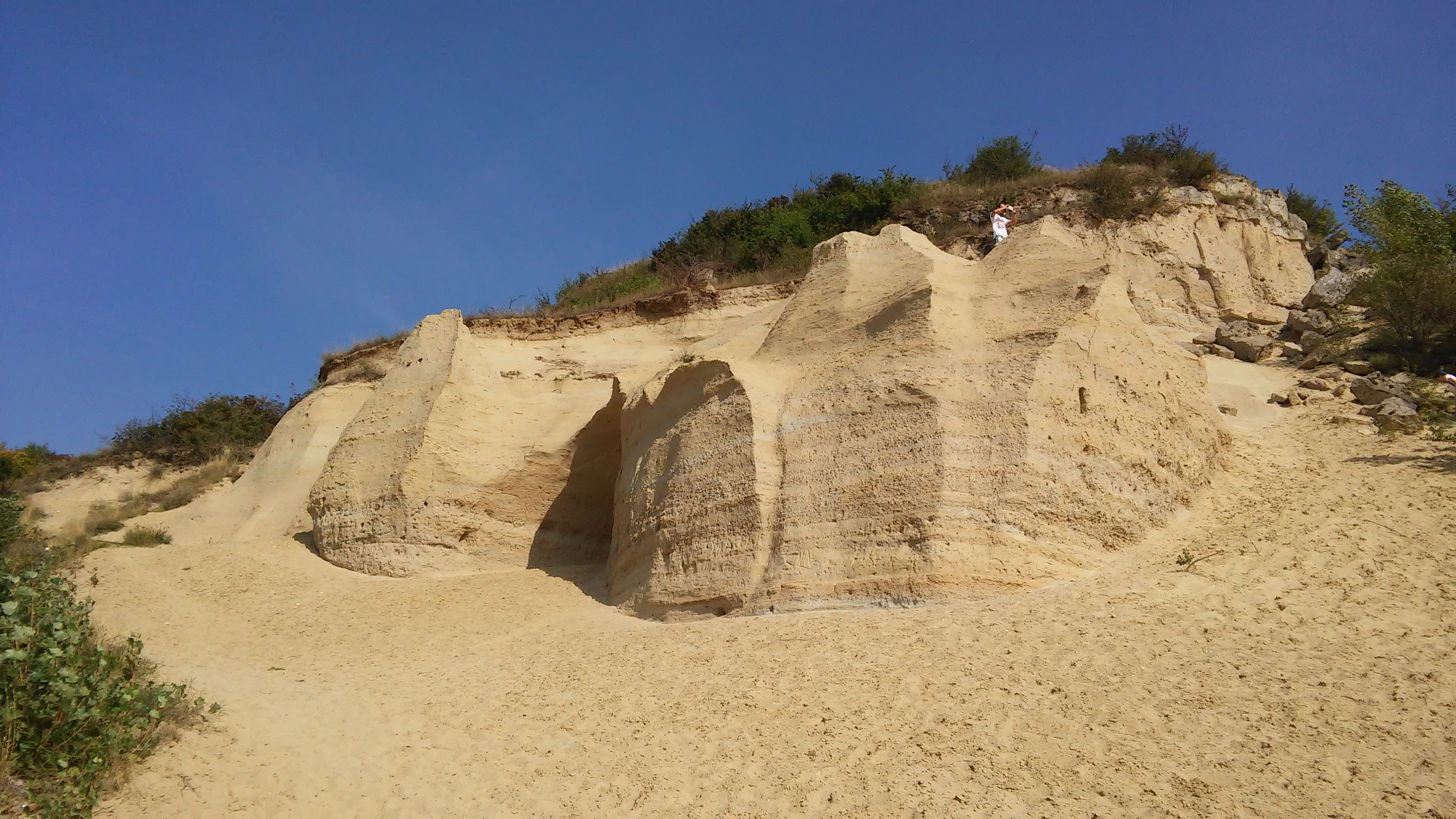

Highest point
- Coordinates: 48.200833°N 16.974722°E

Geography
- Location: Devínska Nová Ves, Bratislava, Slovakia

Sandberg (also known as Pieskovec) is an important paleontological site located in the Devínska Nová Ves urban district of Bratislava, Slovakia. It lies on the southwestern edge of the Little Carpathians Protected Landscape Area and is part of the Devínska Kobyla National Nature Reserve.

== History ==
The site was discovered during sand mining. It was declared a protected site with an area of 25.6 ha in 1964. The following year it was expanded and renamed the Devínska Kobyla State Nature Reserve, with an area of 27.97 ha. In 1986, the protected area of the reserve grew to 102 ha. The last change came on 1 January 1995, when it was renamed the Devínska Kobyla National Nature Reserve, with the highest level of protection. The reasons for the protection are mainly the occurrence of rich thermophilic flora and fauna (especially insects); the occurrence of sand flora and the occurrence of species of the orchid family, to which it belongs to the most important localities in Slovakia. In 2021, volunteers, in cooperation with the State Nature Conservation Agency, marked out a corridor for tourists with posts. Camera surveillance, orientation maps, and information boards were also added.

== Geology ==
Sandberg is the rock remnants of the Tertiary sea, which spread in the Vienna Basin. During a massive sea uplift (transgression) (about 14-16 million years ago), sands with interspersed gravels, sandstones and breccias were deposited horizontally on the limestones from the Jurassic and Lower Cretaceous periods (about 160-180 million years ago). Horizontal benches of more resistant rocks - sandstones and lithotamnian limestones - are visible in the sandstone wall. On the slopes and at the foot of the sandbank, massive blocks (boulders) of sandstone and sandy lithotamnian limestones are intruded, which remained there after the last chamber blasting.

== Paleontology ==
About 300 species of fossils of gastropods, bivalves, sea urchins, sponges, foraminifera, as well as larger marine and terrestrial animals have been found on Sandberg. Numerous teeth of sharks and bony fish, remains of turtles, a whale vertebra (lat. Mesocetus hungaricus), fragments of apes (lat. Pliopithecus antiquus or lat. Sivapithecus darwini), a seal (lat. Pristiphoca vetusta), a woolly rhinoceros, a cave bear and birds have been found there. The occurrence of sea urchins and sharks indicates the normal salinity of the Neogene sea. The presence of red lithothamnium algae, in turn, indicates a depth of up to 60 m.
