= Dúbravka, Bratislava =

Dúbravka
- Borough
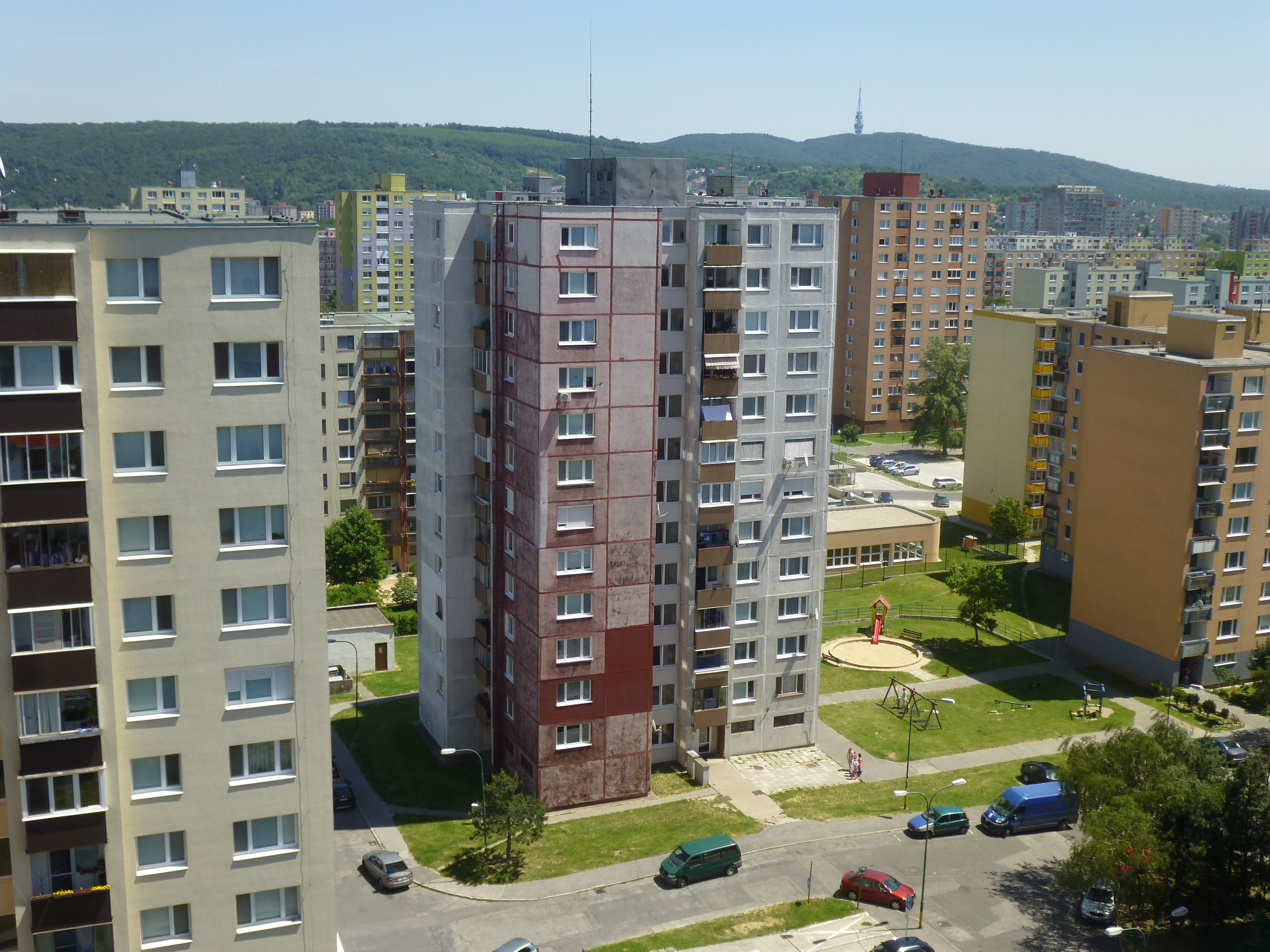

- Coat of arms

- Area of Dúbravka in Bratislava

- Location of Dúbravka in Slovakia
- Coordinates: 48°08′00″N 17°07′00″E
- Country: Slovakia
- Region: Bratislava Region
- District: Bratislava IV
- First mentioned: 1573 (Julian)

Government
  - Mayor: Martin Zaťovič

Area
  - Total: 8.62 km^{2} (3.33 sq mi)
- Elevation: 203 m (666 ft)

Population (2025)
  - Total: 35,300
- Time zone: UTC+1 (CET)
  - Summer (DST): UTC+2 (CEST)
- Postal code: 841 01, 841 02, 841 03
- Area code: +421-2
- Vehicle registration plate (until 2022): BA, BL, BT
- Website: www.dubravka.sk

Dúbravka (Slovak pronunciation: [ˈduːbrawka]) is a city borough of Bratislava, the capital of Slovakia. It is located in the north-western part of the city, lying on the slopes of the Devín Carpathians mountains. It is part of the Bratislava IV administrative district. The city borough covers 862 ha and is home to approximately 36,000 inhabitants. The borough is served by both public transport trams and buses, yet Dúbravka is known for the low level of service provided here.

Dúbravka features a museum, an ancient Germanic settlement with Roman-style buildings (sometimes wrongly labeled "villa rustica"), a covered ice stadium, ŠKP Dúbravka football stadium, numerous schools, two Roman Catholic churches and an Evangelical church. The Dúbravka House of Culture is the cultural center of the borough.

== Geography ==
The municipality lies at an altitude of 203 metres (666 ft) and covers an area of 8.62 km^{2} (3.33 sq mi) (2025).

== Location ==
Dúbravka borders Karlova Ves to the south, Devín to the west, Devínska Nová Ves to the north and Lamač to the north-east.

=== Division ===
Dúbravka is divided into three local parts: Krčace, Záluhy and Podvornice.

- Krčace is the southernmost part of Dúbravka at the border with the Karlova Ves borough. It is a non-residential area consisting mostly of recreational cottages and it features the Iuventa youth complex, swimming pool Rosnička, and the ŠKP football stadium.
- Záluhy start at the crossroads of Mikuláša Schneidera Trnavského Street, Karloveská street and Harmincova Street continuing to the west. The area consists of typical socialist era panel houses.
- Podvornice is an area roughly bordered by Saratovská Street, the D2 motorway, Nejedlého Street from the north and Drobného Street from the south.

== History ==
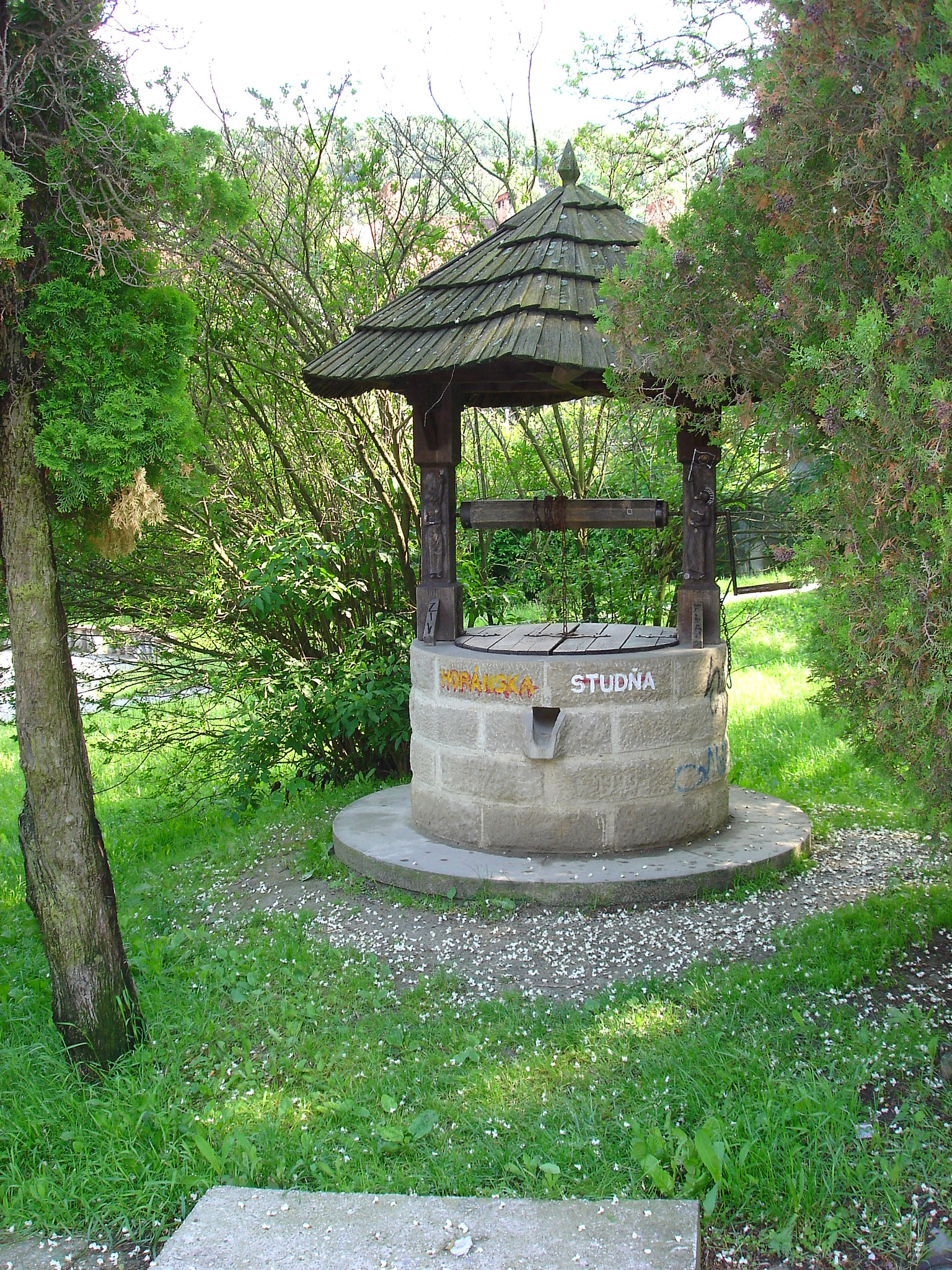
Historical "Horánska studňa" in Old Dúbravka

Dúbravka was a separate village already in existence in the 14th century; at that time it was an administrative part of Devín. Since the 1730s until 1945 it was owned by the Malacky branch of the aristocratic family Pálffy ab Erdöd. It was first mentioned in written documents in 1576 stating that ethnic Croats first settled the nearby village of Lamač in the first half of the 16th century and in the second half they moved into Devín and Dúbravka. It was later mentioned in a 1683 text, while Vienna was last besieged by the Ottoman Empire. The Ottoman expansion and the fact that part of the anti-Ottoman army was stationed in Dúbravka lowered the quality of life in the village.

In the 18th century economic activity in Dúbravka centered around wine-making. The area of worked land rose continuously over the years, and farmers in Dúbravka were compensated for the relatively poor soil quality in the village. In the 19th century the village was sacked during the Napoleonic Wars by the French advancing towards Vienna. In 1831 the village suffered a Plague epidemic, with a second outbreak at the end of the Austro-Prussian War in 1866 when it was again sacked and burned. A fire brigade was established in 1889. Important figure in 19th century Dúbravka was the local priest Moyš. Despite Dúbravka not having any ethnic divisions or problems, he strengthened Slovak nationalism in the village. Under his leadership, theater was established in the village in 1905.

In the years 1911-1912 a master carpenter from Braitslava František Tavarík started the construction of recreational wooden houses at the edge of Dúbravka. Later, he started the construction of villas in an area that came to be known as Tavaríkova kolónia. First World War massively disrupted economic activity in the village. Defensive fortifications were constructed in the hills surrounding the village, although they were never used in combat. After the war, the land owned by the noble Mikuláš Pálffy was confiscated and divided. The village was electrified in 1931, local school was constructed in 1935 and drinking water pipes were laid in 1936. Sewage plumbing was laid in 1938. The village struggled with unemployment during the 1930s.

On 6 October 1938 control of the village was violently taken by the local branch of Slovak People's Party. In 1939 the neighboring Devín was annexed by Nazi Germany and Dúbravka became a frontier village. Economic downturn during the Second World War was partially solved by ferrying workers into Germany. The village was occupied by the Red Army on 5 April 1945. Dúbravka was incorporated into Bratislava in April 1946 as the capital city was beginning to expand.

In the 1970s, large-scale construction of socialist apartment blocks started in Dúbravka, essentially dividing the suburb into a small original part with family houses (Old Dúbravka) and the suburb proper consisting of panel houses (sometimes called New Dúbravka) with approximately 15 000 flats.

List of local cultural monuments of Dúbravka
	Statue of Saint Florian / Socha sv. Floriána	Jadranská Street	Built after a fire in an unknown year, reconstructed by the Dúbravka borough in 2001. Statues of Saint Florian were common in the public areas of settlements in the region in the past. He is depicted as a Roman soldier according to traditional iconography, pouring water on a burning house upon which he stands.
	Monument to those fallen in World War I / Pomník padlým v 1. sv. vojne	Jadranská Street	Monument to the citizens of Dúbravka who died fighting from 1914–1918, it was unveiled in 1928 by the Company of veteran soldiers of General M. R. Štefánik. The sandstone sculpture depicting the angel of death embracing a dying soldier was mastered by Alojz Rigele, the pedestal is 280 centimeters tall and made of fake stone. The monument contains the names and photographs of fallen soldiers, most of them of Croatian descent.
	Stone cross / Kamenný kríž	Brižitská Street, near the junction with Jadranská Street	Originally built in 1868 to commemorate the building of a rectory and Dúbravka getting its own priest, it had to be rebuilt in 1943. It was destroyed in 1945 during the Second World War, rebuilt in 1946 from the money from volunteers and it was reconstructed in 1993. The small stony cross sits atop a massive rectangular pedestal. The text on the monument translates as: "All of you walking down the road, watch and see if there is pain like mine / Built from alms / Year 1946".
	People's house / Ľudový dom	Jadranská Street No. 6	Built approximately in 1860, the large rural house served as a shop and local tavern, as well as fulfilling residential duties. It is a unique example of a multi-functional village house, which served as a dominant feature in the settlement. Today, the house is divided into two by an inside wall running along the length of the house.
	Cave of Our Lady of Lourdes / Jaskyňa Lurdskej Panny Márie	Brižitská Street	Built in 1947 by the village Dúbravka as a copy of the Cave of Our Lady of Lourdes from France, it consists of an artificial cave made of stone, built into the hillside with a statue of Saint Mary inside. Together with the nearby Chapel of Virgin Mary and local rectory it creates a historical area complete with hundreds of years old linden trees and chestnut trees, up to 22 meters in height.
	Monument of Virgin Mary / Pomník Panny Márie	Brižitská Street	Built in 1903 by spouses Ján Brankovič and Katarína (born Bartošová), reconstructed in 1927. The monument, located next to the Chapet of Virgin Mary and the Cave of Our Lady of Lourdes complex, consists of two rectangular parts. It was originally topped by a cross that is absent today. The lower part of the monument features dedication to its builders and the upper part contains a statue of Virgin Mary inside a shallow niche.
	Statue of Virgin Mary on a pillar / Socha Panny Márie na stĺpe	Tavárikova osada (kolónia), upper part of Švantnerova Street	Built in 1908 by Ferenczés (František) Tavarik, a Bratislava carpenter and merchant who established one of the first recreational areas in the city here in 1911–1912. The statue of Saint Mary rests on a tall column in classical architectural style which rests on a rectangular pedestal with engraving in the Hungarian language.
	Pillar of Virgin Mary / Stĺp Panny Márie	Mikuláša Schneidera Trnavského Street, between public transport stops Záluhy and Švantnerova.	Built in 1904 by Józef Rusznák. The statue rests on a tall column, both made of stone. The column features a rectangular base with a marble table attached with engraved text that translates as: "Come to me saddened and I will make you happy / Year 1865 / Z. V. P. F. / Josef Rusznak / Year 1904".
	Red cross / Červený kríž	Pri kríži Street, next to the fence of ZŠ Pri Kríži	Built by the village Dúbravka out of gratitude for ground water appearing in this somewhat arid area allowing good harvest. The wooden cross is painted red and contains a sculpture of Jesus Christ. It was reconstructed by the local government office in 1993 and again in 2008.
	Statue of Saint Wendelin / Socha sv. Vendelína	Vendelínska Street, next to the fence of ZŠ Dolinského	The baroque statue from the end of the 18th century depicts Saint Wendelin, the patron saint of shepherds in his standard iconography including cattle at his feet and a shepherd's crook in his hand. The pedestal is in the form of a rectangular pillar. It was reconstructed in 1928 and again 1993. The monument was originally in an unknown place, in the year 1970 it was moved into the area of the local rectory and in 1993 it was reconstructed in moved into its current place. In the past the pedestal consisted of three parts, a table containing engraved text was just underneath the statue and the monument used to be protected by a small metal roof.
	Gravestone of local priest Anton Moyš / Náhrobok miestneho katolíckeho farára Moyša	Dúbravka Cemetery - Strmé sady Street	Anton Moyš's gravestone is grey and rectangular with the words: "Ladislav Moyš / 8.4.1867-13.3.1950 / Roman Catholic priest / Co-founder and director of the Slovak Radio / R.I.P." engraved in golden letters.
	Gravestone of former president of Czechoslovakia Gustáv Husák / Náhrobok prezidenta ČSSR Dr. Husáka	Dúbravka Cemetery - Strmé sady Street	Gustáv Husák's gravestone is simple, grey and rectangular with the words "Dr. Gustáv Husák 1913-1991" engraved in white letters.
	Former school / Budova Miestneho úradu - Bývalá Obecná škola	Žatevná Street No. 2	Built on 6 November 1935 the local school building came into use on 31 December 1935. The building has a partial upper floor, the ground floor consists of a central hallway connecting individual classrooms. Currently, the building is the office of the Dúbravka local government.
	Monument (Picture) of Virgin Mary / Pomník (obraz) Panny Márie	Dúbravská hlavica (Devín Carpathians), next to a woodland path that connects to Brižitská Street.	The monument consists of a stone column topped by a metal frame with two pictures. The picture facing the road depicts the Assumption of Mary, the reverse side depicts the Saints Cosmas and Damian. The monument was built in an unknown year by a local resident for the saving of his life. It is a unique example of rural religious architecture.
	Horánska well / Horánska studňa	K Horánskej studni Street, inside a small park and children's playground	The former main village well from the 16th century used to contain water even in times of drought and it features in the coat of arms of Dúbravka. Surplus water flew into a pond, which fed a small stream. Later, pipeline into the local school was built as well as into the houses of some inhabitants. The above ground portion of the well is made of concrete with the following text engraved: "Horánska studňa / 1574 / 1993". The well, though closed and purely decorative, features a water drawing mechanism under the small roof. It was reconstructed in 1993.
	Statue of Andrej Bagar / Socha Andreja Bagara	Beňovského Street - Park of the Union	The bronze monument consists of two sculptures - a 5 meters tall statue of Slovak actor and director Andrej Bagar and a separate pedestal containing his name and dates of birth and death. The pedestal and the whole composition is by professor Dušan Kuzma, the statue was created by Slovak sculptor Ferdinand Bollo, both in 1984. The monument was unveiled at Hviezdoslavovo Square in the Old Town and it was moved to its current location in 2004, based on an agreement between Mayor of Dúbravka Peter Polák and the Mayor of Old Town Peter Čiernik. Due to the monument's size it was not installed in its proposed place at Bagarova Street next to the VÚB Bank.
	Statue of Ľudovít Štúr / Socha Ľudovíta Štúra	Pekníkova Street, pocket park next to ZŠ Pekníkova	Built in 1993, the monument consists of a rectangular pedestal made of polished stone with the bronze bust of Ľudovít Štúr on top. The bust is executed in minimalist style, with distinctive face features and facial hair consistent with the Štúr iconography. The pedestal contains the following text engraved: "Ľudovít Štúr / 1815-1856".

== Population ==
Population statistic (10 years)
Year	1995	2005	2015	2025
Count	38,954	34,540	33,090	35,300
Difference		−11.33%	−4.19%	+6.67%

Population statistic
Year	2024	2025
Count	35,518	35,300
Difference		−0.61%

It has a population of 35,300 people (31 December 2025).

The older generations of Croat-descended inhabitants have maintained their own dialect until the present day. Otherwise, their habits and way of life resemble those of the Záhorie people (a region north-west of Bratislava). The people of Dúbravka used to earn their living by working in agriculture, especially producing wine. Their goods were sold to the markets of Bratislava and Vienna.

Croats settled Dúbravka since the 1570s during the fourth wave of Croat settlement. In 1712 there lived 19 farmers and 6 workers without a house in the village. In 1720 and 1736 there were 43 farmers and 7 workers without a house. In 1768 population increased to 86 farmers and 7 workers without a house. First known mayor of Dúbravka was Joachim Milossovits (Zámoravkin) who signed a document from 1768.

After elections in 1906, Slovak language was used both in school and in the local government. In the 1930s people from Dúbravka worked mainly in stone and lime mines in Devínska Nová Ves or in the munitions factory at Patrónka.

=== Ethnicity ===
Census 2021 (1+ %)
Ethnicity	Number	Fraction
Slovak	32,192	88.91%
Not found out	2731	7.54%
Hungarian	794	2.19%
Czech	602	1.66%
Total	36,206	

In year 2021 was 36,206 people by ethnicity 32,192 as Slovak, 2731 as Not found out, 794 as Hungarian, 602 as Czech, 312 as Other, 176 as Rusyn, 126 as Russian, 115 as Ukrainian, 109 as German, 54 as Bulgarian, 50 as Polish, 44 as Croatian, 37 as Serbian, 33 as Romani, 32 as Moravian, 29 as Italian, 23 as Jewish, 19 as Austrian, 15 as French, 14 as Vietnamese, 14 as Canadian, 14 as English, 10 as Turkish, 10 as Albanian, 9 as Korean, 5 as Irish, 5 as Romanian, 5 as Greek, 3 as Chinese, 1 as Silesian and 1 as Iranian.

Note on population: The difference values of population numbers in the table "Population statistic" and in the sections "Ethnicity" & "Religion" is caused by the use of various statistical methods.

=== Religion ===
Census 2021 (1+ %)
Religion	Number	Fraction
None	16,004	44.2%
Roman Catholic Church	13,848	38.25%
Not found out	2982	8.24%
Evangelical Church	1504	4.15%
Greek Catholic Church	454	1.25%
Total	36,206	

In year 2021 was 36,206 people by religion 16,004 from None, 13,848 from Roman Catholic Church, 2982 from Not found out, 1504 from Evangelical Church, 454 from Greek Catholic Church, 215 from Ad hoc movements, 197 from Eastern Orthodox Church, 181 from Other, 140 from Other and not ascertained christian church, 109 from Calvinist Church, 92 from Buddhism, 82 from Christian Congregations in Slovakia, 75 from Islam, 63 from Jehovah's Witnesses, 50 from Paganism and natural spirituality, 38 from Jewish community, 38 from Church of the Brethren, 26 from Baptists Church, 22 from Seventh-day Adventist Church, 22 from Apostolic Church, 14 from Bahá'i Community, 13 from Hinduism, 12 from Czechoslovak Hussite Church, 10 from Old Catholic Church, 9 from United Methodist Church, 5 from Church of Jesus Christ of Latter-day Saints and 1 from New Apostolic Church.

== Politics ==
List of Mayors of Dúbravka and political parties that nominated them:

- 1990 – 1994 – Ján Rössel (independent)
- 1994 – 1998 – Otto Riesz (KDH, DS, OKS, DÚ, SDĽ)
- 1998 – 2002 – Peter Polák (independent)
- 2002 – 2006 – Peter Polák (SDKÚ-DS)
- 2006 – 2010 – Ján Sandtner (independent)
- 2010 – 2014 – Ján Sandtner (independent)
- 2014 - 2018 - Martin Zaťovič (Sieť, SDKÚ-DS, KDH, Most–Híd, NOVA, OKS, SaS, SZ, EDS)
- 2018 - 2022 - Martin Zaťovič (SaS, OĽaNO, KDH, SME RODINA, OKS, NOVA, Zmena Zdola)

== Religion ==
=== Catholic churches ===
Catholic churches in Dúbravka

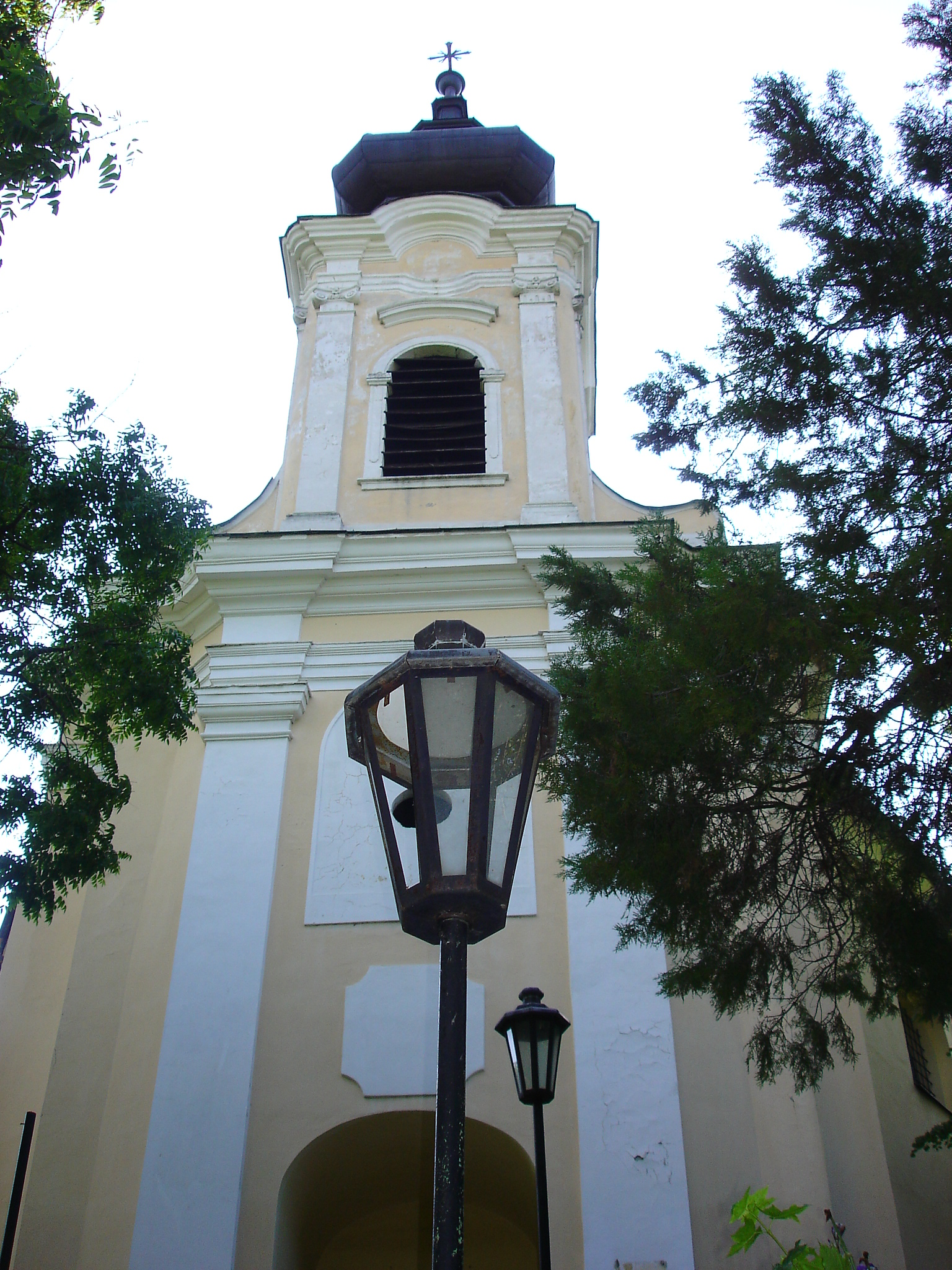
Church of St Cosmas and Damian

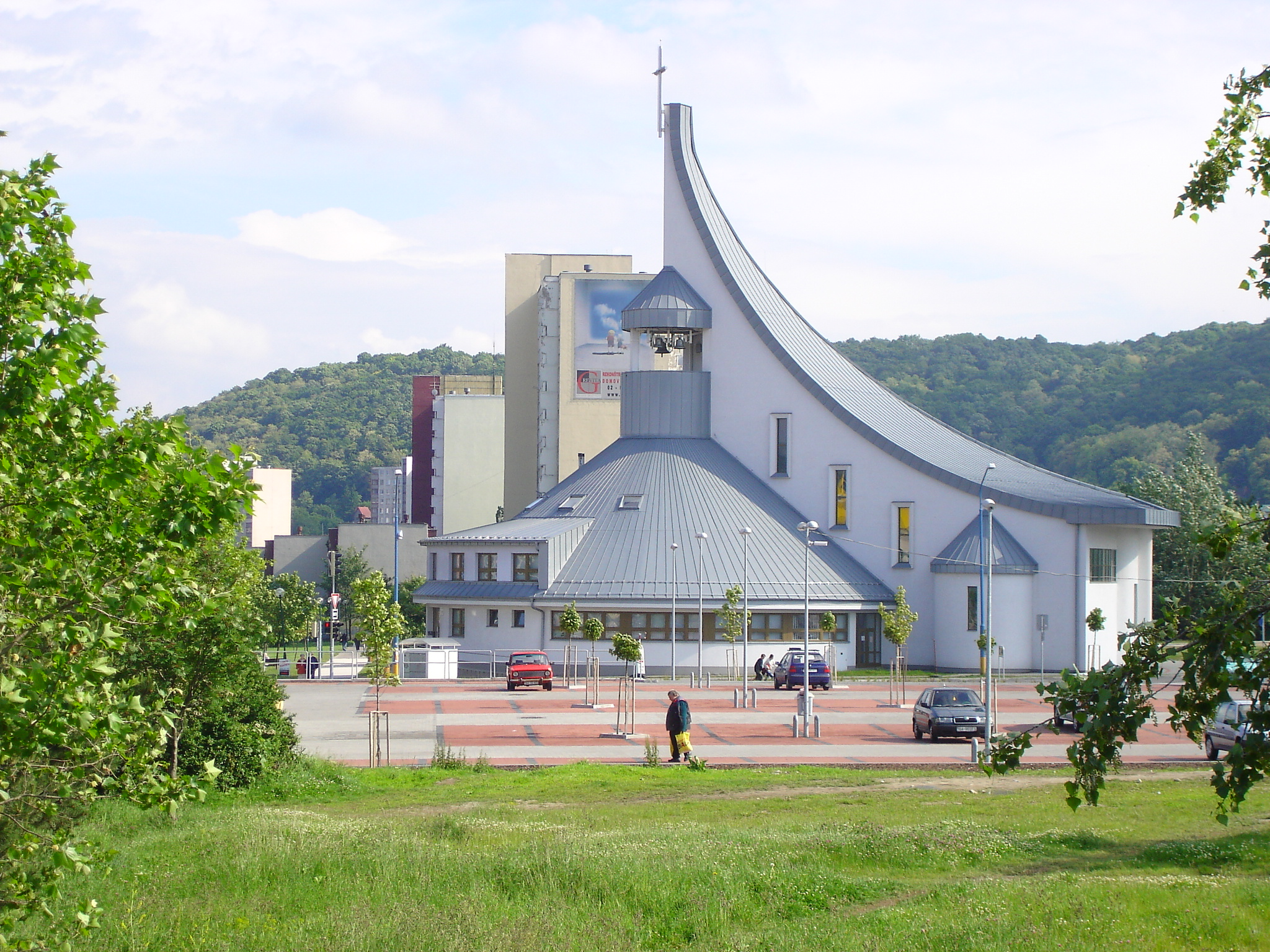
Church of the Holy Spirit

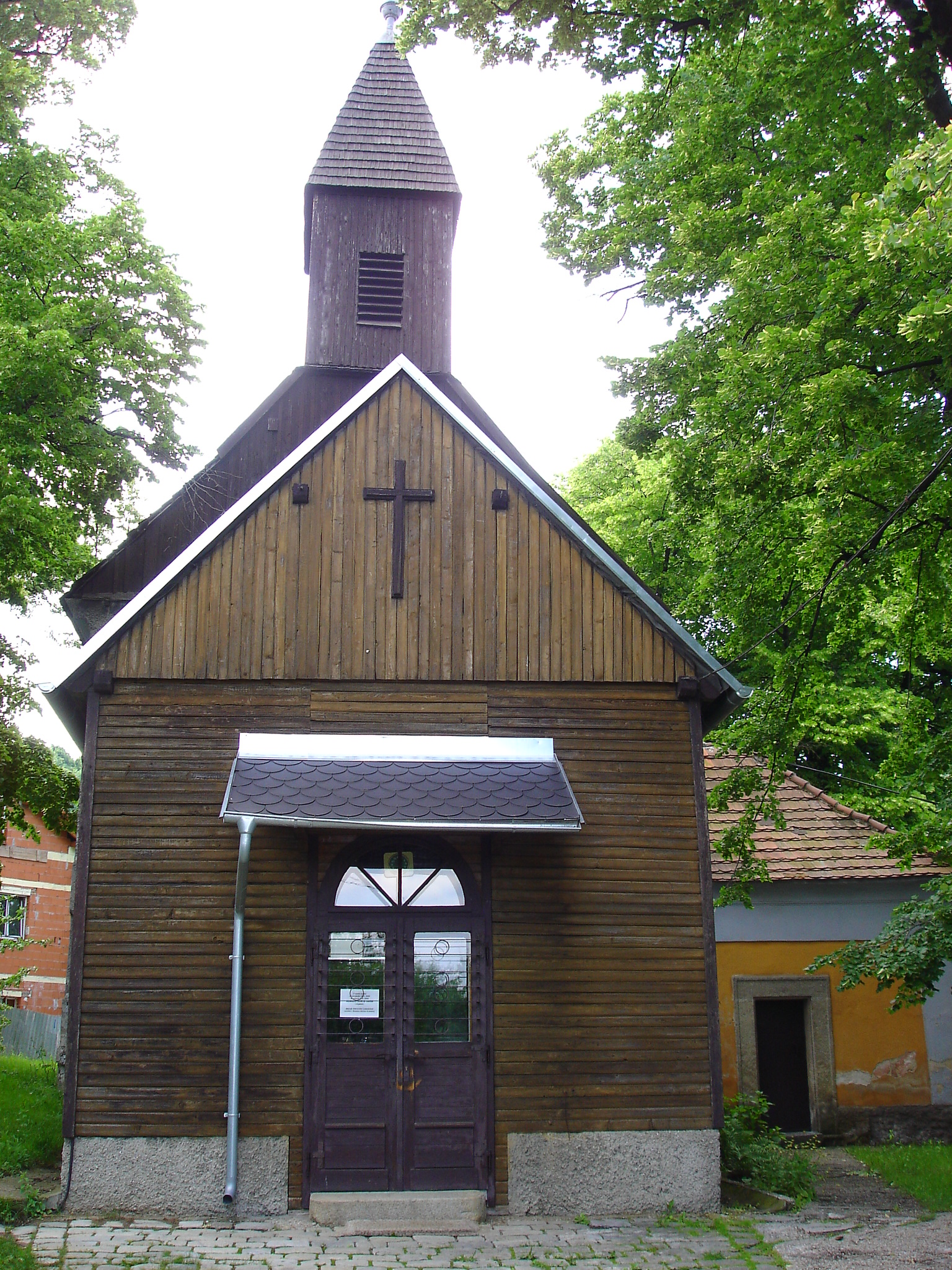
Chapel of Virgin Mary

The Roman Catholic Church of St Cosmas and Damian was built in 1720 as a subsidiary church of the Devín parish. It features an elliptic ground-plan and interior decorations from the year 1722.

The Roman Catholic Church of the Holy Spirit is located in M. Sch. Trnavského Street. The building's maintenance has been sponsored by the Roman Catholic Church, mostly from fundraising and financial donations from churchgoers. One million Slovak Crowns was given by the municipal government. The foundations of the building were sanctified by Pope John Paul II during his visit to Slovakia in Šaštín. The church has an unorthodox design with an unconventional roof shape; it is 30 metres high and has the shape of a circle. It includes both the temple and the pastor's sector. It was designed by Ing. Arch. Ľudovít Režuch and Ing. Arch. Marián Lupták, who also designed the interior. The capacity of the church is about 600 people. The sound distribution quality is high due to the building design, as well as the arrangement of loud-speakers.

The Chapel of Virgin Mary is located in Old Dúbravka together with the cave of Our Lady of Lourdes. The chapel probably started as an unfinished baroque church. It features a late-baroque main altar with a picture of Virgin Mary held by angels and a side altar. It also includes statues of Saint Joseph and Virgin Mary. Even before the construction of the artificial cave, it was a minor pilgrimage site, one out of four most important for local Croats.

=== Evangelical church ===
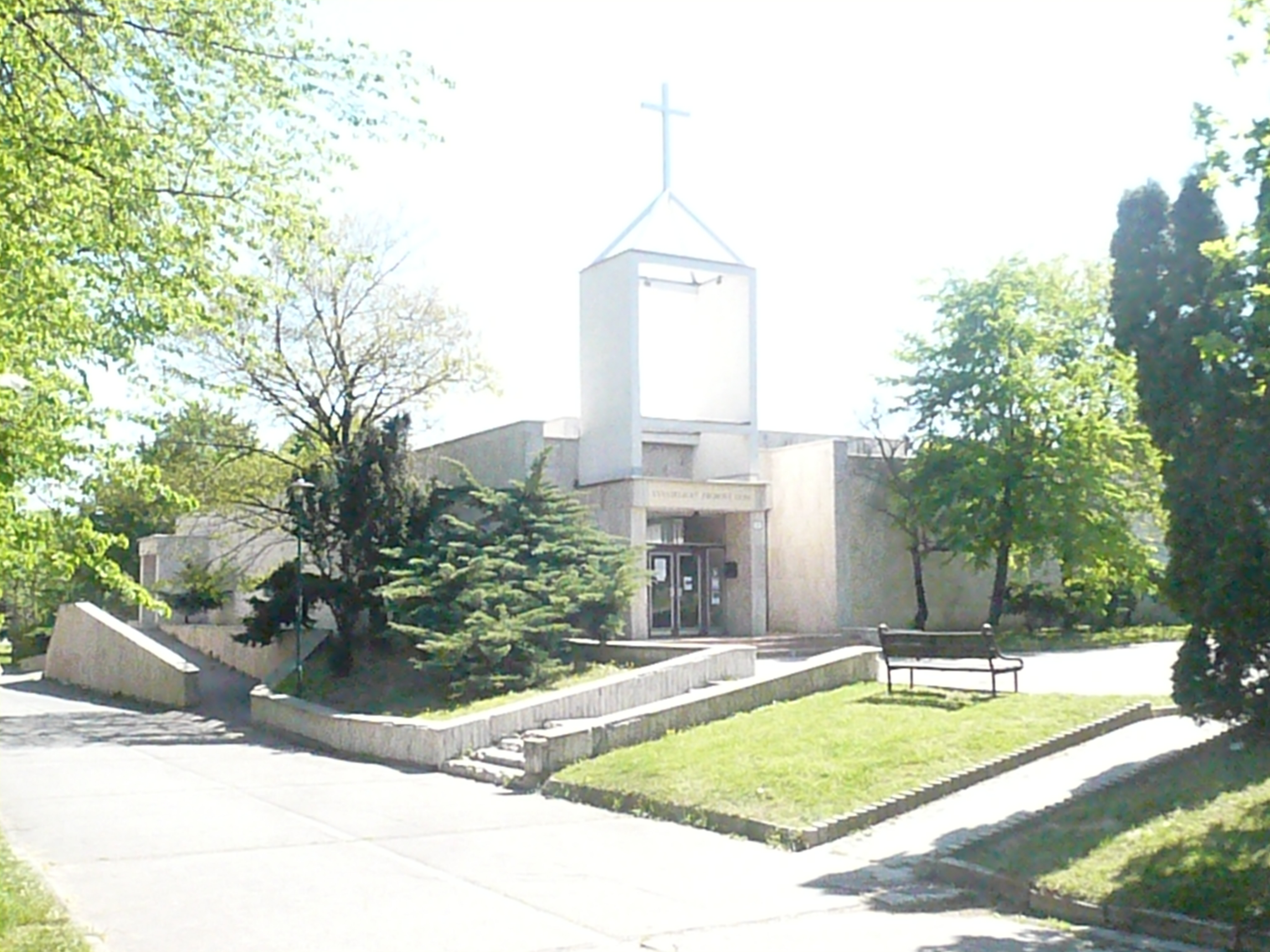
Evangelical church in Dúbravka

The church is located in Mikuláša Schneidera Trnavského Street. Originally built as local ceremonial hall, the building is a place of regular worship service from 1995. It has a squared shape and marble lining, outside is a park and small parking slot. The capacity of the church is approximately 200 people in the main hall and this could be expanded up to 300 people by using the minor hall.

Inside the church there is octangular white marble font made as a commemoration to the first Christians creed and traditions. In the main hall there is ca. 4m high wooden cross and a religious artwork Credo.

The church is a center for the evangelical believers from the fourth Bratislava district.

== Media ==
The Dúbravka local government funds its own magazine, local TV station and webpage.

- Dúbravský spravodajca - Established in 1992, it was called Dúbravské noviny until April 2007, when it was renamed and redesigned. It is distributed free to the majority of households in Dúbravka. Circulation is approximately 16,000 issues.
- Dúbravská televízia - Established in 1999, the local TV station broadcasts 24-hours a day since 2004.
- www.dubravka.sk - In 2008, the homepage was redesigned by the company Alejtech, until this date the web page did not conform to the Act No. 275/2006 Standards for information systems of public administration.

== Education ==
Dúbravka features 12 high-schools, 9 elementary schools and 13 kindergartens. There is no university in the city borough. Dúbravka also features 2 language schools; Súkromná jazyková škola COGITATIO and Vzdelávacie centrum FREEDU.

- High-school equivalent: Gymnázium (Bilíkova Street No. 24), Pedagogická a sociálna akadémia (Bullova Street No. 2), Stredná priemyselná škola elektrotechnická (Karola Adlera Street No. 5), SŠ - Praktická škola (J. Valašťana-Dolinského Street No. 1), Súkromné gymnázium ALKANA (Batkova Street No. 2), Súkromné konzervatórium ALKANA (Batkova Street No. 2), Súkromná pedagogická škola (Bullova Street No. 2), Súkromná stredná odborná škola veterinárna (Bullova Street No. 2), Súkromné gymnázium (Batkova Street No. 2), Súkromné gymnázium COGITATIO (Batkova Street No. 2), Združená stredná škola potravinárska (Harmincova Street No. 1), Súkromná obchodná akadémia COGITATIO (Batkova Street No. 2)
- Elementary schools: ZŠ Beňovského 1, ZŠ Nejedlého 8, ZŠ Pri kríži 11, ZŠ Sokolíkova 2, Špeciálna základná škola J. Valašťana-Dolinského 1, Súkromná základná škola HARMÓNIA (1.-4.roč.) Batkova 2, Súkromná základná škola s materskou školou The British International School Bratislava J. Valašťana-Dolinského 1, Základná umelecká škola Eugena Suchoňa Batkova 2, Súkromná základná umelecká škola ALKANA Batkova 2
- Kindergartens: MŠ Cabanova 44 (4 classes, 96 kids), MŠ Damborského 3 (4 classes, 97 kids), MŠ Galbavého 5 (4 classes, 98 kids), MŠ Ožvoldíkova 15 (4 classes, 96 kids), MŠ Pekníkova 4 (2 classes, 46 kids), MŠ Pri kríži 2 (4 classes, 96 kids), MŠ Sekurisova 10 (4 classes, 94 kids), MŠ Švantnerova 1 (4 classes, 93 kids), MŠ Ušiakova 1 (4 classes, 95 kids), Cirkevná materská škola Gianny Berettovej Bilíkova 1 (4 classes), Súkromná materská škola WONDERLAND Bazovského 4, Špeciálna materská škola J. Valašťana Dolinského 1, Súkromná materská škola Svetielko Pekníkova 4

The British International School Bratislava, a British international school, is located in two campuses in Dúbravka.

== Sports ==
Dúbravka features numerous sport venues. Football is represented by the local football club ŠKP Inter Dúbravka with prep and junior teams playing in the second league as well as by the local Police Football team. Women's football team FK Dúbravka offers two classes – junior and senior, playing in the first league. All teams are based in local football stadium FK Dúbravka. Local ice hockey club Hoba Bratislava is based in Dúbravka ice hockey stadium and it concentrates mainly on working with youth.

Dúbravka features also a shooting and archery range opened for shooting clubs and individuals used mainly for sport and entertainment shooting, but also as a training centre for police forces. Archery is represented by the successful Archery club Bratislava which is coached by Alistair Whittingham.

== Notable people ==
- Gustáv Husák (1913–1991), president of Czechoslovakia, buried at the Dúbravka cemetery

== Gallery ==
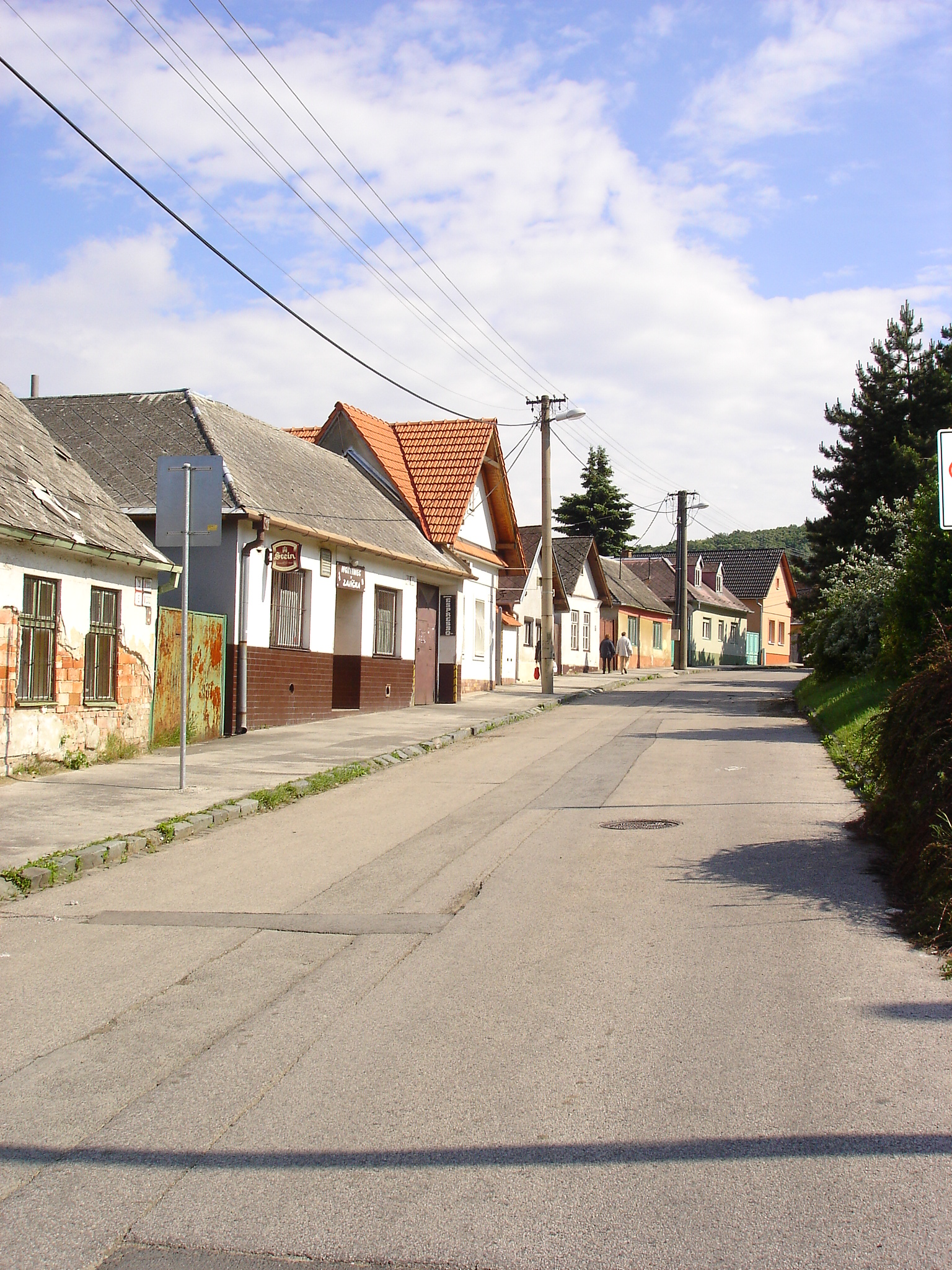
A street in Old Dúbravka

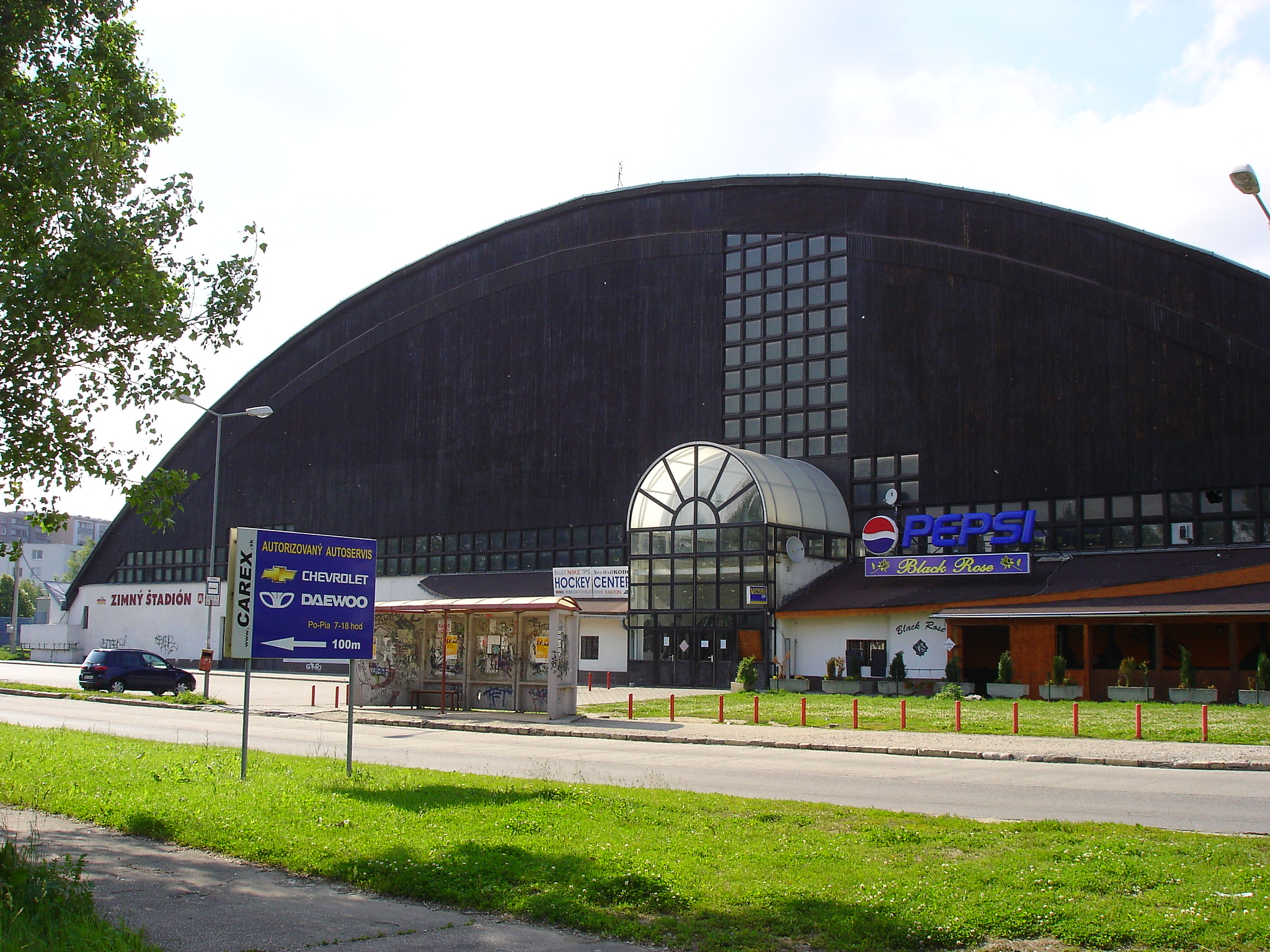
Dúbravka ice hockey stadium

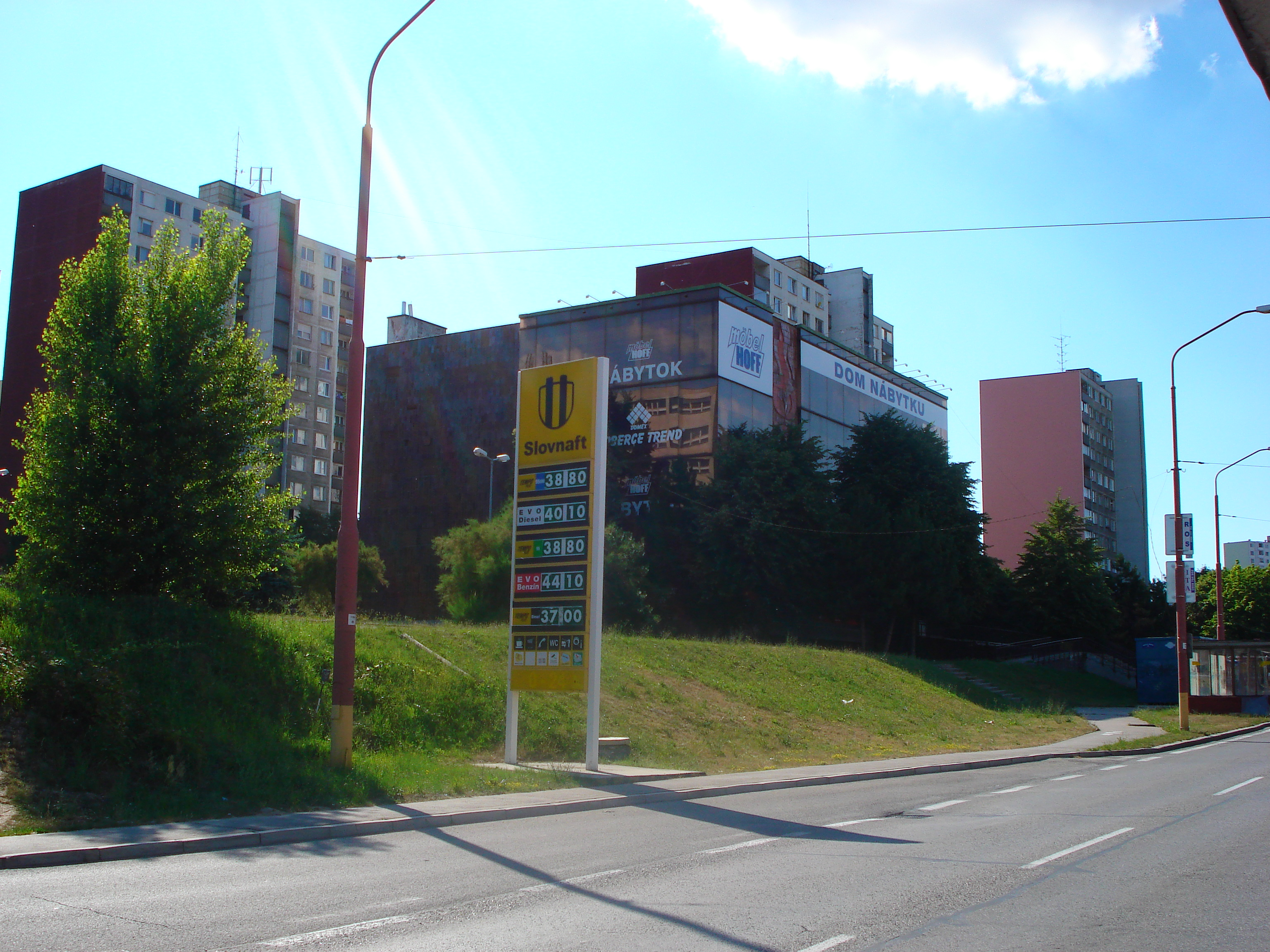
Iconic building called Skleník

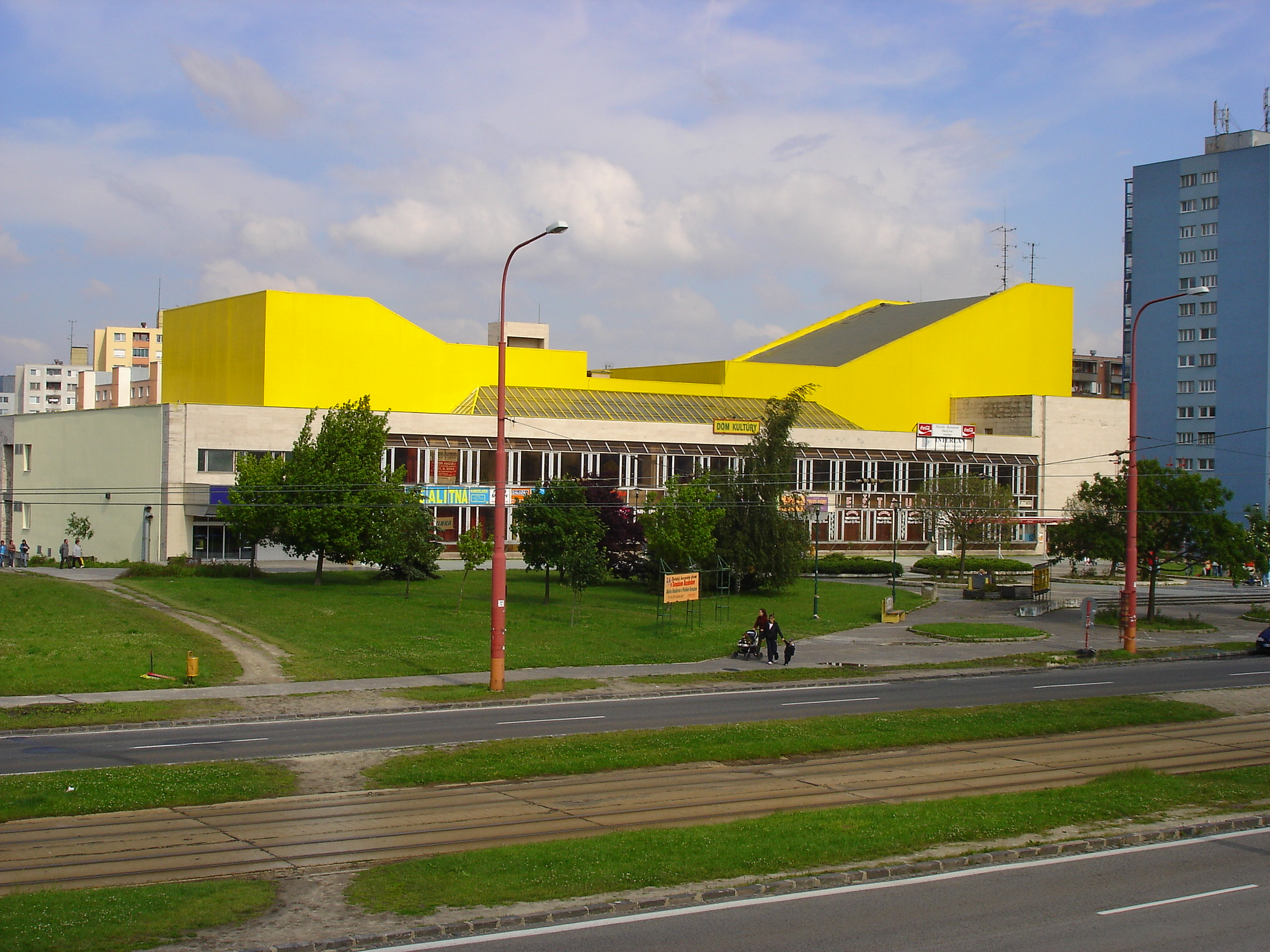
House of Culture Dúbravka

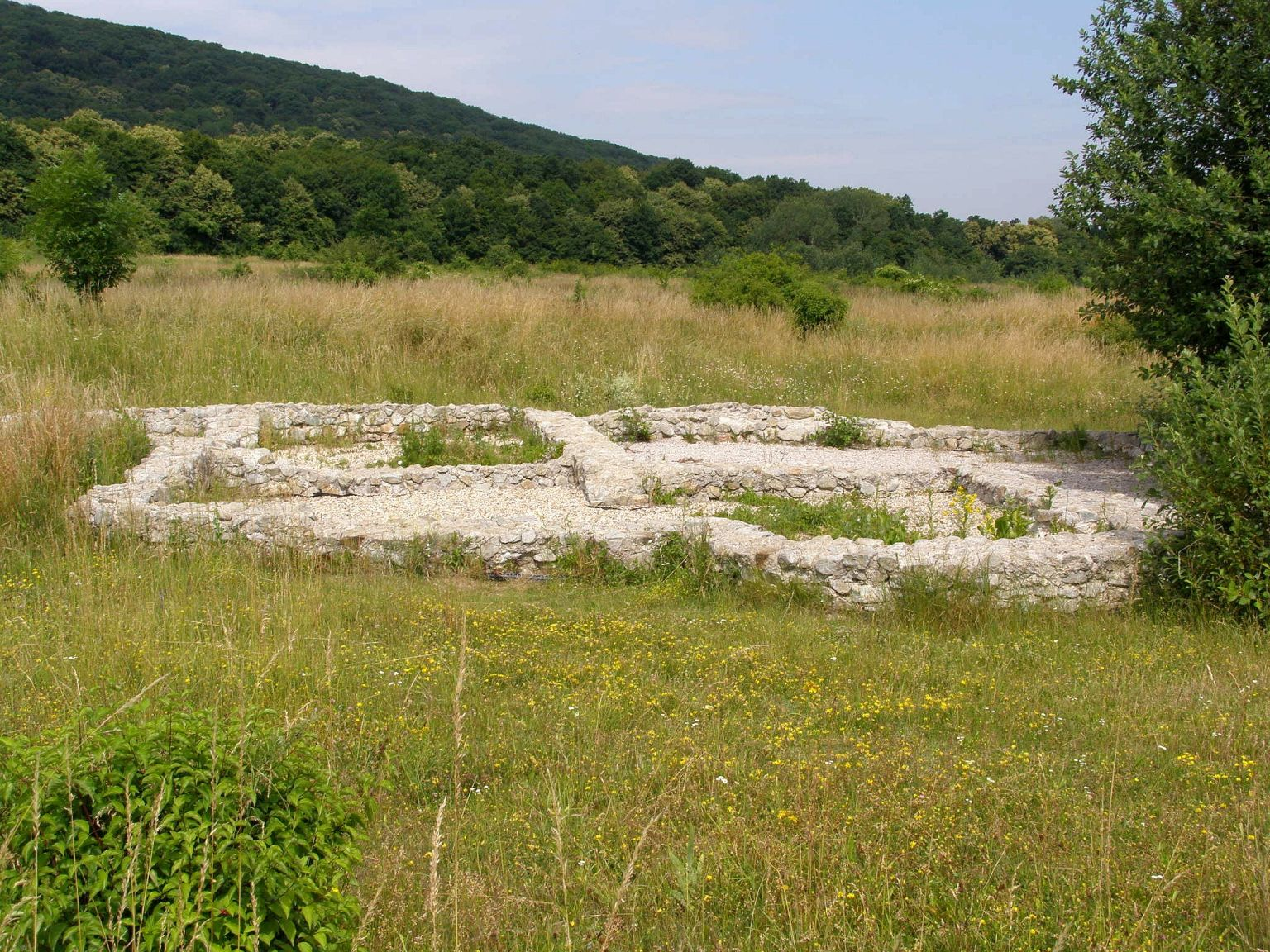
Romano-Germanic archaeological site from the 3rd century
