= Devín =

- Borough
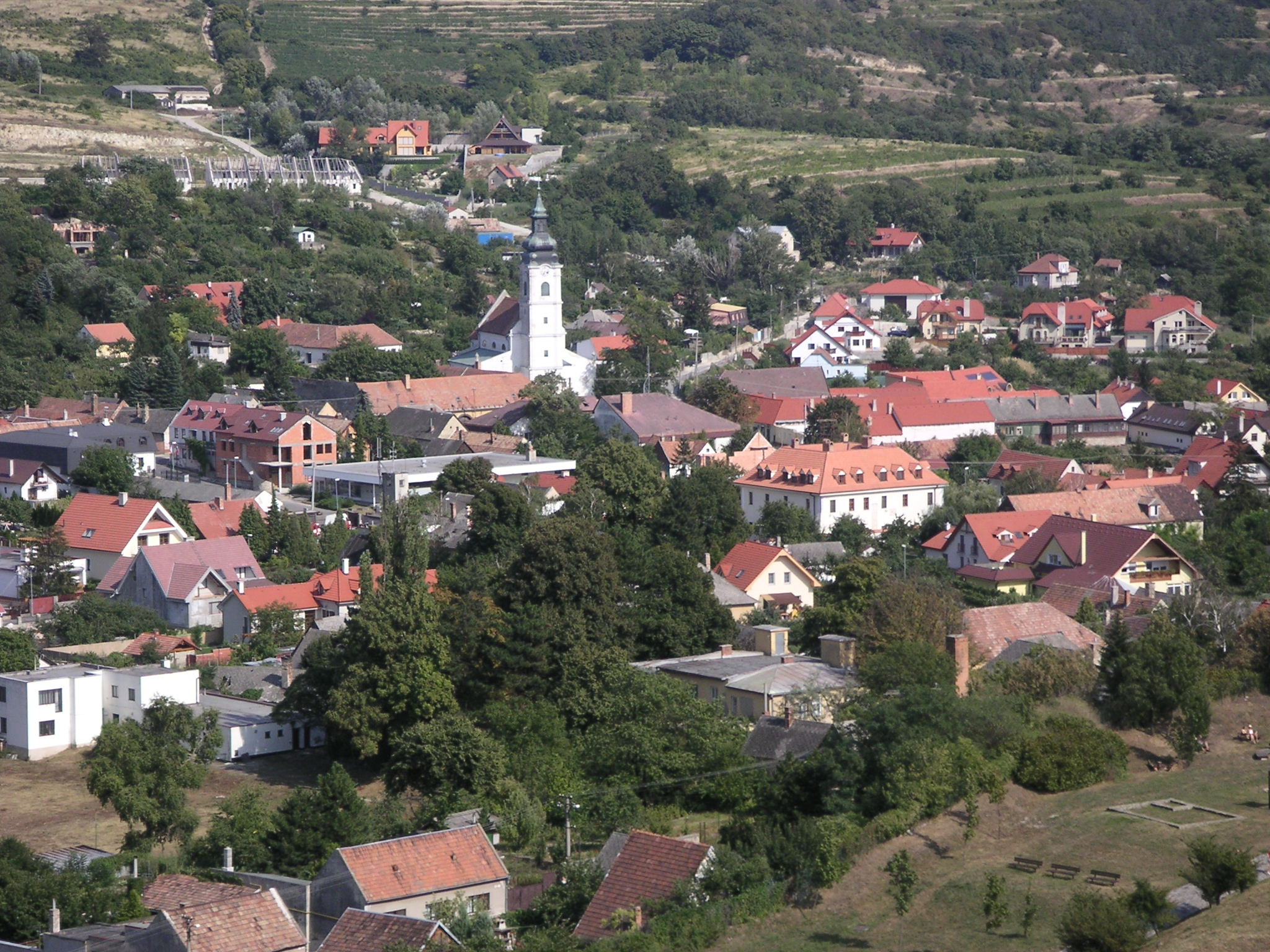

- Coat of arms

- Area of Devín in Bratislava

- Location of Devín in Slovakia
- Coordinates: 48°08′00″N 17°07′00″E
- Country: Slovakia
- Region: Bratislava Region
- District: Bratislava IV
- First mentioned: 864 (Julian)

Government
  - Mayor: Jana Jakubkovič

Area
  - Total: 13.96 km^{2} (5.39 sq mi)
- Elevation: 158 m (518 ft)

Population (2025)
  - Total: 2,165
- Time zone: UTC+1 (CET)
  - Summer (DST): UTC+2 (CEST)
- Postal code: 841 10
- Area code: +421-2
- Vehicle registration plate (until 2022): BL, BA, BT
- Website: www.devin.sk

Devín (Slovak pronunciation: [ˈɟeʋiːn], Hungarian: Dévény, German: Theben) is a borough of Bratislava, the capital of Slovakia, located in the Bratislava IV district. Originally a separate village at the confluence of the Danube and Morava rivers, Devín maintained its rural character and today, it is one of the smallest boroughs of Bratislava by population. It is an important archaeological site, featuring the ruins of Devín Castle.

Geographically, Devín lies on the foothills of Devínska Kobyla next to the Devín Gate, a narrow stretch on the river Danube, which was viewed as the western gateway to the Kingdom of Hungary. It lies near the border between Slovakia and Austria which runs down the middle of the Morava and Danube rivers, and which previously formed part of the Iron Curtain between the Eastern and the Western Bloc.

The word Devín stems from the Slovak word deva, which signifies "a lass".

== Location ==
Devín is bordered by Austria from the south and from the west, the borough of Devínska Nová Ves from the north, the borough of Dúbravka from the east and the borough of Karlova Ves from the south-east.

== Geography ==
The municipality lies at an altitude of 158 metres (518 ft) and covers an area of 13.96 km^{2} (5.39 sq mi) (2025).

== Transport ==
- Buses
  - Line 29
- Night buses
  - Line N29

== History ==
Thanks to its strategic location at the confluence of the rivers Danube and Morava, the nearby cliff was an ideal place for a fort. The site has been settled since the Neolithic and both the Celts and Romans built forts here. The town has been claimed as a capital for the mysterious early medieval Samo's Empire.

In 1241 the Austrians defeated the Mongols in the battle at the River Morava in Theben, saving Vienna, and Austria from the Mongols forever.

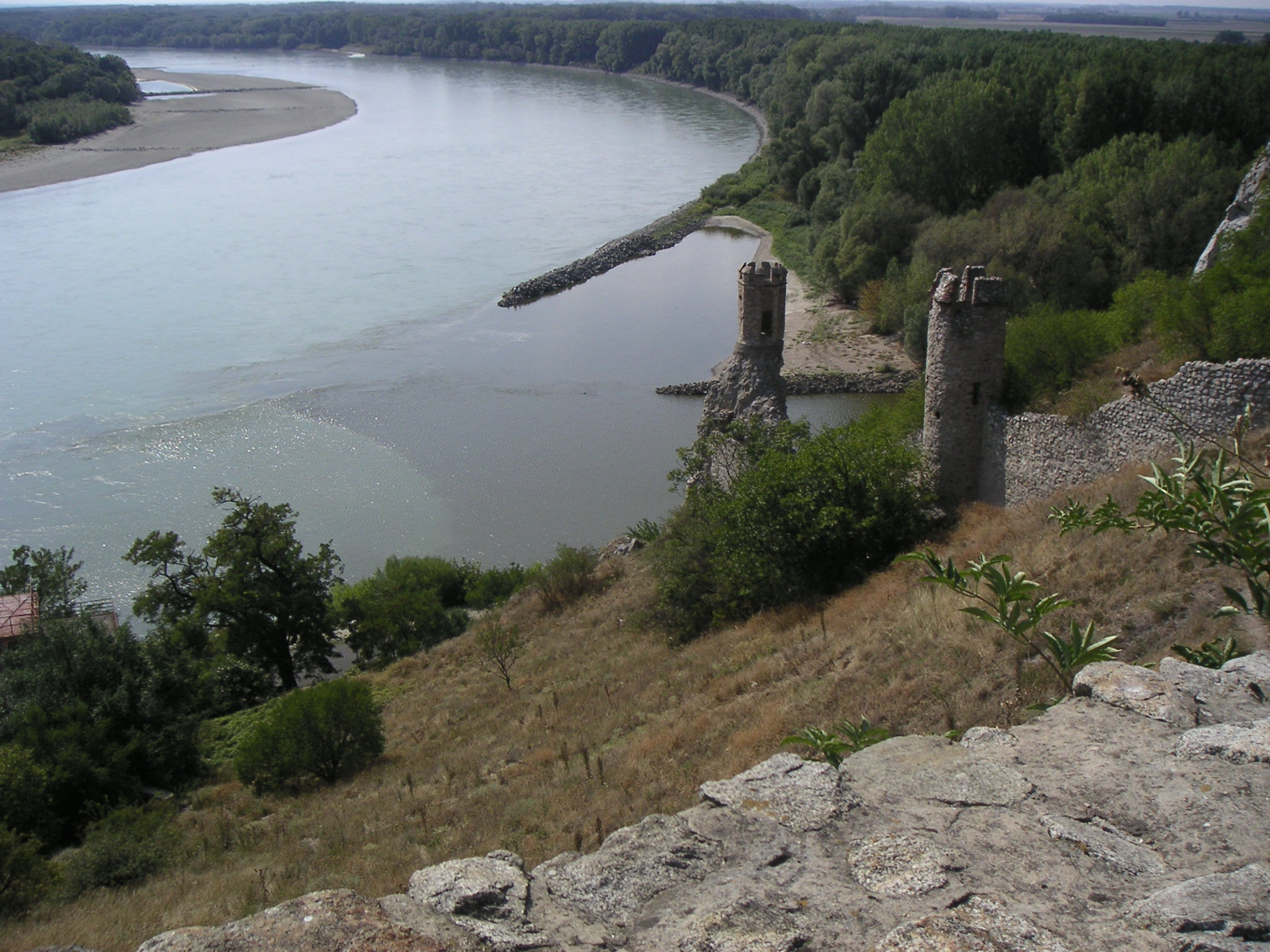
Devín Castle above the Danube

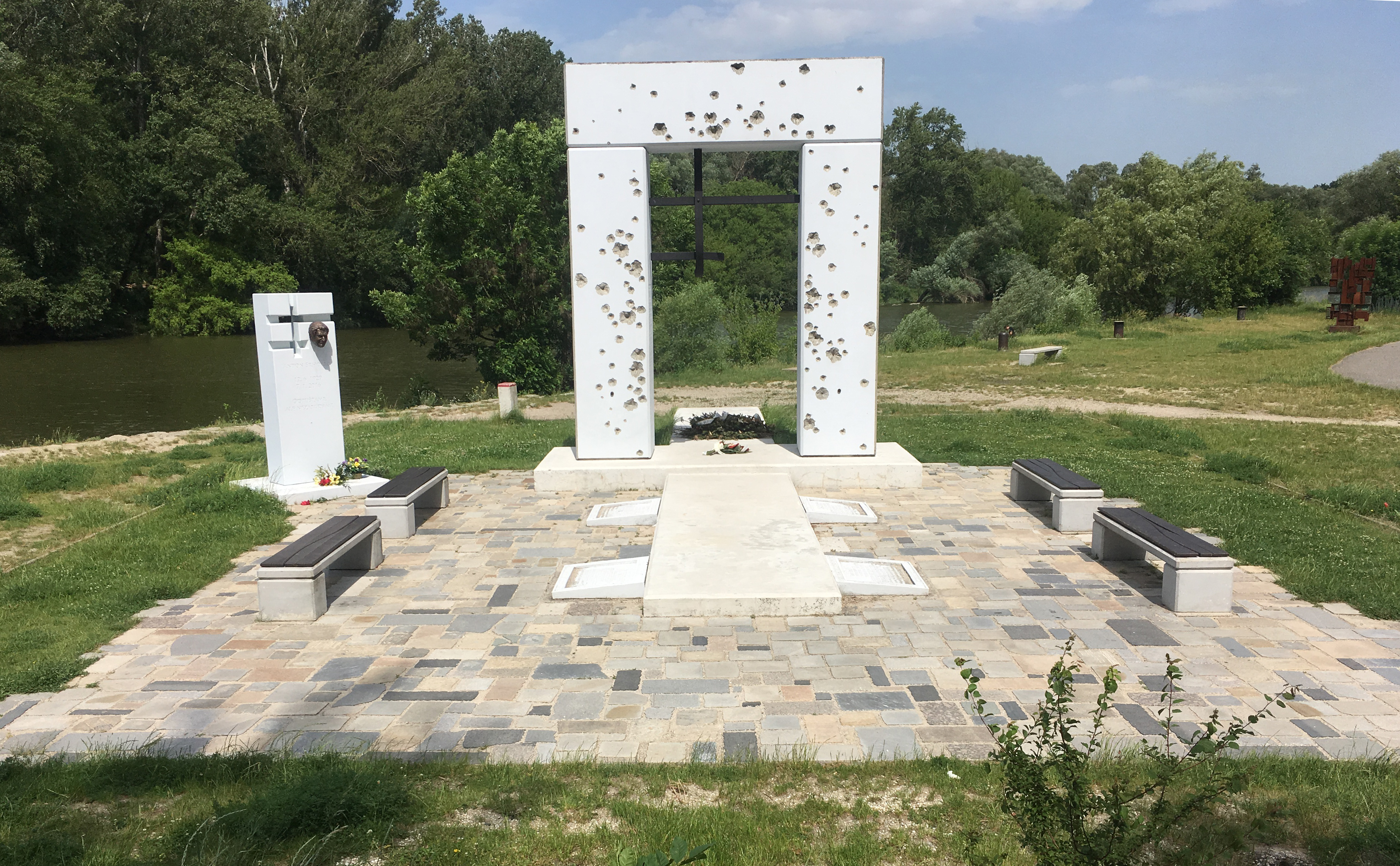
Iron Curtain memorial at Devín

Devín was first mentioned in a document from 1237 under the name Villa Thebyn. Originally, it was a small village, belonging to the Devín Castle, but quickly attained the status of a small town in the 15th century. In 1568, Devín became separated from its former owner. Croats fleeing from the approaching Ottomans in the south settled here in the 16th century. The castle above the village was burned down by Napoleon's troops in 1809. Due to its mainly German population the village was ceded to Germany as part of the Munich Agreement in 1938. From October 1938 to April 1945, Devín was part of the German Third Reich, being part of Lower Austria. In 1946, Devín was returned to Czechoslovakia and became part of Bratislava. The German inhabitants were expelled.

During the Cold War Devín was just inside the Iron Curtain and the northern banks of the Danube and Morava rivers were heavily fortified. The border fortifications were dismantled after the Velvet Revolution of 1989, and there is now free access to the riverbank.

== Characteristics ==
Devín is part of Bratislava, yet differs from the rest of the city due to its rural character. As a popular recreation center, it offers an ancient castle located on a spectacular cliff, hiking trails in the hilly areas around the village, large gardens and vineyards, as well as opportunities for quiet walks along the Danube. Good bus connections with the center of Bratislava are a part of the municipal public transportation system. Most of the people commute to work elsewhere in Bratislava.

Devín is quite commonly flooded by the Morava and Danube rivers, with the strongest flood in recent history being in August 2002. To fight the floods the use of a Wide Net has been cast. Results still pending to determine efficiency.

The borough hosts the oldest organized running event in Slovakia, the National Run Devín-Bratislava, which is almost 12 kilometres long and takes place each year after Easter.

== Population ==
Population statistic (10 years)
Year	1995	2005	2015	2025
Count	733	1005	1297	2165
Difference		+37.10%	+29.05%	+66.92%

Population statistic
Year	2024	2025
Count	2124	2165
Difference		+1.93%

It has a population of 2165 people (31 December 2025).

=== Ethnicity ===
Census 2021 (1+%)
Ethnicity	Number	Fraction
Slovak	1709	89.38%
Not found out	120	6.27%
Czech	37	1.93%
Hungarian	33	1.72%
Other	32	1.67%
Total	1912	

In year 2021 was 1912 people by ethnicity 1709 as Slovak, 120 as Not found out, 37 as Czech, 33 as Hungarian, 32 as Other, 13 as Ukrainian, 11 as Russian, 11 as German, 6 as Rusyn, 6 as Austrian, 4 as Serbian, 4 as Korean, 4 as Bulgarian, 3 as Jewish, 3 as French, 3 as Croatian, 1 as Italian, 1 as Romanian, 1 as Polish, 1 as Moravian, 1 as Canadian and 1 as Albanian.

Note on population: The difference values of population numbers in the table "Population statistic" and in the sections "Ethnicity" & "Religion" is caused by the use of various statistical methods.

=== Religion ===
Census 2021 (1+%)
Religion	Number	Fraction
None	966	50.52%
Roman Catholic Church	649	33.94%
Not found out	129	6.75%
Evangelical Church	67	3.5%
Eastern Orthodox Church	20	1.05%
Total	1912	

In year 2021 was 1912 people by religion 966 from None, 649 from Roman Catholic Church, 129 from Not found out, 67 from Evangelical Church, 20 from Eastern Orthodox Church, 18 from Other, 17 from Greek Catholic Church, 10 from Ad hoc movements, 9 from Buddhism, 6 from Jewish community, 5 from Other and not ascertained christian church, 4 from Calvinist Church, 4 from Christian Congregations in Slovakia, 3 from Paganism and natural spirituality, 2 from Baptists Church, 1 from Islam, 1 from Hinduism and 1 from United Methodist Church.

== Gallery ==
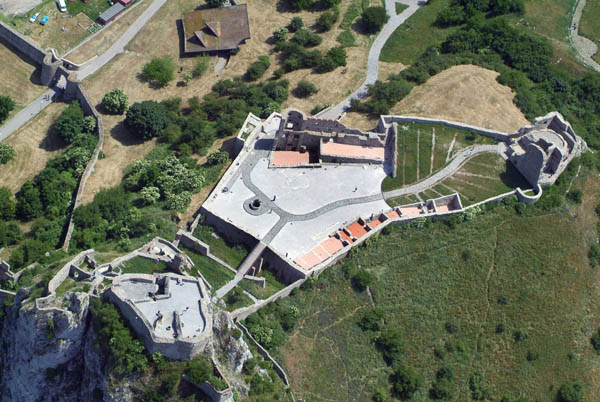

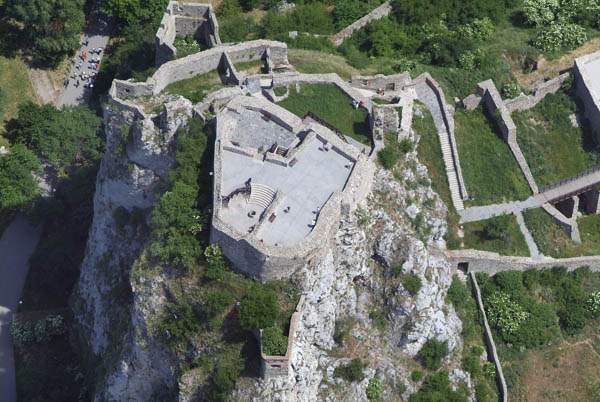

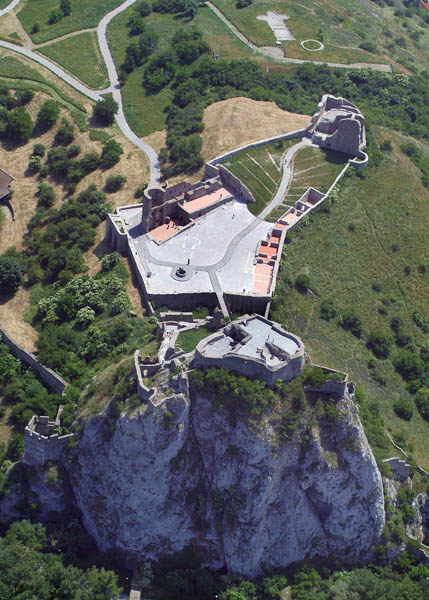

== See also ==
- Devín Carpathians
