= Rudolf Sloboda =

Slovak writer (1938–1995)

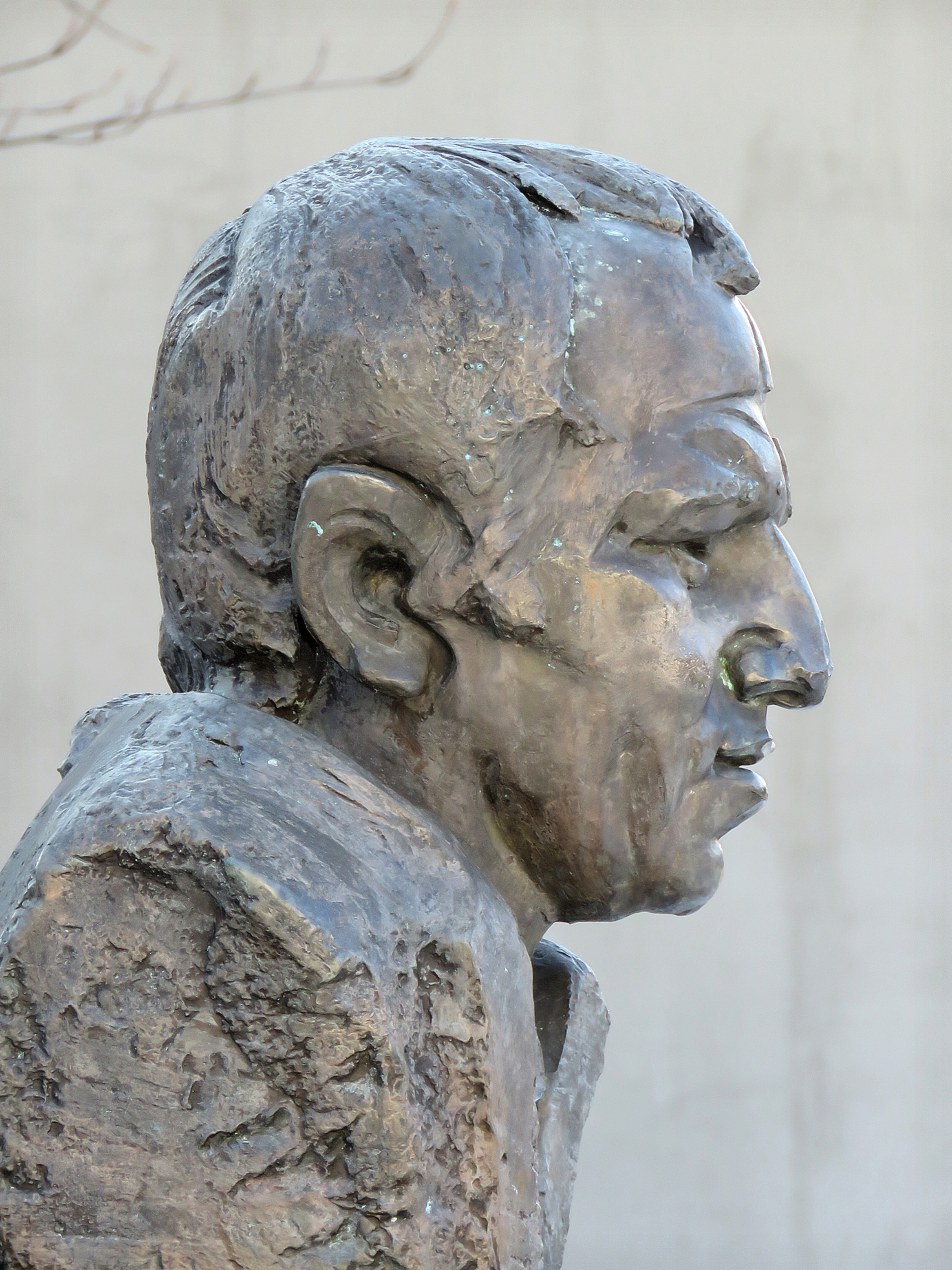
- Rudolf Sloboda Memorial in Bratislava-Devínská Nová Ves
- Born: 16 April 1938; Devínska Nová Ves, Czechoslovakia
- Died: 6 October 1995 (aged 57); Bratislava, Slovakia
- Occupations: novelist, playwright, screenwriter, poet
- Writing career
- Period: 1965–1995

Rudolf Sloboda (16 April 1938 – 6 October 1995) was a Slovak novelist, playwright, screenwriter, poet and author of children's and young adult literature.

== Life and career ==
Rudolf Sloboda was born in Devínska Nová Ves (today a borough of Bratislava) into a family of Croatian ancestry just before the outbreak of World War II. After discontinuing his studies in philosophy at Comenius University in Bratislava, he worked in various professions. He was a miner in Bohemia and a construction worker in Bratislava. From 1959 to 1962, he worked as an editor at the Smena publishing house, and from 1972 to 1984, as a dramaturge in Slovak film production in Bratislava. He then became a professional worker at the Institute of Art Criticism and Theatre Documentation.

Since 1988, he had been a freelance writer, dedicating himself exclusively to literary work. He lived with his wife in Devínská Nová Ves until 1995, when he died by suicide, hanging himself with a bicycle chain.

== Works ==
During his lifetime, he wrote over twenty novels, including debut novel Narcis (Narcissus, 1965), Uršuľa (Ursula, 1987), and Krv (Blood, 1991). His works primarily explored ordinary human experiences, often inspired by his own life, with protagonists grappling with complicated relationships, jealousy, violence, sex and loneliness. A recurring theme in all his stories was the search for the meaning of life. The majority of his novels are first-person narratives with tragic themes. He also wrote autobiographical prose.

In addition to his prose, Sloboda wrote poetry collections and screenplays for film and theatre. He played a significant role as a screenwriter and playwright at the Astorka Korzo '90 theatre. His contributions to the film industry include the screenplay for Karline manželstvá (Caroline's Marriages, 1980) and the psychological drama Dušička (A Small Soul, 1995), which portrays a marriage with a mentally ill woman.

Sloboda also appeared on screen as an actor, for instance, in Fajnor's film Sen - jama vo mne (A Dream - A Hole Within Me) and Šulík's Všetko, čo mám rád (Everything I Love), both released in 1992.
