= Záhorská Bystrica =

- Borough
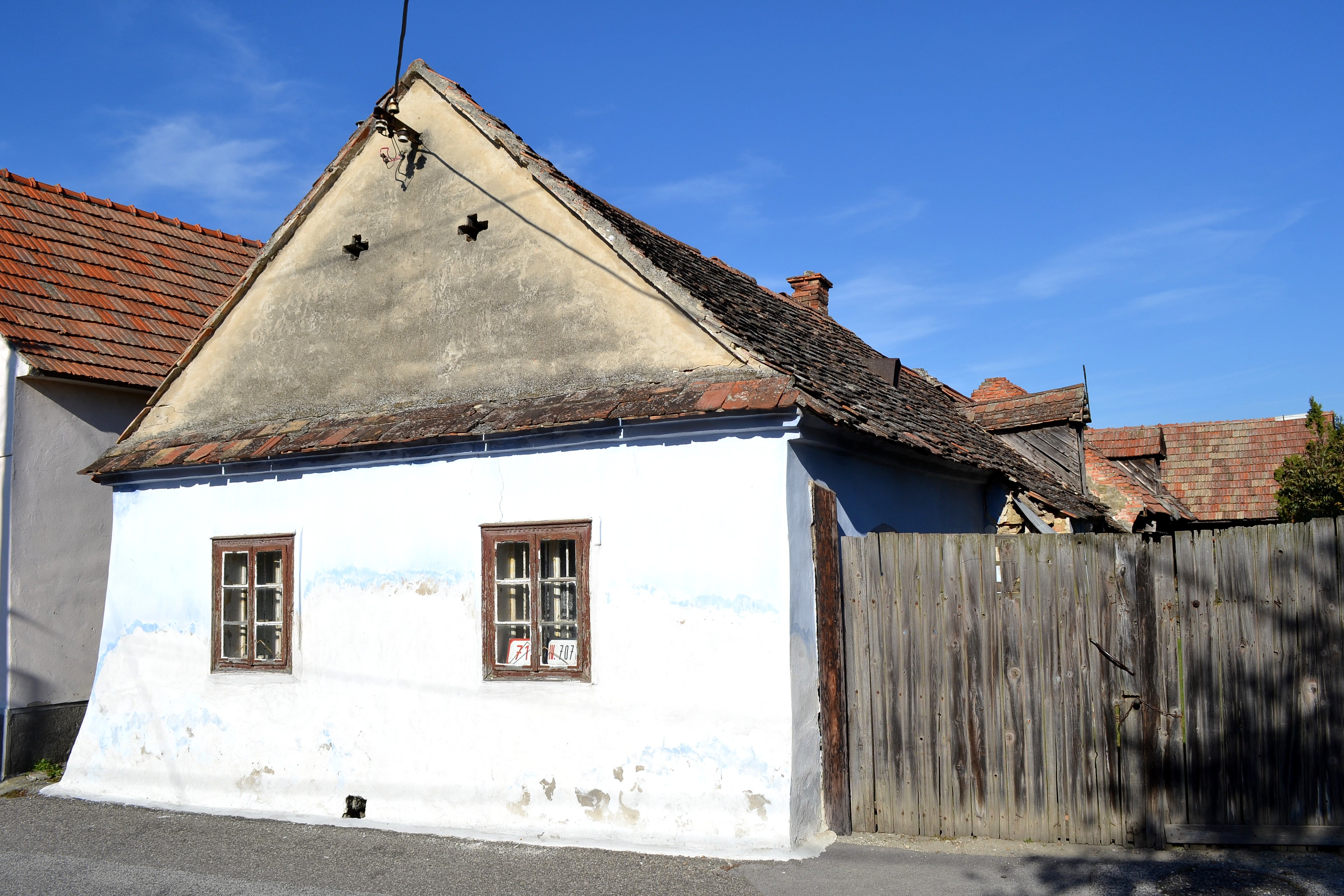
- Preserved peasant house in Záhorská Bystrica

- Coat of arms

- Area of Záhorská Bystrica in Bratislava

- Location of Záhorská Bystrica in Slovakia
- Coordinates: 48°08′00″N 17°07′00″E
- Country: Slovakia
- Region: Bratislava Region
- District: Bratislava IV
- First mentioned: 1314 (Julian)

Government
  - Mayor: Jozef Krúpa

Area
  - Total: 32.29 km^{2} (12.47 sq mi)
- Elevation: 175 m (574 ft)

Population (2025)
  - Total: 8,009
- Time zone: UTC+1 (CET)
  - Summer (DST): UTC+2 (CEST)
- Postal code: 841 06
- Area code: +421-2
- Vehicle registration plate (until 2022): BA, BL, BT
- Website: zahorskabystrica.sk

Záhorská Bystrica (German: Bisternitz, Hungarian: Pozsonybeszterce) is a city borough of Bratislava, the capital of Slovakia. It is located in the northern part of the city, lying on the foothills of the Pezinok Carpathians, part of the Little Carpathians mountain range. It is part of the Bratislava IV administrative district. The city borough covers 32 kilometres squared and is home to approximately 7,386 inhabitants (April 2023). Záhorská Bystrica is a small borough at the outskirts of the city with preserved peasants' houses and more recent modern villas and estates.

Záhorská Bystrica features a baroque parish building, Roman Catholic Church of Saint Peter and Saint Paul from 1834, Chapel of Saint John of Nepomuk from 1896, Chapel of Saints Cosmas and Damian from 1839, Chapel of Virgin Mary of Lourdes from 1913 and Chapel of Saint Vendelin. The borough is home to Slovakia's major TV station, TV Markíza.

== Geography ==
The municipality lies at an altitude of 175 metres (574 ft) and covers an area of 32.29 km^{2} (12.47 sq mi) (2025).

== History ==
The first preserved written account of the settlement dates to 1208 under the name Bisztric. Croatian settlement here dates to 1520. The settlement became a part of Bratislava on 1 January 1972.

== Population ==
Population statistic (10 years)
Year	1995	2005	2015	2025
Count	1810	2492	4559	8009
Difference		+37.67%	+82.94%	+75.67%

Population statistic
Year	2024	2025
Count	7730	8009
Difference		+3.60%

It has a population of 8009 people (31 December 2025).

=== Ethnicity ===
Census 2021 (1+ %)
Ethnicity	Number	Fraction
Slovak	5909	90.33%
Not found out	447	6.83%
Czech	112	1.71%
Other	77	1.17%
Total	6541	

In year 2021 was 6541 people by ethnicity 5909 as Slovak, 447 as Not found out, 112 as Czech, 77 as Other, 63 as Hungarian, 33 as Rusyn, 28 as German, 22 as Russian, 17 as Polish, 12 as Ukrainian, 11 as Jewish, 11 as Moravian, 8 as French, 7 as Italian, 6 as Romanian, 6 as Austrian, 5 as Korean, 5 as Bulgarian, 4 as Turkish, 4 as Croatian, 3 as Romani, 3 as English, 3 as Albanian, 2 as Serbian, 1 as Vietnamese, 1 as Silesian, 1 as Canadian and 1 as Greek.

Note on population: The difference values of population numbers in the table "Population statistic" and in the sections "Ethnicity" & "Religion" is caused by the use of various statistical methods.

=== Religion ===
Census 2021 (1+ %)
Religion	Number	Fraction
Roman Catholic Church	2919	44.63%
None	2717	41.54%
Not found out	438	6.7%
Evangelical Church	164	2.51%
Greek Catholic Church	68	1.04%
Total	6541	

In year 2021 was 6541 people by religion 2919 from Roman Catholic Church, 2717 from None, 438 from Not found out, 164 from Evangelical Church, 68 from Greek Catholic Church, 39 from Eastern Orthodox Church, 36 from Other, 31 from Ad hoc movements, 24 from Other and not ascertained christian church, 20 from Buddhism, 16 from Calvinist Church, 14 from Jehovah's Witnesses, 8 from Jewish community, 8 from Christian Congregations in Slovakia, 5 from Islam, 5 from Church of the Brethren, 5 from Seventh-day Adventist Church, 5 from Church of Jesus Christ of Latter-day Saints, 4 from Paganism and natural spirituality, 3 from United Methodist Church, 3 from Czechoslovak Hussite Church, 3 from Apostolic Church, 2 from Hinduism, 2 from Baptists Church and 2 from Bahá'i Community.

== See also ==
- Boroughs and localities of Bratislava
