= Bratislava 4 =

Coordinates: 48.231717°N 17.050116°E

Bratislava IV District
- District
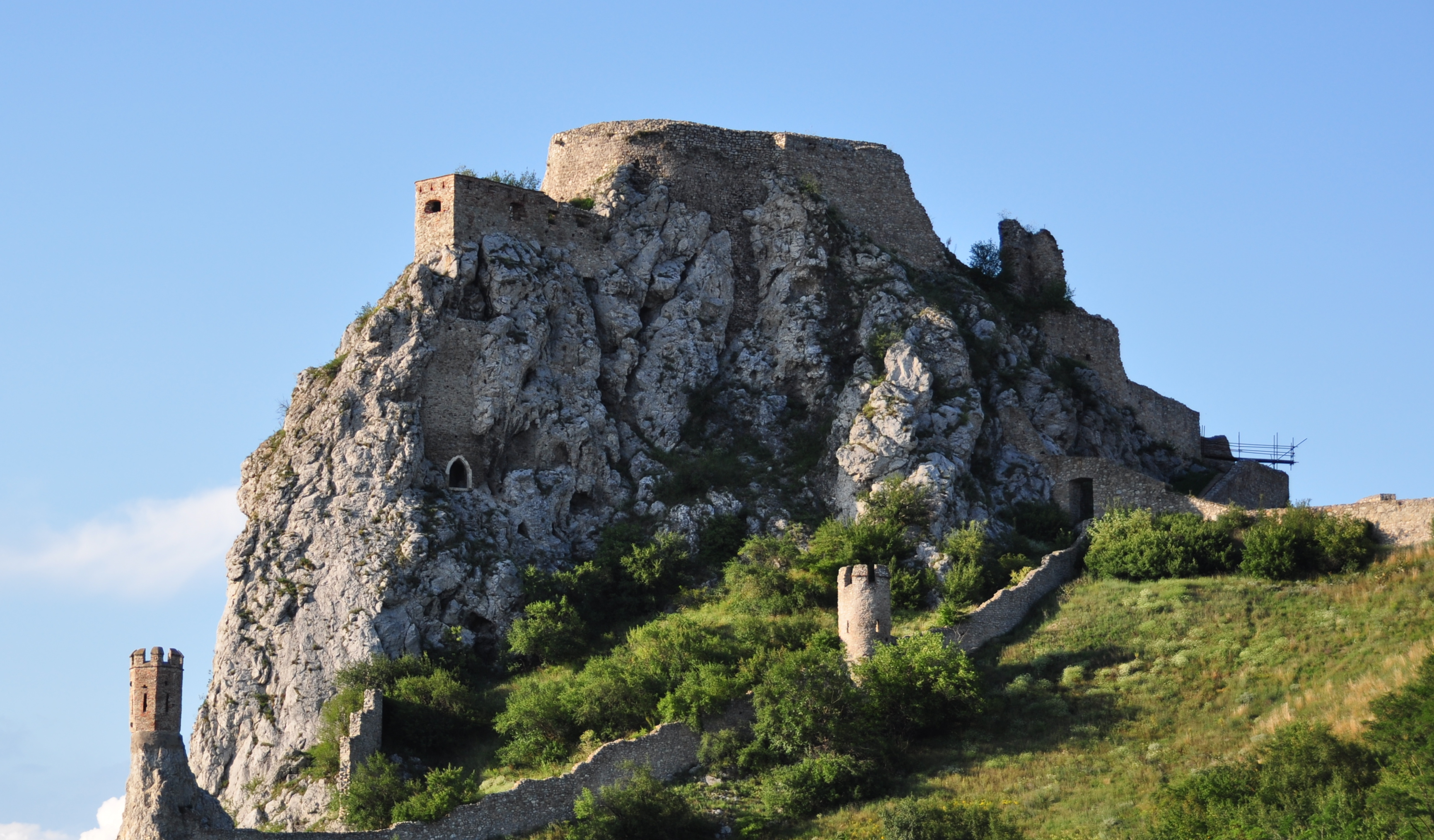
- Country: Slovakia
- Region (kraj): Bratislava Region
- Seat: Bratislava

Area
  - Total: 96.70 km^{2} (37.34 sq mi)

Population (2025)
  - Total: 105,236
- Time zone: UTC+1 (CET)
  - Summer (DST): UTC+2 (CEST)
- Telephone prefix: 02
- Vehicle registration plate (until 2022): BA, BL, BT, BD, BE, BI
- Boroughs: 6

Bratislava IV (Slovak: okres Bratislava IV; Hungarian: Pozsonyi IV. járás) is an okres (district) of Bratislava in the Bratislava Region of Slovakia. It is the largest Bratislava district and covers the north-western parts of Bratislava, including the boroughs of Devín, Devínska Nová Ves, Dúbravka, Karlova Ves, Lamač and Záhorská Bystrica.

It is bordered by the Morava River in the west (which also forms the border with Austria), Malacky District in the north, the Pezinok and Bratislava III districts in the east, Bratislava I district in the south-east, by a short part of Bratislava V district in the south and again by Austria along the Danube river.

== Population ==
Historical population
Year	Pop.	±%
1970	44,178	—
1980	75,606	+71.1%
1991	84,325	+11.5%
2001	93,058	+10.4%
2011	92,030	−1.1%
2021	105,245	+14.4%
Source: Censuses

Population statistic (10 years)
Year	1995	2005	2015	2025
Count	96,373	93,672	95,376	105,236
Difference		−2.80%	+1.81%	+10.33%

Population statistic
Year	2024	2025
Count	105,137	105,236
Difference		+0.09%

It has a population of 105,236 people (31 December 2025).

=== Ethnicity ===
Census 2021 (1+ %)
Ethnicity	Number	Fraction
Slovak	93,393	85.16%
Not found out	7974	7.27%
Hungarian	2131	1.94%
Czech	1891	1.72%
Total	109,667	

In year 2021 was 109,667 people by ethnicity 93,393 as Slovak, 7974 as Not found out, 2131 as Hungarian, 1891 as Czech, 1008 as Other, 479 as Rusyn, 412 as German, 385 as Russian, 346 as Ukrainian, 249 as Croatian, 189 as Bulgarian, 162 as Polish, 128 as Serbian, 117 as Italian, 114 as Romani, 107 as Moravian, 86 as Jewish, 74 as French, 70 as Romanian, 68 as Austrian, 49 as Albanian, 33 as Chinese, 33 as Turkish, 32 as Korean, 29 as Canadian, 28 as English, 24 as Vietnamese, 21 as Greek, 17 as Irish, 11 as Silesian and 7 as Iranian.

Note on population: The difference values of population numbers in the table "Population statistic" and in the sections "Ethnicity" & "Religion" is caused by the use of various statistical methods.

=== Religion ===
Census 2021 (1+ %)
Religion	Number	Fraction
None	45,853	43.57%
Roman Catholic Church	40,997	38.95%
Not found out	8486	8.06%
Evangelical Church	4305	4.09%
Greek Catholic Church	1187	1.13%
Total	105,245	

In year 2021 was 105,245 people by religion 45,853 from None, 40,997 from Roman Catholic Church, 8486 from Not found out, 4305 from Evangelical Church, 1187 from Greek Catholic Church, 645 from Ad hoc movements, 642 from Eastern Orthodox Church, 608 from Other, 400 from Other and not ascertained christian church, 302 from Calvinist Church, 276 from Buddhism, 270 from Christian Congregations in Slovakia, 232 from Jehovah's Witnesses, 180 from Islam, 161 from Church of the Brethren, 121 from Jewish community, 118 from Paganism and natural spirituality, 107 from Apostolic Church, 87 from Baptists Church, 72 from Seventh-day Adventist Church, 49 from United Methodist Church, 38 from Hinduism, 35 from Old Catholic Church, 31 from Czechoslovak Hussite Church, 21 from Church of Jesus Christ of Latter-day Saints, 21 from Bahá'i Community and 1 from New Apostolic Church.

== Boroughs ==
Borough	Area [km^{2}]	Population
Devín	13.96	2,165
Devínska Nová Ves	24.22	17,128
Dúbravka	8.62	35,300
Karlova Ves	10.94	34,746
Lamač	6.54	7,888
Záhorská Bystrica	32.29	8,009

Population and area values are current for year 2025.
