= Horny =

Horny most often refers to:

- Having horns or horn-like features
- "Horny/horniness", a slang term for sexual arousal

Horny may also refer to:

== Music ==
- "Horny" (Mark Morrison song), 1996
- "Horny" (OPM song), 2005
- "Horny '98", by Mousse T., 1998
- "Horny", by Pussy Riot from Matriarchy Now

== Surname ==
- Franz Horny (1798–1824), German painter
- Jo Horny (born 1938), Belgian boxer
- Katherine Horny (born 1969), Peruvian volleyball player
- Konrad Horny (1764–1807), German artist
- Štefan Horný (born 1957), Slovak football manager

== Fictional characters ==
- Horny, in the game The Adventures of Willy Beamish
- Horny, monster from Dungeon Keeper
- Horny the Clown, the antagonist of Drive-Thru

== Places ==
=== Slovakia ===
==== Villages ====
- Horný Badín
- Horný Bar
- Horný Hričov
- Horný Kalník
- Horný Lieskov
- Horný Pial
- Horný Tisovník
- Horný Vadičov
- Horný Vék

==== Other ====
- Horný les, nature preserve

=== Other countries ===
- Horní Police, village in Czech Republic

== Nature and science ==
- Octocorallia, also known as "horny coral"
- Earwig, also known as "horny gollach", insects
- Epimedium, also known as "horny goat weed", plant
- Horned lizard, also known as "horny toad"
- Isopogon ceratophyllus, also known as "horny cone-bushes", plant
- Keratosa, also known as "horny sponges", subclass of demosponges
- Plate (anatomy), also known as "horny plates"
- Stratum corneum (Latin for "horny layer"), epidermic layer of skin

== See also ==
- Horney, a surname
