= Vék =

Vék may refer to:

- Dolný Vék, Slovakia
- Horný Vék, Slovakia
