= Vek =

Vek may refer to:

- Tom Vek (born 1981), English musician
- F. L. Věk, a 1906 Czech novel
- Dolný Vék, Slovakia
- Horný Vék, Slovakia
