= Lamač Gate =

Coordinates: 48.1749°N 17.0644°E

Distant view of the Lamač Gate

Lamač Gate (Slovak: Lamačská brána) is a tectonic erosion subsidence in Bratislava, the capital of Slovakia. It is one out of four geomorphological areas of the Devín Carpathians, part of the Little Carpathians mountain range, separating Devín Carpathians from the central massif of Little Carpathians. The city borough of Lamač and parts of Dúbravka lie geographically within the Lamač Gate.

== Location and description ==
Lamač Gate is located in the north-western part of Bratislava to the east of the Devín Gate. Both gates are predisposed tectonic erosion subsidences where parts of the city of Bratislava are located. Lamač Gate forms the continuation of the Záhorie Lowland but it does not connect all the way to the Danubian Lowland. It consists of the mouth of the gate close to the Záhorie Lowland, central part (called the Lamač-Dúbravka part) is the largest and highest part of the gate, it then significantly narrows down between the massifs of Kamzík and Staré Grunty until it finally widens again in the area of the Red Bridge valley at Patrónka. The gate ends at today's Brnianska Street at the top of the hill at the watershed near the Bratislava Kalvária.

The area is densely populated and contains major transport infrastructure including the D2 motorway, I/2 road, the railway line no. 110 Bratislava – Kúty – Břeclav and railway line no. 100 Bratislava – Devínska Nová Ves – Marchegg. There are two railway stations in the area: Bratislava Železná studienka railway station and Bratislava Lamač railway station.

The last paleostress brittle-fault related event represents NNE-SSW tension, which is responsible for creation of the Upper Miocene Lamač Gate depression along NW-SE normal faults. These are the youngest faults in the structural plan of the southern rim of Bratislava massif, even suspected form neotectonic activity.

== See also ==
- Geography of Bratislava
- Little Carpathians
- Lamač
