= Bratislava railway station =

Bratislava railway station may refer to several stations in Slovakia:

- Bratislava main railway station, on the edge of Old Town
- Bratislava-Petržalka railway station, a terminal station for trains from Austria, located in Petržalka
- Bratislava Lamač railway station, a halt in the Lamač borough of Bratislava
- Bratislava Železná studienka railway station, a halt in the Bratislava Forest Park
