= Feminine psychology =

Approach that counters Freud's view

Feminine psychology or the psychology of women is an approach that focuses on social, economic, and political issues confronting women all throughout their lives. It emerged after early psychoanalytic debates between Sigmund Freud and Karen Horney. The original work of Karen Horney argued that male realities could not accurately describe female psychology or define their gender because they were not informed by girls' or women's experiences. Theorists, like Horney, argued that women's social existence was crucial in understanding women's psychology. Carol Gilligan's work on moral development added to feminine psychology discussions of moral reasoning through her concept of "ethics of care." Dr. Carol Gilligan's research suggests that some characteristics of female psychology emerge to comply with the given social order instead of the nature of their gender or psychology.

== Horney's theory ==
The "feminine psychology" approach is often attributed to the pioneering work of Karen Horney, a psychologist from the late 19th century. During her career, she wrote fourteen papers on feminine psychology. These papers offered a then-prevalent psychoanalytical view of female development during the feminine movement in the late 1960s. Horney questioned Sigmund Freud's psychoanalytic theory, arguing that it was centered around the male gender, therefore, harbored biases and phallocentric views. Horney suggested that for this reason, Freud's theory could not describe femininity because it prioritized the male centered assumptions and did not take into account the actual female experience. An example of this is Freud's proposition that the female personality tends to exhibit penis envy, whereby a girl interprets her lack of a penis as a punishment and later blames her mother. As Freud stated, "She has seen it and knows that she is without it and wants to have it." Horney argued Frued's proposition overlooked factors such as basic anxiety, hostility, and anger towards the opposite-sex parent, whom she views as competition for the affection of the same-sex parent, and thus views her as a direct threat to her safety and security. As part of her feminine psychology theory, Horney proposed that that aspect should be resolved based on interpersonal dynamics (e.g. differences in social power) rather than sexual dynamics.

Horney countered the Freudian concept: she deconstructed penis envy and suggested it was women wanting to express their own natural needs for success and the security, which is a shared characteristic of both sexes. She ultimately understood penis envy as a product of three components related to a lack of gratification (i.e. of natural needs and security) rather than a woman's attachment to her father. From this understanding, Horney believed that when such gratifications are lacking it leads to a resentment of the feminine role and an impairment of the feminine development. There is an analogy that describes Horney's feminine psychology as optimistic of the world and life affirmation in comparison with Freud's pessimism oriented towards world and life negation. In deconstructing the Freudian concept of penis envy, Horney countered it with the concept of womb envy which suggest that men might experience envy of women's biological functions. Horney also argued that there are societal and cultural explanations for the differences between men and women, which disagreed with Freud’s beliefs that it was biology that made men and women differ.

In addition to her fourteen papers, Horney wrote a book titled The Flight from Womanhood which explores the evolution of women, masculine versus feminine complexes, and the impact of perceived inferiority of femininity. In the book she states that the evolution of women is distorted by the application of a masculine criteria. Additionally, she claims women develop a masculine complex to combat disadvantages faced in their social life such as being claimed as inferior. According to Horney, as such, women develop a contempt for femininity, and their feminine identity becomes threatened as any emerging feminine traits in identity will make them feel more inferior.

== Influential Figures in Feminine Psychology ==
Before feminine psychology's initial development with Horney's work in the late 19th century, early studies on women's psyches focused primarily on sex differences as a means of perpetuating women's predetermined social roles. Then emerging in the late 1800s into the early 1900s, early female psychologists made significant impacts on the field of psychology which would later contribute to the subfield of feminine psychology. Primarily in response to the experiences of sexism and widespread sexist assumptions about women, these women helped pave the way for the development of a more legitimate field of the psychology of women. As such, the growth of the field is aligned closely with the historical trajectory of women's social status and the increasing societal awareness of gendered practices. As the field developed methodologically, epistemologically, and even politically, studies on women and gender became increasingly more diverse.

In 1895, Mary Whiton Calkins and Cordelia Nevers conducted a study that challenged the belief in the variability hypothesis. The variability hypothesis, or the belief that men exhibit greater range and variability in the distribution of psychological traits than do women, was previously a prominent concept in early psychology. In addition to Calkins and Nevers, there were other important women psychologists studying female psychology during the late 1800s and early 1900s such as Leta Stetter Hollingworth, Beth Lucy Wellman, and Georgene Hoffman Seward. In 1900, Helene Thompson Woolley was the first woman to write a dissertation in psychology on sex differences and not long after in the early 1900s Helen Deutsch became the second woman analyst to write on female psychology.

Alongside Karen Horney, Clara Thompson was another important female psychologist during the 1920s up until the 1970s. Then in the 1970s, Sandra Blem created the Blem Sex Role Inventory (BSRI) which categorizes people as either masculine, feminine, androgynous, or undifferentiated. The BSRI laid the groundwork for a new understanding of gender in psychology which viewed psychological gender as accounting for individual differences in human behavior and as independent of the biological sex of an individual. Later in the late 90s, Barbara Fredrickson and Tomi-Ann Roberts developed a framework for understanding how women's socialization and experiences of sexual objectification are translated into mental health problems, also known as objectification theory. Overall, due to the collective efforts of female psychologists throughout the 20th century femininity became less criticized, but themes of gender dualism were still deeply embedded in psychology, and definitions and evaluations of the feminine psyche were still heavily disputed.

== Motherhood vs. career ==
One dynamic outlined by feminine psychologists is the relationship between traditional roles of motherhood and the more modern role of a career woman. The roles do not necessarily contradict each other: additional income helps provide for the family and working mothers may feel as though they are making a contribution to society beyond the family.

Both mothers and fathers feel the pressure of balancing both work and family life, and research suggests that fathers spend more time at home and engage in childcare and housework more than they did a century ago. A study conducted by the Pew Research Center found that 42% of respondents considered a mother who works part-time as an ideal scenario, while 16% preferred that working full-time is an ideal scenario for mothers, and others preferred that mothers stay at home. 46% of fathers also reported that they felt they were not spending enough time with their children: fathers who responded to this Pew research survey were spending about half as much time providing childcare as the mothers. 15% of working fathers stated that it is very difficult to balance work and take care of their children. The same study found that 50% of working fathers say that it is at least somewhat difficult to balance work and childcare responsibilities. However, fathers who are able to assist in childcare report that they like doing so, often even more so than mothers. The Pew Research Center also asked parents to rate how good of a job they are doing as parents. It was found that most mothers and women rated themselves as doing an excellent or very good job, but that working mothers rated themselves a lot higher than non-working mothers did despite the fact that parents who felt they spent too little time with their children were less likely to rate themselves as doing an excellent job. The Pew Research Center has taken on several studies and surveys in order to research and investigate the differences associated with feminine psychology and the people’s views on the progression of women in the workplace and their place in the home.

According to a study conducted by Jennifer Stuart, A woman's past may influence how, or if, she chooses to balance her work and home lives. Specifically, Stuart asserts that the primary determinant is a woman's "quality of her relationship with her mother. She suggests that women whose mothers fostered feelings of both warm attachment and confident autonomy may find ways to enjoy their children and/or work, often modifying work and family environments in ways that favor both". A similar concept to Stuart's is Mary Esther Harding and Carl Jung's idea of father-fixations in father-daughter relationships. Harding and Jung proposed that when women's early development revolves around a father figure, opposed to a mother figure, they experience issues with their psyches later in life such as shifts away from their innate psychic pattern, personality traits being developed on foreign ground, and problems with sexual instinct development.

Working women sometimes adjust their careers so that they can balance paid work and motherhood responsibilities. These adjustments include cutting back hours and accepting lower pay or lower job status.

Dr. Ramon Resa suggests that mothers remember that "children are fairly resilient and will adapt to whatever changes are required. They are also astute at sensing unhappiness, disappointment, and apathy".

== Experiences of Sexual Harassment and Objectification ==
One common experience in women's social lives which at times impacts their psyches and mental health is sexual harassment and sexual objectification. A study conducted by the University of Auckland's psychology department examined the effects that experiences of sexual harassment have on women's well-being. The researchers used data from the New Zealand Attitudes and Values Study (NZAVS) to measure life events and assess experiences of sexual harassment, and the Broad Inventory of Specific Life Events to assess sexual harassment. They used data from 611 women and found that women who reported sexual harassment had lower levels of well-being, lower life satisfaction, and greater psychological distress. Additionally, they found that women who reported sexual harassment experienced reductions in their perceptions of gender relations, showing reduced support for the gender hierarchy and general status quo.

Fredrickson and Roberts (1997) developed the objectification theory which highlights how women's experiences of sexual objectification often translate into mental health problems. Objectification theory is an integrative framework for understanding how women's socialization and experiences of sexual objectification can be tied to mental health problems such as eating disorders, depression, and sexual dysfunction. The framework of objectification theory states that for women, gender role socialization and sexual objectification experiences promote self-objectification which can then lead to body shame and anxiety, and reduced awareness of internal bodily states. According to Fredrickson and Roberts, self-objectification is a consequence of being socialized to treat oneself as an object and evaluate oneself based on bodily appearance. Research has shown that women of various races and sexualities report similar levels of sexual objectification experiences, self-objectification, and body shame. Several studies have also highlighted how heightened self-objectification can impact performance outcomes on tasks that require concentration and flow.

== See also ==
- Analytical psychology
- Feminization (sociology)

== Sources ==
- Brinjikji, Hiam. (1999). Property Rights of Women in Nineteenth Century England. Unpublished manuscript, Department of English, University of Maryland, College Park, M.D. Retrieved from: http://www.umd.umich.edu/casl/hum/eng/classes/434/geweb/PROPERTY.htmhttp://webspace.ship.edu/cgboer/horney.html
- Engler, Barbara. (2009). Personality Theories. 8th Ed. Houghton Mifflin Harcourt, Print.
- Horney & Humanistic Psychoanalysis: Major Concepts. International Karen Horney Society. N.p., 18JUN2002. Web. 21 October 2010. Retrieved from: https://web.archive.org/web/20110523100527/http://plaza.ufl.edu/bjparis/horney/fadiman/04_major.html
- Perron, Roger. Inferiority, Feeling of. Encyclopedia.com. N.p., 2005. Web. 21 October 2010. Retrieved from: http://www.encyclopedia.com/doc/1G2-3435300700.html.
- Lambert, Tim. (n.d.). 16th Century Women. Retrieved from http://www.localhistories.org/women.html
- Lowe, Maggie. (1989). Early College Women: Determined to be Educated. Unpublished manuscript, Department of History, State University of New York, Potsdam, NY. Retrieved from: https://web.archive.org/web/20101207145451/http://www.northnet.org/stlawrenceaauw/college.htm
- The Woman Suffrage Timeline. (2007). Retrieved from: http://www.thelizlibrary.org/suffrage/
- Women in the Senate. (n.d.). Retrieved from: https://www.senate.gov/artandhistory/history/common/briefing/women_senators.htm
- Horney, K. (1967). The Flight from Womanhood: The masculinity-complex in women as viewed by men and by women. In H. Kelman (Ed.) Feminine psychology. New York: Norton
- Schultz, D., Schultz, S. (2009). Theories of Personality (9th Ed.) New York: Wadsworth, Cengage Learning
- Hansen, R., Hansen, J., Pollycove, R. (2002). Mother nurture: a mother’s guide to health in body, mind and intimate relationships. New York: Viking Penguin.
- Kapur, M. (5 August 2005). Balancing motherhood and a career. CNN.com International. Retrieved from: http://edition.cnn.com/2004/BUSINESS/08/04/maternity.leave/index.html
- Resa, R. (8 December 2009). Give up a career or give up motherhood. The Huffington Post. Retrieved from: http://www.huffingtonpost.com/ramon-resa-md/give-up-a-career-or-give_b_383645.html
- Parker, Kim. "Modern Parenthood." Pew Research Center's Social Demographic Trends Project RSS. Social and Demographic Trends, 13 March 2013. Web. 15 February 2016. Retrieved from: http://www.pewsocialtrends.org/2013/03/14/modern-parenthood-roles-of-moms-and-dads-converge-as-they-balance-work-and-family/
- Livingston, Gretchen. “For most highly educated women, motherhood doesn’t start until the 30s.” Pew Research Center’s Social Demographic Trends Project RSS. Social and Demographic Trends, 15 January 2015. Web. 15 February 2016. Retrieved from: http://www.pewresearch.org/fact-tank/2015/01/15/for-most-highly-educated-women-motherhood-doesnt-start-until-the-30s/
- Jorge M. Agüero and Mindy S. Marks, “Motherhood and Female Labor Force Participation: Evidence from Infertility Shocks,” The American Economic Review 98, no. 2 (2008): 500–504.
