= Devínska Nová Ves railway station =

Railway station in Bratislava, Slovakia

Bratislava - Devínska Nová Ves
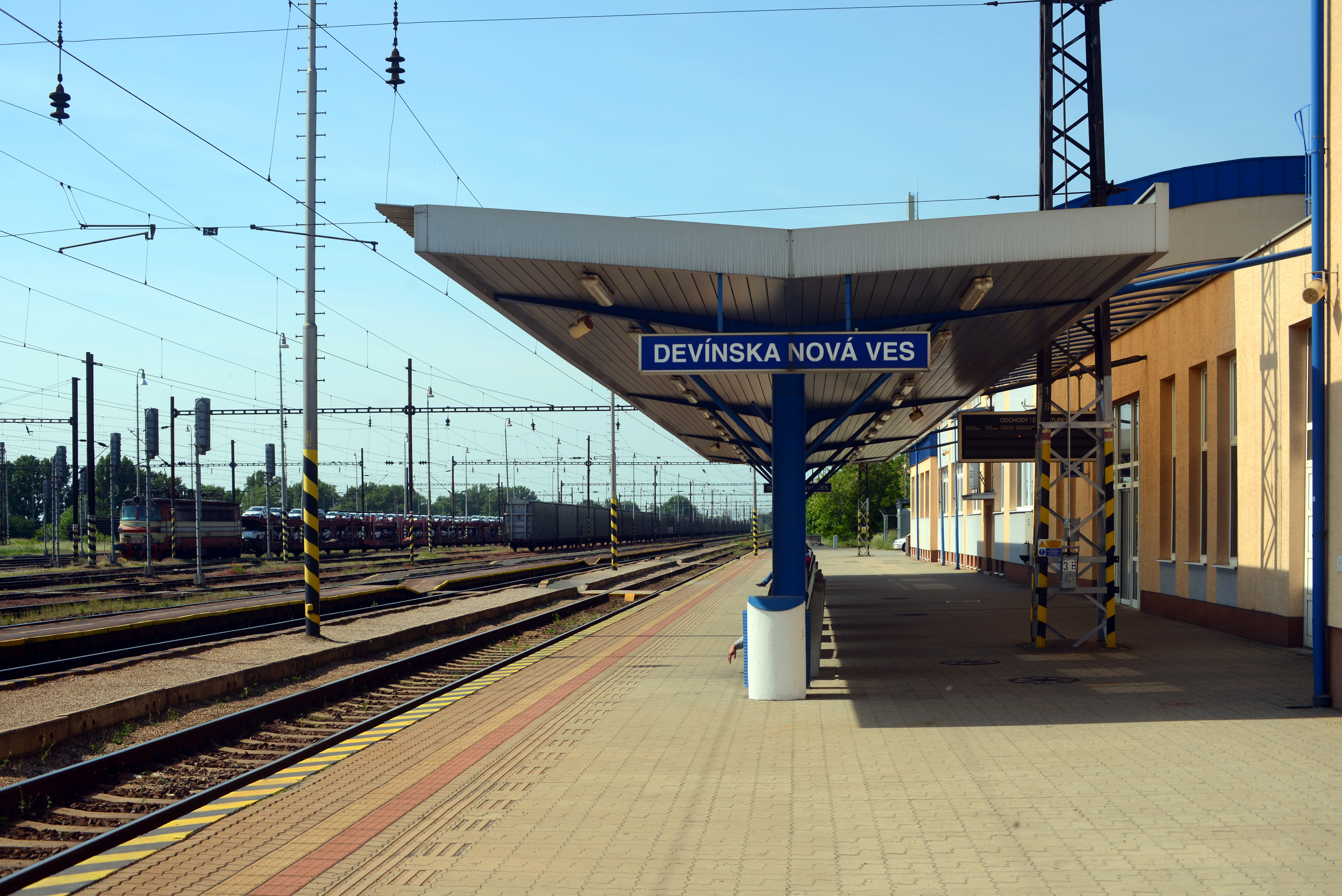
- Bratislava – Devínska Nová Ves railway station

General information
- Location: Slovakia
- Coordinates: 48°13′09″N 16°58′36″E
- Owner: Železnice Slovenskej republiky (ŽSR)
- Operator: Železnice Slovenskej republiky (ŽSR)
- Line: Bratislava–Kúty
- Distance: 49.147 km (30.539 mi) from Kúty
- Connections: Public transport buses stop next to the railway station
Location

Bratislava Devínska Nová Ves railway station is a small train station inside the Devínska Nová Ves borough of Bratislava, Slovakia. It is located on line number 110 from Bratislava hlavná stanica to Kúty and Břeclav. The line to Marchegg, Austria, branches off from it. The line is part of the EU-backed Baltic–Adriatic Corridor. The station buildings are located on the right in the direction from Bratislava. The station facility has 15 traffic railway tracks, 8 siding tracks, and two other tracks.

== History ==
The first "non-animal" railway line in the territory of present-day Slovakia passed through Devínska Nová Ves station. On August 20, 1848, the first steam train hauled by the engine "BIHAR" arrived from Vienna, Austria, via Gänserndorf, Marchegg, and Devínska Nová Ves to Bratislava.

After the construction of the Bratislava–Vác section, the line connected Vienna and Budapest starting in 1850 and was among the most important train lines in Austria-Hungary. The original Orient Express also ran along this route.

In 1891, the line passing through Devínska Nová Ves and Kúty to Skalica was put into operation. A branch line to the Volkswagen Slovakia automobile factory also originates from Devínska Nová Ves. Before World War I, a 4 km long narrow-gauge railway ran along the Morava River here to haul gravel and sand.

After World War I, a second track was built along the entire section, and in 1967, the line became the first in Slovakia to be electrified with a 25 kV, 50 Hz power system.

In 2010s, the Slovak Railways planned to electrify the line on the Devínska Nová Ves–Marchegg section as part of a Slovak-Austrian project. After modernization, trains were supposed to be able to travel here at speeds of up to 120 km/h and the journey to Vienna was supposed to take 40 minutes.

== See also ==
- Transport in Bratislava

Preceding station		Following station
Bratislava Lamač railway station	ŽSR No. 110 Bratislava–Kúty–Břeclav	Devínske jazero railway station
