= Záhorie Protected Landscape Area =

Protected landscape area of Slovakia

Záhorie Protected Landscape Area CHKO Záhorie
- IUCN category V (protected landscape/seascape)
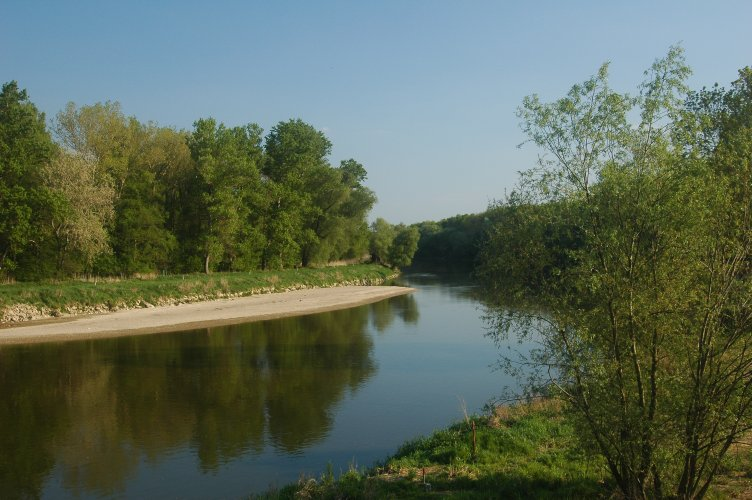
- The Morava River between Slovakia and Austria
- Interactive map of Záhorie Protected Landscape Area; CHKO Záhorie
- Location: West Slovakia, Záhorie
- Coordinates: 48°26′N 16°58′E
- Area: 275.22 km^{2} (106.26 sq mi)
- Established: 9 November 1988
- Governing body: Správa CHKO Záhorie (CHKO Záhorie Administration) in Malacky

Záhorie Protected Landscape Area (Slovak: Chránená krajinná oblasť Záhorie) is the first lowland protected landscape area in Slovakia. It is located in the non-administrative Záhorie Region in West Slovakia. The Landscape Area protects 275.22 km² (106.26 mi²) and is divided into two separate parts – western and north-eastern. The western part starts near the village of Kúty in the north, follows the borders between Slovakia and Austria alongside the Morava River and ends near Stupava in the south. The north-eastern part is bordered by the Military District of Záhorie in the east and south.

== Geography, geology and ecology ==
The western part of the Landscape Area is formed by the Morava River and mainly consists of vast riparian zones and floodplains. This area is well preserved because it had been a strictly prohibited border between the Eastern Bloc and the Western Bloc for 40 years, known as the Iron Curtain. The area contains the largest water-meadows in Slovakia. The riparian forests, mainly in Horný les and Dolný les, contain trees similar to the original old growth forests. A vast network of channels, wetlands and small lakes is spread in the riparian zones and floodplains. These rich and dynamic geographical features bring an extensive variety of flora and fauna. Plants are represented by, for example, large areas of Clematis integrifolia. The water habitat is dominantly occupied by animal groups such as crustaceans, molluscs, fish, amphibians and a lot of species of aquatic birds. The European beaver returned to this area from Austria, where it was reintroduced in the 1980s.

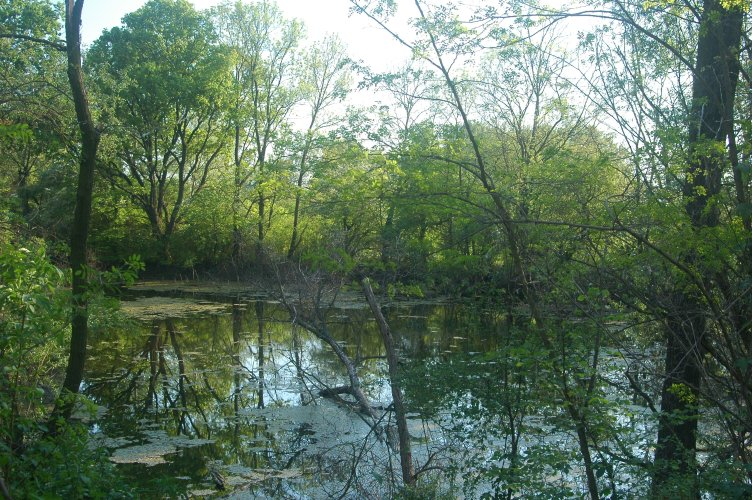
Wetlands alongside the Morava River

The north-eastern part contains sand deposited by aeolian processes, which create dunes. Because of its location, this area is an important route for migrating birds. The contrast between colder lower areas and warm sand dunes creates a bright variety of species. The warm and dry areas are home to the antlion and hoopoe. The fir forests are home to insect predators, which serve as a feeding ground for the European nightjar, woodlark and bats.

== Tourism ==
In the western part, the artificial levee alongside the Morava River and adjacent newly built biking trail contains boards and posters informing about wildlife and is also popular with hikers. The north-eastern part contains biking and hiking trails, offering unique sand dunes. Biking trails are interconnected with others outside the Landscape Area.

== See also ==
Protected areas of Slovakia
