= Horný les =

National nature reserve, Slovakia

Coordinates: 48.353579°N 16.867947°E

- Interactive map of Horný les
- Area: 5.43 km²
- Established: 1981

Horný les is a national nature reserve in the Slovak municipality of Vysoká pri Morave in the Malacky District. The nature reserve covers an area of 543 ha of the Morava floodplains. It has a protection level of 4 under the Slovak nature protection system and is part of the Natura 2000 network. The nature reserve is part of the Záhorie Protected Landscape Area. Together with the Austrian Marchauen reserve managed by World Wide Fund for Nature and the national nature reserve Dolný les, which extends toward the south, it forms one of the largest continuous complexes of floodplain forests in Pomoravia.

== Description ==
The protected area was declared in 1981 for the protection of a complex of floodplain forests. The reserves hold stands of Pannonian hardwood floodplain forest with oak, elm and ash. Also, water and swamp species of plants and animals, especially waterfowl can be found here.
