= Horney =

Horney is a surname. Notable people with the surname include:

- Amanda Horney (1857–1953), Swedish politician
- Brigitte Horney (1911–1988), German actress
- Jane Horney (1918–1945), Swedish woman, believed to have spied in Denmark for the benefit of Nazi Germany
- Karen Horney (1885–1952), German psychoanalyst
- Marianne Horney Eckardt (1913–2018), German-born American psychoanalyst, translator and editor
- Odus Creamer Horney (1866–1957), American officer

== See also ==
- City of Norwood v. Horney
- Horney Bluff, Antarctica
- Horney Dicks, a nickname for the Londonderry Borough Police
- Horney Robinson House, Indiana, United States
- Horny (disambiguation)
- Lake Horney, Florida, United States
