= Chapel of Saint Rosalia =

Church in Bratislava, Slovakia

Chapel of Saint Rosalia Rímskokatolícka kaplnka sv. Rozálie
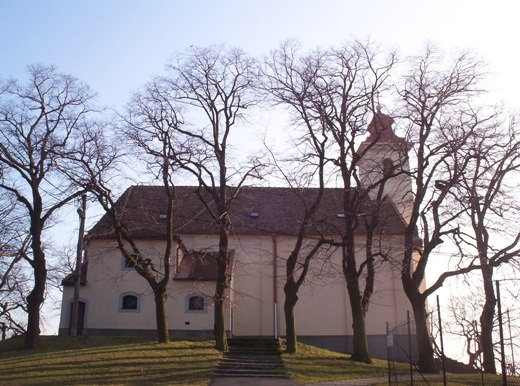
- Chapel of Saint Rosalia in Bratislava viewed from the north

Religion
- Affiliation: Roman-Catholic
- Ecclesiastical or organizational status: Church

Location
- Location: Lamač borough of Bratislava, Slovakia
- Interactive map of Chapel of Saint Rosalia; Rímskokatolícka kaplnka sv. Rozálie
- Coordinates: 48°11′20″N 17°02′59″E

Architecture
- Completed: 1682

Chapel of Saint Rosalia (Slovak: Rímskokatolícka kaplnka sv. Rozálie) is an early baroque church in the Lamač borough of Bratislava, the capital of Slovakia, built at the end of the 17th century. It is a Slovak national cultural landmark, protected since 1963 for retaining its historical value and being a testament of the urbanistic and architectonic features of historical Lamač. It is named after Saint Rosalia and it is owned by the city of Bratislava.

== Geography ==
The building is situated in Lamač, a borough of Bratislava, the capital of Slovakia.

== History ==
The people of Bratislava built the chapel out of gratitude for the end of an outbreak of plague in the years 1678–1679 which had a toll of 12,000 dead. It was built in the years 1680–1682 by the city of Bratislava and the construction was financed from public donations of citizens. Since its completion until today it has had no renovations, only the repairs occasioned by use and time with the last major repairs in the years 1974–1975. The main cross was replaced after being struck by lightning at the beginning of the 20th century.

A tradition evolved over time when each year on Saint Rosalia day on September 4, there used to be pilgrimages to this chapel. This tradition disappeared during World War II. Today, there are local festivities (Slovak: hody) at this day and there is a special mass celebrated in the chapel.

In 2017, the Slovak Roman Catholic Church started negotiations with the city of Bratislava to buy and reconstruct the chapel. On March 7, 2017, the local council of the borough of Lamač obliged the Mayor of Lamač to negotiate with the city the transfer of ownership of the chapel from the city to the city borough in case the negotiations between the city and the Roman Catholic Church should fail.

== Patron of the chapel ==
The chapel is sacred to Saint Rosalia, the patron against plague. She was born to a wealthy family. As an adult, she left her family's home and lived as a wandering mendicant. Rosalia died on September 4, 1160. She became the symbol fight against indulgence, regarded as an ideal of self-control. She is often depicted as a sleeping lady in a cave with a lot of colorful and flourishing roses around her.

== Gallery ==
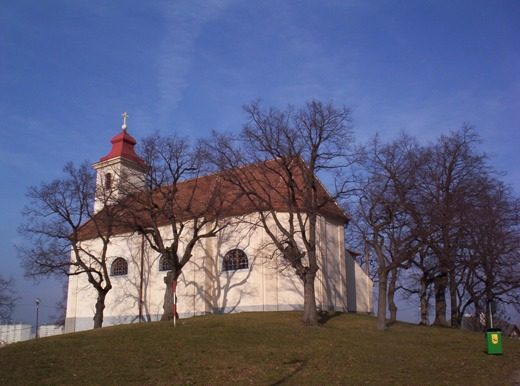
View from South

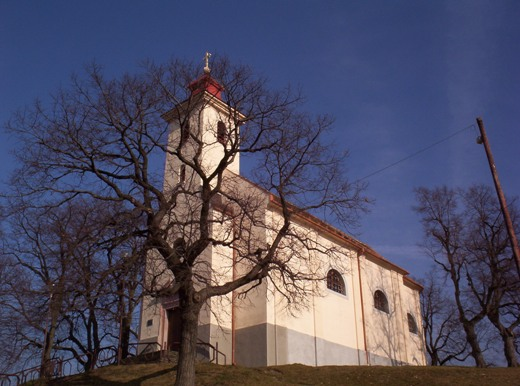
View from West

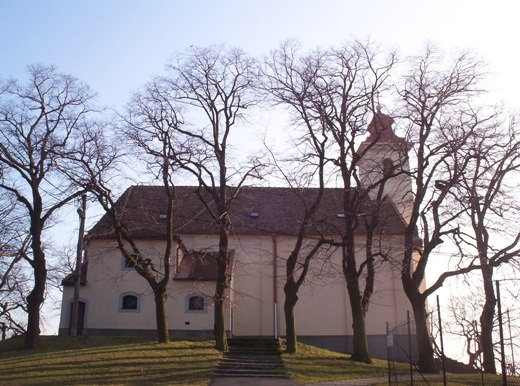
View from North

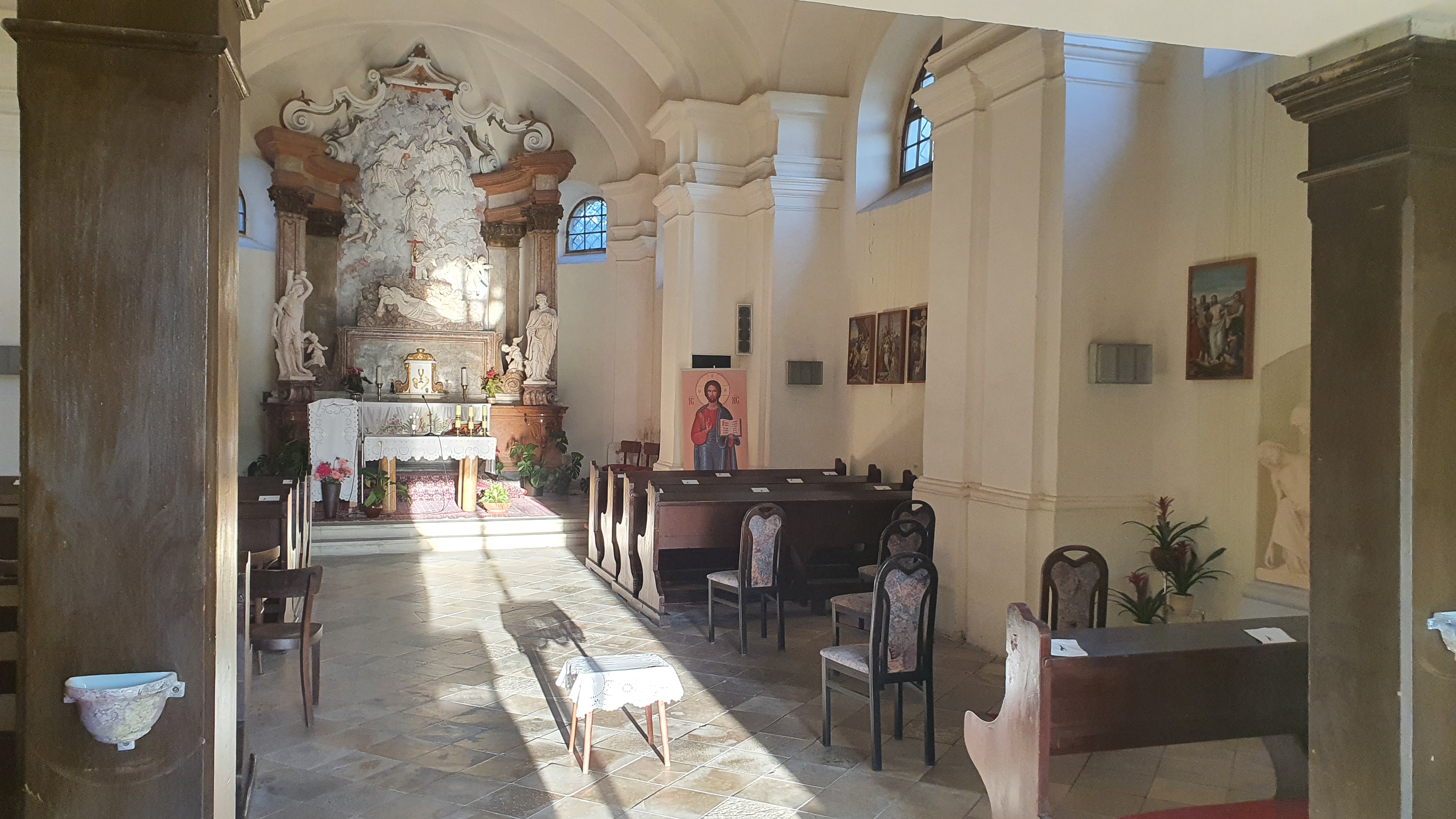
Interior

== Sources ==
- Húščava, A., 1998: Dejiny Lamača, INKA Bratislava
- Sopušková, A., Trebatický, A., 1996: Svätci bratislavských chrámov, domov a námestí, BIS Bratislava
