= Dolný les =

National nature reserve in Slovakia

Coordinates: 48.298733°N 16.908945°E

- Interactive map of Dolný les
- Area: 1.8626 km²
- Established: 1981

Dolný les is a national nature reserve in the Slovak municipality of Vysoká pri Morave in the Malacky District. The nature reserve covers an area of 186.26 ha of the Borská lowland area. It has a protection level of 4 under the slovak nature protection system. The nature reserve is part of the Záhorie Protected Landscape Area.

== Description ==
The Dolný les nature reserve was declared in 1981 by the ministry of culture of the Slovak Socialist Republic. It consists of 3 parts with the largest part in the north and 2 smaller parts around 300m more to the south, separated from each other and the main part by meadows. The protected area was declared for the protection of regularly inundated soft-wood floodplain forest with willows, poplars, sporadic plants and typical animal species.

== Fauna ==
Birds living in the nature reserve include the black-headed gull, the great reed warbler and the grey heron.
