= Lamač =

- Borough
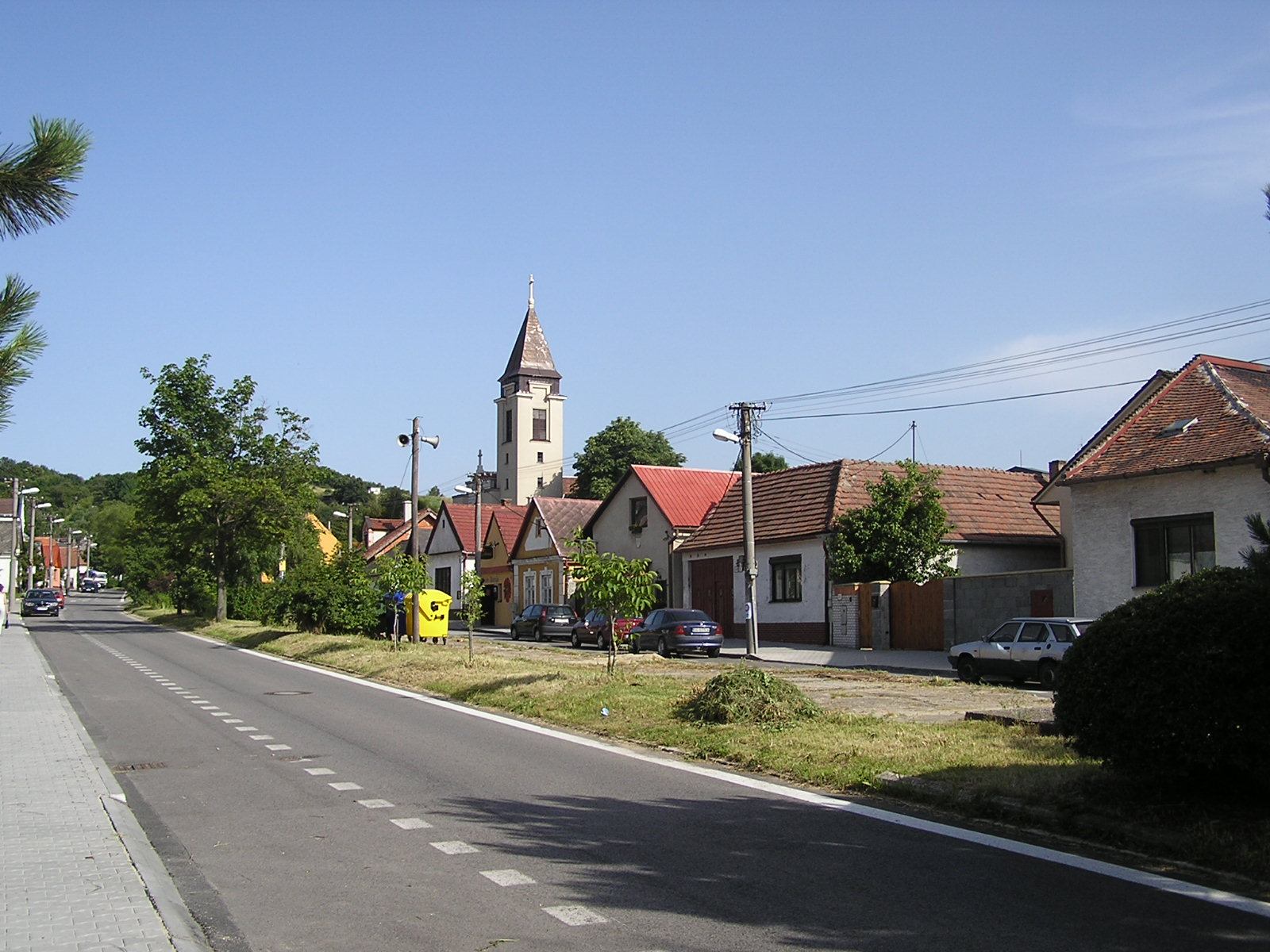
- Old Lamač

- Coat of arms

- Area of Lamač in Bratislava

- Location of Lamač in Slovakia
- Coordinates: 48°08′00″N 17°07′00″E
- Country: Slovakia
- Region: Bratislava Region
- District: Bratislava IV
- First mentioned: 1547 (Julian)

Government
  - Mayor: Igor Polakovič

Area
  - Total: 6.54 km^{2} (2.53 sq mi)
- Elevation: 220 m (720 ft)

Population (2025)
  - Total: 7,888
- Time zone: UTC+1 (CET)
  - Summer (DST): UTC+2 (CEST)
- Postal code: 841 03
- Area code: +421-2
- Vehicle registration plate (until 2022): BA, BL, BT
- Website: www.lamac.sk

Lamač (German: Blumenau; Hungarian: Lamacs) is the smallest borough of Bratislava, the capital of Slovakia, lying in the northern part of the city. Part of the Bratislava IV district, Lamač is home to approximately 7,000 inhabitants. Until 1946, Lamač was a small independent village, but it was incorporated into the city Bratislava. In the past, Lamač was known for its vineyards and as an agricultural and fruit supplier for Bratislava's markets.

The dominant features of Lamač include the Church of Saint Margita, the Chapel of Saint Rozalia and the Memorial to soldiers killed in The First World War. Lamač is accessible by the public transport system of Bratislava. The borough also features the Bratislava Lamač railway station.

== Location ==
Lamač borders Dúbravka to the south-west, Devínska Nová Ves to the west, Záhorská Bystrica to the north and Rača to the east, separated by the Pezinok Carpathians.

=== Division ===
Lamač is unofficially divided into two local parts: Rázsochy and Podháj.

== Geography ==
The municipality lies at an altitude of 220 metres (720 ft) and covers an area of 6.54 km^{2} (2.53 sq mi) (2025).

== Population ==
Population statistic (10 years)
Year	1995	2005	2015	2025
Count	7243	6447	7110	7888
Difference		−10.98%	+10.28%	+10.94%

Population statistic
Year	2024	2025
Count	7878	7888
Difference		+0.12%

It has a population of 7888 people (31 December 2025).

=== Ethnicity ===
Census 2021 (1+ %)
Ethnicity	Number	Fraction
Slovak	6974	89.53%
Not found out	554	7.11%
Hungarian	154	1.97%
Czech	134	1.72%
Total	7789	

In year 2021 was 7789 people by ethnicity 6974 as Slovak, 554 as Not found out, 154 as Hungarian, 134 as Czech, 56 as Other, 35 as German, 29 as Rusyn, 23 as Ukrainian, 19 as Russian, 15 as Italian, 15 as Polish, 15 as Moravian, 14 as Romanian, 12 as Serbian, 7 as Jewish, 5 as Canadian, 5 as English, 4 as Silesian, 4 as Romani, 4 as French, 4 as Croatian, 4 as Bulgarian, 3 as Austrian, 2 as Korean, 2 as Greek and 1 as Irish.

Note on population: The difference values of population numbers in the table "Population statistic" and in the sections "Ethnicity" & "Religion" is caused by the use of various statistical methods.

=== Religion ===
Census 2021 (1+ %)
Religion	Number	Fraction
Roman Catholic Church	3441	44.18%
None	2933	37.66%
Not found out	586	7.52%
Evangelical Church	407	5.23%
Greek Catholic Church	107	1.37%
Total	7789	

In year 2021 was 7789 people by religion 3441 from Roman Catholic Church, 2933 from None, 586 from Not found out, 407 from Evangelical Church, 107 from Greek Catholic Church, 44 from Eastern Orthodox Church, 42 from Church of the Brethren, 41 from Other and not ascertained christian church, 40 from Other, 40 from Ad hoc movements, 23 from Calvinist Church, 17 from Buddhism, 15 from Christian Congregations in Slovakia, 10 from Jehovah's Witnesses, 6 from Jewish community, 6 from Islam, 6 from Czechoslovak Hussite Church, 6 from Seventh-day Adventist Church, 6 from Apostolic Church, 5 from Baptists Church, 4 from Paganism and natural spirituality, 3 from Hinduism and 1 from United Methodist Church.

== History ==
Present-day Lamač lies on the territory of four medieval villages. The first one (unknown name) was destroyed in 1241 during the Mongol invasion of Europe. Blumenau and Sellendorf were founded between 1279-1288 and de facto ceased to exist by 1496, probably because of frequent border disputes and their division between the heirs of the original founder.

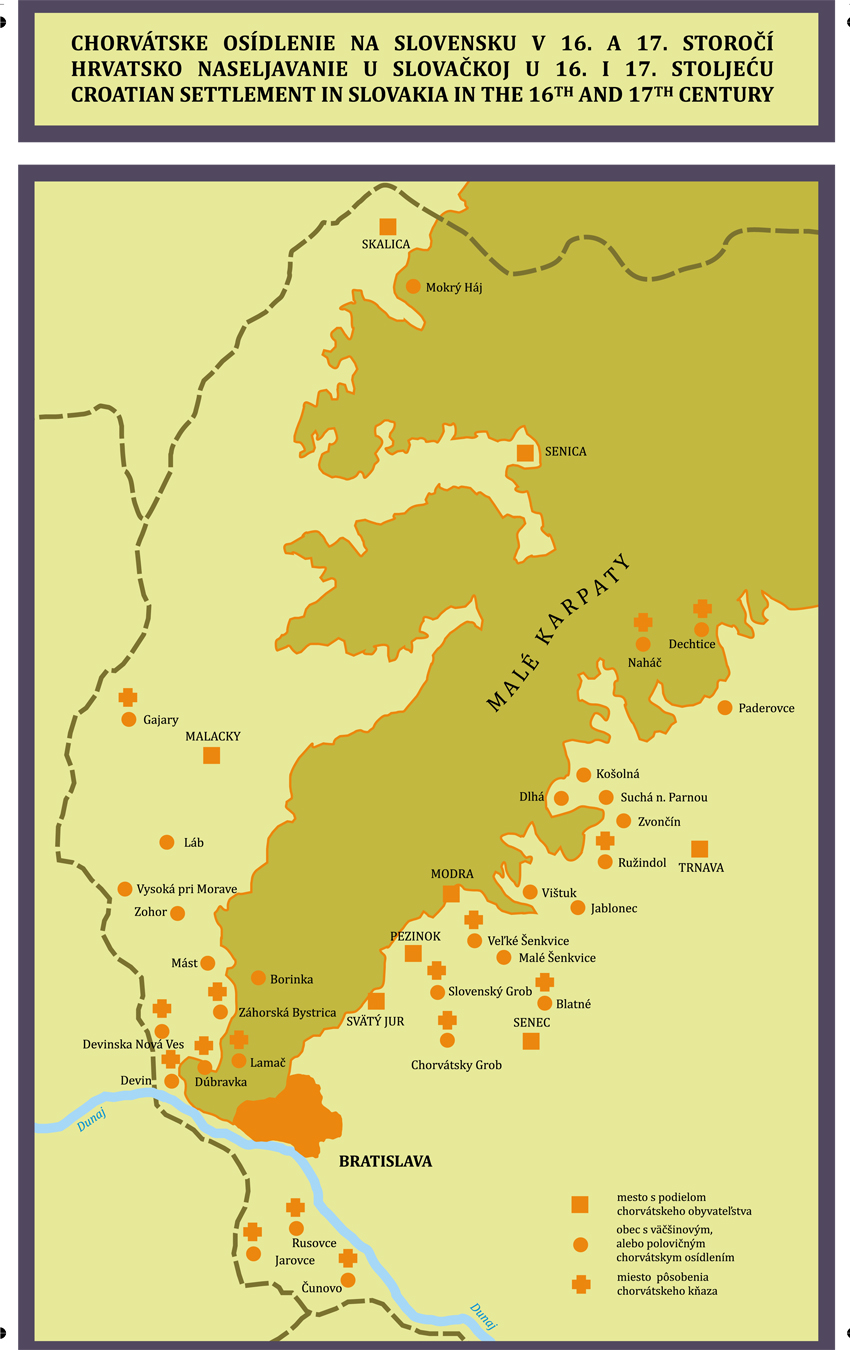
Croatian settlement in Slovakia in the 16th and 17th century

Croats fleeing the Ottoman wars settled the area in the 16th century. Ongoing territorial disputes between the city of Bratislava and the holders of the Stupava-Pajstun castle led to the establishment of several royal commissions (in 1574, 1582, 1585, 1590, and 1593). From testimony there, it has been deduced that the village was likely founded by a certain Hans Krabat (literally "Croatian Jan") (probably Jan or Lukas Skerlič). It was (first) mentioned as Krabatendorff (Croatian Village) in 1547 and two years later under its Slavic name Lamas (7 January 1549). It is north of where Blumenau was located.

The name Lamač is believed to have been derived from the occupation of its early inhabitants, who were engaged in breaking stone at the nearby Sidina quarry. The early name Lamocz was gradually adapted to German, Latin, Hungarian, and, most recently, Slovak diction. It has been recorded under the following names: 1540 Lamocz, Lama, 1555 Lamoch, Lamach, 1773 Lamacs, Blamenau, Lamacž, 1786 Lamacsch, Plamenau, 1808 Lamacs, Blumenau, Plamenau, Lamač, 1863 Lamács, 1873-1913 Lamacs, and since 1920 Lamač.

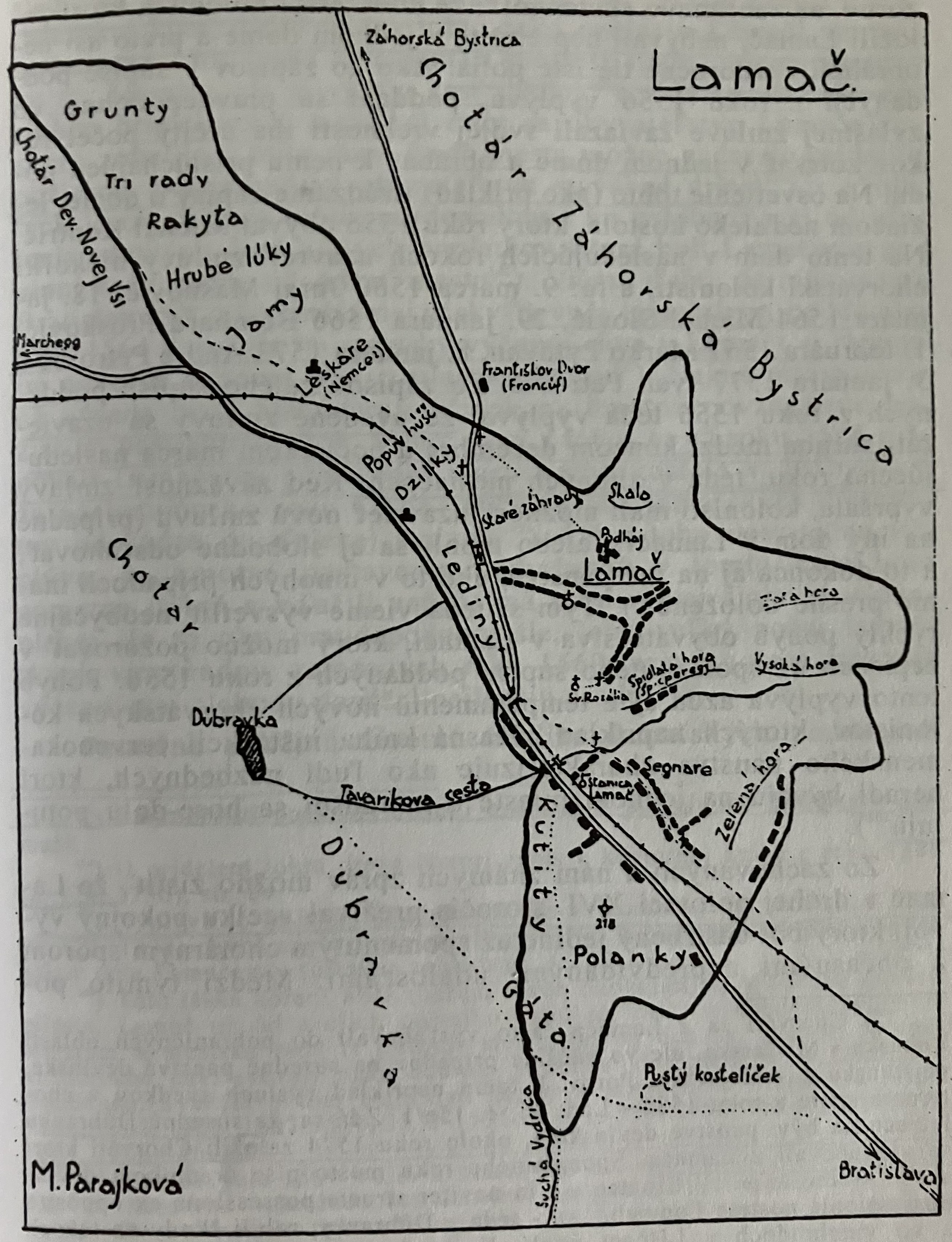
1948 map

The area was mostly forested. The fields of Dzílky, Popúv Húšč and Lediny were still forested in 1567. The forests were later cleared for agricultural purposes as well as for the construction of houses. In 1526, there were four houses in the village. By 1556, there were 54, with an additional 26 added by 1580. Houses were initially built of wood, but around the middle of the 17th century, it was gradually replaced by clay. Stone was used for construction from the mid-19th century. Roofs were covered with straw, with wealthier peasants using slate from the nearby quarries in Marianka.

The earliest houses were very simple and consisted of a single room adjacent to a shed, in which cattle and household tools were placed. Some two-room houses were built, which consisted of a room and a hall. By the 17th century and continuing on until the early 1930s, three-room houses were built, consisting of a room, hall, and larder.

Settlers maintained contact with their places of origin in Croatia until the early 18th century. While they initially retained their Croatian mother tongue and customs, they were influenced over time by Moravian Slovak elements from the Záhorie region. A visitor in 1782 noted that while villagers speak both Slovak and Croatian, Slovak predominated in the surrounding area. By the first half of the 19th century, traditional garb had shed its Croatian influences.

By 1560, vineyards were established. It is likely the Croatians brought their viticulture traditions with them from the south and that they began planting by 1550. An inventory of vineyards from 26 September 1560 lists 4 "old" and 46 "new" vineyards. By 1624, there were 149 vineyards: 35 on Spitsbergen, 16 on Zelena hora, 47 on Zlata hora, 36 on Vysoka hora, and 15 on Nevolna hora. By the 18th century, the total number of vineyards had declined to 139.

A fire in the spring of 1561 destroyed the wooden chapel of St. Margita and a large part of the village. In 1564, the Bratislava City Council donated the town tavern to their Lamač subjects together with permission to serve wine from their own harvest.

The village suffered from several military conflicts. It was devasted by anti-Ottoman armies in 1579-81, 1596, 1604, and 1624. As a result, by 1618 the number of inhabited houses had been reduced to 10 and by 1626 to just 1. A canonical visitor in 1634 found only 50 houses and approximately 200 inhabitants. It was unable to support a parish priest and the village became a branch of the parish of Záhorská Bystrica until 1752.

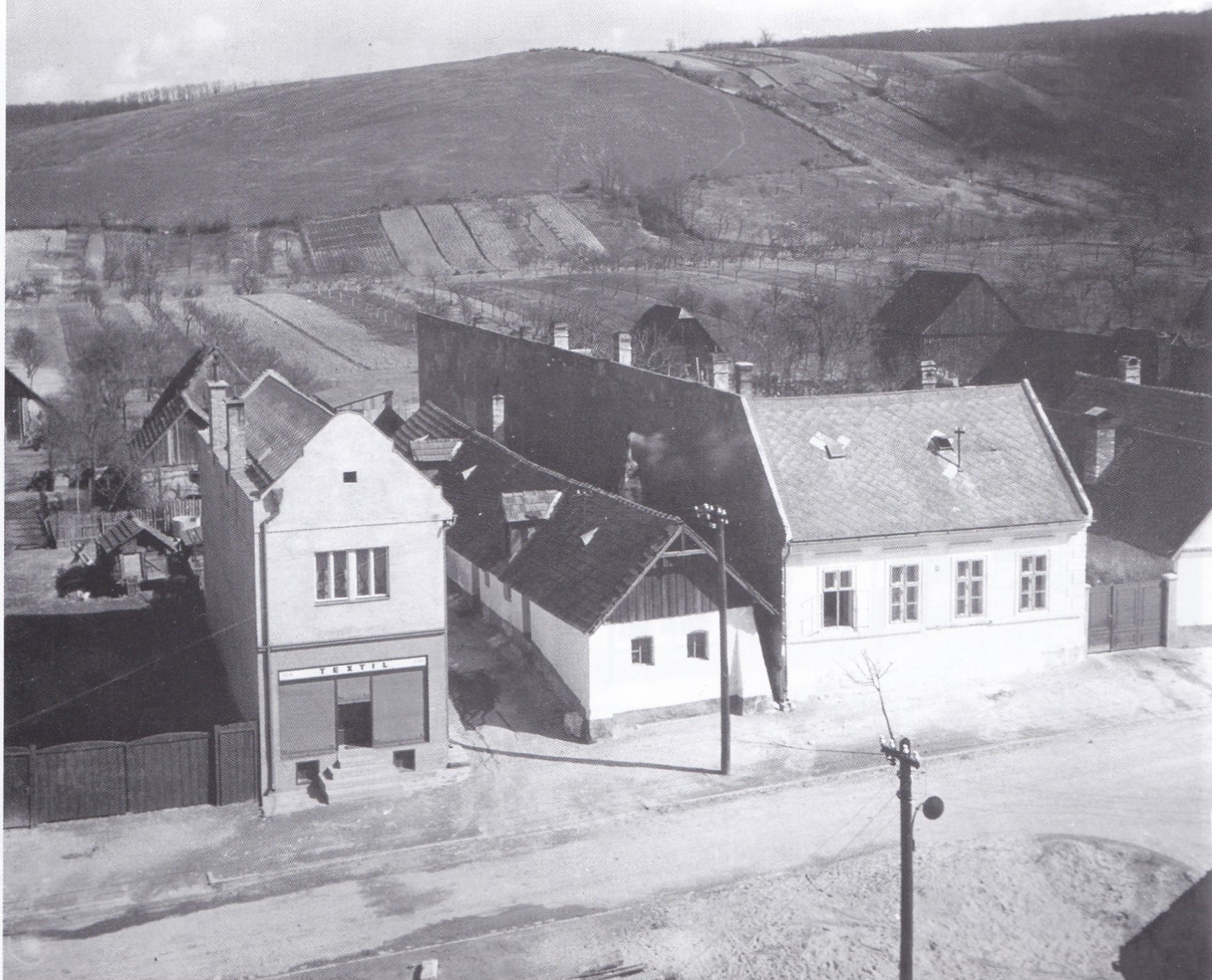
School (center-right) in 1949

By 1634, the village was employing a teacher from Zahorska Bystrica and this practice continued until the mid-18th century. During a canonical visitation in 1734, it was noted that the teacher taught only village boys. In 1752, a one-room school was established. Until that time, teaching took place in the home. In 1892, the village built a two-room school with two teachers' residence attached. It was expanded to three rooms in 1911. One teacher's residence was converted into a fourth room in 1933.

In 1639, the village constructed the church of St. Margita. When a part of the church collapsed in 1660, it was repaired and a new bell added. By 1667, there were 84 houses. The Chapel of St. Rosalia was built in the years 1680-1682 by the city of Bratislava out of gratitude for the end of an outbreak of the plague in the years 1678-1679.

During Rákóczi's War of Independence (1703–11), the imperial army looted the village four times. By 1712, there were only 39 families living in the village, the rest of the population having dispersed to neighboring estates. 27 abandoned properties were left lying idle.

In 1713, a plague raged through Bratislava. In 1714, it further thinned the population of the village as evidenced by a large cholera pit in the old village cemetery.

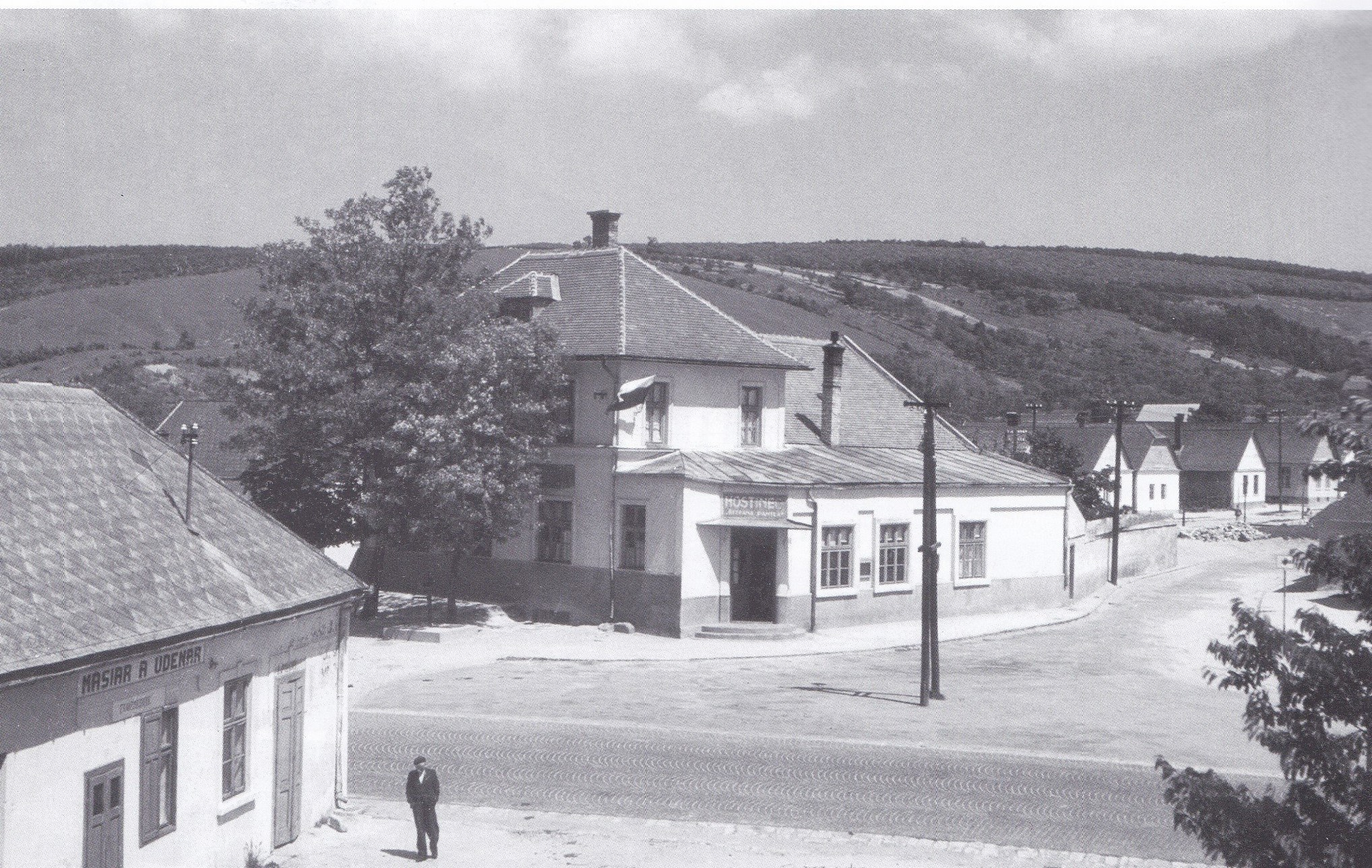
Butcher & Inn in 1949

In 1718, an inn was built and in 1719, a brewery. By 1736, the village had its own butcher.

1733 map of Lamacs

In 1751, Maria Theresa reaffirmed the village's subjugation to the city of Bratislava.

In 1768, the village contained 124 families with a total population of 620.

Fires in 1811, 1845, 1899, and 1918 destroyed large portions of the village.

In 1813, a cholera outbreak killed 70 people between 3 September and 23 October. In 1836, another outbreak killed 40 people between 7 July and 22 September.

In 1828 there were 123 houses and 881 residents who worked as farmers, winemakers and, from the early 20th century, also as workers in Bratislava factories.

1837 map of Blumenau (Lamacs)

In 1846, construction of a railroad began. Inadequate sanitary conditions following the influx of workers and their families led to an outbreak of typhoid fever that killed 65 inhabitants that year and 83 the next. The Bratislava-Gänserndorf line opened on 20 August 1848.

In September 1848, serfdom was abolished and the village ceased to be a subject municipality of Bratislava.

The final battle of the Austro-Prussian War, the Battle of Lamač, took place on 22 July 1866. Large fires erupted in both Lamač and neighboring Dúbravka as a result of the artillery duel. Between 4 September 1866 and 4 September 1866, 77 inhabitants died from an outbreak of cholera.

In 1882, a volunteer fire department was established.

1889 map of Blumenau

At the end of the 19th century, the village was mostly Slovak (93,3% in 1900).

1900 map of Lamacs

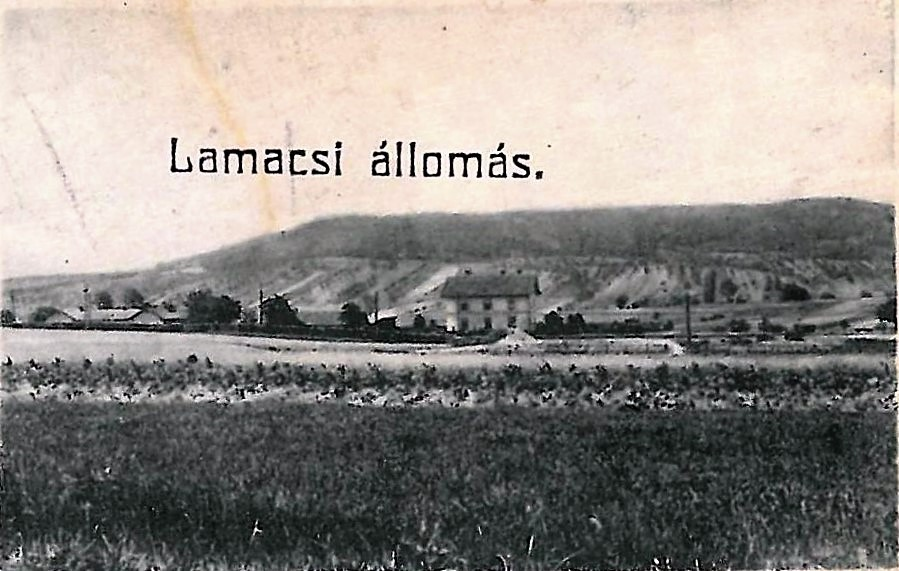
Railway station & vineyards in 1913

Slovak national revivalist and politician Ferdinand Juriga (1874-1950), in his memoirs (published in 1937), fondly remembers Lamač residents Adam Vozar, Filip Bucic, mayor Jan Haraslin, Gregor Hlubik, and especially Frantisek Hergott, who bravely and openly supported the Slovak national movement.

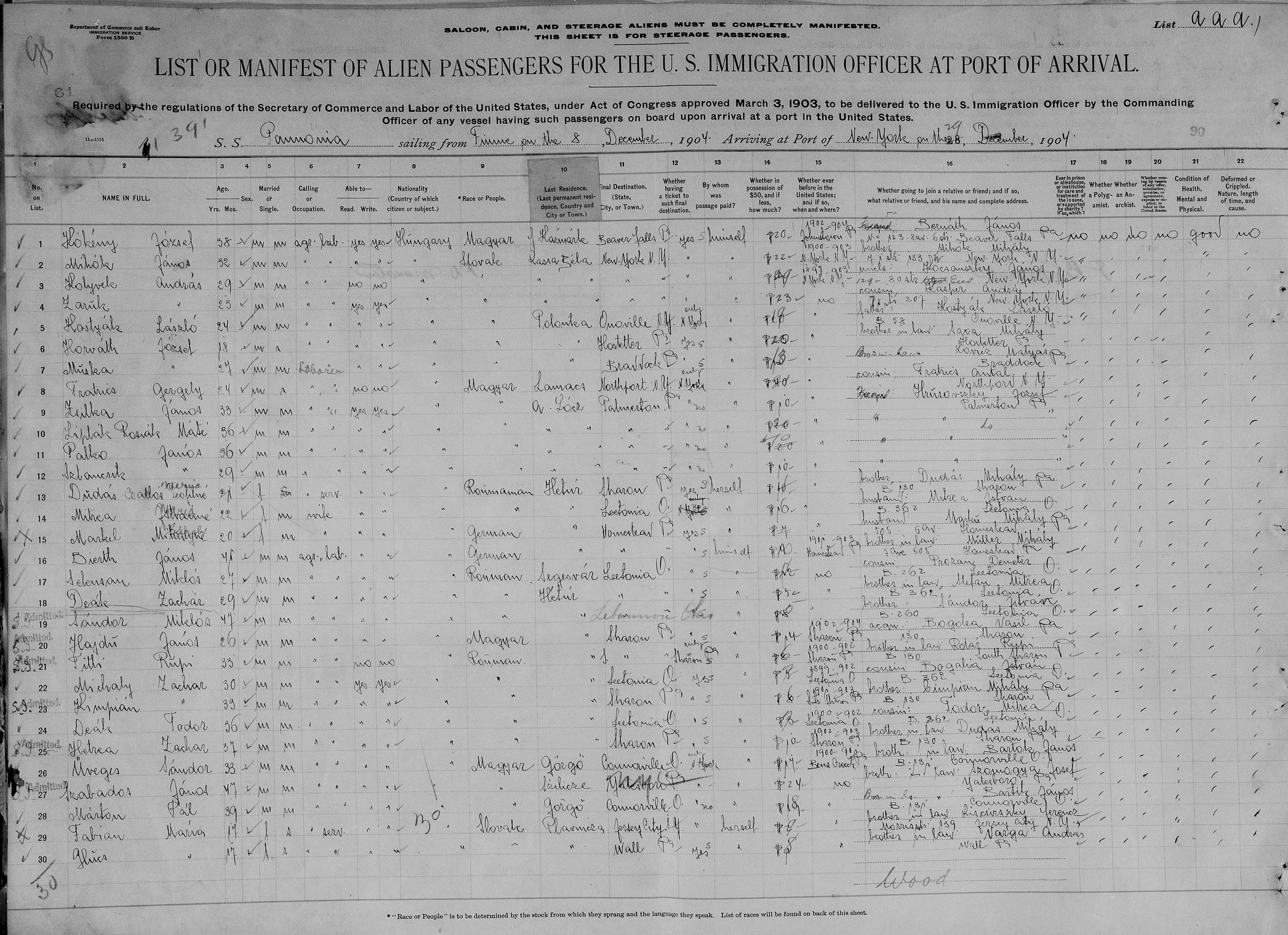
Lamacs on Ellis Island passenger manifest 1904

A number of villagers emigrated to the United States of America in the early 20th century. Many of their names are recorded at Ellis Island including that of Gregor Fratric (1880-?) who arrived 29 December 1904. They are known to have settled in Illinois, Michigan, New Jersey, and Ohio.

During World War I, the village suffered from the effects of mobilization, requisitioning, and inflation. At the end of the war, Lamač was occupied by Hungarian forces. On 4 December 1918, Lamač volunteers Valentin Vozar (son of Adam), Vincent Vozar, Juraj Kovacic, Dominik Foltin, Ignac Fribert, Damian Kompanik, and Jozef Lucenic crossed the front to join Czechoslovak army units in Malacky. On 31 December 1918, Czechoslovak legionnaires from the 33rd Regiment liberated the village during the Hungarian–Czechoslovak War.

After the World War I, the village became a part of Czechoslovakia.

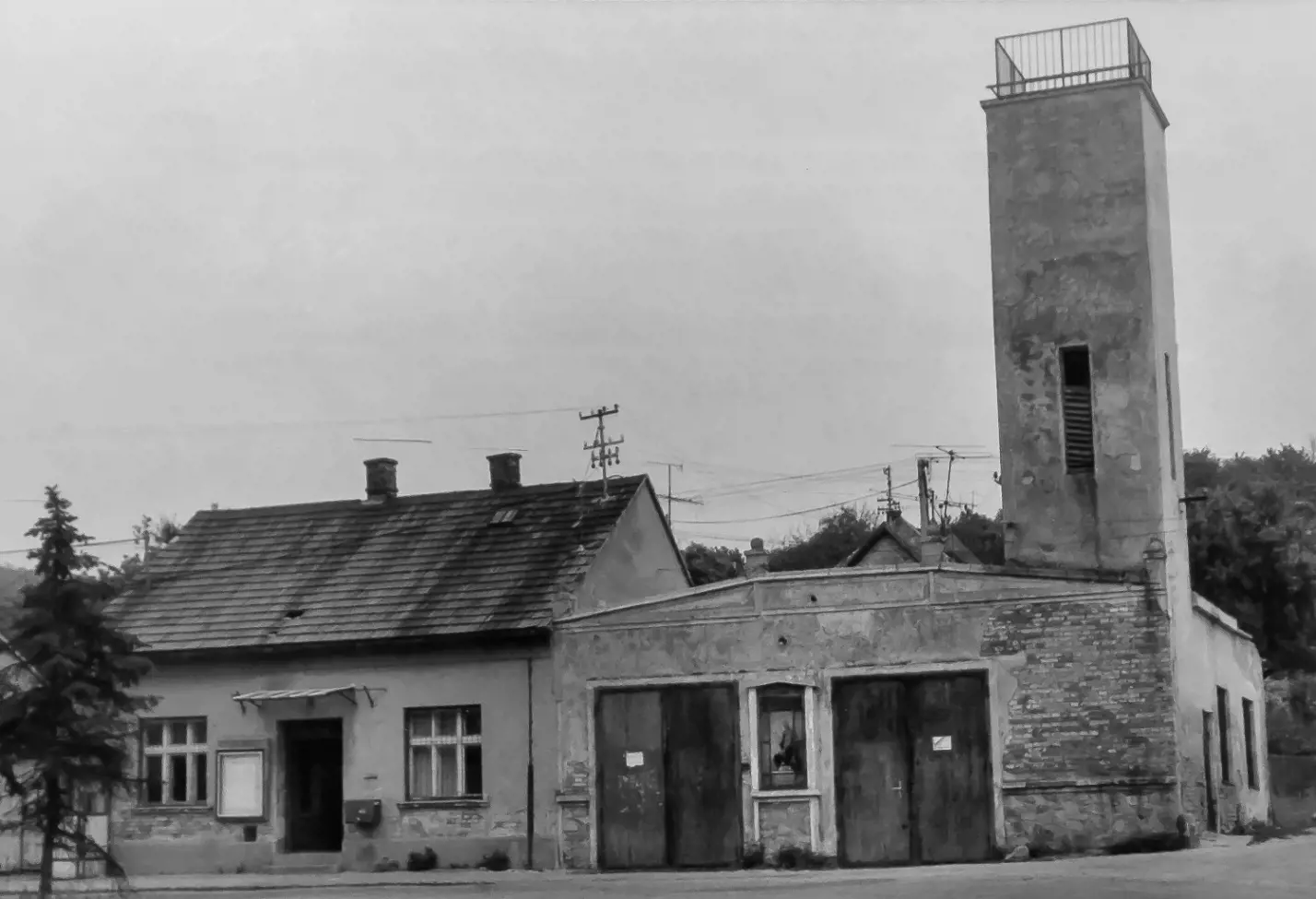
Post office building (L) and firehall

The first post office was established in 1921-1922. Before then, postal service was provided from neighboring Dúbravka. After the introduction of electricity in 1930-1931, a telephone line, a fire station, and a roller mill were established. In 1932, the village built a post office building. In 1935, a cultural center was built.

1925 map

1935 map

1938 map

After the dissolution and division of Czechoslovakia, Lamač was absorbed into the German Zone of Protection during World War II. On 16 March 1939, at around 18:00, 60 Wehrmacht soldiers occupied the village. Further reinforcements arrived on 17 March 1939 and anti-tank guns were installed on the road to Dúbravka, close to the railway station. The gendarmerie station was taken over and its members, as well as local members of the Hlinka guard, were disarmed and disbanded. German military headquarters were established in nearby Zahorska Bystrica and railway transport from Zahorie to Bratislava was halted. Local citizens could only travel to Bratislava with permission from the German military. On 19 March 1939, railway traffic was restored but German customs officers carried out passport control, with the justification that Lamač was now the border of Nazi Germany. On 25 March 1939, German soldiers were replaced by SS units who remained until 28 March 1939. These were in turn replaced by German border guards, who eventually left Lamač on 11 April 1939.

1940 map of Blumenau

On 29 August 1944, in the early days of the Slovak National Uprising, the 24th Artillery Regiment was transferred to the village and a battery was housed in the village school. Its task was to protect Bratislava from Allied bomber planes. On the day the uprising was announced, commander Karol Kostolný decided to go over to the rebels with his unit. But during the preparations on 1 September 1944, he was disarmed by a German patrol during a field patrol. His deputy Jozef Dzurenda issued an order to destroy all military material. Around 21:00, five trucks carrying spotlights and other battery material were destroyed using grenades and the soldiers fled Lamač around 21:30. They withdrew into the forests of the Little Carpathians along with several inhabitants of the village who supported the soldiers. Of 35 citizens of Lamač who participated in the uprising, 7 never returned home.

On 28 October 1944, a German unit moved into Lamač to manage fortifications. On 1 April 1945, Red Army units approached Bratislava and the German army retreated. The main retreat route led from Bratislava to the west, through Lamač. From 1–3 April, the main forces retreated, and only the units that covered the retreat and the destruction units remained. On 3 April, the German army blew up the railway bridge. On the same day, artillery units arrived in Lamač and shelled Bratislava until the next day, when they withdrew.

On 4 April 1945, around 16:00, the first Red Army patrol appeared in Lamač. In the evening, the Germans only held on to some nests of resistance, especially on Škarpa, west and northwest of the cemetery. In addition, German artillery from Devínská Nová Ves and Dúbravka shelled Lamač. The fighting continued until the morning of the next day. On the morning of 5 April 1945, the Red Army occupied the entirety of the village.

On 10 June 1945, a group of 18 Red Army soldiers "looking for women" shot and killed four villagers.

At the end of 1945, the National Committee of the city of Bratislava, in cooperation with the national authorities in Slovakia, dealt with the annexation of the surrounding municipalities. On the basis of the resolution of the Board of Commissioners dated 21 December 1945, on 1 April 1946 seven municipalities were annexed to Bratislava: Devín, Dúbravka, Lamač, Petržalka, Prievoz, Rača and Vajnory (Karlova Ves was annexed in 1943).

On 1 April 1946, it became a borough of Bratislava.

1955 map

1972 map

1973 map

1977 map

== Education ==
Lamač features one public elementary school and kindergarten, MŠ and ZŠ Heyrovského Street and one private elementary school and kindergarten Súkromná základná škola s materskou školou Heyrovského 2 also at Heyrovského Street.

== Sports ==
Lamač features a swimming pool Kúpalisko Lamač at Pod násypom Street, a winter stadium Ice arena at Borinská Street containing ice hockey stadium and curling rink, soccer playing field Futbalové ihrisko FK Lamač at Na barine Street and a multi-purpose sports hall at Na barine Street.

== See also ==
- Boroughs and localities of Bratislava
- Geography of Bratislava
- History of Bratislava
- Chapel of Saint Rosalia
- Bratislava Lamač railway station
- Burgenland Croats
- Burgenland Croatian
- Battle of Blumenau
- Lamač Gate
- Záhorie
- Croats in Slovakia
- Little Carpathians

== Gallery ==
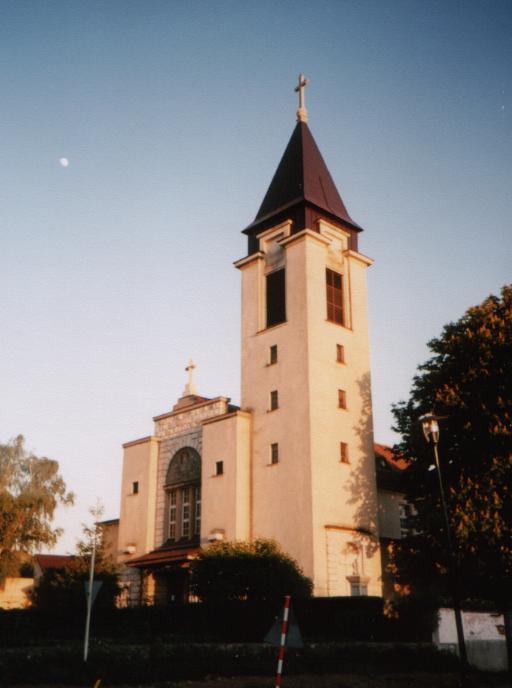
Saint Margita Church

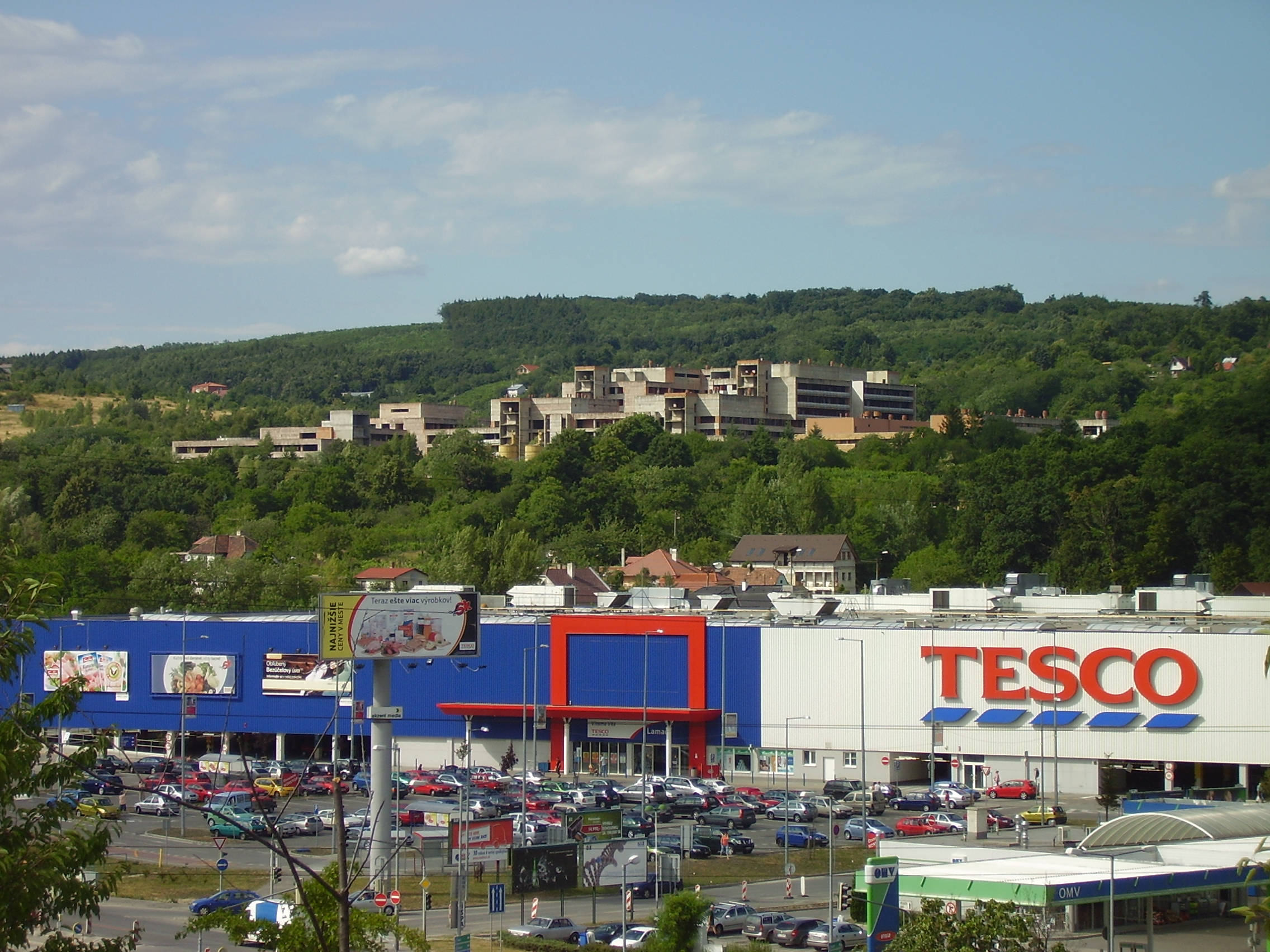
Tesco Lamač

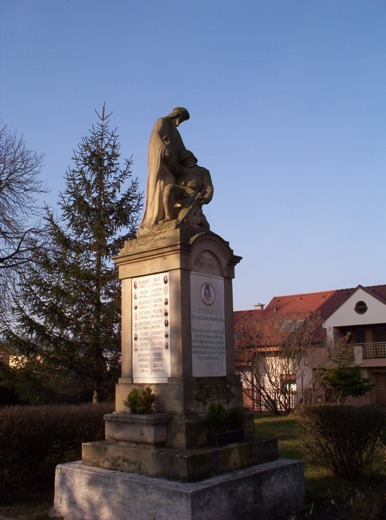
The Memorial to soldiers killed in World War I

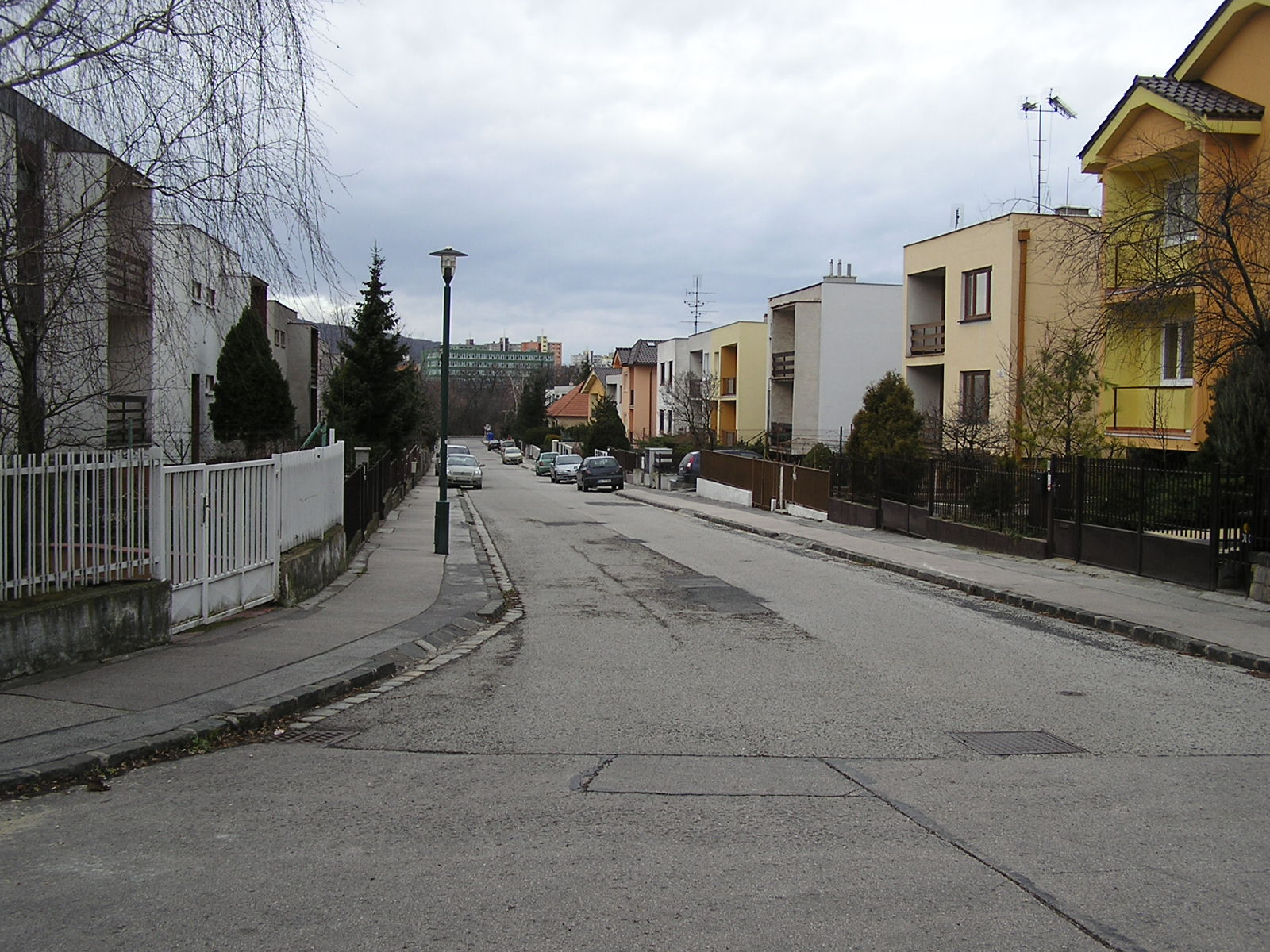
Zlatohorská Street in Lamač
