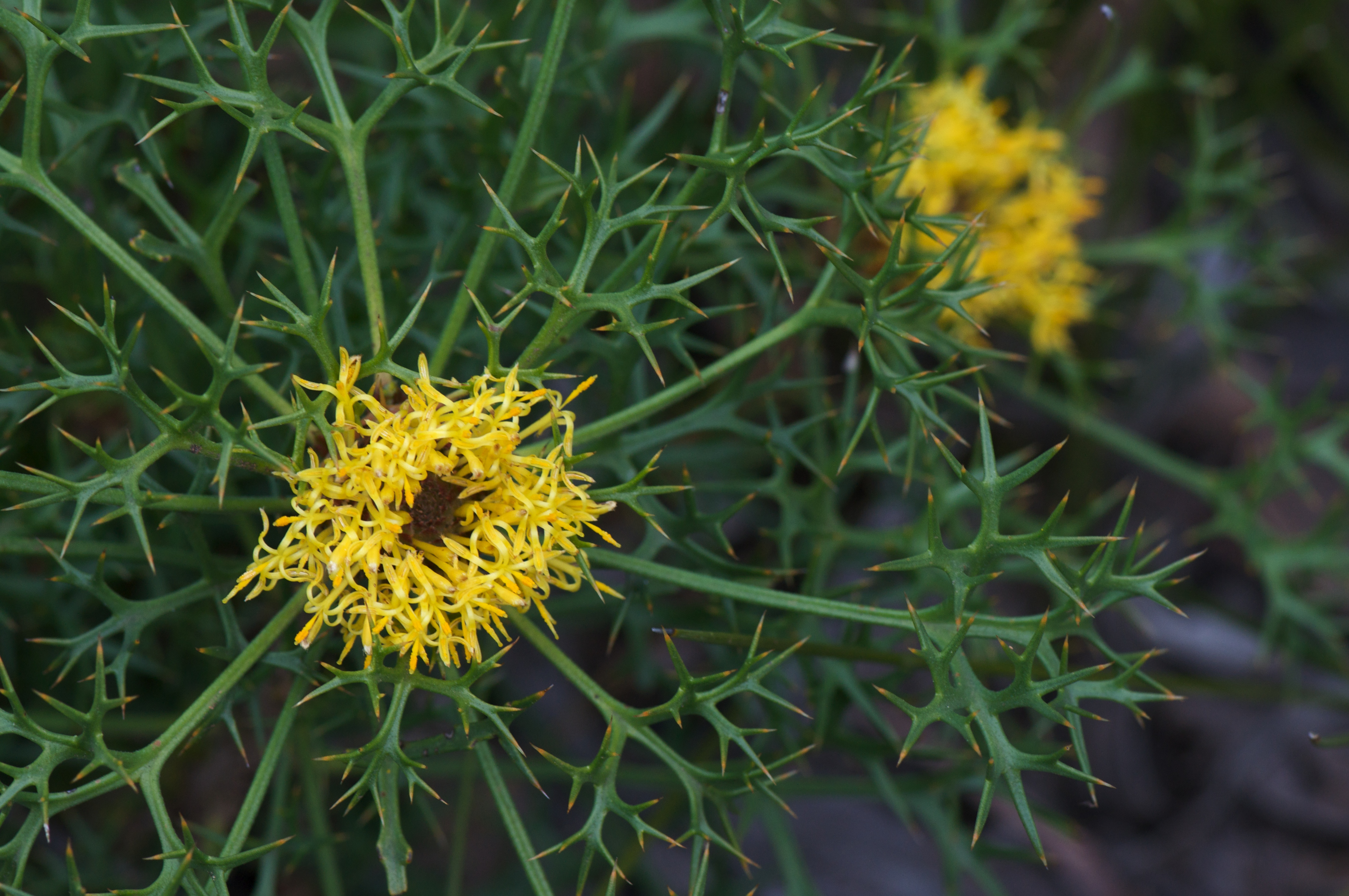

Conservation status
- Endangered (IUCN 3.1)

Scientific classification
- Kingdom: Plantae
- Clade: Tracheophytes
- Clade: Angiosperms
- Clade: Eudicots
- Order: Proteales
- Family: Proteaceae
- Genus: Isopogon
- Species: I. ceratophyllus

Binomial name
- Isopogon ceratophyllus R.Br.
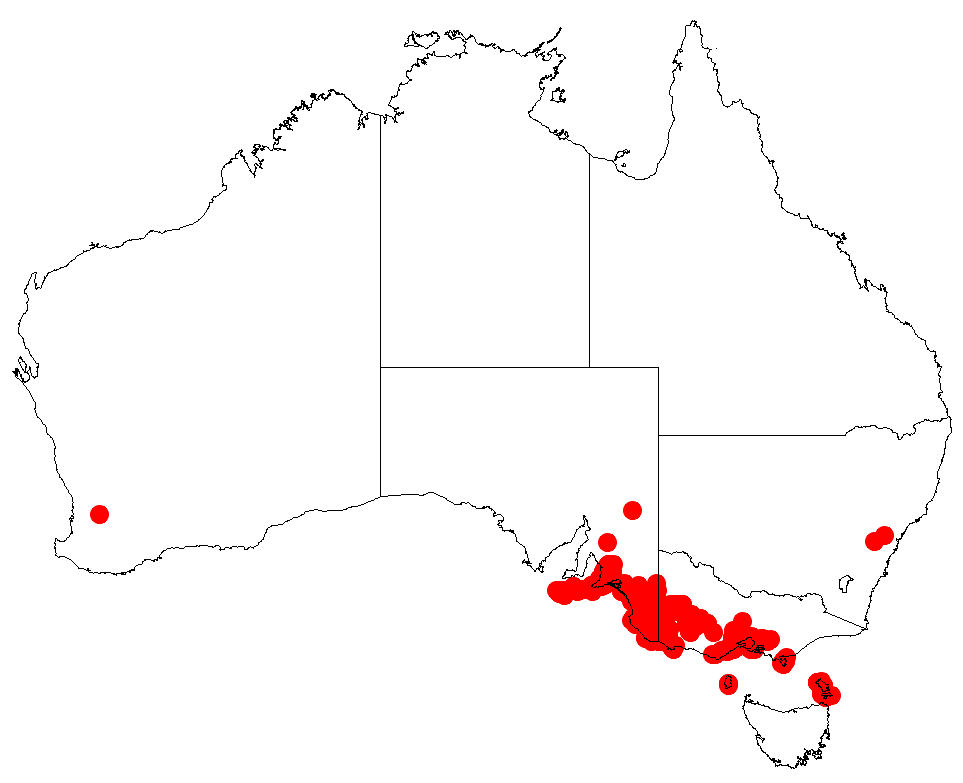
- Occurrence data from Australasian Virtual Herbarium

Synonyms
- Atylus ceratophyllus (R.Br.) Kuntze

= Isopogon ceratophyllus =

Horny cone-bush

Species of plant endemic to Australia

Isopogon ceratophyllus, commonly known as the horny cone-bush or wild Irishman, is a plant of the family Proteaceae that is endemic to the coast in Victoria, South Australia and on the Furneaux Group of islands in Tasmania. It is a small woody shrub that grows to 100 cm (40 in) high with prickly foliage. It is extremely sensitive to dieback from the pathogen Phytophthora cinnamomi

== Description ==
Isopogon ceratophyllus is a prickly shrub, growing to 15–100 cm (6–40 in) tall and to 120 cm (4 ft) across. The oval to round flower heads, known as inflorescences, appear between July and January, and are around 3 cm in diameter.

== Taxonomy ==
Isopogon ceratophyllus was first described by Robert Brown in his 1810 work Prodromus Florae Novae Hollandiae et Insulae Van Diemen. The specific epithet is derived from the Ancient Greek words cerat- "horn" and phyllon "leaf", relating to the leaves' resemblance to antlers. In 1891, German botanist Otto Kuntze published Revisio Generum Plantarum, his response to what he perceived as a lack of method in existing nomenclatural practice. Because Isopogon was based on Isopogon anemonifolius, and that species had already been placed by Richard Salisbury in the segregate genus Atylus in 1807, Kuntze revived the latter genus on the grounds of priority, and made the new combination Atylus ceratophyllus for this species. However, Kuntze's revisionary program was not accepted by the majority of botanists. Ultimately, the genus Isopogon was nomenclaturally conserved over Atylus by the International Botanical Congress of 1905.

Common names include horny cone bush and, from Kangaroo Island, wild Irishman.

== Distribution and habitat ==
The species ranges from south-western Victoria into the south-eastern corner of South Australia and in the Furneaux Group of Bass Strait islands, principally Flinders, Cape Barren and Clarke Islands. A King Island record has not been reconfirmed and is unlikely. It is the only Isopogon species natively found in South Australia. It grows on sandy soils in open eucalyptus forest or woodland, or heathland.

Isopogon ceratophyllus is listed as endangered on the IUCN Red List based on a February 2019 assessment. In South Australia, the Department for Environment and Water has classified it as least concern for much of its distribution area, and rare for some areas east of Adelaide.

== Ecology ==
Isopogon ceratophyllus is extremely sensitive to dieback (infection by the pathogen Phytophthora cinnamomi). Fieldwork in the Brisbane Ranges in 1994 showed that I. ceratophyllus, which had been common in areas before dieback and had vanished along with other sensitive species, had yet to return after 30 years. This was despite other sensitive species, such as grasstree (Xanthorrhoea australis), smooth parrot-pea (Dillwynia glaberrima), erect guinea flower (Hibbertia stricta) and prickly broom heath (Monotoca scoparia), eventually regenerating around 10 years post-infection. All Tasmanian populations are at risk of eradication by P. cinnamomi. Plants are perishing at Wingaroo Nature Reserve on Flinders Island from exposure to the pathogen.

== Cultivation ==
Rarely cultivated, it is slow growing and requires well-drained yet moist sandy soils. It would suit a rockery garden.
