= Bratislava Lamač railway station =

Railway station in Bratislava, Slovakia

Bratislava-Lamač
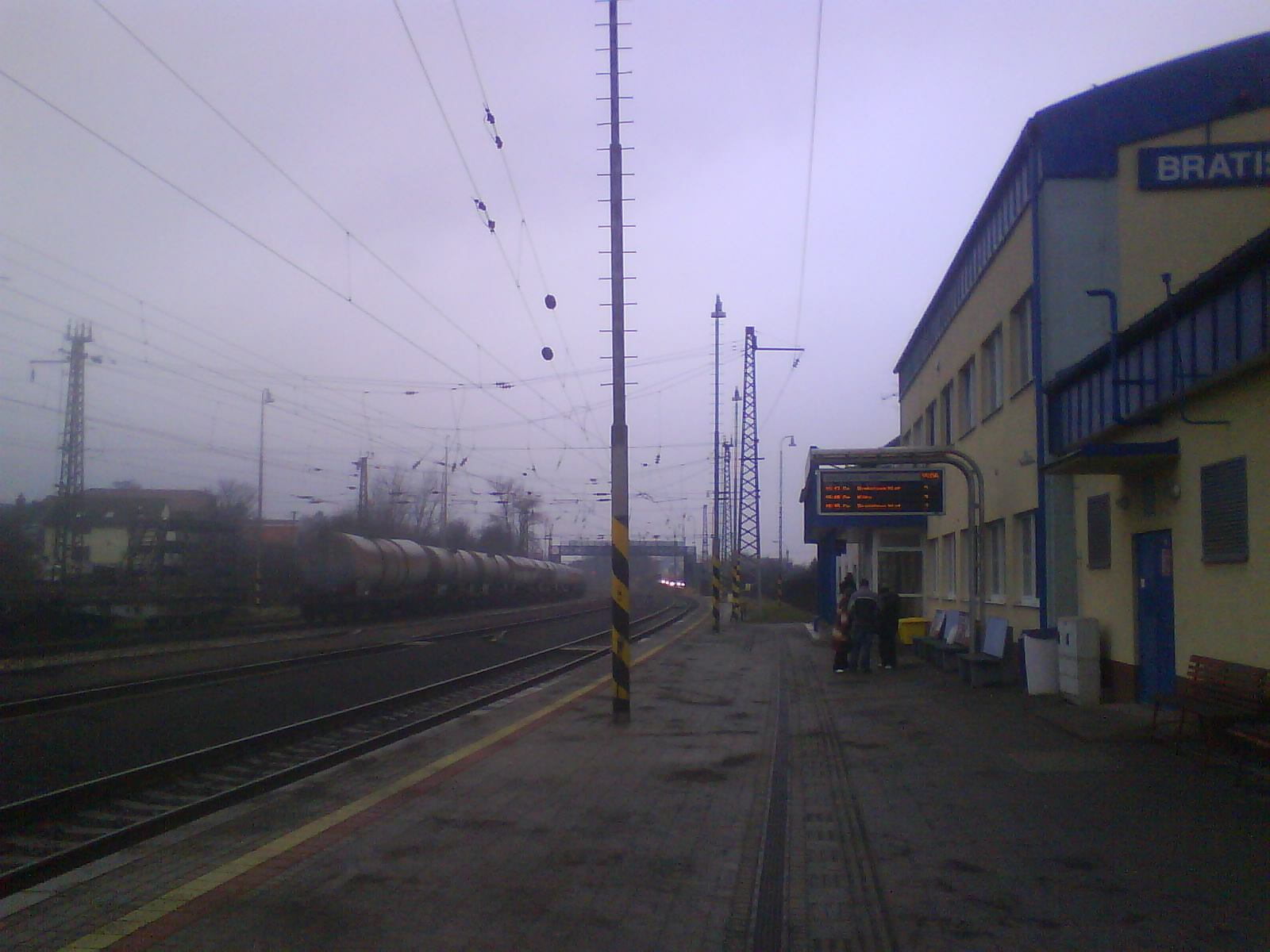
- Bratislava – Lamač railway station

General information
- Location: Lamačská cesta 6530/22; 84103 Lamač; Lamač; Bratislava IV; Bratislava Region; Slovakia
- Coordinates: 48°11′09″N 17°02′55″E
- Owner: Železnice Slovenskej republiky (ŽSR)
- Operator: Železnice Slovenskej republiky (ŽSR)
- Line: Bratislava–Kúty
- Distance: 49.147 km (30.539 mi) from Kúty
- Platforms: 3
- Connections: Public transport buses and night buses stop next to the railway station
Route map
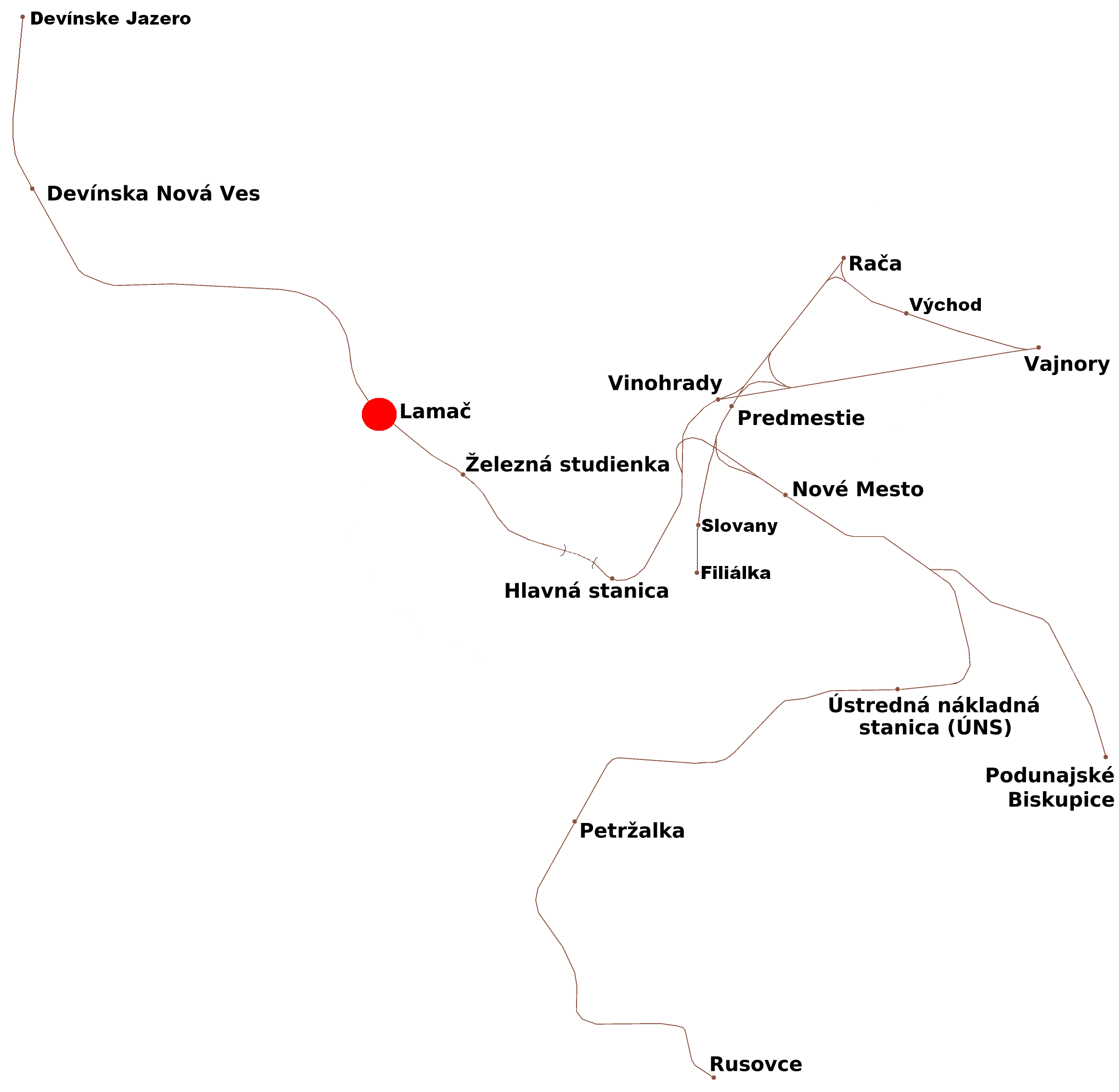
- Localisation within the Bratislava city rail network
Location
- Location within Slovakia

Bratislava Lamač railway station (Hungarian: Pozsony-Lamacs vasútállomás, Slovak: Železničná stanica Bratislava-Lamač, Czech: Železniční stanice Bratislava-Lamač) is a small railway station (technically a train halt) inside the Lamač borough of Bratislava, Slovakia. Until 1947 the station was called "Lamač". The railway station is administered under Bratislava main railway station, with the station master (Slovak: prednosta) residing there as well. It lies at the edge of the Lamač and Dúbravka boroughs of Bratislava.

Bratislava Lamač railway station is the smallest true railway station in Bratislava. It contains four tracks of rails allowing the trains to cross tracks or the express trains to overtake slower passenger or freight trains. The station building was reconstructed in 2007.

== History ==
In the past, stone from the nearby quarry was loaded onto trains here. The narrow-rail line for this purpose was built in 1924.

During the Second World War, the station served as transport hub for the nearby detention camp at Patrónka. From here, 7,800 Slovak citizens, mostly Jews, were deported into foreign concentration camps and extermination camps starting in 1942.

On 21 May 2012, a 41-year-old woman died when she stumbled at the first platform when crossing the lines, falling down under a passing train. The accident caused seven trains to be delayed for a total time of 201 minutes.

== Rail lines ==
The following is a list of rail lines crossing this station.

- Line No. 110: Bratislava–Kúty

== Access ==
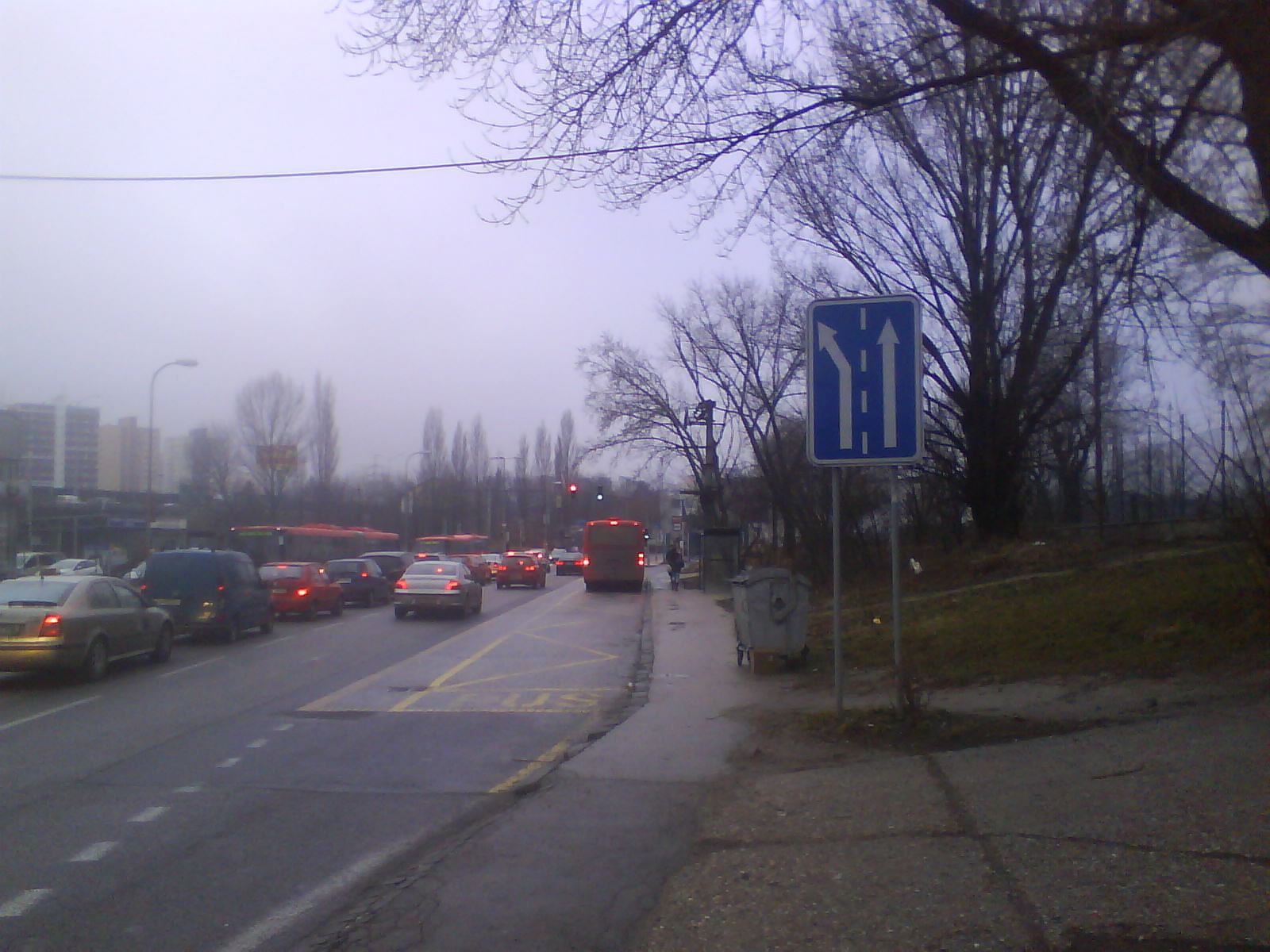
ŽST Lamač public bus stop in Bratislava. The actual bus stops (in both directions) are marked by red buses

A few meters away from the main station building there is a public bus stop called Stanica Lamač, sometimes officially abbreviated to Stn. Lamač. Buses no. 30, no. 37, no. 38, no. 63 and no. 92 stop here as well as night busses no. N21 and no. N37. The railway station is a short walk away for many people from the Lamač and Dúbravka boroughs of Bratislava.

This bus stop serves also as a minor intercity bus stop for buses headed towards Stupava and Malacky in the Záhorie region of Slovakia.

Preceding station		Following station
Bratislava Železná studienka railway station	ŽSR No. 110 Bratislava–Kúty–Břeclav	Devínska Nová Ves railway station
