= Lake Horney =

- Location within Florida Location within the United States
- Location: Polk County, Florida
- Coordinates: 28°01′59″N 81°56′21″W
- Type: reservoir
- Primary inflows: Rain
- Primary outflows: Seepage
- Catchment area: Peace River - Saddle Creek Watershed
- Basin countries: United States
- Surface area: 6.91 acres (28,000 m^{2})
- Average depth: 4 ft (1.2 m)
- Max. depth: 10 ft (3.0 m)
- Water volume: 8,566,835 US gal (26.3 acre⋅ft; 32,400 m^{3})
- Surface elevation: 138 ft (42 m)
- Settlements: Lakeland

Lake Horney, named for Julius Teague Horney, is a lake that is located in Polk County, Florida.

== History ==
The lake is named after Julius Teague Horney (1888–1959), who helped develop Lakeland in the 1920s.

== Nearby locations ==
- Lakeland Senior High School (Florida)/Lois Cowles Harrison Center for the Visual and Performing Arts
