= Horney Robinson House =

Historic house in Indiana, United States

- U.S. National Register of Historic Places
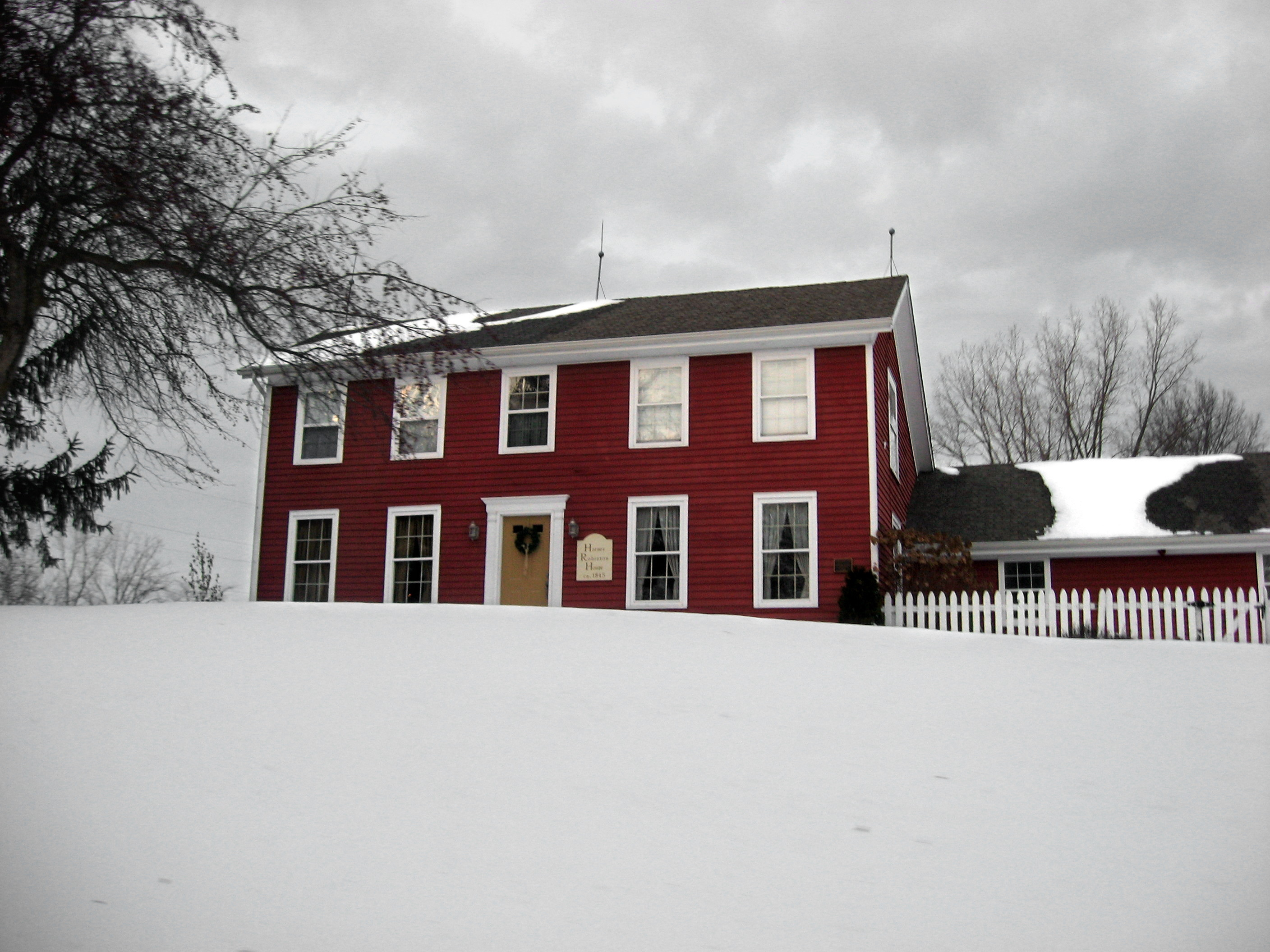
- Horney Robinson House, January 2014

- Location within Indiana Location within the United States
- Location: 7320 Lower Huntington Rd., southwest of Fort Wayne, Wayne Township, Allen County, Indiana
- Coordinates: 41°0′19″N 85°14′14″W
- Area: 1.1 acres (0.45 ha)
- Built: 1845
- Architectural style: Federal
- NRHP reference No.: 85000604
- Added to NRHP: March 21, 1985

Horney Robinson House, also known as the Gary Coffee Residence, is a historic home located in Wayne Township, Allen County, Indiana. It was built about 1845, and is a two-story, five-bay, Federal style frame dwelling. It has a side-gable roof and original native walnut interior woodwork.

It was listed on the National Register of Historic Places in 1985.
