= Horný Pial =

Village and municipality in Slovakia

Horný Pial Felsőpél
- Municipality
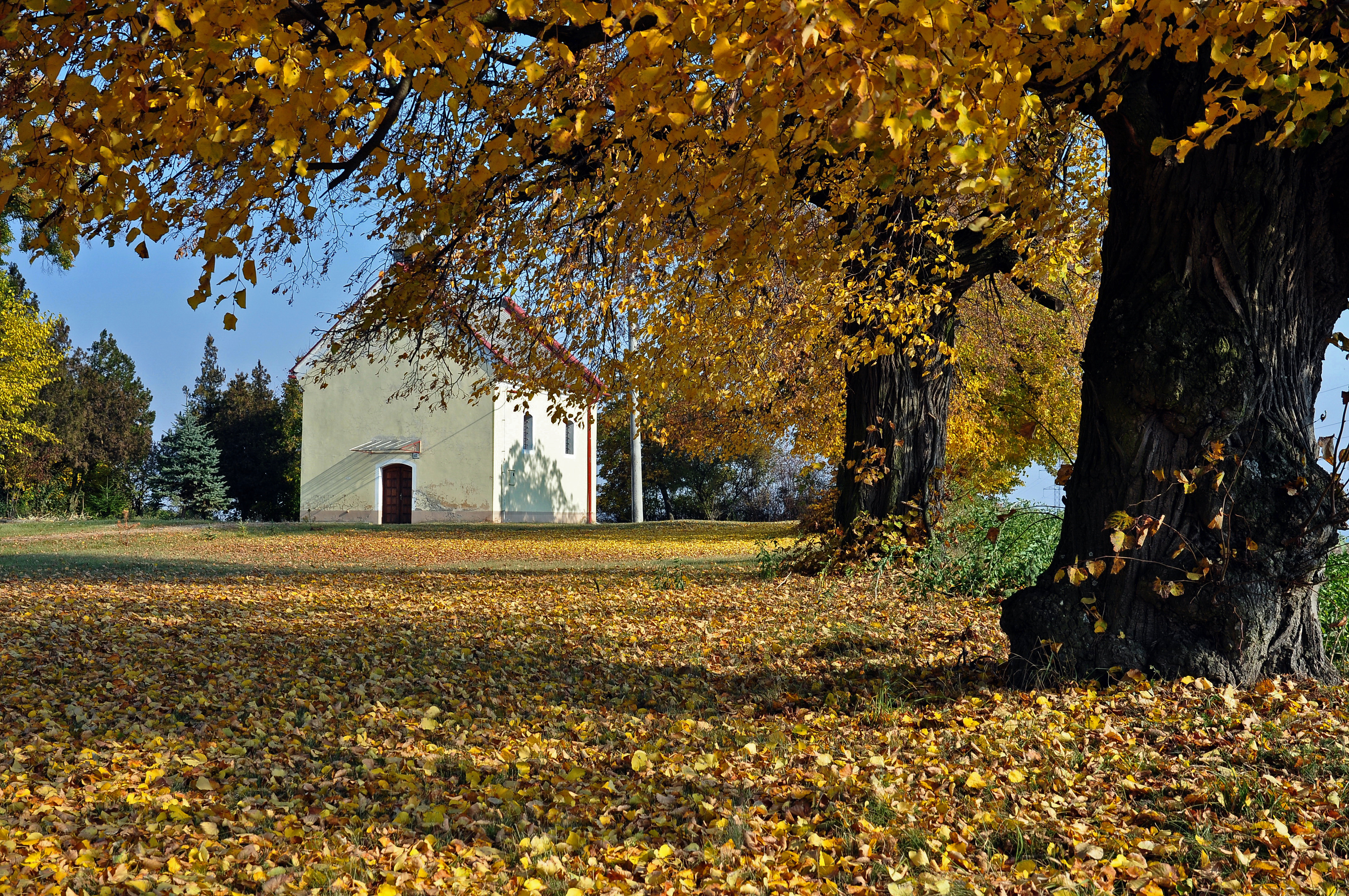
- Church of Virgin Mary in Horný Pial

- Flag Coat of arms

- Location of Horný Pial in the Nitra Region Location of Horný Pial in Slovakia
- Coordinates: 48.15°N 18.47°E
- Country: Slovakia
- Region: Nitra Region
- District: Levice District
- First mentioned: 1251

Area
  - Total: 6.35 km^{2} (2.45 sq mi)
- Elevation: 174 m (571 ft)

Population (2025)
  - Total: 285
- Time zone: UTC+1 (CET)
  - Summer (DST): UTC+2 (CEST)
- Postal code: 935 37
- Area code: +421 36
- Vehicle registration plate (until 2022): LV
- Website: www.hornypial.sk

Horný Pial (Hungarian: Felsőpél) is a village and municipality in the Levice District in the Nitra Region of Slovakia.

== History ==
In historical records the village was first mentioned in 1251.

== Geography ==
The municipality lies at an altitude of 174 metres (571 ft) and covers an area of 6.35 km^{2} (2.45 sq mi) (2025).

== Population ==
Population statistic (10 years)
Year	1995	2005	2015	2025
Count	305	301	265	285
Difference		−1.31%	−11.96%	+7.54%

Population statistic
Year	2024	2025
Count	287	285
Difference		−0.69%

It has a population of 285 people (31 December 2025).

=== Ethnicity ===
Census 2021 (1+ %)
Ethnicity	Number	Fraction
Slovak	184	68.65%
Hungarian	82	30.59%
Not found out	15	5.59%
Romani	9	3.35%
Czech	4	1.49%
Total	268	

In year 2021 was 268 people by ethnicity 184 as Slovak, 82 as Hungarian, 15 as Not found out, 9 as Romani, 4 as Czech and 1 as Austrian.

Note on population: The difference values of population numbers in the table "Population statistic" and in the sections "Ethnicity" & "Religion" is caused by the use of various statistical methods.

=== Religion ===
Census 2021 (1+ %)
Religion	Number	Fraction
Roman Catholic Church	141	52.61%
None	55	20.52%
Calvinist Church	49	18.28%
Not found out	11	4.1%
Christian Congregations in Slovakia	5	1.87%
Evangelical Church	4	1.49%
Total	268	

In year 2021 was 268 people by religion 141 from Roman Catholic Church, 55 from None, 49 from Calvinist Church, 11 from Not found out, 5 from Christian Congregations in Slovakia, 4 from Evangelical Church, 1 from Jehovah's Witnesses, 1 from Baptists Church and 1 from Apostolic Church.

== Facilities ==
The village has a public library and a football pitch.

== Genealogical resources ==
The records for genealogical research are available at the state archive "Statny Archiv in Nitra, Slovakia"

- Roman Catholic church records (births/marriages/deaths): 1725-1895 (parish B)
- Reformated church records (births/marriages/deaths): 1784-1898 (parish B)

== See also ==
- List of municipalities and towns in Slovakia
