= Dolný Vék =

- Village
- Location of Dolný Vék in Slovakia
- Coordinates: 47°52′N 18°10′E
- Country: Slovakia
- Region: Nitra

Dolný Vék (also, Vék) is a village in the Nitra Region of Slovakia.
