= Vysoká pri Morave =

Vysoká pri Morave Nagymagasfalu
- Municipality
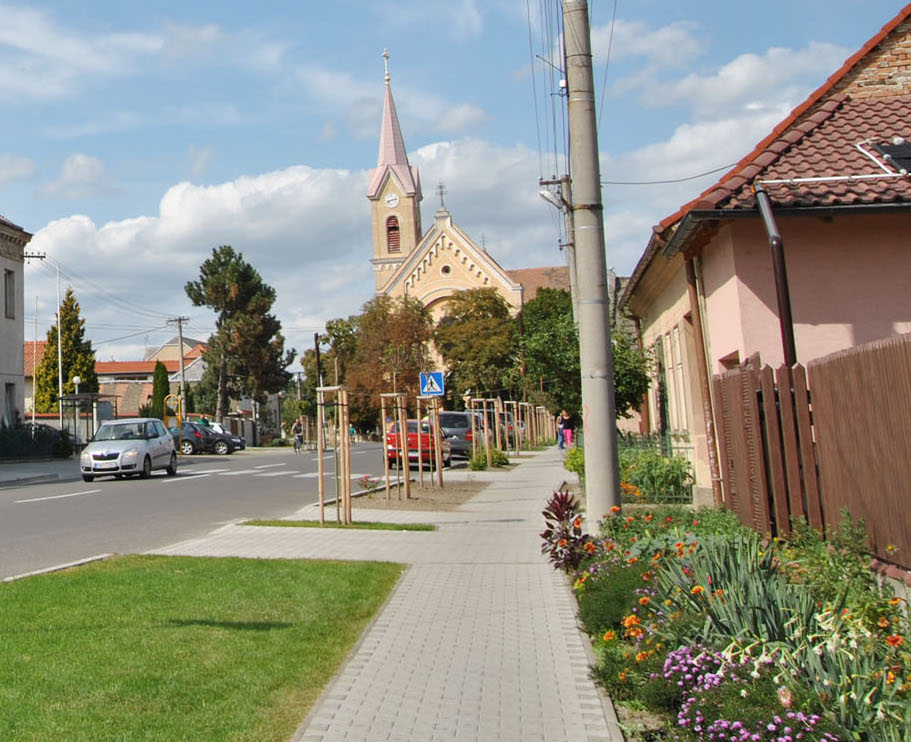
- St. Andrew's Church

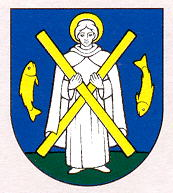
- Flag Coat of arms

- Location of Vysoká pri Morave in the Bratislava Region Location of Vysoká pri Morave in Slovakia
- Coordinates: 48.33°N 16.92°E
- Country: Slovakia
- Region: Bratislava Region
- District: Malacky District
- First mentioned: 1271

Area
  - Total: 33.57 km^{2} (12.96 sq mi)
- Elevation: 144 m (472 ft)

Population (2025)
  - Total: 2,212
- Time zone: UTC+1 (CET)
  - Summer (DST): UTC+2 (CEST)
- Postal code: 900 66
- Area code: +421 2
- Vehicle registration plate (until 2022): MA
- Website: www.vysokaprimorave.sk

Vysoká pri Morave (German: Hochstädten / Hochstetten; Hungarian: Nagymagasfalu) is a village north of Bratislava, the capital city of Slovakia. It is situated in the Malacky District, Bratislava Region on the border to Austria.

== Geography ==
The municipality lies at an altitude of 144 metres (472 ft) and covers an area of 33.57 km^{2} (12.96 sq mi) (2025).

== Population ==
Population statistic (10 years)
| Year | 1995 | 2005 | 2015 | 2025 |
|---|---|---|---|---|
| Count | 1806 | 1929 | 2247 | 2212 |
| Difference | | +6.81% | +16.48% | −1.55% |

Population statistic
| Year | 2024 | 2025 |
|---|---|---|
| Count | 2221 | 2212 |
| Difference | | −0.40% |

It has a population of 2212 people (31 December 2025).

=== Ethnicity ===
Census 2021 (1+ %)
| Ethnicity | Number | Fraction |
|---|---|---|
| Slovak | 2049 | 90.14% |
| Not found out | 203 | 8.93% |
| Czech | 26 | 1.14% |
| Romani | 23 | 1.01% |
| Total | 2273 | |

In year 2021 was 2273 people by ethnicity 2049 as Slovak, 203 as Not found out, 26 as Czech, 23 as Romani, 9 as Other, 6 as Hungarian, 2 as Austrian, 1 as Serbian, 1 as Russian, 1 as Polish and 1 as Bulgarian.

Note on population: The difference values of population numbers in the table "Population statistic" and in the sections "Ethnicity" & "Religion" is caused by the use of various statistical methods.

=== Religion ===
Census 2021 (1+ %)
| Religion | Number | Fraction |
|---|---|---|
| Roman Catholic Church | 1161 | 51.08% |
| None | 781 | 34.36% |
| Not found out | 216 | 9.5% |
| Evangelical Church | 31 | 1.36% |
| Christian Congregations in Slovakia | 25 | 1.1% |
| Total | 2273 | |

In year 2021 was 2273 people by religion 1161 from Roman Catholic Church, 781 from None, 216 from Not found out, 31 from Evangelical Church, 25 from Christian Congregations in Slovakia, 13 from Greek Catholic Church, 11 from Calvinist Church, 9 from Other, 5 from United Methodist Church, 4 from Eastern Orthodox Church, 3 from Paganism and natural spirituality, 3 from Ad hoc movements, 2 from Other and not ascertained christian church, 2 from Jehovah's Witnesses, 2 from Islam, 2 from Buddhism, 1 from Old Catholic Church, 1 from Baptists Church and 1 from Apostolic Church.
