= Kúty =

- Municipality
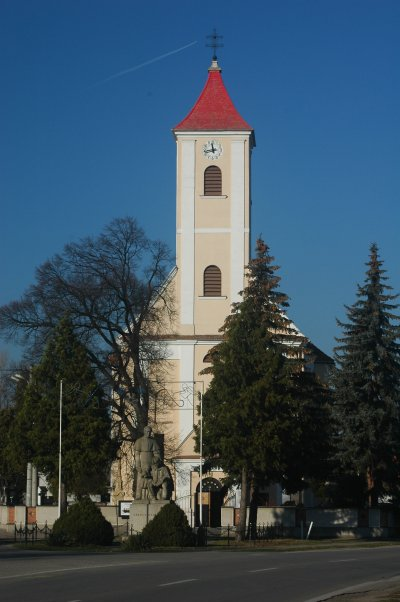

- Flag

- Location of Kúty in the Trnava Region Location of Kúty in Slovakia
- Coordinates: 48.66°N 17.02°E
- Country: Slovakia
- Region: Trnava Region
- District: Senica District
- First mentioned: 1468

Area
  - Total: 27.07 km^{2} (10.45 sq mi)
- Elevation: 156 m (512 ft)

Population (2025)
  - Total: 3,979
- Time zone: UTC+1 (CET)
  - Summer (DST): UTC+2 (CEST)
- Postal code: 908 01
- Area code: +421 34
- Vehicle registration plate (until 2022): SE
- Website: www.kuty.sk

Kúty, (German: Kutti; Hungarian: Jókút) is a village and municipality in Senica District in the Trnava Region of western Slovakia.

== History ==
The village was first mentioned in 1392 under the name Kuth. And in 1498 as Kwhty. Kút is equal to Corner - a distant place in the bend of rivers or roads or mountains.

The oldest archaeological find of historical settlement dates back to the Stone Age (2000 - 1900 BC) and later from the Bronze Age (1500 - 700 BC). Other archaeological finds are from the Iron Age of La Tène (500 - 0 after Christ) and from the pre-fortified and earlier fortified settlements in local parts Čepangát and Sigeca, in the historical confluence of the Morava and Myjava rivers.

In the Middle Ages, it belonged to the manor of Ostrý Kameň, later to the Czobor family. In 1645, the village was burned down. According to a document from 1678, when there were three mills in Kúty, Count Adam Czobor donates one of the mills to Pavel Dopiera. Since 1736 the village was owned by the Habsburg family.

In 1707 the first mention of the Chapel of St. Anne appears in the documents. In 1717 - 1726 the church of St. Joseph the Foster Father was built in the village, in 1826 the bell tower and in 1841 the church tower was finished.

The oldest part of the village is the part of Kaniža, in its immediate vicinity there is a part of Hribov (behind the church in the direction of Břeclav) and part called The Village (Bratislavská street) with characteristic historical building structures oriented perpendicular to public roads and courtyards leading to the street.

== Village symbols ==
The first seal of the village with a village coat of arms comes from the 17th century and characterizes the employment of the indigenous population - agriculture.

The village coat of arms is in a green shield, depicting a golden mouldboard in the upper part, and a silver plough underneath, with a green Mercury's rod on it (called caduceus). The mouldboard and plough symbolize agricultural tools. Mercury's rod symbolizes the geographic location of the village - the center of commerce, customs, and the intersection of major roads. The shield is in late gothic style. The colour of the coat of arms was chosen to match the basic rules of heraldry for the use of colours and metals.

The village flag consists of seven longitudinal stripes in green (1/8), yellow (1/8), green (1/8), white (2/8), green (1/8), white (1/8) and green (1/8) colours. The flag has an aspect ratio of 2:3 and is finished by three points, i.e. two cuts, extending into one third of its field.

The symbols of the village Kúty are registered in the Heraldic Register of the Slovak Republic under the sign K-11/2002.

== Geography ==
The municipality lies at an altitude of 156 metres (512 ft) and covers an area of 27.07 km^{2} (10.45 sq mi) (2025).

Kúty is located in the western part of Záhorská lowlands, about 4 km east of the Morava River and the state border with the Czech Republic. The village adjoins the village of Brodské in the north, Čáry and Kuklov villages in the east, Borský Svätý Jur and Sekule villages in the south and the Moravian town of Lanžhot in the west.

Kúty is an important traffic junction; through the center of the village leads the road I / 2 from Malacky to Holíč, which is crossed by road II / 425 to Břeclav and II / 500 to Senica. West of the village, the D2 motorway leads from Bratislava to Brno. The eastern edge of the village is bordered by the Bratislava - Břeclav railway line, which is connected at the local station by lines to Sudoměřice and Trnava.

== Importance ==
Kúty is one of the most important railway junctions in Slovakia, a meeting point of four lines. Being a railway border crossing, all trains travelling in the Prague-Bratislava railway corridor (including EuroCity trains) make a stopover in Kúty.

== Population ==
Population statistic (10 years)
Year	1995	2005	2015	2025
Count	4101	4121	4022	3979
Difference		+0.48%	−2.40%	−1.06%

Population statistic
Year	2024	2025
Count	4008	3979
Difference		−0.72%

It has a population of 3979 people (31 December 2025).

=== Ethnicity ===
Census 2021 (1+ %)
Ethnicity	Number	Fraction
Slovak	3853	95.46%
Not found out	141	3.49%
Czech	57	1.41%
Total	4036	

In year 2021 was 4036 people by ethnicity 3853 as Slovak, 141 as Not found out, 57 as Czech, 10 as Other, 9 as Romani, 7 as Russian, 7 as Hungarian, 6 as Polish, 5 as English, 3 as Greek, 2 as Vietnamese, 2 as Ukrainian, 2 as Rusyn, 2 as Romanian, 1 as Jewish, 1 as Italian, 1 as Serbian, 1 as Austrian, 1 as Moravian and 1 as Albanian.

Note on population: The difference values of population numbers in the table "Population statistic" and in the sections "Ethnicity" & "Religion" is caused by the use of various statistical methods.

=== Religion ===
Census 2021 (1+ %)
Religion	Number	Fraction
Roman Catholic Church	3052	75.62%
None	632	15.66%
Not found out	196	4.86%
Total	4036	

In year 2021 was 4036 people by religion 3052 from Roman Catholic Church, 632 from None, 196 from Not found out, 33 from Christian Congregations in Slovakia, 33 from Evangelical Church, 21 from Greek Catholic Church, 16 from Eastern Orthodox Church, 13 from Ad hoc movements, 11 from Other, 6 from Buddhism, 5 from Paganism and natural spirituality, 5 from Other and not ascertained christian church, 4 from Calvinist Church, 4 from Apostolic Church, 3 from Jehovah's Witnesses, 1 from Islam and 1 from United Methodist Church.

== Personalities ==
Andrej Ľudovít Radlinský (1817–1879) - worked in the place and is buried there. He was a Slovak Roman Catholic clergyman, a linguist, a religious writer. In the 1850s and 1870s, he intervened in economic and literary life with his versatile abilities and has unforgettable merits in helping the development of Slovak education, especially in saving it. He actively participated in the Slovak national political movement, a supporter of the cooperation of both catholic and evangelical confessions, a promoter of Czech and Slovak mutuality, a Slavophile. As a linguist influenced the development and codification of written Slovak, participated in the development and dissemination of Catholic religious writings and contributed to the improvement of Slovak education. Co-founder of Matica slovenská and the St. Vojtech (Adalbert) Association. Editor, publisher and compiler of religious publications. He published various school aids and manuals, his textbook Školník was an important tool in raising the educational level of the Slovak nation.

Dr. Matej Hések (1889 - 1973) came from a rich farming family in Kúty. He was related to important personalities of Slovak religious, cultural and political life, Martin Čulen, Eugen Suchoň, Ferdinand Klinda, Ferdinand Klinda Jr., Štefan Hések, Ondrej Ralbovský. He studied at grammar schools in Skalica, Esztergom and Bratislava. He studied theology at the University of Innsbruck. He had his primates in Kúty on August 2, 1914, at the time of the outbreak of the First World War. He worked as a field curate in the years 1917 - 1918 in Novi Sad. On December 1, 1918, he joined the grammar school in Skalica as a professor of religion and Slovak language, which became his temporary home. He also occasionally taught other subjects. He took an active part in the cultural life of the town, was the mayor of the local Orol and was responsible for the construction of the Orol House in 1929. In 1937 he became a member of the church examination commission in Trnava and in 1939 he was appointed as a church assessor. He worked in Skalica until 1946, when he retired. He then worked for four years as a spiritual administrator at the Hospital of the Merciful Brothers in Bratislava, then spent the next four years in the priestly ministry in Lopašov. He died at the age of 84 in January 1973.

Prof. PhDr. Pavol Palkovič, DrSc. (1930–2009) - born on the spot. He was a university lecturer and a Slovak theatre and literary theorist.

Mgr. Jozef Mikuš, (1934–1997) - was born and buried there. He was a high school teacher, regional historian, promoter of regional history and one of the founders of St. Gorazd tradition.
