= Horný Vék =

- Village
- Location of Horný Vék in Slovakia
- Coordinates: 47°52′N 18°09′E
- Country: Slovakia
- Region: Nitra

Horný Vék (also Vék) is a village in the Nitra Region of Slovakia.
