= Devín Carpathians =

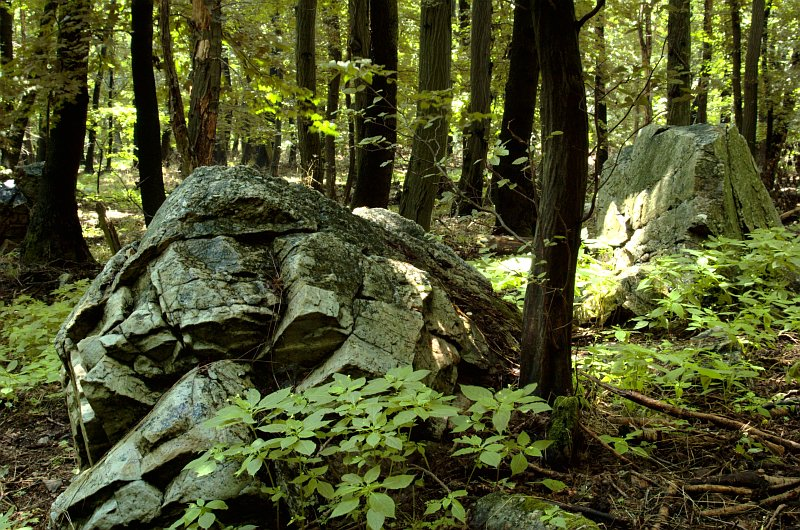
Forest in Devín Carpathians

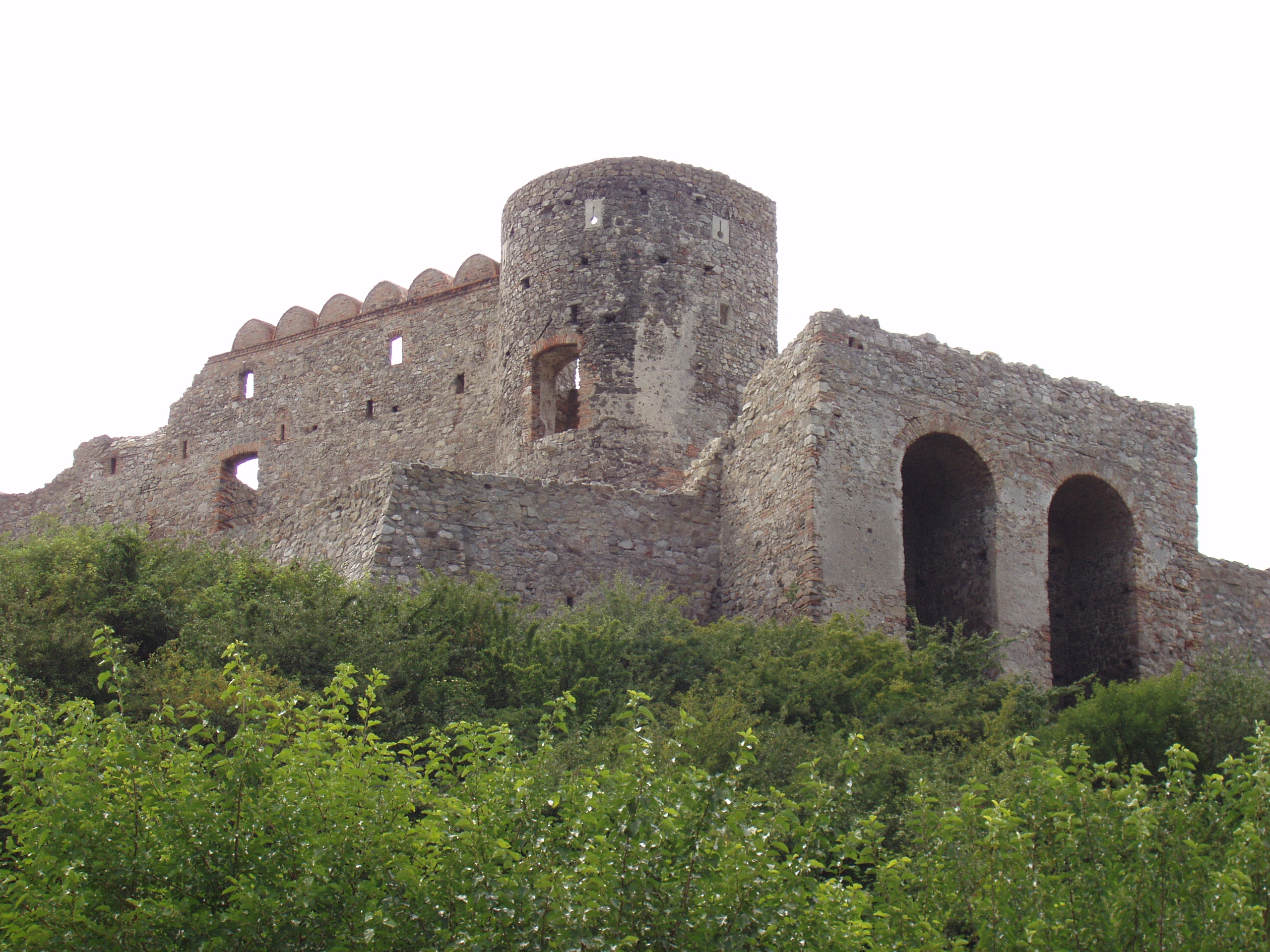
Ruins of the Devín Castle

Devín Carpathians (Slovak: Devínske Karpaty, pronounced [ˈɟeʋiːnske ˈkarpati]) is a subdivision of the Little Carpathians mountain range, located entirely within Bratislava, the capital of Slovakia. It is bordered by the city boroughs of Devín from the west, Devínska Nová Ves from the north, Dúbravka from the east and Karlova Ves from the south. Its highest mountain is Devínska Kobyla at 514 m (1,686 ft) AMSL, it is also the highest point in Bratislava. The hills are mostly forested with deciduous trees and most of the area is protected by numerous nature reserves, including two geologically important areas: Sandberg containing sands and sandstones from the Cenozoic Paratethys ocean and Jezuitské Lesy containing rare granitic pegmatite bearing niobium-tantalum oxide minerals.

Devín Carpathians are famous for its castles, most notably the Bratislava Castle and the ruins of Devín Castle. The mountains feature numerous cultural monuments, caves, tramping huts, an open-air geology museum and a chemical waste dump. Military structures in the mountains include an abandoned rocket base and preserved artillery fortifications from the time of Austria-Hungary. Featuring a dense network of forest trails, Devín Carpathians together with Bratislava Forest Park are frequented by citizens of the city and provide their main venue for hiking, mountain cycling, cross-country skiing and dog walking.

== Location ==
The boundary of Devín Carpathians consists of the Slovak-Austrian border in the middle of the Morava and Danube rivers from the west, the road connecting Devínska Nová Ves and Dúbravka from the north, the road connecting Dúbravka with the crossing at Patrónka from the north-west and east, and Mlynská dolina from the south. The mountain range is located entirely within the administrative boundaries of Bratislava.

== Division ==
Devín Carpathians are divided into four geomorphological areas, separated by a series of faults:

- Bratislava Foothills (Slovak: Bratislavské predhorie)
- Devín Gate (Slovak: Devínska brána)
- Devínska Kobyla (Slovak: Devínska Kobyla)
- Lamač Gate (Slovak: Lamačská brána)

=== Highest peaks ===
- Devínska Kobyla - 514 meters AMSL (48°11′19.968″N 16°59′39.66″E)
- Švábsky vrch - 360 meters AMSL (48°10′51.024″N 17°1′16.392″E)
- V06040801 - 358 meters AMSL (48°10′31.404″N 17°1′54.264″E)
- Dúbravská Hlavica - 357 meters AMSL (48°11′19.464″N 17°1′7.644″E)
- Hrubý Breh - 316 meters AMSL (48°10′29.964″N 17°2′26.664″E)
- Kráľov vrch - 284 meters AMSL (48°9′32.94″N 17°2′22.884″E)
- Sitina - 264 meters AMSL (48°10′14.484″N 17°3′22.932″E)
- Brižite - 257 meters AMSL (48°11′45.132″N 17°1′31.584″E)
- Devín Castle rock - 212 meters AMSL (48°10′25″N 16°58′42″E)

== Description ==
=== Geomorphology ===
Devín Carpathians consist of Paleozoic era landforms (south-eastern part), Mesozoic era landforms, Cenozoic era landforms, the latter including Quaternary period landforms.

There are 5 caves in Devín Carpathians: Abrázna cave, J06041401 cave, J06041402 cave, Medzivrstvová cave (original name Zlepencová jaskyňa) and Štokeravská vápenka cave (original name Stockerau). Abrázna cave is a 10 meters long karst cave. Abrázna cave was created as a result of coastal modelling by a prehistoric Cenozoic sea and like all of the others, it is inaccessible to the public. It is supposedly the westernmost cave in Slovakia, although actually it is rather the J06041401 cave. None of the caves are open to the public.

Notable rivers originating in the Devín Carpathians include Čierny potok and Mokrý jarok (also called Mokrý potok), the latter is a short stream originating at the Devínska Kobyla mountain, draining its south-eastern part. It flows into the Danube near the quarry at Devínska cesta Street, near island Sihoť.

=== Notable areas ===
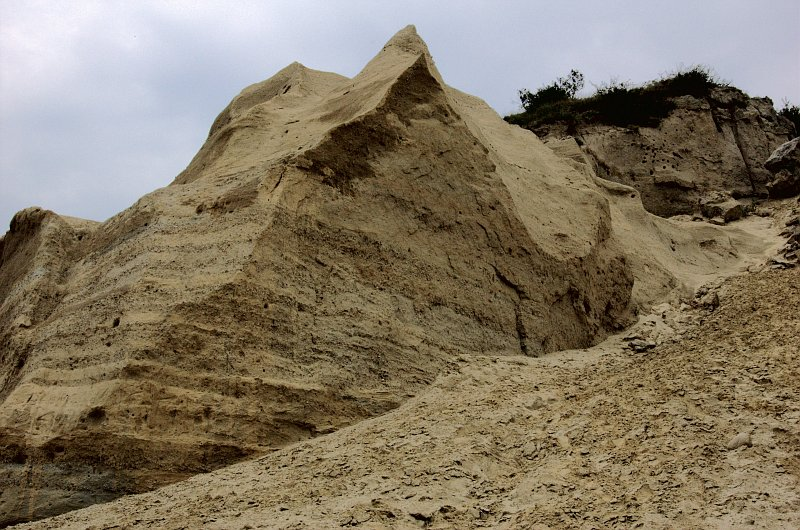
Sandberg mountain

- Abandoned military rocket base (Slovak: Rádiotechnická hláska protivzdušnej obrany štátu) located at the summit of Devínska Kobyla.
- Sandberg is a sandstone hill containing an important paleontological site, famous for its shark teeth, and bones of seals, whales and ancient monkeys.
- Sorbus domestica of Devín is a protected tree, rare in Europe. This specimen is 80 years old and 10 meters tall. The tree is located in the vineyards above Devín castle.
- Srdce (English: Heart) is a former quarry named after its shape. It contains a chemical dump of artificial asphalt waste from the bombed Apollo refinery, created in 1963 by the Slovnaft refinery in Bratislava.

=== Flora, fauna, and funga ===
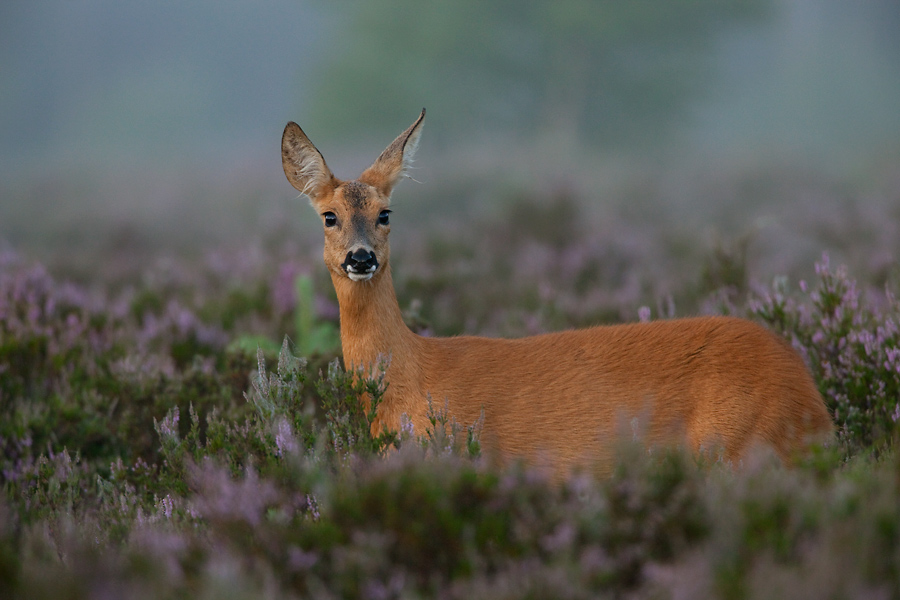
Roe deer is abundant in the Devín Carpathians

Flora and fauna is similar to that of the Little Carpathians, yet the area of Devínska Kobyla represents the edge of the thermophilic dry vegetation of the pannonian plane. According to the phytogeographical division of J. Futák (1964, 1972), Devínska Kobyla is grouped together with the neighboring Hundsheimer Berge in Austria, consisting of an area of xerothermic pannonian flora (Eupannonicum).

Much of the area is densely forested with mostly pine-oak or oak-hornbeam trees. Humans have been shaping the environment in this area for centuries and anthropic changes included cutting and burning forests, creating meadows, establishing vineyards and orchards, grazing animals and planting new trees. Today, the area of Devín Carpathians contains a mixture of stony and grassy forest steppe, shrublands and dense forests. Some areas are more often visited and continually being changed over the course of centuries, other areas are relatively intact. There are numerous endemic species living inside the protected areas. The mountains are rich in mushroom diversity as the small area of Devínska Kobyla alone contains at least 234 species of identified mushrooms.

Local flora contains approximately 1,100 species of plants, 25 species are protected in Slovakia. The area is notable for its Viola hybrids. Dominant flora includes Stipa pulcherrima, Carex humilis, Scabiosa suaveolena, Festuca valesiaca, Ranunculus illyricus and Bromus erectus. Protected plants include Adonis vernalis, Pulsatilla nigricans, Pulsatilla grandis, Anemone sylvestris, Lilium martagon, Stipa joannis, Jurinea mollis, Iris pumila, Dictamnus albus, Cornus mas, Prunus mahaleb, Fraxinus ornus, Chrysopogon gryllus, Vinca herbacea, Lathyrus pannonicus, Platanthera bifolia, Iris variegata, Himantoglossum adriaticum, Limodorum abortivum and Rhamnus saxatilis. Other plants include Ononis pusilla, Lathyrus sphaericus, Conringia austriaca, Potentilla pedata, Smyrnium perfoliatum, Bupleurum rotundifolium, Consolida orientalis ssp. paniculata and Asplenium adiantum-nigrum.

Fauna of Devín Carpathians is notable especially for its large number of species of heat-loving insects. Insects include Coleophora dianthi, Coleophora adspersella, Coleophora virgatella, Pandemis dumetanz, Trachismia rigana, Mantispa styriaca, Zanclognatha tarsipennalis, Yponomeuta vigintipunctatus and Procris gerryon. Protected insects include Saga pedo, Mantis religiosa, Papilio machaon, Iphiclides podalirius, Ascalaphus macaronius, Lucanus cervus, Parnassius mnemosyne and others. Amphibians include Salamandra salamandra, Bufo bufo and Bufo viridis, reptiles include Lacerta viridis, Lacerta agilis, Podarcis muralis, Anguis fragilis, Zamenis longissimus, Natrix natrix, Natrix tessellata and Coronella austriaca.

Birds known to hunt here include Common Rock Thrush and Saker Falcon, birds known to nest here include Common Buzzard. Mammals include the numerous Roe deer, also Fallow deer, Red deer only in the deep forest, Wild boar, Red fox and European badger. There are no wolves or bears in the mountains.

=== Protected areas ===
Almost the entire area of the mountain range is protected by the Little Carpathians Protected Landscape Area. A small 650 ha patch of Devín Carpathians is protected under the European Union network of protected areas Natura 2000. Additionally, Slovak law protects the following areas inside the mountain range:

- National nature reserve Devínska Kobyla (NPR Devínska Kobyla)
- National nature monument Devín Castle rock (NPP Devínska hradná skala)
- National cultural monument Devín Castle (NKP Devín - Slovanské hradisko)
- National cultural monument Villa Rustica (NKP Villa Rustica)
- Natural monument Devín forest steppe (PP Devínska lesostep)
- Nature reserve Fialková valley (PR Fialková dolina)
- Nature reserve Štokeravská vápenka (PR Štokeravská vápenka)
- Nature reserve Slovanský island (PR Slovanský ostrov)
- Protected area Lesné diely (CHA Lesné diely)
- Protected tree Sorbus domestica of Devín (CHS Devínska oskoruša)

== Tourism ==
The main access point to Devín Carpathians is located at the parking lot underneath Devín Castle. The mountains feature the following hiking trails:

- Red trail TZT 0701a – from Devín, parking to Slavín. Length: 15.7 kilometers, cumulative elevation gain 625 meters.
- Yellow trail TZT 8104 – from Devín, parking to Dúbravka, House of Culture. Length: 6.6 kilometers, cumulative elevation gain 296 meters.
- Blue trail TZT 2461 – from Devín, parking to Devínska Nová Ves. Length: 4.9 kilometers, cumulative elevation gain 244 meters.
- Green trail TZT 5114 – from Devínska Nová Ves to Devínska Kobyla summit
- Blue trail TZT 2436 – from Karlova Ves, OD Centrum to Dúbravka, House of Culture
- Green trail TZT 5136 – from Dúbravka, House of Culture to Dúbravka, Technické sklo

There are 4 educational trails (Slovak: náučný chodník) in the area of Devín Carpathians. All of them are administered by the city boroughs, which is why they are usually well-kept, unlike educational trails in other part of Little Carpathians, especially those funded by a one-time money transfer from the European Union or the city of Bratislava. Educational trails in this area have not been damaged or destroyed by legal logging like in other areas (for example the Lamač – Železná studienka educational trail inside the Bratislavský lesný park).

- Dúbravka educational trail (Dúbravský náučný chodník) - from MiÚ Mestská časť Dúbravka to ZŠ Sokolíkova, length 4.5 km, cumulative elevation gain 149 m.
- Devínska Kobyla educational trail (Náučný chodník Devínska Kobyla) - from Devín Castle to Sandberg, length 4.0 km, cumulative elevation gain 280 m. It features 5 information signs: 1. Národná prírodná rezervácia Devínska Kobyla, 2. Rastlinstvo Devínskej Kobyly, 3. Historické premeny Devínskej Kobyly, 4. Živočíšstvo Devínskej Kobyly, 5. Geologická stavba Devínskej Kobyly a Sandberg.
- Slovak island educational trail (Náučný chodník Slovanský ostrov)- information signs from the original Slovak island educational trail were moved to Slovanské nábrežie.
- Dendropark - information signs were vandalized in the past, but are restored as of 2011.

== See also ==
- Geomorphological division of Slovakia
- Devín Castle
- Bratislava Castle
- Little Carpathians Protected Landscape Area
