= Hundsheimer Berg (nature reserve) =

Nature reserve in Austria

Coordinates: 48.124091°N 16.936238°E

- IUCN category IV (habitat/species management area)
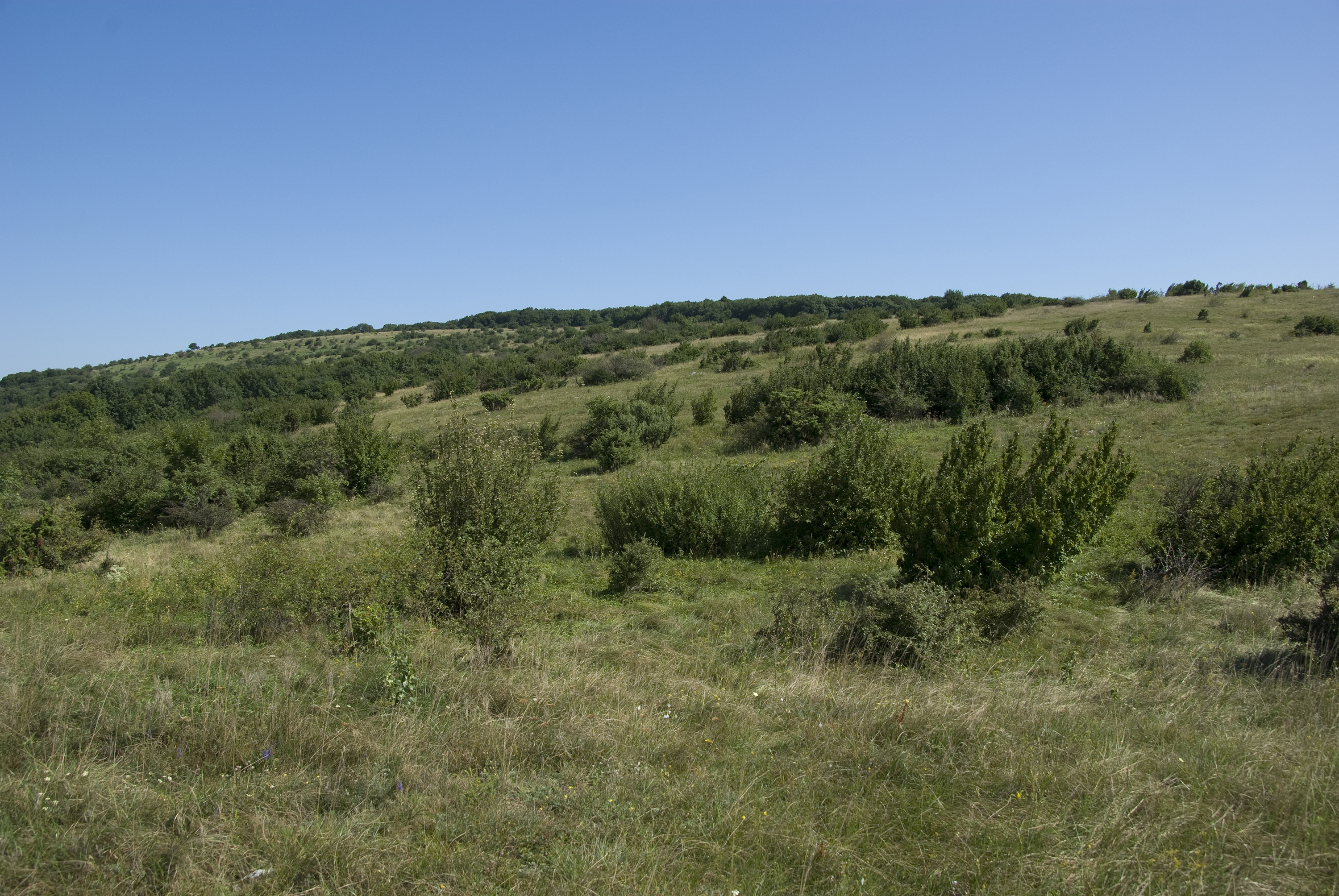
- Interactive map of Hundsheimer Berg
- Area: 1,66 km2
- Established: 1965

Hundsheimer Berg is a nature reserve in the Austrian municipalities of Hundsheim and Hainburg an der Donau in the province of Lower Austria located on the slopes of the Hundsheimer Berg. Half of the reserve is owned by WWF Austria with the other half being owned by the municipality of Hundsheim. The Hundsheimer Berg is for example used for excursions by the University of Vienna.

== Description ==
The Hundsheimer Berge form an island in the flat agricultural landscape of Lower Austria. The slopes of the hill are covered with extensive rock steppes, dry and semi-dry grasslands, hedges and dry forests. In many regions the area of these biotopes had decreased drastically over the 20th century. To protect this characteristic landscape the Hundsheimer Berg nature reserve was created in 1965.

== Geology ==
Geologically the Hundsheimer Berge are, although separated from it by the Danube, the most western part of the Little Carpathians and the whole Carpathian mountain range. This way, the Hundsheimer Berge form the connection with the Alps that are located further to the south-west. The core of the hills consists of old rocks, mainly granite and crystalline slate. These last ones together with Early Triassic quartzite form the eastern foot of the Hundsheimer Berge. The majority of the hills is formed by limestone and dolomite from the Middle Triassic. These rocks that are prone to karst influences, in combination with the very thin humus layer, create a very dry environment on the steep slopes of the Hundsheimer Berge. On these slopes as well as on the foot of the hill also neogene and Quaternary sediments like loess can be found.

== Fauna ==
Approximately 1350 species of Micro- and Macrolepidoptera have been found in the Hundsheimer Berg nature reserve. Of these, 35 species have developed in or in the surroundings of the nature reserve. The remaining 1315 species represent almost 40% of the total butterfly and moth fauna of Lower Austria. In total 110 species have a high conservation value for Central Europe. Species include Ypsolopha sequella and Scarce swallowtail. Other notable animals are Saga pedo, European ground squirrel, Setina roscida and species of Megachile.
