= Devín Gate =

Coordinates: 48°10′30.29″N 16°58′42.96″E

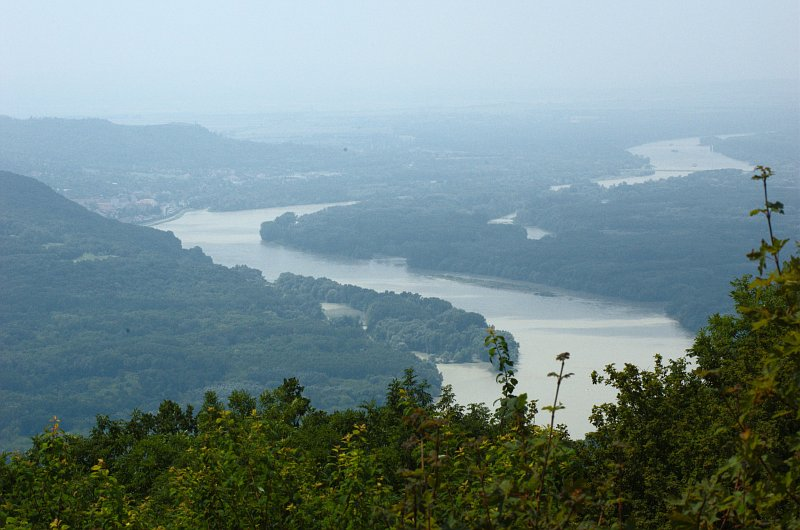
Devín Gate

Devín Gate, Hainburger Gate or Hungarian Gates (Slovak: Devínska brána, pronounced [ˈɟeʋiːnska ˈbraːna]; German: Hainburger Pforte) is a natural gate in the Danube valley at the border of Slovakia and Austria. It is one out of four geomorphological areas of the Devín Carpathians, part of the Little Carpathians mountain range. Passau, Devín Gate, and the Iron Gates divide the Danube river into four distinct sections.

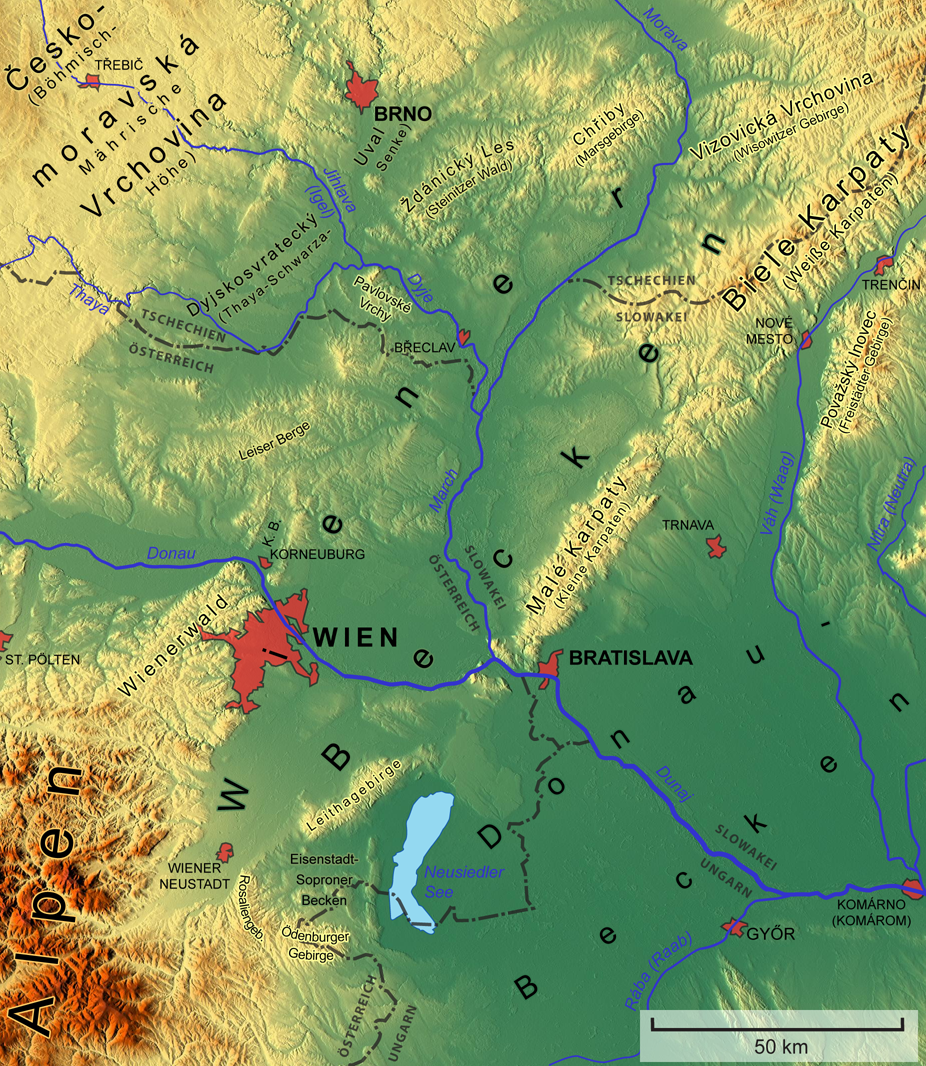
The Vienna Basin and the Little Carpathians, including the Devín Carpathians, with the Devín Gate

Devín Gate has been inhabited since prehistoric times, with continuous settlement since 5000 BC. It was a strategic part of the ancient Amber Road connecting Northern Europe with the Mediterranean and during the Middle Ages, five castles have been built here, Heimenburg Castle, Rothelstein Castle, Pottenburg Castle, Devín Castle, and Bratislava Castle. It was continually guarded since Roman times and it has served as a border of the Roman Empire, Austrian Empire, the Iron Curtain during the Cold War and finally a border between Austria and Czechoslovakia, today Slovakia. On 1 May 2004 Slovakia entered the Schengen Zone, allowing free movement of persons.

== Name ==
Formerly, the gate was called in Latin: Porta Hungarica and in Hungarian: Dévényi kapu.

== Location and description ==
In a wider sense it begins below Bratislava Castle (in which case the gate is 11.5 km long and 2 to 7 km wide) and in a narrower sense it begins below Devín Castle. It ends near Hundsheimer Berg, the highest peak of the Austrian Carpathians at 480 meters AMSL, in Austria on the right bank of the Danube. To the east, it borders another natural gate, the Lamač Gate.

Geologically, Devín Gate was created during the Pleistocene epoch. A large part of its core consists of granite massifs from the Carboniferous period. It also features limestones and dolomites from the Cenozoic era. Neogene period sediments include conglomerates, gravels and others. On the Upper Danube, comprising the section between the springs where the river begins and Devín Gate upstream of Bratislava, the extension of the morphological floodplain is smaller as compared to the rest of the river.

== History ==
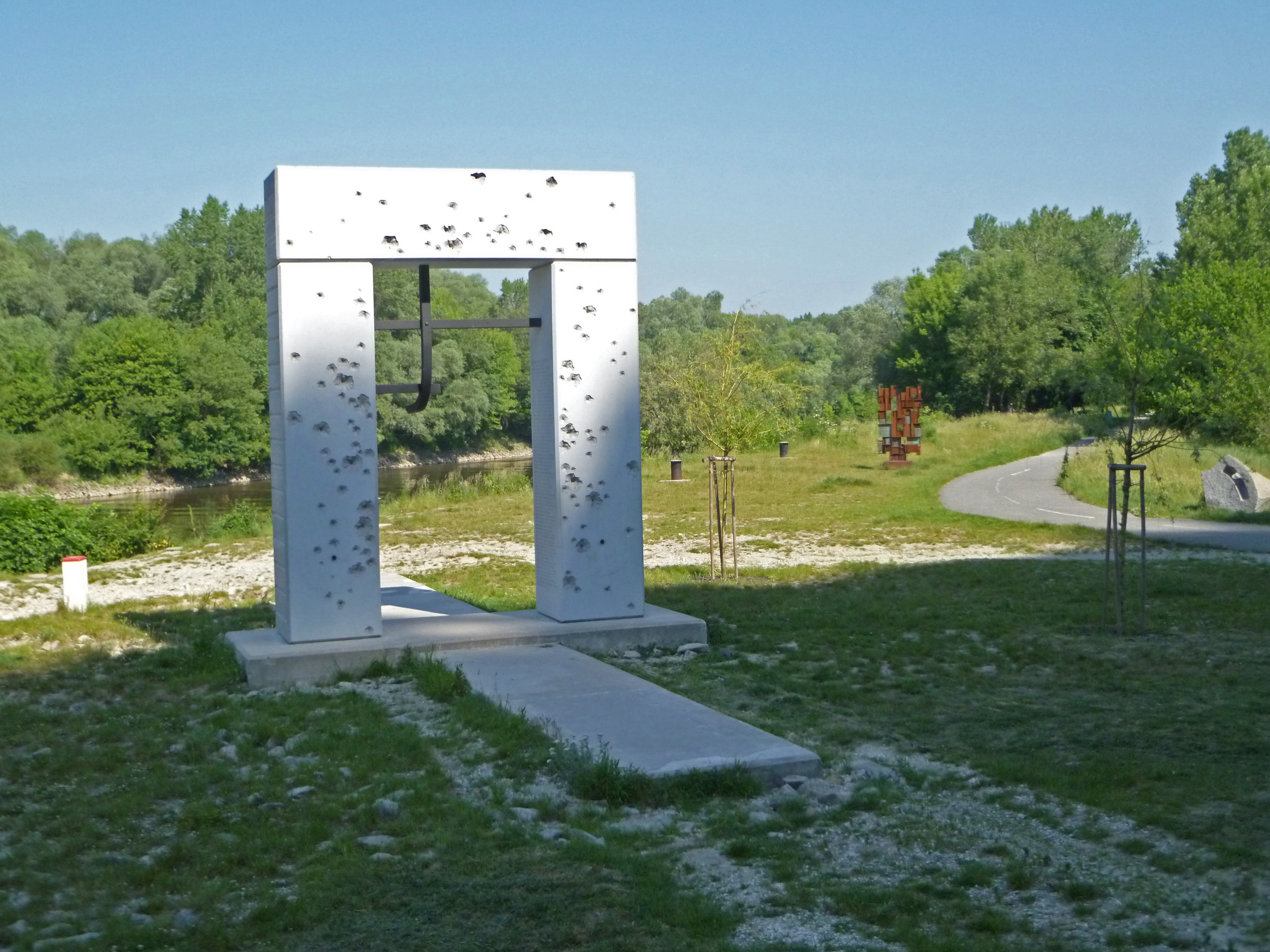
Memorial for the 400 men and women who were shot trying to escape to Austria during the Cold War

dubious

Neolithic farmers settled in the area approximately 5000 - 3500 BC, establishing continuous human settlement which lasts until present time.

== See also ==
- Geography of Bratislava
