= Teichberg =

Teichberg may refer to:

- Elliot Tiber (born Eliyahu Teichberg, 1935–2016), artist and screenwriter, author of Taking Woodstock
- Ignatius Teichberg (1923–2006), stock broker, investment analyst, and financial columnist known as Igo
- Teichberg, a 321m peak in the Hundsheimer Berge, Austria
