= Lipót (given name) =

- Gender: Male
- Name day: 15 November

Origin
- Region of origin: Hungary

Other names
- Related names: Leopold,

Lipót is a Hungarian masculine given name, a cognate of the English language name Leopold.

Individuals with the name Lipót include:

- Lipót Baumhorn (1860–1932), Hungarian architect
- Lipót Fejér (1880–1959), Hungarian mathematician
- Lipót Hertzka (1904–1951), Hungarian football player and manager
- Lipót Kállai (1912–1989), Hungarian footballer
- Lipót Klug (1854–1945), Hungarian mathematician
- Lipót Kollonich (1631–1707), Hungarian cardinal of the Holy Roman Church, Archbishop and Primate of Hungary
- Lipót Pálffy de Erdőd (1764–1825), Hungarian Count and military officer
- Lipót Schulhof (1847–1921), Hungarian astronomer
