= Bratislava Foothills =

Mountain range in Bratislava

Coordinates: 48.2°N 17°E

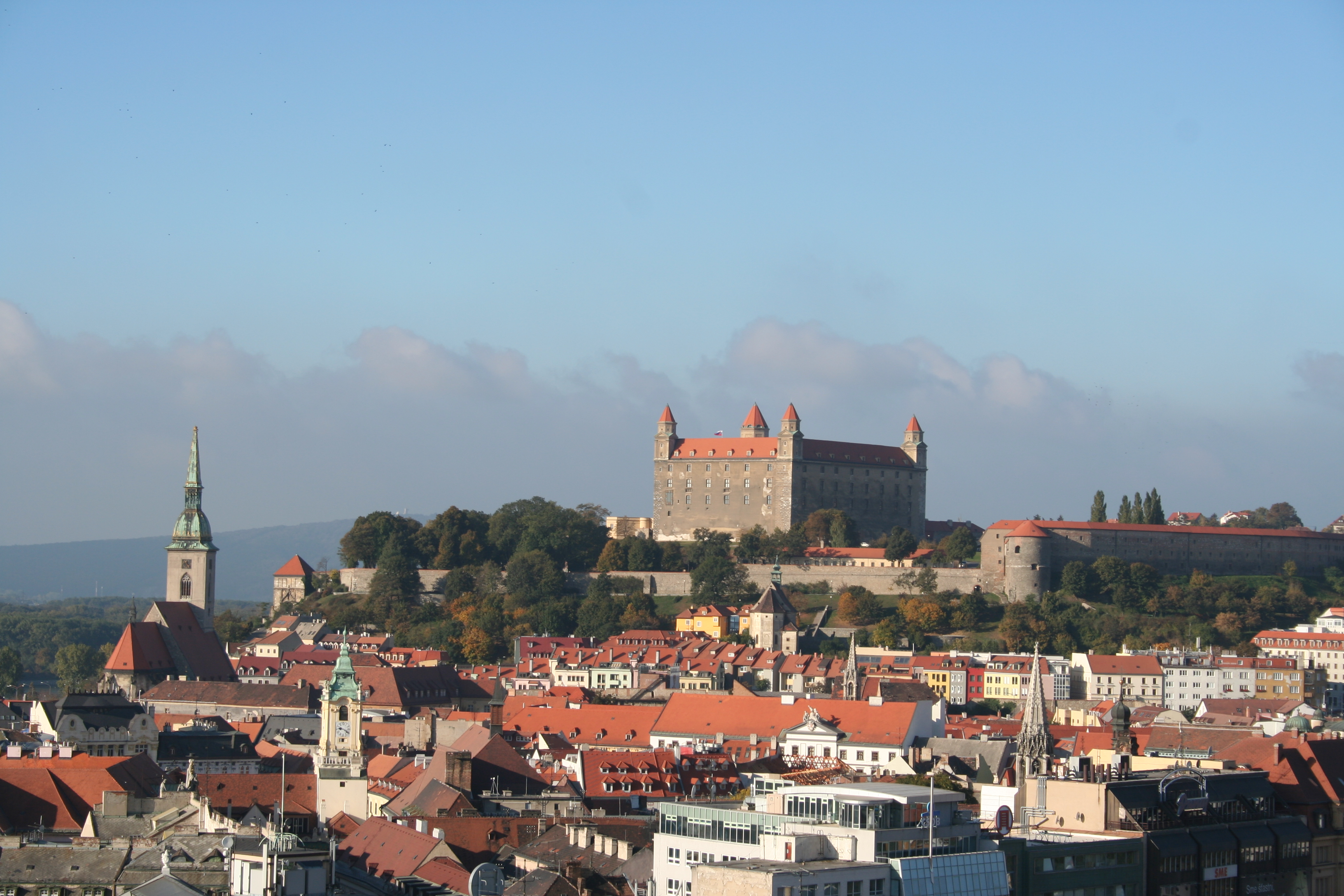
Bratislava Castle hill

Bratislava Foothills (Slovak: Bratislavské predhorie) is a small mountain range located in Bratislava, the capital of Slovakia. It is part of the Devín Carpathians mountain range, located in the northwest of the city. Mean altitude of the mountain range is 250 metres above sea level.

== Peaks ==
- Bratislava Castle hill - features the Bratislava Castle
- Somársky vrch
  - Napoleon's hill
- Bôrik - features the Bôrik Protected Area
- Slavín - features the Slavín war memorial
- Murmannova výšina
- Kalvária
- Holý vrch/Machnáč

== See also ==
- Geography of Bratislava
- Little Carpathians
