= Hundsheimer Berg =

Hill in Austria

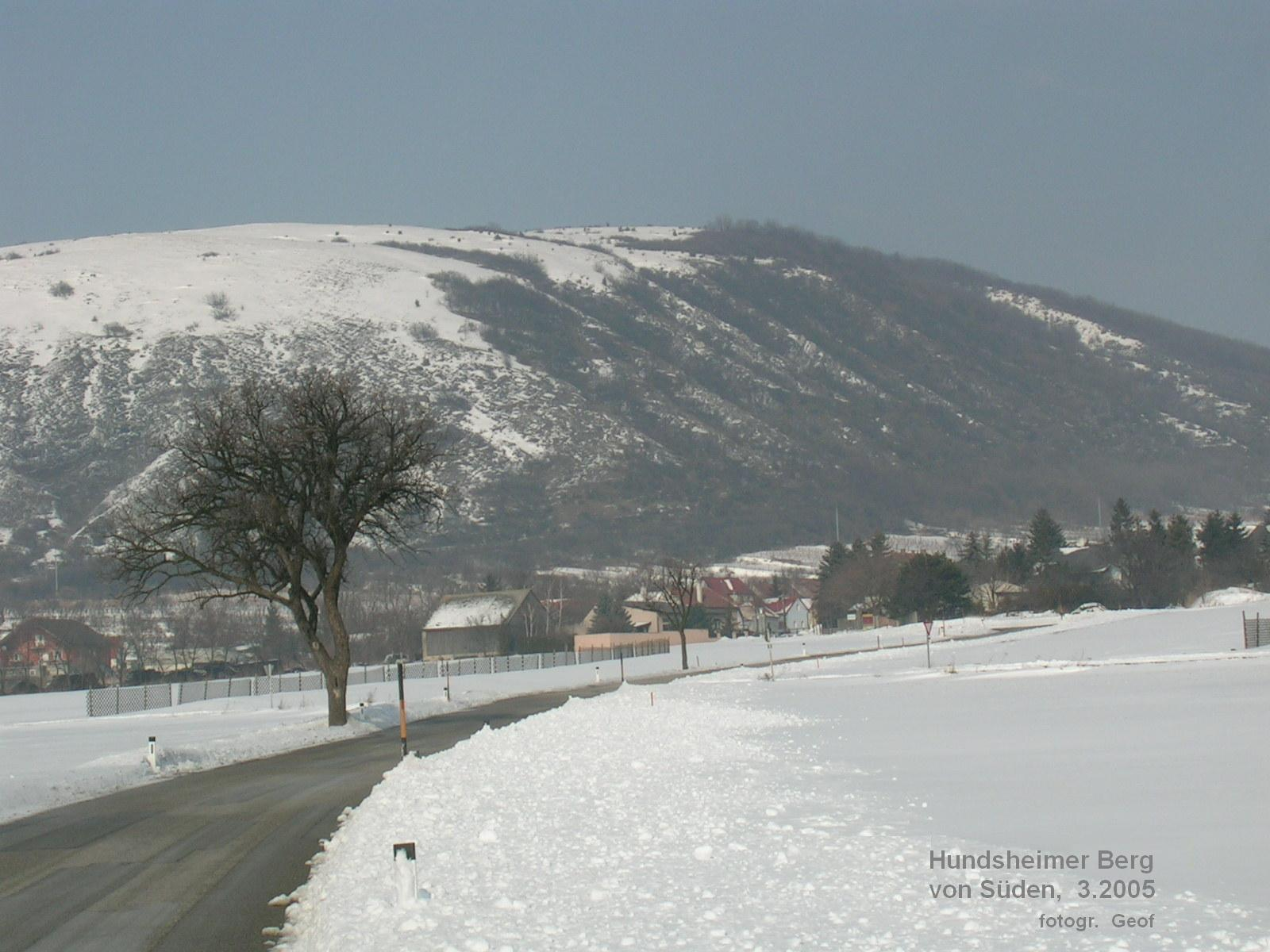
- Hundsheimer Berg seen from the south

Highest point
- Elevation: 481 m (1,578 ft)
- Coordinates: 48°07′57″N 16°56′18″E

Geography
- Location: Hundsheim, Austria
- Parent range: Little Carpathians

Hundsheimer Berg is a hill located in the Hundsheimer Berge hill range in Lower Austria, Austria close to the border with Slovakia. Its peak is 481 metres (1,578 ft) above sea level which makes it the highest hill in the Hundsheimer Berge. The north slopes of the Hundsheimer Berg are covered with forests while the southern slopes have a steppe vegetation. Since 1965, a nature reserve with the same name, Hundsheimer Berg, is located on these southern slopes.
