= Lipót Pálffy de Erdőd =

Count Lipót (Leopold) Pálffy de Erdőd (1764–1825) was the Count of Pozsony County and the Major General, who after the destruction of Dévény Castle negotiated with Napoleon I.
