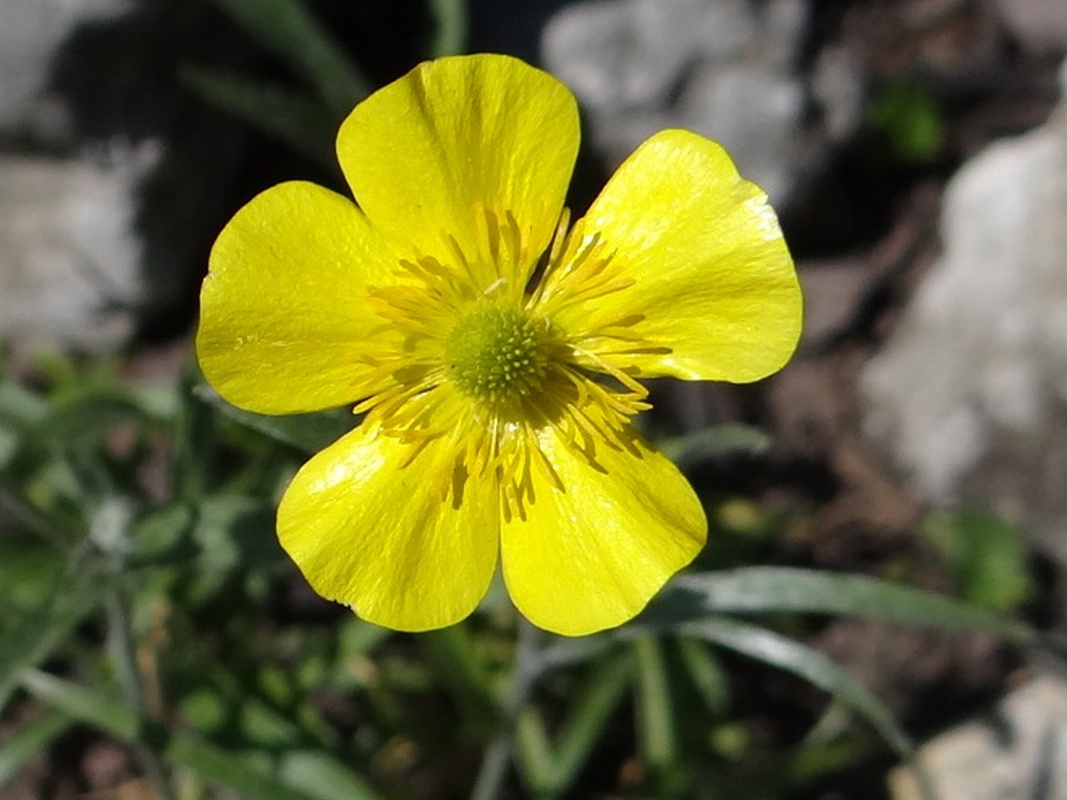

Scientific classification
- Kingdom: Plantae
- Clade: Tracheophytes
- Clade: Angiosperms
- Clade: Eudicots
- Order: Ranunculales
- Family: Ranunculaceae
- Genus: Ranunculus
- Species: R. illyricus

Binomial name
- Ranunculus illyricus L.

= Ranunculus illyricus =

Species of herb

Ranunculus illyricus is a protected plant in Hungary of the family of Ranunculaceae. This perennial herb can be found in pastures and grasslands and is usually 15 to 30 cm tall. It has white hairs. The stems leaves are tri-composite, and the flower petals are yellow and roundish. The cup of the flower bends back at time of flowering, blooming in May and June.
