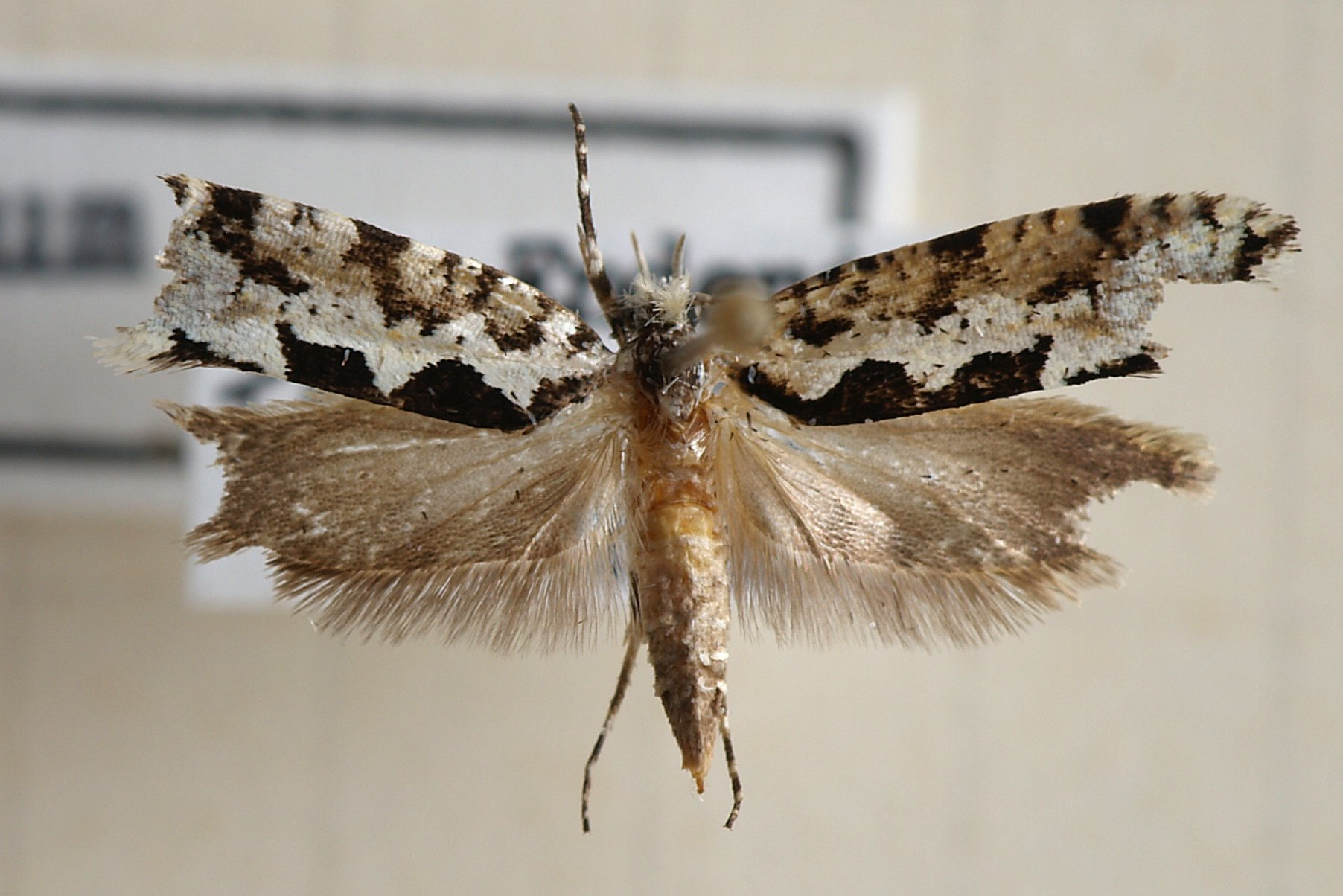
- Mounted
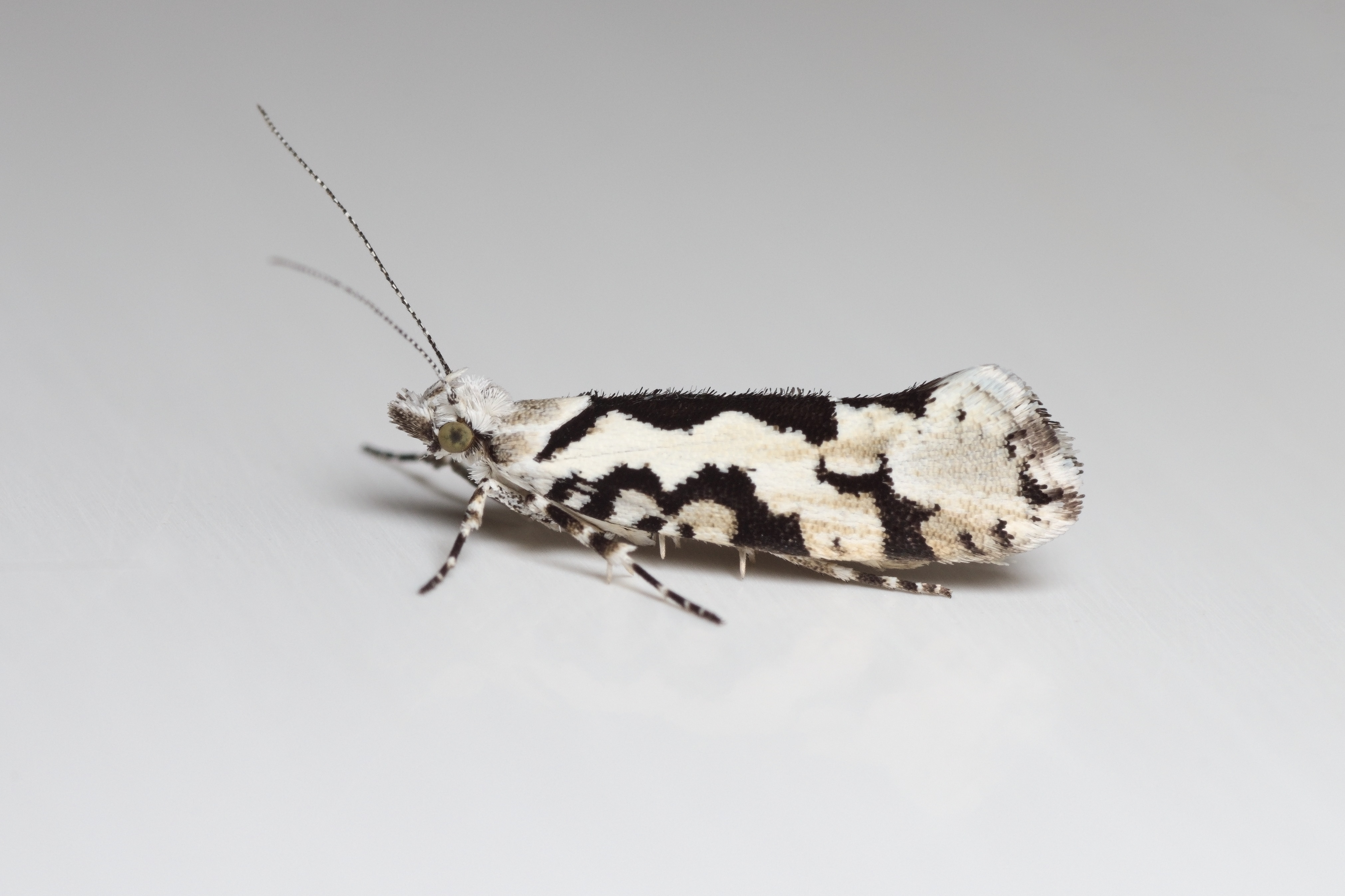

Scientific classification
- Kingdom: Animalia
- Phylum: Arthropoda
- Clade: Pancrustacea
- Class: Insecta
- Order: Lepidoptera
- Family: Ypsolophidae
- Genus: Ypsolopha
- Species: Y. sequella

Binomial name
- Ypsolopha sequella Clerck, 1759

= Ypsolopha sequella =

Species of moth

Ypsolopha sequella is a moth of the family Ypsolophidae. It is found in Europe and Anatolia.

The wingspan is 18–20 mm. The moth flies from July to September depending on the location.

The larvae feed on maple trees.
