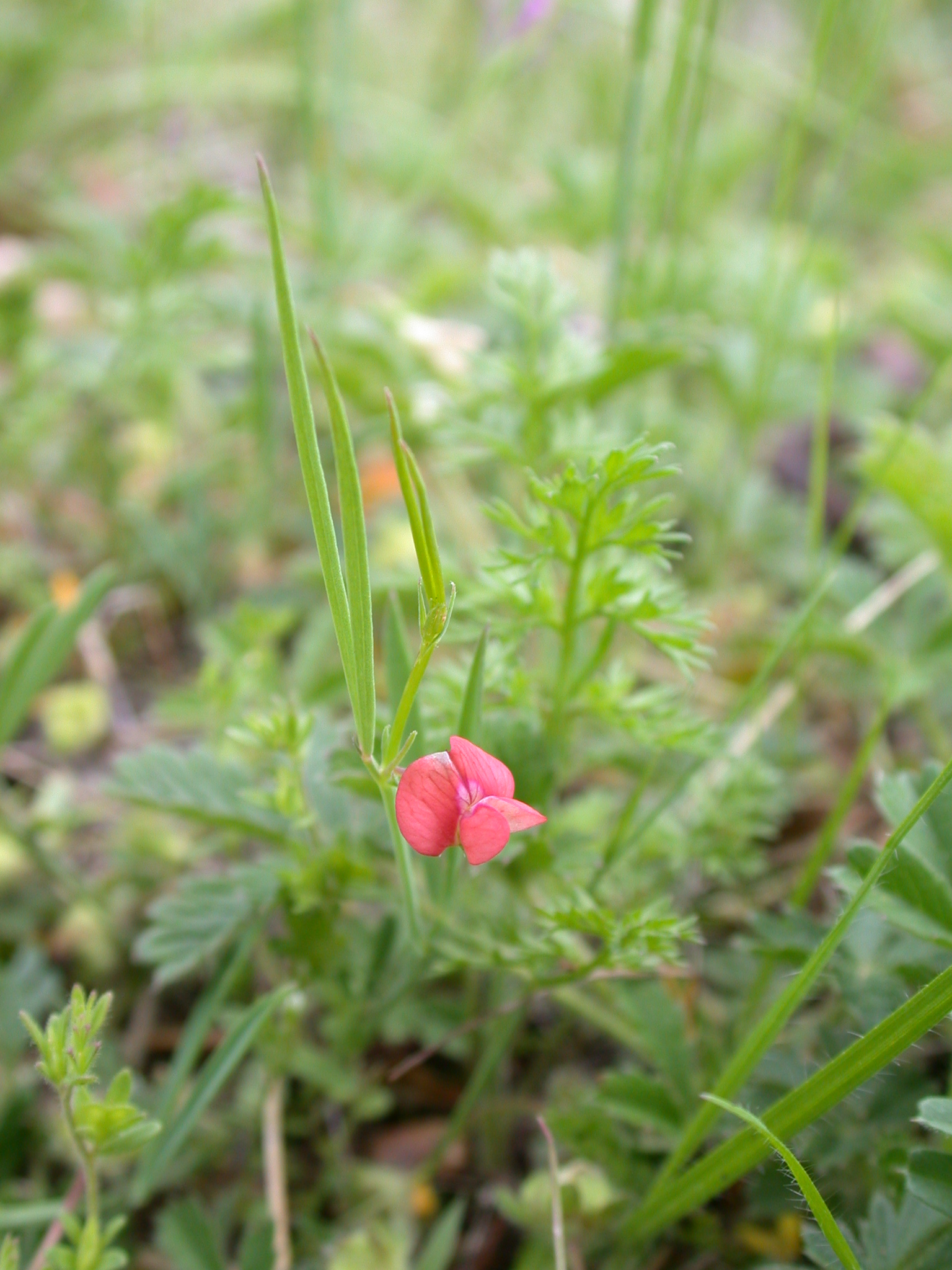

Scientific classification
- Kingdom: Plantae
- Clade: Tracheophytes
- Clade: Angiosperms
- Clade: Eudicots
- Clade: Rosids
- Order: Fabales
- Family: Fabaceae
- Subfamily: Faboideae
- Genus: Lathyrus
- Species: L. sphaericus

Binomial name
- Lathyrus sphaericus Retz.

= Lathyrus sphaericus =

Species of legume

Lathyrus sphaericus, commonly known as grass pea and round-seeded vetchling, is a species of annual flowering plant in the legume family (Fabaceae). It typically grows to between 15 and 30 centimetres tall and bears distinctive brick-red flowers. The species is native primarily to Mediterranean and sub-Mediterranean regions, ranging widely from southern Europe and North Africa to Western Asia. It favours dry, nutrient-rich soils and is commonly found in disturbed habitats, including roadsides, vineyards, fields, and pasturelands. Recently rediscovered in Slovakia after a lengthy absence, it is considered critically endangered there, reflecting ongoing changes in its distribution likely influenced by climate warming.

== Description ==
Lathyrus sphaericus is an annual herbaceous plant typically reaching heights of 15–30 cm. Its stems grow upright or occasionally ascend, and both the stems and leaf stalks (petioles) have few or no wing-like extensions. The leaves consist of a single pair of leaflets, each leaflet measuring between 2 and 8 cm long, and are hairless (glabrous). These leaflets are linear to lance-shaped, with parallel veins running their length. The lower leaves generally end in a sharp, bristle-like tip, while the upper leaves terminate in a simple, undivided tendril that aids in climbing.

Small, narrow stipules (leafy appendages at the base of the leaf stalk) are present, shaped somewhat like arrowheads (sagittate). Each flower stalk (peduncle) carries only one flower and is distinctly elongated, appearing to continue past the flower itself due to a small bract (bracteole). The calyx (the collective term for the sepals surrounding the flower) is hairless, and its teeth—short, pointed structures at the top—are roughly equal in length and only slightly longer than the tubular base.

The flowers are brick-red and about 10 mm in length. Following flowering, the plant produces flat, smooth, hairless seed pods measuring between 4 and 6 mm. These pods contain spherical, smooth seeds about 4–5 mm across, from which the species gets its name. Flowering typically occurs in May. The plant has a chromosome count of 2n=14.

In appearance, Lathyrus sphaericus resembles several other species, particularly Lathyrus cicera, which differs by having calyx teeth 1.5 to 3 times longer than the calyx tube and larger, angular seeds. Two other similar species, Lathyrus setifolius and Lathyrus angulatus, are not found in Switzerland, further assisting identification within its native range.

== Habitat and distribution ==
Lathyrus sphaericus typically grows in warm, moderately sunny locations. It favours loamy-clay soils, which can be unstable at times, and are either calcareous (containing calcium carbonate) or non-calcareous but generally nutrient-rich and dry. The species is often short-lived and opportunistic, commonly found along roadsides, in disturbed areas, vineyards, waste grounds, fields, fallow lands, and extensively grazed sheep pastures. It can also grow at the edges of dry oak forests and shrubby areas, as well as in dry, patchy grasslands. In Switzerland, its elevational range extends from about 380 to 1030 metres, while in Italy it occurs from sea level up to 1200 metres.

The species occupies a wide ecological range. Naturally occurring habitats include specific grassland communities such as Festucetalia vallesiacae and Sedo-Scleranthetalia, along with associations like Jasione-Brometum and Geranion sanguinei. It can even appear in recently abandoned cereal fields, steppe fragments amidst vineyard areas, and various roadside and ruderal (disturbed) plant communities.

Lathyrus sphaericus is primarily distributed across Mediterranean and sub-Mediterranean regions, from the Iberian Peninsula in the west through to the Balkans in the east. The northern boundary of its range roughly follows the Loire Valley in France, across the southern fringes of the Alps in Switzerland and Italy, extending further east to the Hungarian basin along the Danube River and into Crimea. Additional populations exist on Rhodes (Greece), the Caucasus region, North Africa, and Madeira. Occasional, transient appearances have been recorded further north in southern Germany, on the Danish island of Bornholm, and even as far north as Sweden.

In 2020, Lathyrus sphaericus was rediscovered in Slovakia after having been considered regionally extinct for over 90 years. A population was found on the dry, rocky slopes of Kusá hora hill near Kozárovce, in the southern part of the Štiavnické vrchy Mountains of southwestern Slovakia. This site features species-rich, dry grassland typical of warm habitats on volcanic bedrock. Due to this rediscovery, the species' status in Slovakia was updated from regionally extinct to critically endangered. Its recent appearance in Slovakia follows similar records in nearby northern Hungary, suggesting that climate change and warmer conditions may facilitate further northward expansion of this Mediterranean plant.

== Gallery ==
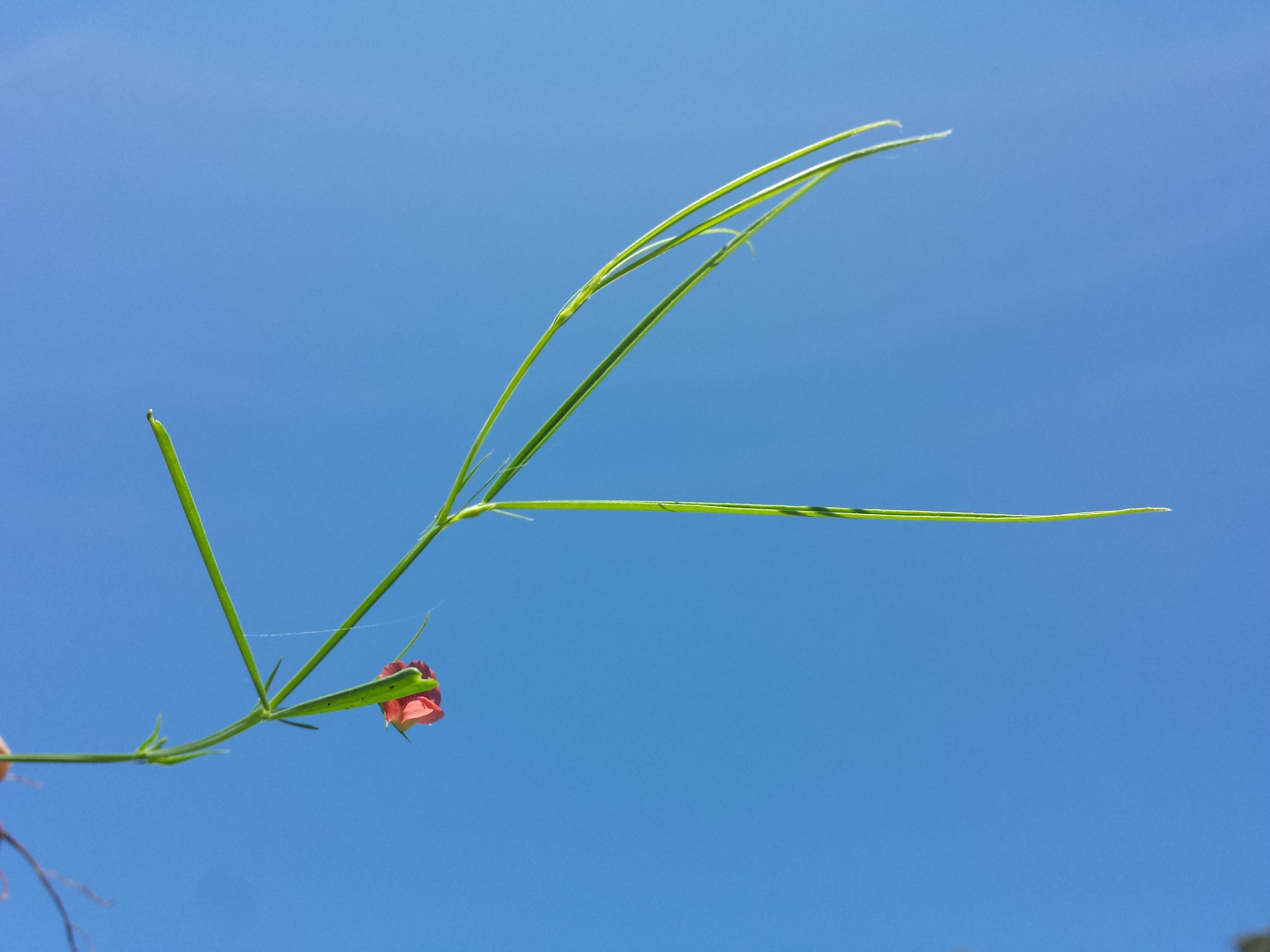
Habit

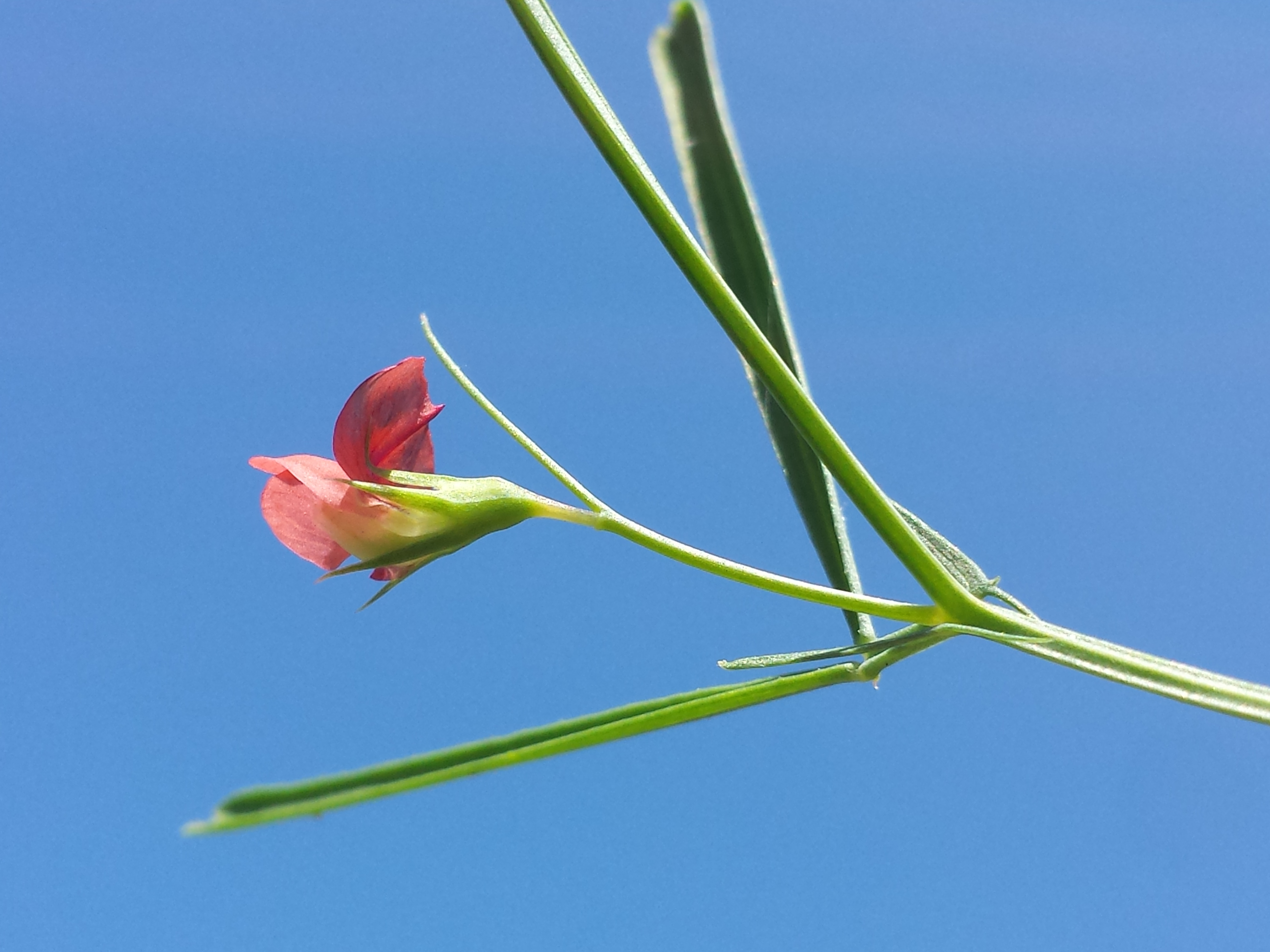
Flower
