= Devín Castle =

Castle ruins in Bratislava, Slovakia

Coordinates: 48°10′25″N 16°58′42″E

Devín Castle Devínsky hrad
- Bratislava Devín; Slovakia
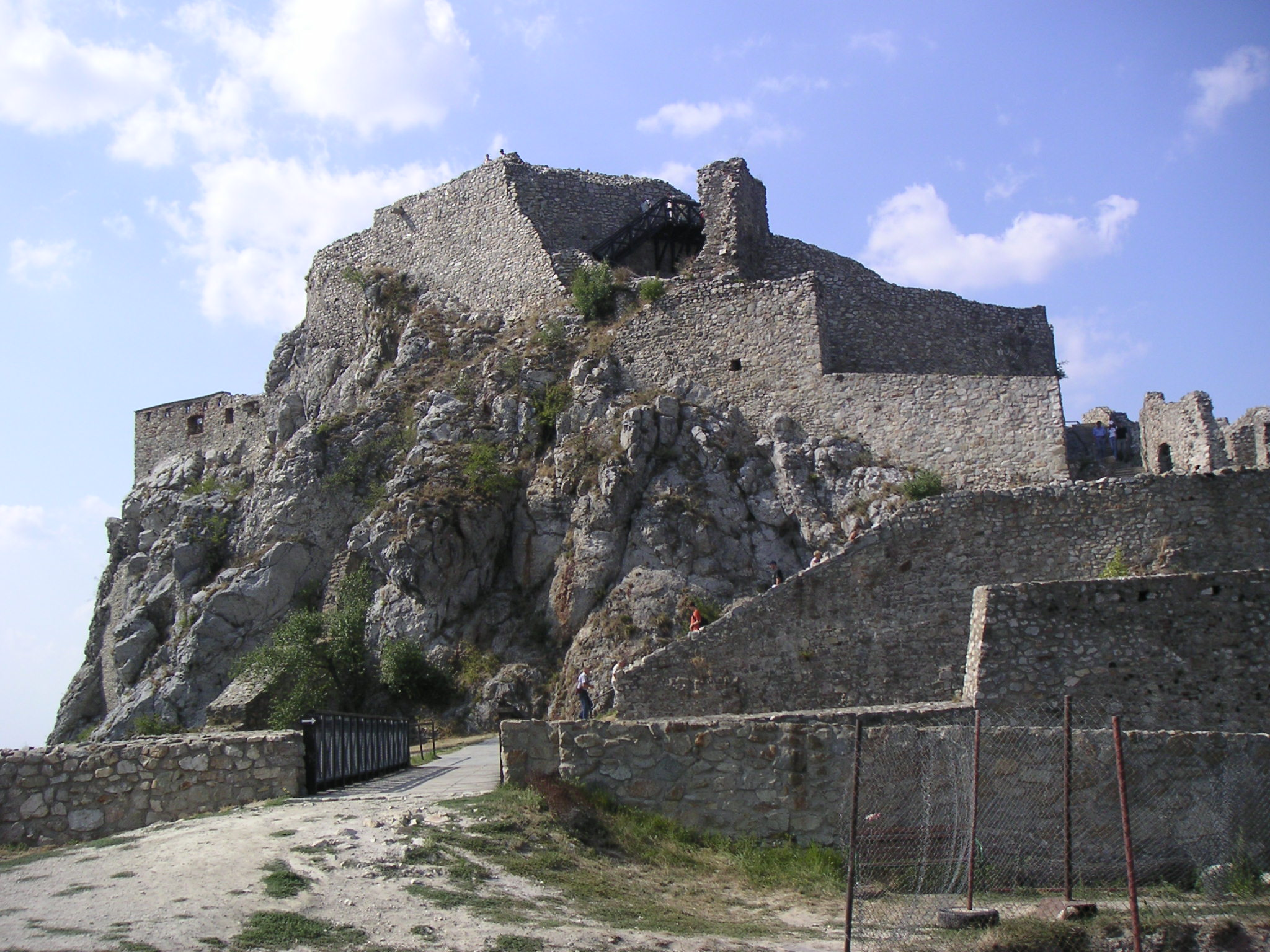
- The ruins of Devín Castle

Site information
- Type: Castle
- Controlled by: Great Moravia, Kingdom of Hungary, Czechoslovakia, Nazi Germany, Slovakia
- Open to the public: nonstop, opening hours apply to the museum
- Condition: Ruins (partially reconstructed)

Site history
- Built: 864 – 15th century Last fortifications were built in the 17th century
- Events: Notable events in the castle's life: Blown-up during the Napoleonic Wars in 1809

Devín Castle (Slovak: hrad Devín [ˈɦrad ˈɟeʋiːn] or Devínsky hrad [ˈɟeʋiːnski ˈɦrat], Hungarian: Dévényi vár, German: Burg Theben) is a castle in Devín, which is a borough of Bratislava, the capital of Slovakia.

== Description ==
The site has been settled since the Neolithic Age and fortified since the Bronze and Iron Age and later by Celts and Romans.

The cliff (elevation 212 meters) is an ideal place for a fort due to its position at the confluence of the Danube and Morava rivers. The fort watches over an important trade route along the Danube as well as one branch of the Amber Road.

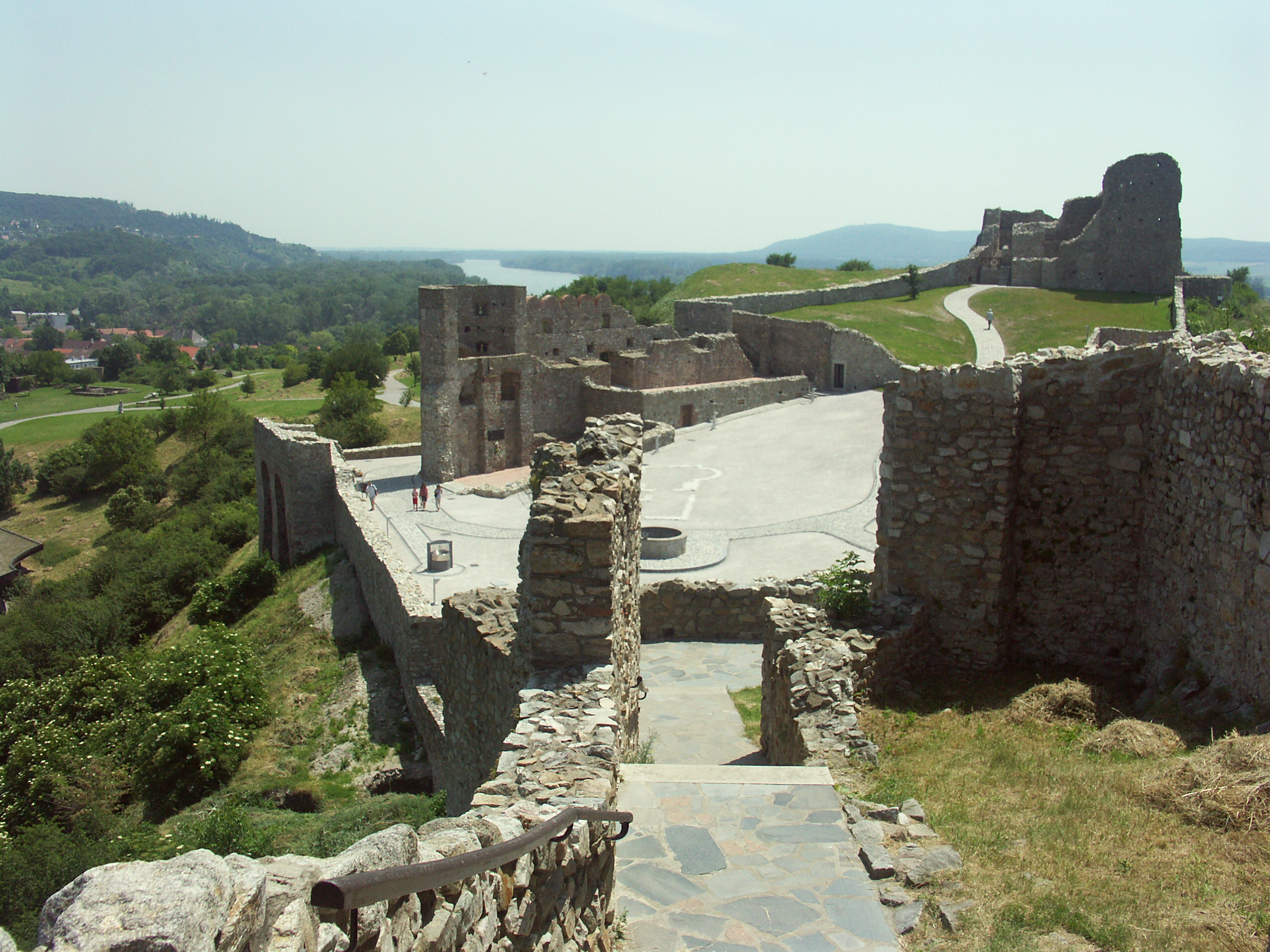
Devín Castle

The castle stands just inside Slovak territory on the frontier between Slovakia and Austria. The border runs from west to east along the Morava River and subsequently the Danube. Before 1989, the Iron Curtain between the Eastern Bloc and the West ran just in front of the castle. Although the castle was open to the public, the area surrounding it constituted a restricted military zone and was heavily fortified with watchtowers and barbed wire. After the Velvet Revolution, the area was demilitarised.

The most photographed part of the castle is the tiny watchtower, known as the Maiden Tower. Separated from the main castle, it balances perilously on a lone rock and has spawned countless legends concerning imprisoned lovelorn daughters leaping to their deaths.

Inside the castle is a sprawling landscape of walls, staircases, open courtyards, and gardens in various states of disrepair. A restoration project has been taking place since the end of World War II.

== Etymology ==
The name of the castle is probably derived from the old Indo-European/Proto-Slavic stem *deiv- with apophony *doiv- related to light and visual perception. Devín, Divín, Devinka, Divino, Dzivín, and similar Slavic names can be interpreted as watchtowers or observation points. The same root related to vision can be found also in the word div (evil spirit) thus meaning "the place of evil spirits". The Annales Fuldenses explained the name from the Slavic word deva—a girl ("Dowina, id est puella"). In this case, devin grad means "castle of the girl" (according to linguist Šimon Ondruš, this etymology is less likely).

== History ==
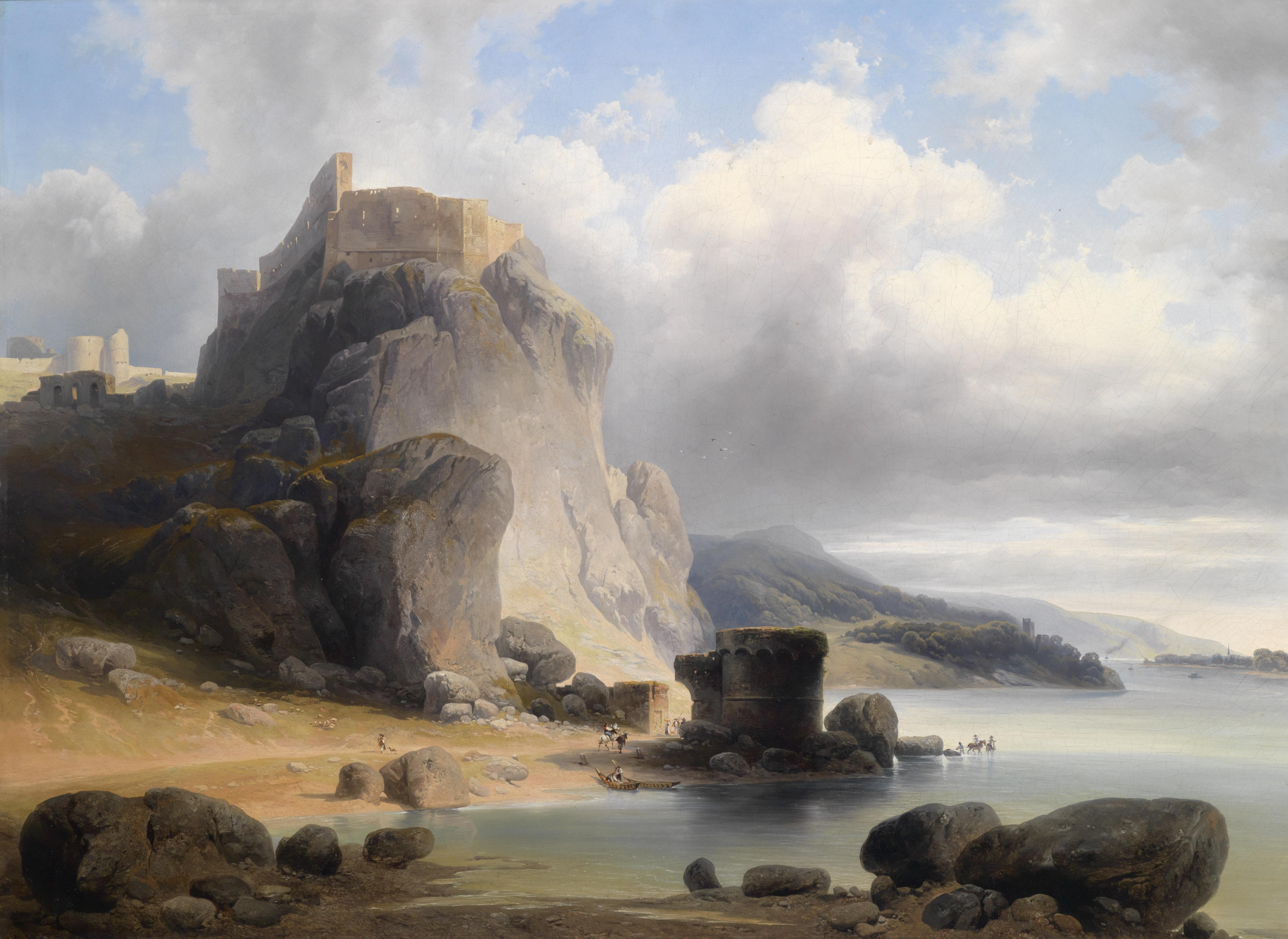
Devin Castle in 1864

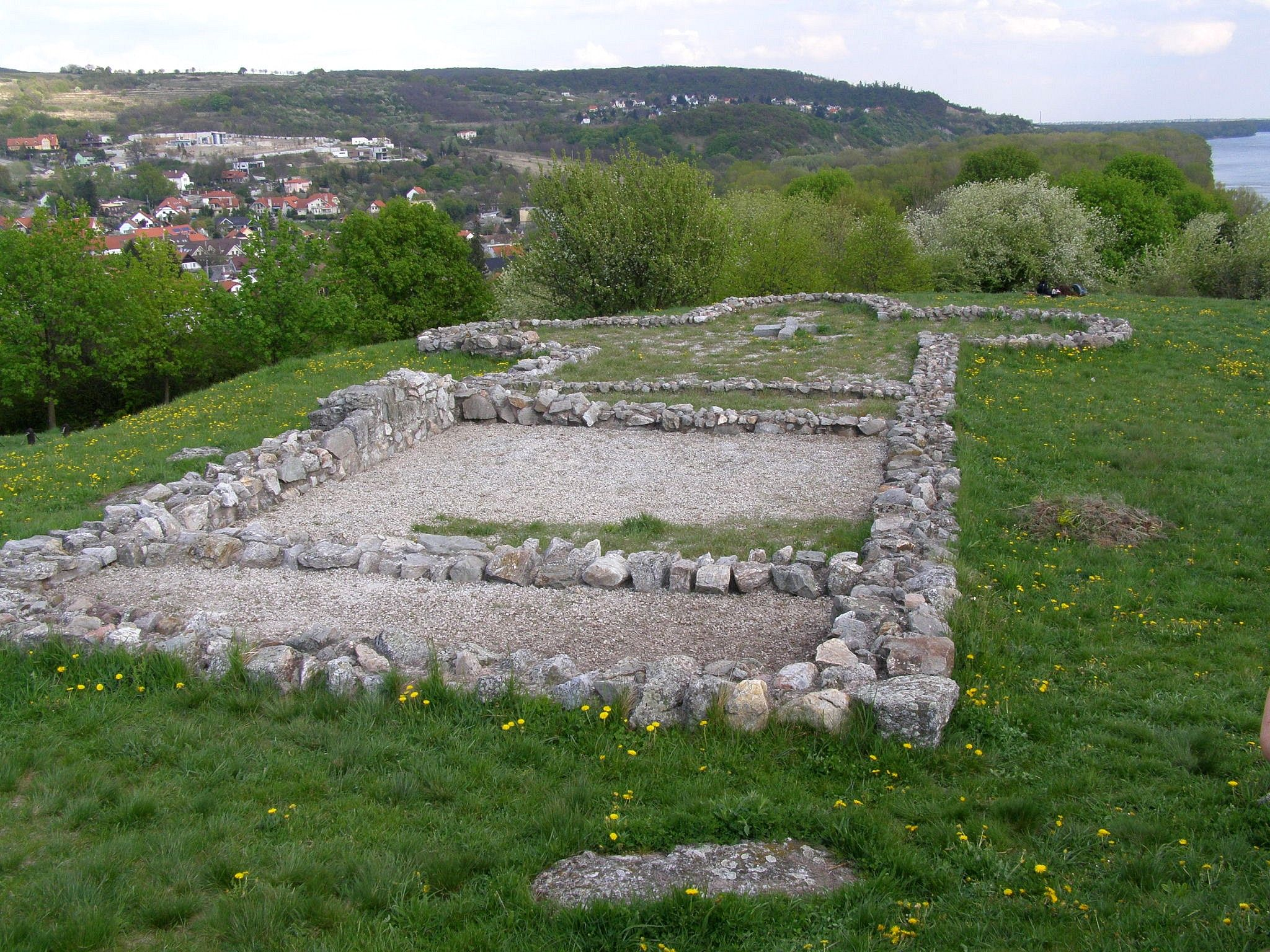

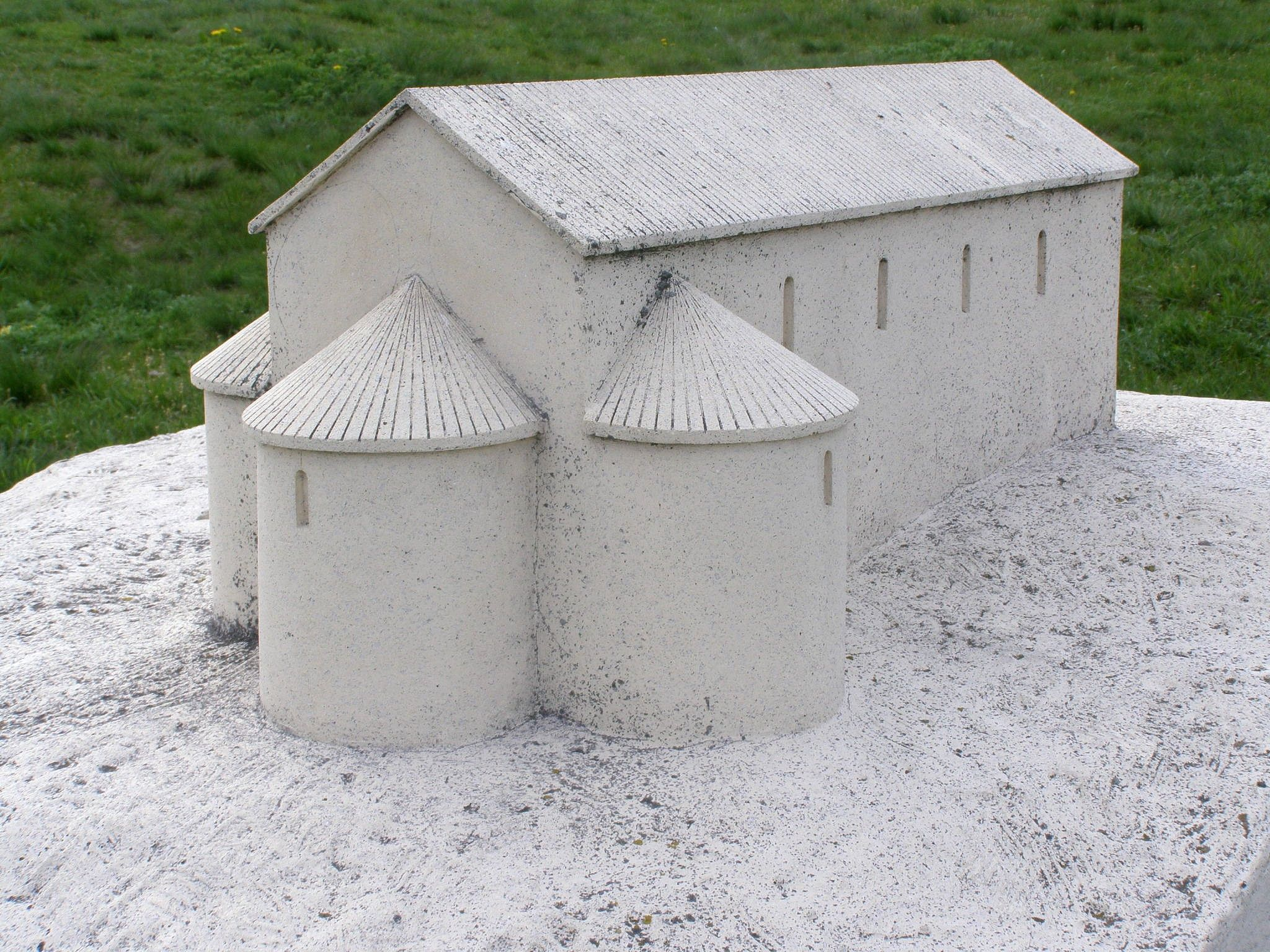
The Great Moravian church at the castle and its potential reconstruction

Devín Castle is one of the oldest castles in Slovakia. The first mention of the castle in written sources was quite possibly in 864, when Louis the German besieged Prince Rastislav of Moravia in one of the frequent wars between the Franks and Great Moravia respectively in the "castle of Dowina". On the other hand, the identification of Dowina with Devín Castle has been under debate based on alleged linguistic arguments and the absence of convincing archaeologic evidence.

During the Great Moravian period, Devín was the center of a larger agglomeration. Its defensive role was strengthened by smaller hill forts on Devínska Kobyla (Na pieskach, Nad lomom). A pre-romanesque church was built on the castle between approximately 850 and 863/870. Its rare style is closest to churches from Dalmatia and Noricum, from the areas with a persisting tradition of late antique and Byzantine architecture. The interior of the church was decorated with frescoes painted with colors that originated (according to chemical analysis) in northern Italy. Two styluses discovered by later research can indicate the administrative educational work of the local priests. Along with other artifacts, six graves dated to the Great Moravian era were found near the church and are attributed to members of a retinue of the local ruler and their family members.

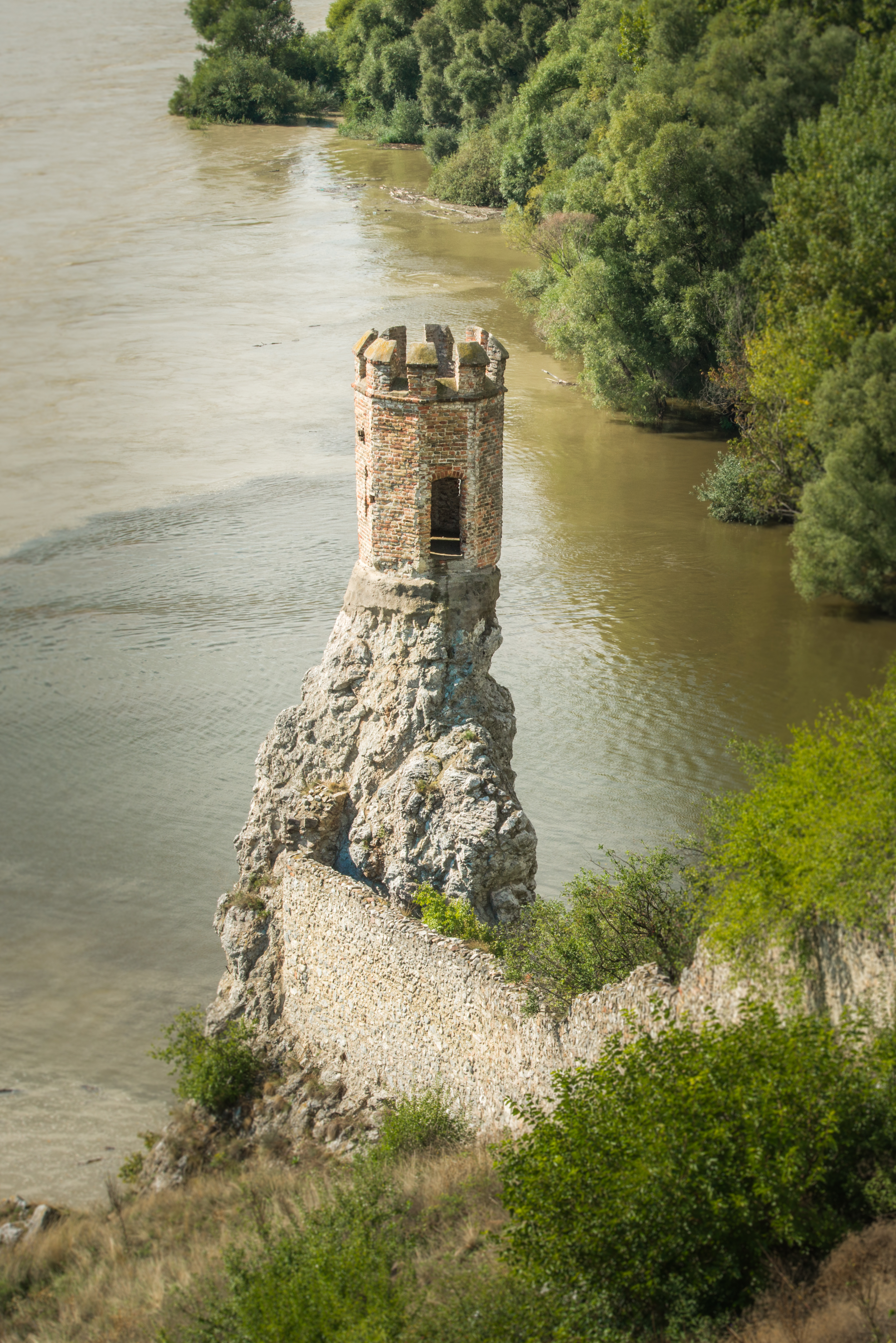
View of the Maiden Tower above the confluence of the Danube and Morava rivers

In the 13th century, a stone castle was built to protect the western frontier of the Hungarian Kingdom whose existence was documented in 1271, and a reference to a castelanus de Devin appeared in 1326.

The palace was added in the 15th century. The fortifications were reinforced during the wars against the Ottoman Empire. The Castle was never taken, but after the Hungarian Kingdom joined the Habsburg monarchy and the Ottomans were finally defeated, it ceased to be an important border fortress and was no longer used by the military. Stephen Báthory got the castle from the king as a donation. But according to Stephen Báthory was Keglević the owner of the castle. Keglević pawned the castle for 40,000 guilders to the Palocsai family and spent the money. In 1609, Matthias II confirmed that Keglević still was the owner of the castle, but Keglević did not have the money to take the castle out of pledge from the Palocsai family. Nearly 100 years later in 1635, Palatine Pál Pálffy took the castle out of pledge from the Palocsai family. The last owners of the Devín Castle were the Counts of the Pálffy family. Only in 1809, after the Siege of Pressburg, was the castle (which may have still been considered a threat) destroyed by the retreating forces of Napoleon I of France. Napoleon and Leopold Pálffy then entered negotiations and both agreed that Vienna should be supplied with products by Pálffy. The Pálffy family sold the ruins to the state in 1932.

Since the 19th century as its history inspired several Romantic poets and followers of Ľudovít Štúr, Devín became an important national symbol for the Slovaks. It featured both on the reverse of the former 500 Czechoslovak koruna banknote and the 50 halier coin of the Slovak currency.

The Hungarians regarded it as the western gateway of the Kingdom of Hungary. The Hungarian poet Endre Ady used it as a symbol of modernism and Westernization in his poem I am the Son of Gog and Magog:

By Verecke's ancient route I came,
In my ear ancient Magyar songs still blaze,
Am I free to break through at Dévény,
With modern songs fit for modern days?

— Endre Ady: I am the Son of Gog and Magog

During the Czechoslovak Socialist Republic communist dictatorship, the castle was within the border zone of the Iron Curtain which prevented people from escaping the country.

Some parts of the castle were reconstructed in the 20th century, and the most recent improvements for visitors were completed in 2023. The castle hosts an interesting museum. Archaeological works at the site have revealed the remains of a Roman tower dating from the 1st century AD and evidence of a prehistoric settlement.

== See also ==
- History of Bratislava
- Tourism in Slovakia
- List of castles in Slovakia

== Sources ==
- Illáš, Martin (2011). "Predrománsky kostol na Devíne" [The Pre-romanesque Church on Devín] (PDF) (in Slovak). Archived from the original (PDF) on 2016-03-04.
- Ondruš, Šimon (2000). Odtajnené trezory slov I. (in Slovak). Martin: Vydavateľstvo Matice slovenskej. ISBN 80-7090-530-1.
- Turčan, Vladimír (2013). Veľkomoravské hradiská (in Slovak). Bratislava: DAJAMA. ISBN 978-80-8136-013-8.
- Štefanovičová, Tatiana (1989). Osudy starých Slovanov [Fate of the Ancient Slavs] (in Slovak). Osveta.
- Engel, Pál: Magyarország világi archontológiája (1301–1457) (The Temporal Archontology of Hungary (1301–1457)); História - MTA Történettudományi Intézete, 1996, Budapest; ISBN 963-8312-43-2.
