= Devínska Kobyla =

Coordinates: 48°11′26″N 16°59′45″E

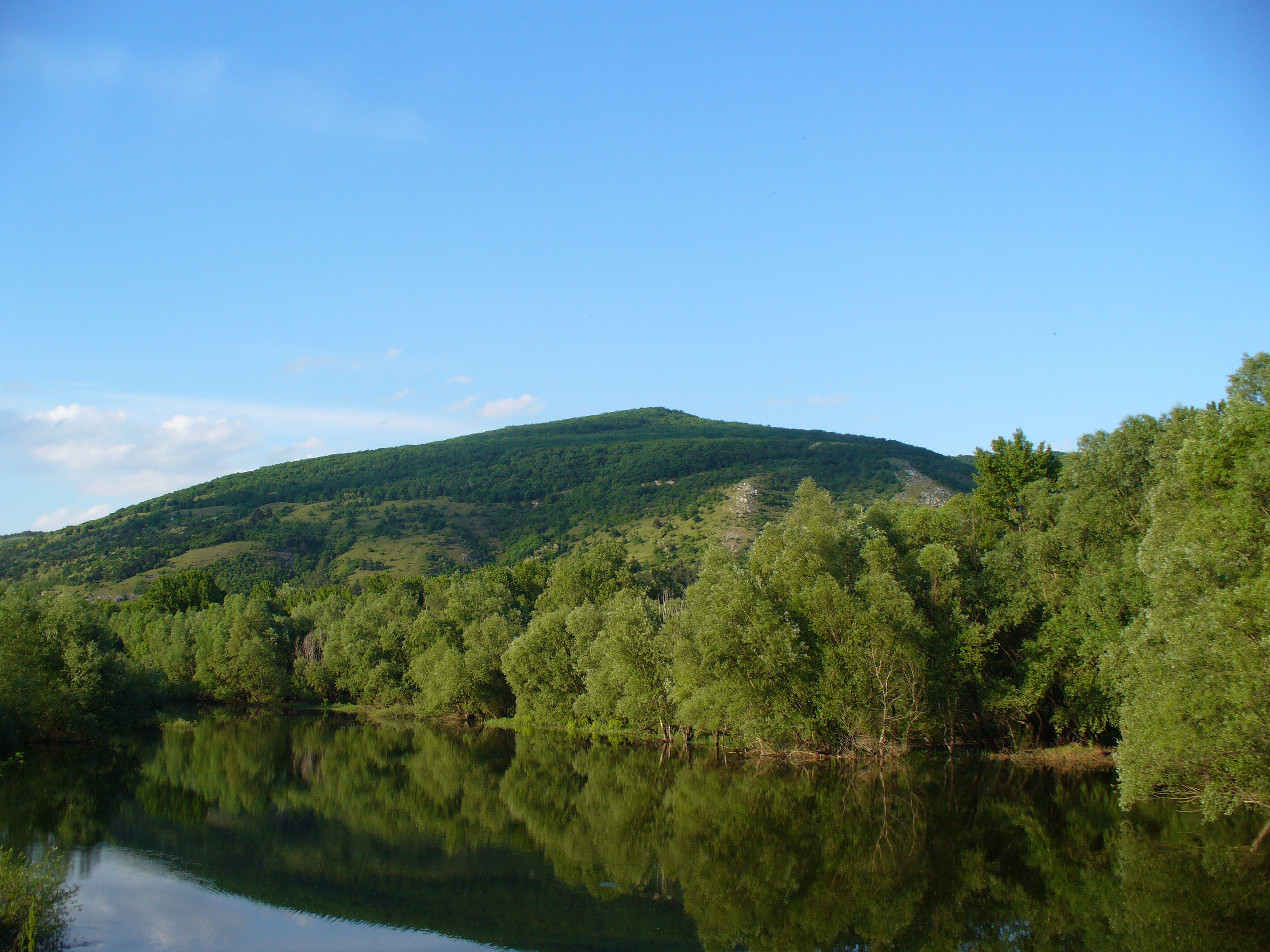
- Devínska Kobyla as seen from the river Morava

Highest point
- Elevation: 514 m (1,686 ft)

Geography
- Location: Bratislava, Slovakia
- Parent range: Little Carpathians

Climbing
- Easiest route: Plachého Street, Dúbravka

Devínska Kobyla (Slovak pronunciation: [ˈɟeʋiːnska ˈkɔbila]; Hungarian: Dévényi-tető; German: Thebener Kogel) is the highest peak in the Devín Carpathians, part of the Little Carpathians mountain range, and the highest point of Bratislava, the capital of Slovakia. It is located between the boroughs of Devínska Nová Ves, Devín and Dúbravka, close to the border with Austria. Its peak elevation is 514 m (1686.3 ft) AMSL and its treeless summit contains an abandoned military missile base (Slovak: Rádiotechnická hláska protivzdušnej obrany štátu) that is officially inaccessible to the public.

Part of southern slopes of the massif has been a national natural reserve since 1965, featuring unique xerothermic forest-steppe flora and fauna with a total protected area of 101 hectares. From the flat top, a view opens of Bratislava, Austria, Hungary, the Danube and the Morava river. Hiking trails do not lead to the summit but instead to an accessible point with partial view underneath.

== Description ==
Devínska Kobyla and its surroundings are one of the four divisions of Devín Carpathians, part of Little Carpathians, itself part of the Carpathian Mountains.

== Flora, fauna, and funga ==
The small area contains 234 species of identified mushrooms, 110 species of identified lichens, 100 species of identified moss, and 1,110 species of identified higher or vascular plants. The southern and south-western slopes of the mountain at the western edge of Bratislava provide ideal living conditions for xerothermic forest-steppe flora and fauna. The woods on the south-western slopes are the remains of the original oak forest.

== Hiking ==
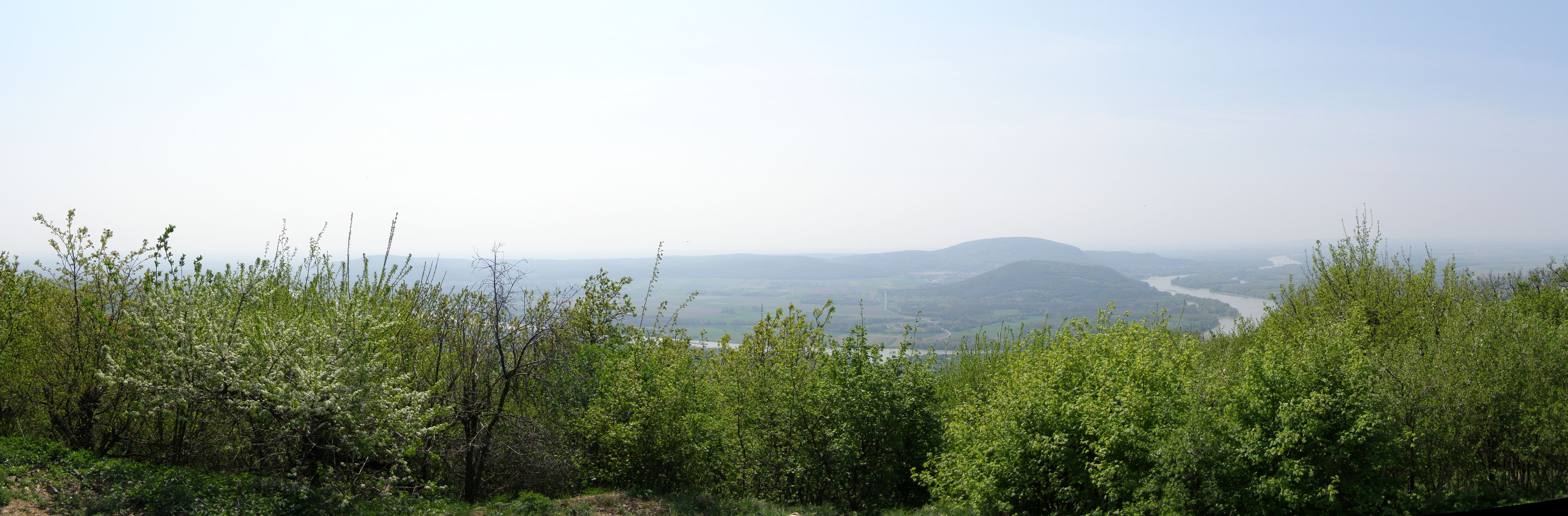
Panorama of Danube taken from Devinska Kobyla

There is a four-kilometer instructive path that leads through Devínska Kobyla, with one significant area called Sandberg. This is one of the most important palaeontological localities in Slovakia. The yellow faces of the old sandpit has remnants of rocks of the tertiary sea with horizontally deposited layers, and there are still fossils of sea fauna to be found there. The age of these rocks is estimated to be between 14 and 16 million years old.

== See also ==
- Little Carpathians Protected Landscape Area
- Devín Carpathians
- Parks and gardens in Bratislava
