= Ignatius Teichberg =

Ignatius Teichberg (April 15, 1923 - January 10, 2006) was a stock broker, investment analyst and financial columnist known as Igo ("pronounced 'ego'").

After 27 years of working for others and building a reputation on "his stock picking prowess," he established a firm under his name and "Teichberg's Market Strategy, a newsletter that specializes in scouting takeover targets."

== Career ==
Having been an employee during a 27-year period at four brokerage firms, he acquired a small firm which he renamed Teichberg, Loeb, Waxman & Rabinowitz. His employers included

- Edward Viner & Co. (vice president)
- D. H. Blair Company
- Gruntal & Co. (his last employer, at which he was "vice president and director of the institutional" research department)

=== Columnist ===
His column at The New York Post, for which circulation "increased by 10% on the day it appeared," gave him publicity that was described by Business Week as "fraught with potential conflict of interest" yet they explained his clean record with "says he doesn't play the market himself" and that most of his brokerage clients "do not own stocks recommended in the Post."

== Biography ==
Born in pre-World War II Poland, his pre-New York path included Romania, and West Berlin. "Teichberg emigrated to New York City in 1952 and five years later became a junior stock analyst." Much later he was quoted as saying that "stock picking is an art, not a science."

He, his son Jonathan Benzion and his wife Charlotte (née Hanft) lived in Forest Hills.
