= Slavín =

War monument in Bratislava

- Slovakia
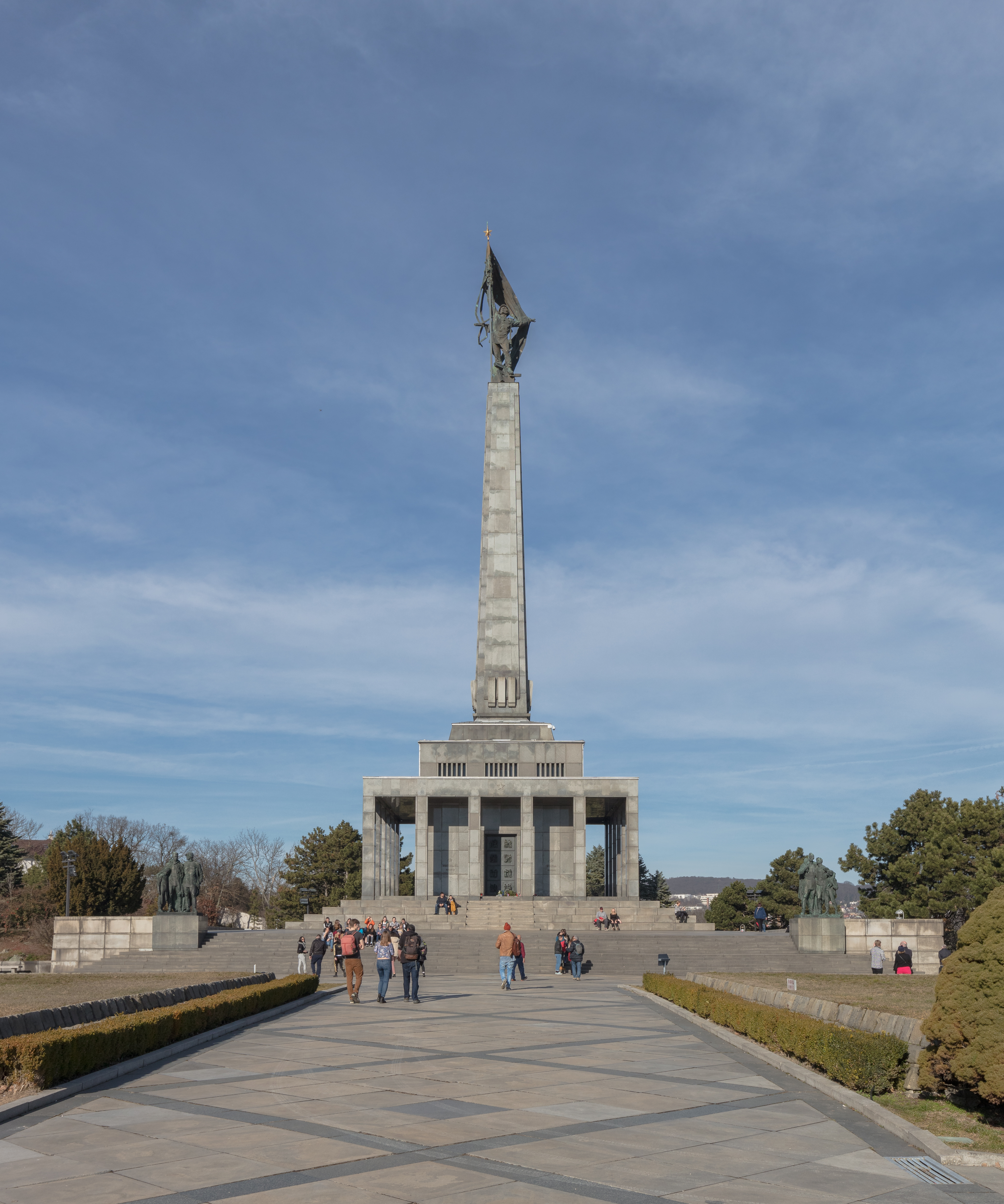
- Slavín war memorial and cemetery for fallen Soviet Army
- For World War II
- Unveiled: April 3, 1960
- Location: 48°09′14″N 17°05′59″E in Bratislava, Slovakia
- Designed by: Ján Svetlík
- Total burials: 6,845 Soviet soldiers

Slavín is a memorial monument and military cemetery in Bratislava, the capital of Slovakia. It is the burial ground of thousands of Soviet Army soldiers who fell during World War II while taking over the city in April 1945 during the Bratislava–Brno offensive from the occupying German Wehrmacht units and the remaining Slovak troops who supported the clero-fascist Tiso government. It is situated on a hill amidst a rich villa quarter of the capital and embassy residences close to the centre of Bratislava.

It was constructed between 1957 and 1960 on the site of a field cemetery, and opened on April 3, 1960 on the occasion of the 15th anniversary of the city's liberation. The monument was constructed similar in kind to the Palace of Culture and Science in Stalinist architectural style. In 1961 it was declared a National Cultural Monument. Its designer was Ján Svetlík.

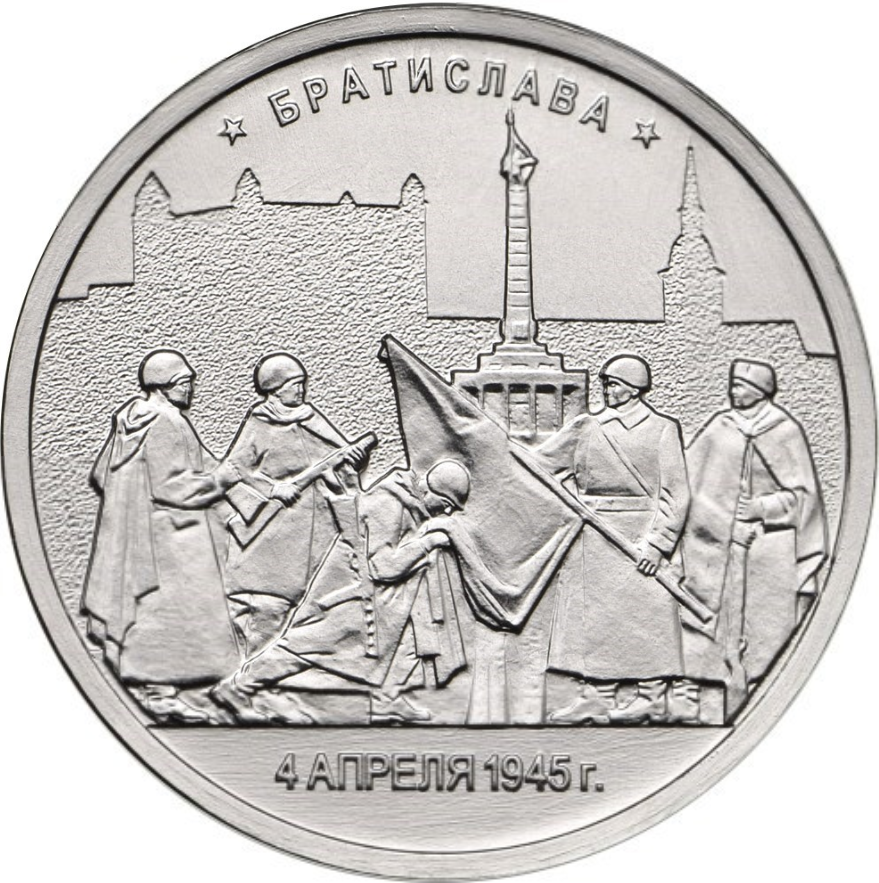
2016 5-ruble steel coin of Russia, featuring Slavín memorial complex. The date says 4 April 1945

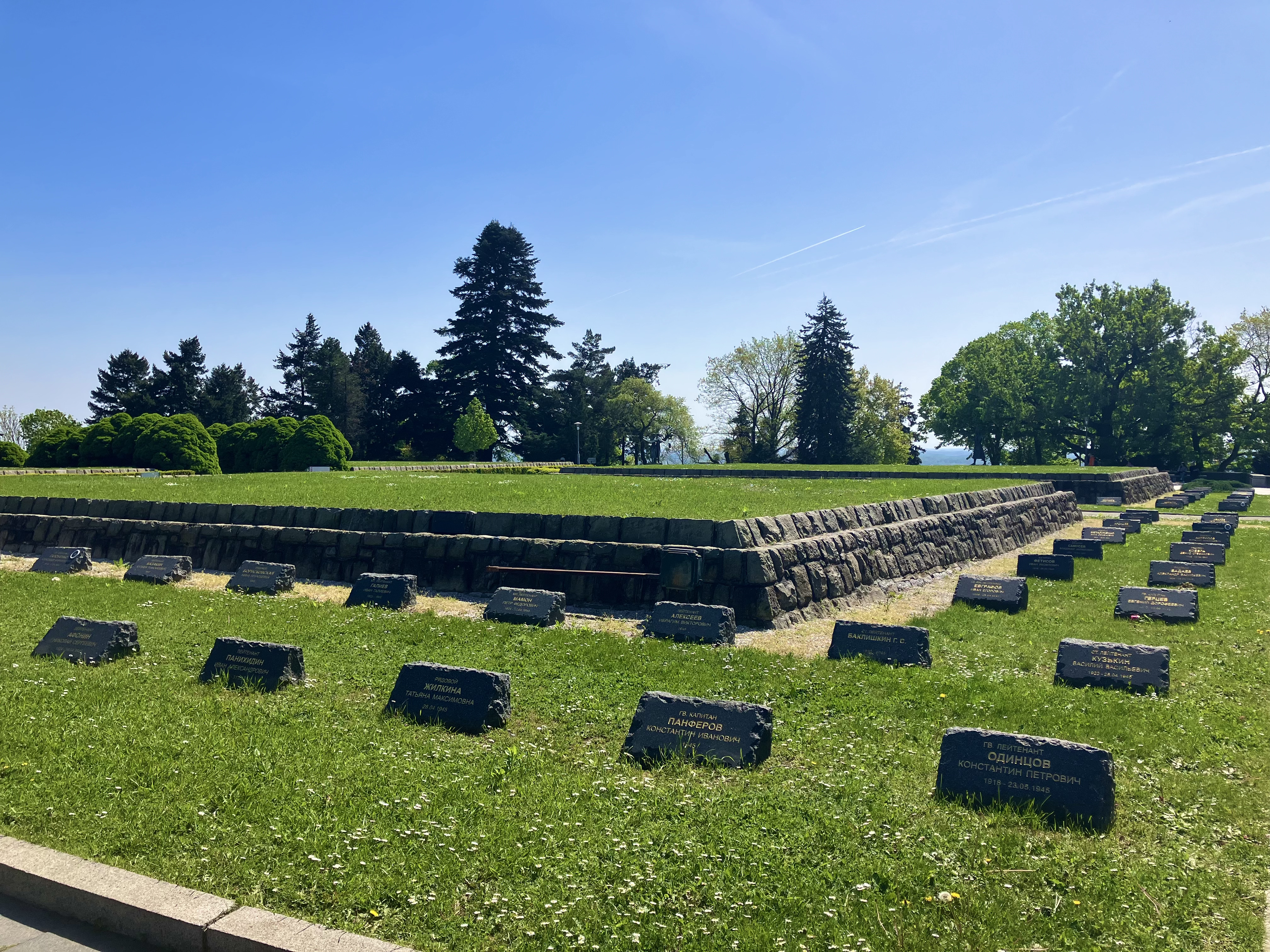
Some marked graves within the cemetery

== History ==
The monument was inaugurated in 4 April 1960 on the occasion of the 15th anniversary of the liberation of the city by the Soviet army. Cities with dates of their liberation are listed on its walls. 6,845 soldiers are buried in the cemetery.

== Description ==
This monument and cemetery of the soldiers of the Soviet Army killed while liberating Bratislava near the end of the Second World War was designated a National Cultural Monument in 1961. On top of the 40-metre-tall (130 ft) obelisk is a 11-metre-tall (36 ft) statue of a soldier from Slovak sculptor Alexander Trizuljak. The soldier is holding up a flag in his right hand and crushing the swastika with his left boot. The bronze caisson door of the memorial auditorium is decorated with reliefs by R. Pribiš.

The site consists of:

- A staircase
- A cemetery with graves (6 mass graves, 278 individual graves) of 6,845 Soviet soldiers who fell while liberating Bratislava
- The central solemn hall with various statues, inscriptions, and a symbolic sarcophagus made of white marble. It also features a 40 m high obelisk topped with a statue of a Soviet soldier, and on the outside walls are inscriptions of the dates of liberation of various places in Slovakia during 1944–45.

Other facts about Slavín:

- The monument is situated on top of the Slavín hill, one of Bratislava Old Town's topographic highs (part of the Male Karpaty mts.). The location offers excellent views of much of Bratislava, which makes it a popular destination for walks for local residents.
- In the area of Slavín there are also more statues of Slovak famous artists, such as Jan Kulich, Tibor Bártfay and Jozef Kostka.
- In 2005, Vladimir Putin, the Russian president, visited it during his meeting with G. W. Bush in Bratislava.
- The day of Bratislava's liberation is 4 April, when people and president show their honor to fallen Soviet soldiers.
- In 2015, Sergey Lavrov, the Russian foreign minister, visited Slavín on the occasion of the 70th anniversary of Bratislava's liberation.

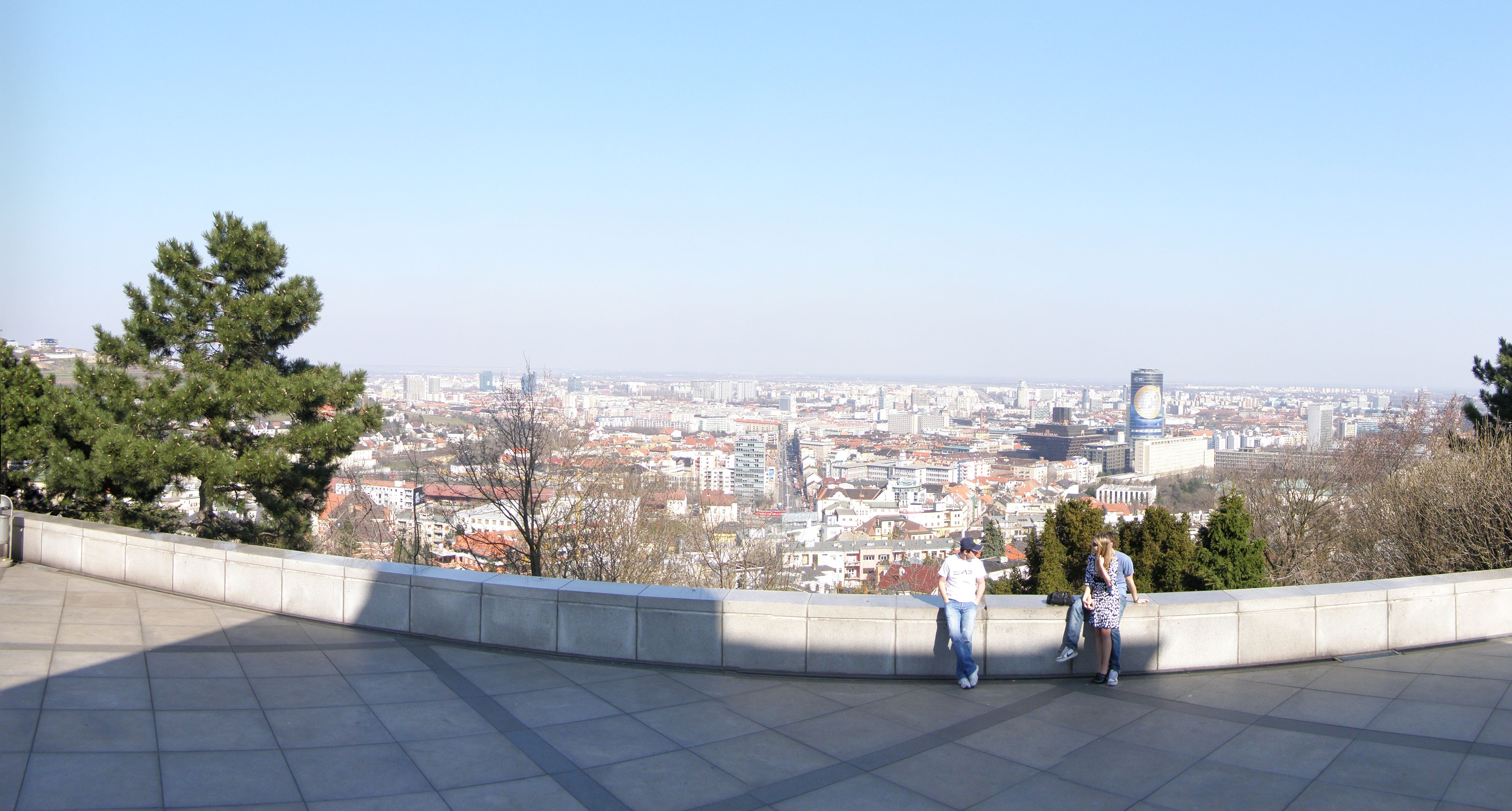
Panorama from Slavin Memorial. (2009)

== See also ==
- Devín Carpathians
