= Hundsheimer Berge =

Hill range in Austria

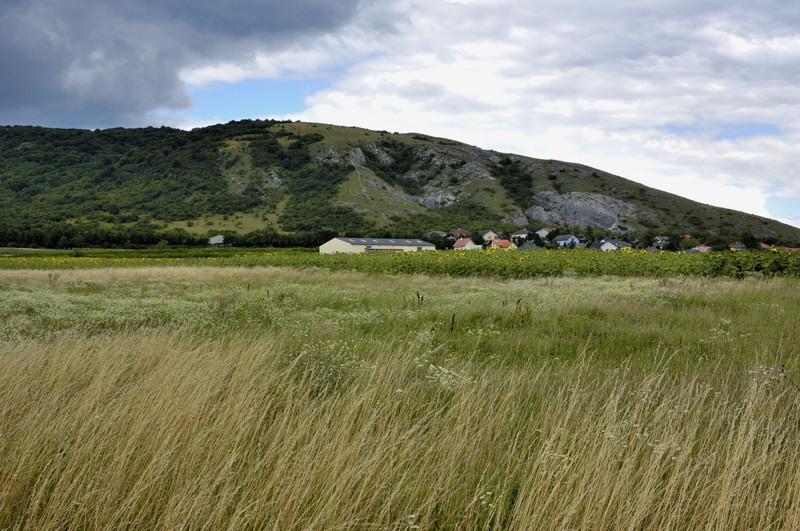
- Hundsheimer Berge

Highest point
- Peak: Hundsheimer Berg
- Elevation: 481 m (1,578 ft)
- Coordinates: 48°07′57″N 16°56′18″E

Geography
- Country: Austria
- Range coordinates: 48°07′N 16°58′E
- Parent range: Western Carpathians

The Hundsheimer Berge (also Hainburger Berge) is a hill range located in Lower Austria and Burgenland, Austria next to the Devín Gate. It is the most southern part of the Devín Carpathians. The mountain range covers approximately 36 square kilometres (14 sq mi) and is bordered by the river Danube to the north and east, and the Vienna plate to the south and west. Its highest peak is Hundsheimer Berg at 481 metres (1,578 ft) AMSL. While fairly low, the Hundsheimer Berge rise from only 140 metres (460 ft) above sea level by the Danube.

The mountains are densely forested, mostly with beech trees. The southern slopes are traditionally used by humans for agriculture and particularly wine-making. There are many vineyards in the area. South of Edelstal are wine cellars offering wine-tasting. The mountains feature the ruins of the Pottenburg Castle.

Major peaks:

- Hundsheimer Berg, 481 metres (1,578 ft) AMSL
- Weisses Kreuz, 363 metres (1,191 ft) AMSL
- Braunsberg, 346 metres (1,135 ft) AMSL
- Königswarte, 344 metres (1,129 ft) AMSL
- Pfaffenberg, 331 metres (1,086 ft) AMSL
- Teichberg, 321 metres (1,053 ft) AMSL
- Spitzerberg, 302 metres (991 ft) AMSL
- Hindlerberg, 298 metres (978 ft) AMSL
- Galgenbergl, 157 metres (515 ft) AMSL
