= Telephone numbers in Slovakia =

- Location of Slovakia

Location
- Country: Slovakia
- Continent: Europe
- Regulator: Office for regulation of electronic communications and postal services
- Type: Closed
- Format: XXX/XXX-XXXX or XX/XXXX-XXXX or XXXX XXX XXX

Access codes
- Country code: +421
- International access: 00
- Long-distance: 0

This page details the format and usage of telephone numbers in Slovakia. Today, Slovakia uses a closed numbering plan with area codes beginning with 0. After 0, there is usually a 2-digit prefix, followed by a 7-digit subscriber number. The capital, Bratislava, has one-digit prefix and an 8-digit subscriber number.

Following the break-up of Czechoslovakia in 1993, the successor states, the Czech Republic and Slovakia, continued to share the 42 country code, until 28 February 1997, when the Czech Republic adopted 420 while Slovakia adopted 421.

== Numbering plan ==
National Destination Code for mobile telephones
| All networks | 090[1-9], 091x, 094x, 095x |

National Destination Codes for geographical numbering areas (from 01.07.2001)
| Secondary area (4) | Primary area (25) | National Number | |
| Secondary area (4) | Primary area (25) | NDC | SN (# of digits) |
|---|---|---|---|
| Bratislava | Bratislava | 2 | 8 |
| Western Slovakia | Dunajská Streda | 31 | 7 |
| Western Slovakia | Trenčín | 32 | 7 |
| Western Slovakia | Trnava | 33 | 7 |
| Western Slovakia | Senica | 34 | 7 |
| Western Slovakia | Nové Zámky | 35 | 7 |
| Western Slovakia | Levice | 36 | 7 |
| Western Slovakia | Nitra | 37 | 7 |
| Western Slovakia | Topoľčany | 38 | 7 |
| Central Slovakia | Žilina | 41 | 7 |
| Central Slovakia | Považská Bystrica | 42 | 7 |
| Central Slovakia | Martin | 43 | 7 |
| Central Slovakia | Liptovský Mikuláš | 44 | 7 |
| Central Slovakia | Zvolen | 45 | 7 |
| Central Slovakia | Prievidza | 46 | 7 |
| Central Slovakia | Lučenec | 47 | 7 |
| Central Slovakia | Banská Bystrica | 48 | 7 |
| Eastern Slovakia | Prešov | 51 | 7 |
| Eastern Slovakia | Poprad | 52 | 7 |
| Eastern Slovakia | Spišská Nová Ves | 53 | 7 |
| Eastern Slovakia | Bardejov | 54 | 7 |
| Eastern Slovakia | Košice | 55 | 7 |
| Eastern Slovakia | Michalovce | 56 | 7 |
| Eastern Slovakia | Humenné | 57 | 7 |
| Eastern Slovakia | Rožňava | 58 | 7 |

== Special codes (emergency calls) ==
The following special telephone numbers are valid across the country:

- 112 - General emergency
- 150 - Fire brigade
- 155 - Ambulance
- 158 - Police
- 159 - Municipal police

These numbers are toll-free.
