= Východné Slovensko =

Coordinates: 48°53′04″N 20°18′57″E

Eastern Slovakia Východné Slovensko
- Region
- Country: Slovakia

Area
  - Total: 15,727 km^{2} (6,072 sq mi)

Population (2024)
  - Total: 1,587,883
  - Density: 100.97/km^{2} (261.50/sq mi)

GDP
  - Total: €27,310 billion (2024)
  - Per capita: €17,198 (2024)
- NUTS code: SK04
- HDI (2022): 0.817 very high • 4th

Eastern Slovakia (Východné Slovensko) is a subdivision of Slovakia as defined by the Nomenclature of Territorial Units for Statistics (NUTS). It is one of the four classified NUTS-2 statistical regions of Slovakia. The region incorporates the eastern parts of the country, and encompasses an area of 15,727 km^{2} (6,072 sq mi). It incorporates two kraje–Košice, and Prešov. It has a population of nearly 1.59 million inhabitants. It is the second largest by area and the second most populated of the four regions of Slovakia.

== Classification ==
The country of Slovakia is organized into 8 regions (kraje) for administrative purposes. The Nomenclature of Territorial Units for Statistics (NUTS) organizes the country into four broader level sub-divisions. These are classified as a NUTS-2 statistical regions of Slovakia, and incorporate one or more regions within it. The regions form the NUTS-3 territorial units under them.

== Geography ==
Eastern Slovakia incorporates the eastern parts of the country, encompassing an area of 15,727 km^{2} (6,072 sq mi). The region is located in Central Europe, and is completely land locked as Slovakia does not have access to sea. It shares land borders with Poland in the north, Ukraine in the east, and Hungary in the south. It is bordered by Central Slovakia region on the west. The eastern edge of the Western Carpathians form the western side of the Eastern Slovakia region. The Eastern Slovak Lowland, which are part of the Inner Western Carpathians depressions, forms the eastern portion. Both the highest and lowest points of Slovakia are located in the region.

=== Sub-regions ===
Eastern Slovenia incorporates two kraje–Košice, and Prešov.

Sub-divisions
Name	Official name	NUTS code	Area	Population (2021)
Prešov	Prešovsky kraj	SK041	8,973 km^{2} (3,464 sq mi)	808,931
Košice	Košicky kraj	SK042	6,754 km^{2} (2,608 sq mi)	782,216
Eastern Slovakia	Východné Slovensko	SK04	15,727 km^{2} (6,072 sq mi)	1,591,147

== Demographics ==
Historical population

Year	Pop.	±%
1970	1,228,029	—
1980	1,377,211	+12.1%
1991	1,480,459	+7.5%

Year	Pop.	±%
2001	1,555,980	+5.1%
2011	1,606,250	+3.2%
2021	1,591,147	−0.9%

Source: Census of Slovakia

Eastern Slovakia had a population of nearly 1.59 million in 2024, and is the second most populated of the four regions of Slovakia. The region has the lowest Human Development Index, and is the poorest in terms of wages and employment amongst the regions of Slovakia. The region suffers from a lack of modern infrastructure compared to the other regions. Eastern Slovakia was the only region apart from the Bratislava region to have a population growth in the early 2020s despite the exodus of young people to the capital region and abroad. However, while the population had begun to shrink in the early 2020s similar to the other two large regions, a large exodus of Ukrainians fleeing the Russo-Ukrainian War had resulted in a temporary increase in population since 2022.
