= List of Slovak regions by Human Development Index =

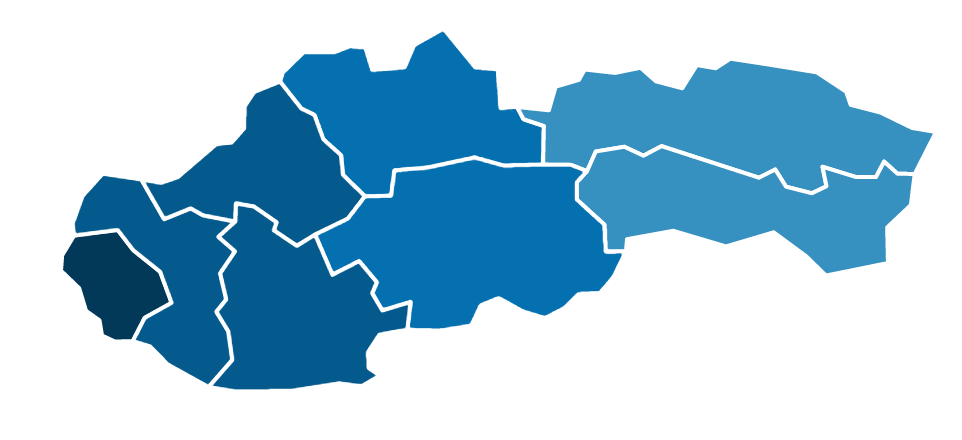
Slovak regions by Human Development Index in 2023 0.967 0.871 0.863 0.844

This is a list of NUTS 2 statistical regions of Slovakia by Human Development Index as of 2023.

Rank	Region	HDI (2023)
Very high human development
1	Bratislava Region	0.967
–	Slovakia (average)	0.880
2	Western Slovakia	0.871
3	Central Slovakia	0.863
4	Eastern Slovakia	0.844
