= Central Slovakia =

Coordinates: 48°53′11″N 19°19′58″E

Central Slovakia Stredné Slovensko
- Region
- Country: Slovakia

Area
  - Total: 16,263 km^{2} (6,279 sq mi)

Population (2024)
  - Total: 1,301,530
  - Density: 80.030/km^{2} (207.28/sq mi)

GDP
  - Total: €25,828 billion (2024)
  - Per capita: €19,914 (2024)
- NUTS code: SK03
- HDI (2022): 0.836 very high • 3rd

Central Slovakia (Slovak: Stredné Slovensko) is a subdivision of Slovakia as defined by the Nomenclature of Territorial Units for Statistics (NUTS). It is one of the four classified NUTS-2 statistical regions of Slovakia. The region incorporates the central parts of the country, and encompasses an area of 16,263 km^{2} (6,279 sq mi). It incorporates two kraje–Žilina, and Banská Bystrica. The region is home to more than 1.3 million inhabitants. Despite being the largest region of Slovakia by area, it is the second least populated after the Bratislava region.

== Classification ==
The country of Slovakia is organized into 12 regions (kraje) for administrative purposes. The Nomenclature of Territorial Units for Statistics (NUTS) organizes the country into four broader level sub-divisions. These are classified as a NUTS-2 statistical regions of Slovakia, and incorporate one or more regions within it. The regions form the NUTS-3 territorial units under them.

== Geography ==
Central Slovakia incorporates the central parts of the country excluding, encompassing an area of 16,263 km^{2} (6,279 sq mi). The region is located in Central Europe, and is completely land locked as Slovakia does not have access to sea. It shares land borders with Czechia and Poland in the north, and Hungary in the south. It is bordered by Western Slovakia on the west, and Eastern Slovakia on the east. Most of the Central Slovakia is dominated by the Western Carpathians mountains.

=== Sub-regions ===
Central Slovakia incorporates incorporates three kraje–kraje–Žilina, and Banská Bystrica.

Sub-divisions
Name	Official name	NUTS code	Area (km^{2})	Population (2021)
Žilina	Žilinsky kraj	SK031	6,801 km^{2} (2,626 sq mi)	691,613
Banská Bystrica	Banskobystricky kraj	SK032	9,454 km^{2} (3,650 sq mi)	625,601
Central Slovakia	Stredné Slovensko	SK03	16,263 km (10,105 mi)	1,312,714

== Demographics ==
Historical population

Year	Pop.	±%
1970	1,169,321	—
1980	1,266,119	+8.3%
1991	1,328,112	+4.9%

Year	Pop.	±%
2001	1,354,453	+2.0%
2011	1,349,414	−0.4%
2021	1,312,714	−2.7%

Source: Census of Slovakia

Central Slovakia had a population of over 1.3 million in 2024. Despite being the largest region of Slovakia by area, it is the second least populated after the Bratislava region. While the region has a high Human Development Index, and is the second least developed region after Eastern Slovakia. The population of the region has been shrinking since the late 2000s, similar to the other two large regions of Slovakia (Eastern and Western Slovakia). The average of the resident population has been increasing, with increased life expectancy, decreased rate of birth, and exodus of young people to the capital region and abroad.
