= Svidnička =

- Municipality
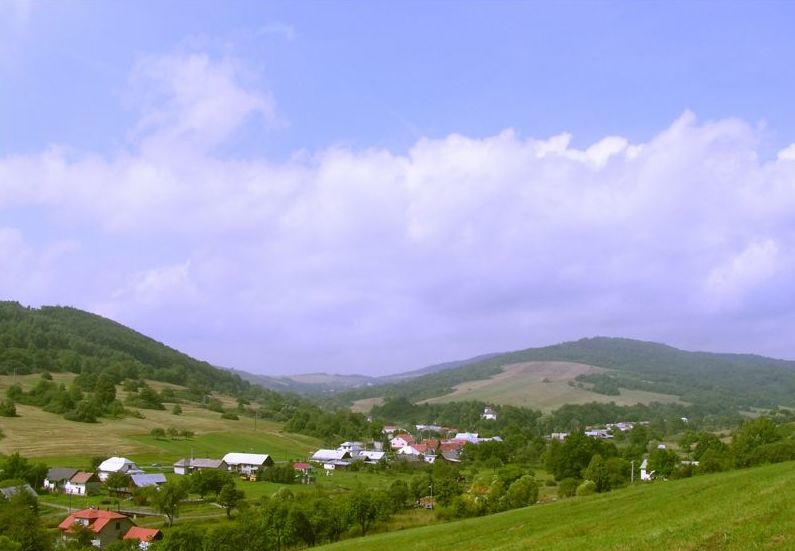

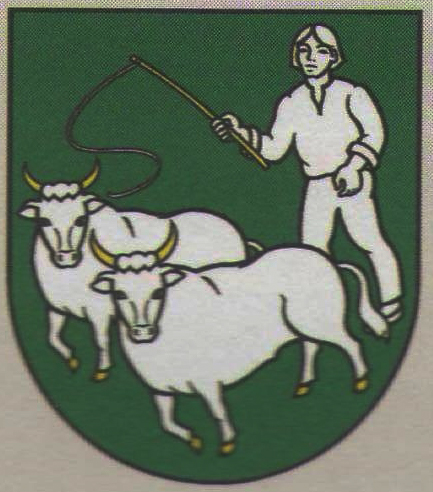
- Flag Coat of arms

- Location of Svidnička in the Prešov Region Location of Svidnička in Slovakia
- Coordinates: 49.38°N 21.57°E
- Country: Slovakia
- Region: Prešov Region
- District: Svidník District
- First mentioned: 1572

Area
  - Total: 5.72 km^{2} (2.21 sq mi)
- Elevation: 317 m (1,040 ft)

Population (2025)
  - Total: 128

Population by ethnicity (2011)
  - Slovaks: 73.8%
  - Rusyns: 22%
  - Czechs: 0.7%
  - Unreported: 3.5%

Population by religion (2011)
  - Greek Catholic: 80.1%
  - Orthodox: 9.2%
  - Lutheran: 3.5%
  - Roman Catholic: 1.4%
  - Irreligious: 1.4%
  - Unreported: 4.3%
- Time zone: UTC+1 (CET)
  - Summer (DST): UTC+2 (CEST)
- Postal code: 900 2
- Area code: +421 54
- Vehicle registration plate (until 2022): SK
- Website: www.svidnicka.sk

Svidnička (Hungarian: Kisfagyalos, until 1899: Szvidnicska) is a village and municipality in Svidník District in the Prešov Region of north-eastern Slovakia.

== History ==
In historical records the village was first mentioned in 1572.

== Geography ==
The municipality lies at an altitude of 317 metres (1,040 ft) and covers an area of 5.72 km^{2} (2.21 sq mi) (2025).

== Population ==
Population statistic (10 years)
Year	1995	2005	2015	2025
Count	127	129	140	128
Difference		+1.57%	+8.52%	−8.57%

Population statistic
Year	2024	2025
Count	135	128
Difference		−5.18%

It has a population of 128 people (31 December 2025).

=== Ethnicity ===
Census 2021 (1+ %)
Ethnicity	Number	Fraction
Slovak	119	83.8%
Rusyn	63	44.36%
Romani	8	5.63%
Czech	2	1.4%
Ukrainian	2	1.4%
Total	142	

In year 2021 was 142 people by ethnicity 119 as Slovak, 63 as Rusyn, 8 as Romani, 2 as Czech, 2 as Ukrainian, 1 as Not found out and 1 as Hungarian.

Note on population: The difference values of population numbers in the table "Population statistic" and in the sections "Ethnicity" & "Religion" is caused by the use of various statistical methods.

=== Religion ===
Census 2021 (1+ %)
Religion	Number	Fraction
Greek Catholic Church	100	70.42%
Eastern Orthodox Church	18	12.68%
Roman Catholic Church	9	6.34%
Evangelical Church	7	4.93%
None	4	2.82%
Apostolic Church	2	1.41%
Total	142	

In year 2021 was 142 people by religion 100 from Greek Catholic Church, 18 from Eastern Orthodox Church, 9 from Roman Catholic Church, 7 from Evangelical Church, 4 from None, 2 from Apostolic Church, 1 from Not found out and 1 from Other.
