= Western Slovakia =

Coordinates: 48°28′36″N 18°02′30″E

Western Slovakia Západné Slovensko
- Region
- Country: Slovakia

Area
  - Total: 14,992 km^{2} (5,788 sq mi)

Population (2024)
  - Total: 1,802,517
  - Density: 120.23/km^{2} (311.40/sq mi)

GDP
  - Total: €40.573 billion (2024)
  - Per capita: €22,578 (2024)
- NUTS code: SK02
- HDI (2022): 0.843 very high · 2nd

Western Slovakia (Západné Slovensko) is a subdivision of Slovakia as defined by the Nomenclature of Territorial Units for Statistics (NUTS). It is one of the four classified NUTS-2 statistical regions of Slovakia. The region incorporates the western parts of the country excluding the Bratislava Region, and encompasses an area of 14,992 km^{2} (5,788 sq mi). It incorporates three kraje–Nitra, Trnava and Trenčín. It has a population of more than 1.8 million, and is the most populated of the four regions of Slovakia.

== Classification ==
The country of Slovakia is organized into 12 regions (kraje) for administrative purposes. The Nomenclature of Territorial Units for Statistics (NUTS) organizes the country into four broader level sub-divisions. These are classified as a NUTS-2 statistical regions of Slovakia, and incorporate one or more regions within it. The regions form the NUTS-3 territorial units under them.

== Geography ==
Western Slovakia incorporates the western parts of the country excluding the Bratislava Region, encompassing an area of 14,992 km^{2} (5,788 sq mi). The region is located in Central Europe, and is completely land locked as Slovakia does not have access to sea. It shares land borders with Czechia in the north, Austria in the west, and Hungary in the south. It is bordered by Central Slovakia on the east, and the Bratislava Region on the west. Western Slovakia is dominated by mountains and valleys that extend from the Western Carpathians. The region is home to Žitný ostrov, the largest river island in Europe, extending from Bratislava to Komárno. Spread over 1,900 km^{2} (730 sq mi), it lies between the Danube, its tributaries Little Danube and Váh.

=== Sub-regions ===
Western Slovenia incorporates three kraje–Nitra, Trnava and Trenčín.

Sub-divisions
| Name | Official name | NUTS code | Area | Population (2021) |
|---|---|---|---|---|
| Trnava | Trnavsky kraj | SK021 | 4,146 km^{2} (1,601 sq mi) | 566,008 |
| Trenčín | Trenčíansky kraj | SK022 | 4,502 km^{2} (1,738 sq mi) | 577,464 |
| Nitra | Nitriansky kraj | SK023 | 6,344 km^{2} (2,449 sq mi) | 677,900 |
| Western Slovakia | Západné Slovensko | SK02 | 14,992 km^{2} (5,788 sq mi) | 1,821,372 |

== Demographics ==
Historical population

| Year | Pop. | ±% |
|---|---|---|
| 1970 | 1,679,965 | — |
| 1980 | 1,804,038 | +7.4% |
| 1991 | 1,859,413 | +3.1% |

| Year | Pop. | ±% |
|---|---|---|
| 2001 | 1,870,007 | +0.6% |
| 2011 | 1,838,936 | −1.7% |
| 2021 | 1,821,372 | −1.0% |

Source: Census of Slovakia

Western Slovakia had a population of over 1.8 million in 2024, and is the most populated of the four regions of Slovakia. The region has a high Human Development Index, and is more developed than the other two larger regions of Slovakia (Central and East Slovakia). It also has the lowest rate of unemployment across the country. However, the population has been shrinking, and is on a downward trend since the late 2000s. The average of the resident population has been increasing, with increased life expectancy, decreased rate of birth, and exodus of young people to the capital region and abroad. Western Slovakia has seen the greatest drop in school enrollment compared to the other regions in the late 2020s.
