= NUTS statistical regions of Slovakia =

Statistical regions of Slovakia

In the NUTS (Nomenclature of Territorial Units for Statistics) codes of Slovakia (SK), the three levels are:

Level	Subdivisions	#
NUTS 1	—	1
NUTS 2	Oblasts (Oblasti)	4
NUTS 3	Regions (Kraje)	8

== NUTS codes ==
SK0 Slovakia

SK01 Bratislava Region

SK010 Bratislava Region

SK02 Western Slovakia (Západné Slovensko)

SK021 Trnava Region
SK022 Trenčín Region
SK023 Nitra Region

SK03 Central Slovakia (Stredné Slovensko)

SK031 Žilina Region
SK032 Banská Bystrica Region

SK04 Eastern Slovakia (Východné Slovensko)

SK041 Prešov Region
SK042 Košice Region

== Local administrative units ==
Below the NUTS levels, the two LAU (Local Administrative Units) levels are:

Level	Subdivisions	#
LAU 1	Districts (Okresy)	79
LAU 2	Municipalities (Obce)	2928

The LAU codes of Slovakia can be downloaded here:

== See also ==
- Subdivisions of Slovakia
- ISO 3166-2 codes of Slovakia
- FIPS region codes of Slovakia

== Sources ==
- Hierarchical list of the Nomenclature of territorial units for statistics - NUTS and the Statistical regions of Europe
- Overview map of EU Countries - NUTS level 1
  - SLOVENSKÁ REPUBLIKA - NUTS level 2
  - SLOVENSKÁ REPUBLIKA - NUTS level 3
- Correspondence between the NUTS levels and the national administrative units
- List of current NUTS codes
  - Download current NUTS codes (ODS format)
- Regions of Slovakia, Statoids.com
