= Okres =

Administrative district in Czechia and Slovakia

Okres (Czech and Slovak term meaning "district" in English; from German Kreis - circle (or perimeter)) refers to administrative entities in the Czech Republic and Slovakia. It is similar to Landkreis in Germany or "okrug" and "okrestnost’ " in other Slavic-speaking countries.

The first districts in the Czech lands developed from domains in 1850 by the decision of the Imperial government of Austria. In the territory of present-day Slovakia their predecessors were districts of the counties of the Kingdom of Hungary (slúžnovský okres in Slovak). The organisation and functions of the districts were different in the Czech lands and Hungary. After the creation of Czechoslovakia districts became an administrative unit of the new state with a unified status. After the dissolution of Czechoslovakia in 1993, the district system was taken over by the two current successor states.

== Equivalents ==
- Okręg
- Okrug
- Okruha

== See also ==
- Districts of Slovakia (okres)
- Districts of the Czech Republic (okres)
- Powiat
- Raion

=== Upper-level division ===
- Kraj
- Krai
- Kreis
- Regions of Slovakia (kraj)
- Regions of the Czech Republic (kraj)

=== Lower-level division ===
- Obec (subdivisions of an okres)
