= ISO 3166-2:SK =

Entry for Slovakia in ISO 3166-2

ISO 3166-2:SK is the entry for Slovakia in ISO 3166-2, part of the ISO 3166 standard published by the International Organization for Standardization (ISO), which defines codes for the names of the principal subdivisions (e.g., provinces or states) of all countries coded in ISO 3166-1.

Currently for Slovakia, ISO 3166-2 codes are defined for eight regions.

Each code consists of two parts separated by a hyphen. The first part is SK, the ISO 3166-1 alpha-2 code of Slovakia. The second part is two letters.

== Current codes ==
Subdivision names are listed as in the ISO 3166-2 standard published by the ISO 3166 Maintenance Agency (ISO 3166/MA).

Click on the button in the header to sort each column.

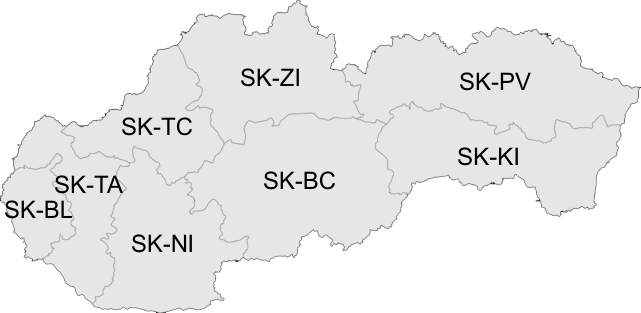
Map of Slovakia with each region labelled with its ISO 3166-2 code.

Code	Subdivision name (sk)	Subdivision name (en) (Note: For reference only, English name not included in the ISO 3166-2 standard.)
SK-BC	Banskobystrický kraj	Banská Bystrica
SK-BL	Bratislavský kraj	Bratislava
SK-KI	Košický kraj	Košice
SK-NI	Nitriansky kraj	Nitra
SK-PV	Prešovský kraj	Prešov
SK-TC	Trenčiansky kraj	Trenčín
SK-TA	Trnavský kraj	Trnava
SK-ZI	Žilinský kraj	Žilina

== See also ==
- Subdivisions of Slovakia
- FIPS region codes of Slovakia
- NUTS codes of Slovakia
- Neighbouring countries: AT, CZ, HU, PL, UA
