= Demographics of Slovakia =

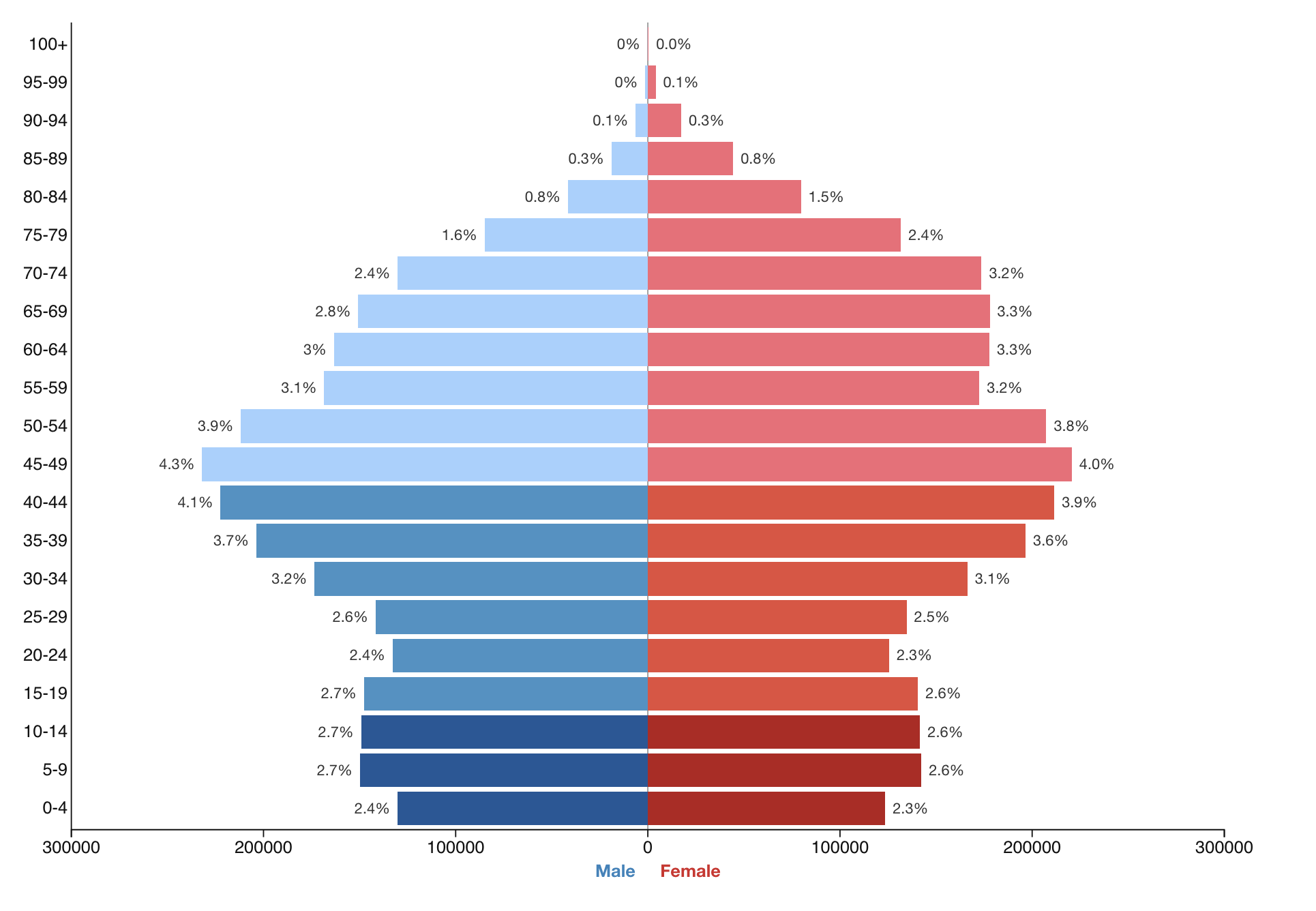
- Population pyramid of Slovakia in 2026
- Population: 5,422,194 (2024 est.)
- Birth rate: 9.7 births/1,000 population
- Death rate: 11.0 deaths/1,000 population
- Life expectancy: 78.31 years
  - male: 74.83 years
  - female: 82.04 years
- Fertility rate: 1.57 children
- Infant mortality: 4.82 deaths/1,000 live births
- Net migration rate: 0.2 migrant(s)/1,000 population
- Immigrant share: 5.9% (2024)

Sex ratio
- Total: 0.94 male(s)/female (2022 est.)

Nationality
- Nationality: Slovak
- Major ethnic: Slovak (88.6%)
- Minor ethnic: Hungarians (8.2%); Romani (1.3%); other European ethnicities (1.9%); non-Europeans ethnic groups (account for less than 1%); meaning that 98% to over 99% belongs to European ethnic groups

Demographic features of the population of Slovakia include population density, ethnicity, education level, health of the populace, economic status, religious affiliations and other aspects of the population. The demographic statistics are from the Statistical Office of the SR, unless otherwise indicated.

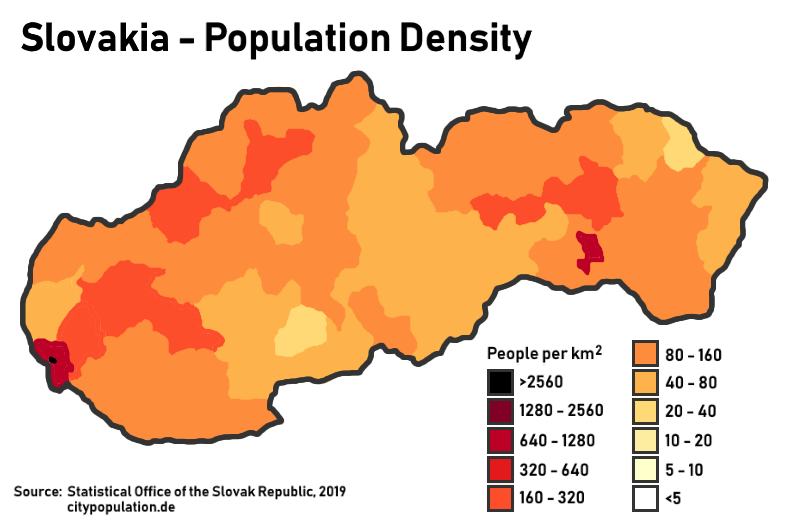
Population density in Slovakia, by district.

== Population ==
Historical population
Year	Pop.	±% p.a.
1848	2,442,000	—
1869	2,481,811	+0.08%
1880	2,477,521	−0.02%
1890	2,595,180	+0.47%
1900	2,782,925	+0.70%
1910	2,916,657	+0.47%
1921	2,993,859	+0.24%
1930	3,324,111	+1.17%
1946	3,327,803	+0.01%
1950	3,442,317	+0.85%
1961	4,174,046	+1.77%
1970	4,537,290	+0.93%
1980	4,991,168	+0.96%
1991	5,274,335	+0.50%
2001	5,379,455	+0.20%
2011	5,397,036	+0.03%
2021	5,449,270	+0.10%

Total population: 5,422,194 as of 2024.

Demographic statistics according to the World Population Review in 2021.

- One birth every 10 minutes
- One death every 9 minutes
- One net migrant every 480 minutes
- Net gain of one person every 1440 minutes

=== Population over time ===
Progression of population at censuses
Census Date	Population	Population density (per km^{2})
1848	2,442,000 (est.)	50
1869	2,481,811	51
1880	2,477,521	51
1890	2,595,180	53
1900	2,782,925	57
1910	2,916,657	60
February 15, 1921	2,993,859	61
December 1, 1930	3,324,111	68
October 4, 1946	3,327,803	68
March 1, 1950	3,442,317	70
March 1, 1961	4,174,046	85
December 1, 1970	4,537,290	93
November 1, 1980	4,991,168	102
March 3, 1991	5,274,335	108
May 26, 2001	5,379,455	110
May 21, 2011	5,397,036	110
June 13, 2021	5,449,270	111

View source data.

=== Population growth rate ===
-0.08% (2021 est.) Country comparison to the world: 202nd

=== Fertility ===
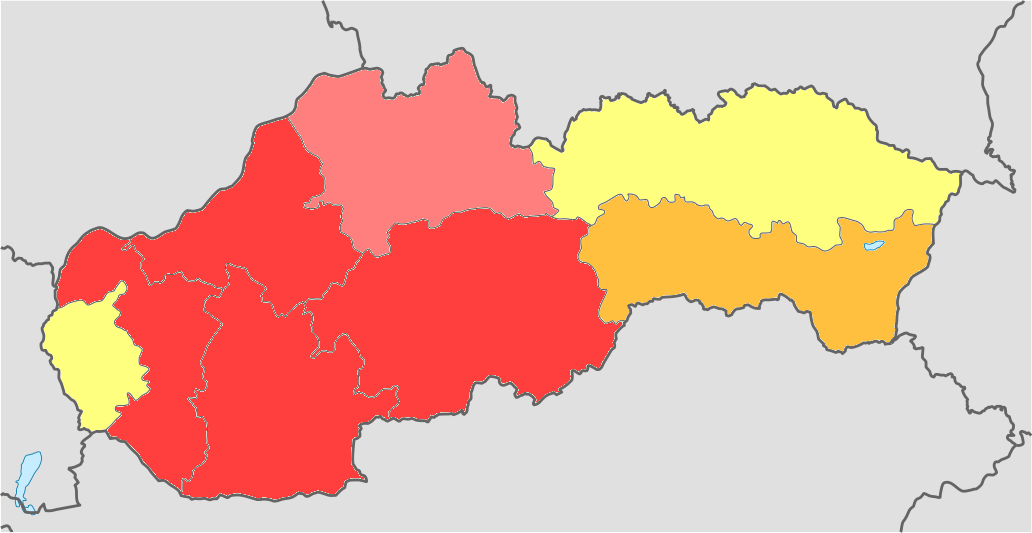
Slovakia total fertility rate by region (2014) 1.5–1.7 1.4–1.5 1.3–1.4 < 1.3

The total fertility rate is the number of children born per woman. It is based on fairly good data for the entire period. Sources: Our World In Data and Gapminder Foundation.

Years	1876	1877	1878	1879	1880	1881	1882	1883	1884	1885	1886	1887	1888	1889	1890
Total Fertility Rate in Slovakia	5.96	5.96	5.92	5.87	5.83	5.78	5.74	5.77	5.8	5.83	5.86	5.9	5.83	5.76	5.7

Years	1891	1892	1893	1894	1895	1896	1897	1898	1899	1900
Total Fertility Rate in Slovakia	5.63	5.56	5.54	5.52	5.5	5.49	5.47	5.42	5.37	5.31

Years	1901	1902	1903	1904	1905	1906	1907	1908	1909	1910
Total Fertility Rate in Slovakia	5.26	5.21	5.16	5.1	5.04	4.99	4.93	4.86	4.78	4.71

Years	1911	1912	1913	1914	1915	1916	1917	1918
Total Fertility Rate in Slovakia	4.63	4.56	4.13	3.7	3.28	2.85	2.43	3.03

1.45 children born/woman (2021 est.) Country comparison to the world: 211th

==== Mother's mean age at first birth ====
27.2 years (2019 est.)

=== Life expectancy ===
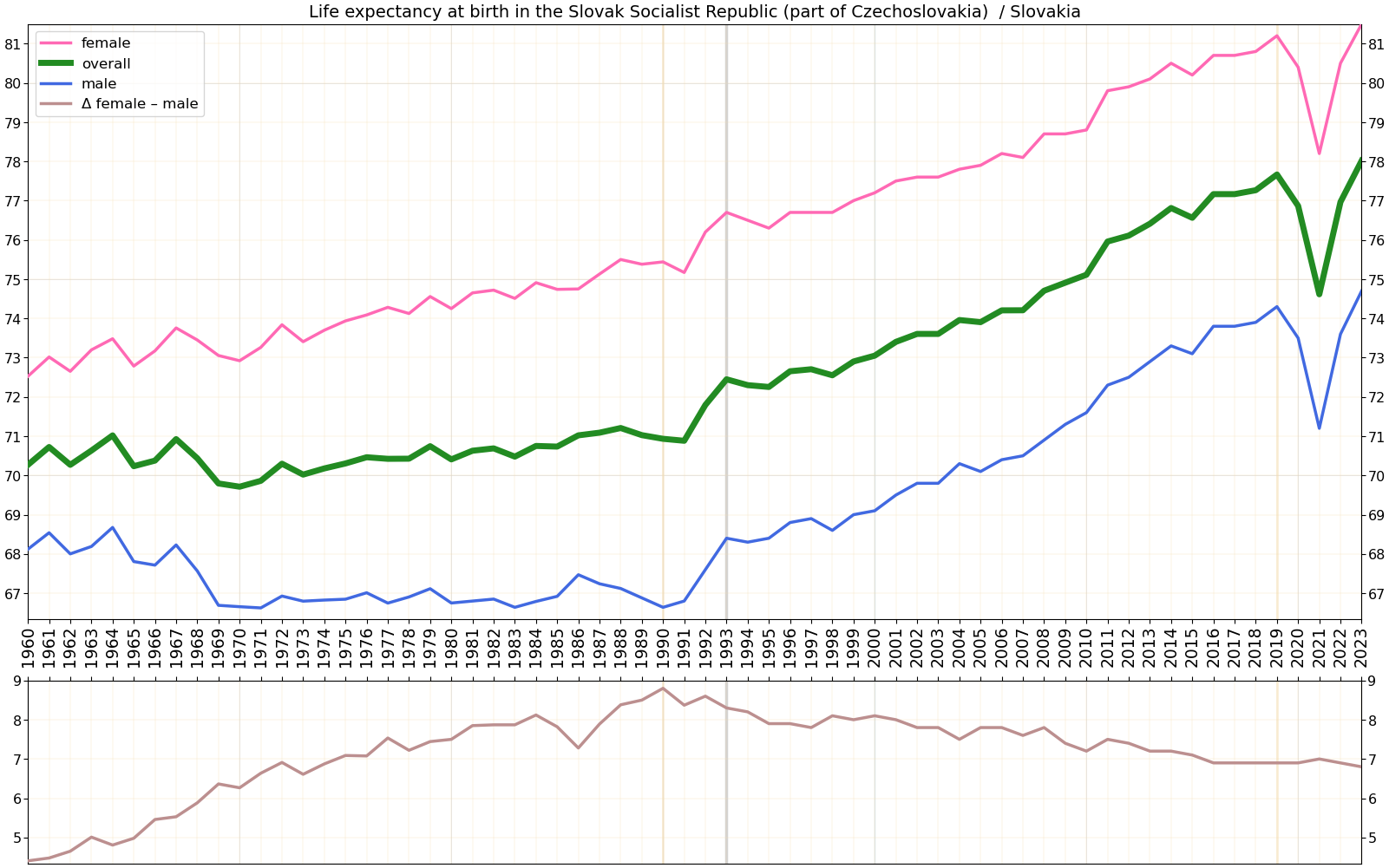
Life expectancy at birth in Slovakia

total population: 78.07 years
male: 74.56 years
female: 81.82 years (2021 est.)

=== Age structure ===
0–14 years: 15.13% (male 423,180 /female 400,128)
15–24 years: 10.06% (male 280,284 /female 266,838)
25–54 years: 44.61% (male 1,228,462 /female 1,198,747)
55–64 years: 13.15% (male 342,142 /female 373,452)
65 years and over: 17.05% (male 366,267 /female 561,120) (2020 est.)

==== Median age ====
total: 41.8 years. Country comparison to the world: 41st
male: 40.1 years
female: 43.6 years (2020 est.)

== Vital statistics ==
	Population (from 1980 December 31)	Live births	Deaths	Natural change	Births (per 1000)	Deaths (per 1000)	Natural change (per 1000)	Crude migration (per 1000)	Fertility rates	Induced abortions
1919	2,940,000	91,729	56,866	34,863	31.2	19.3	11.9		3.64	
1920	3,001,000	97,680	61,084	36,596	32.6	20.4	12.2	8.5	4.25	
1921	3,006,000	114,947	63,507	51,440	38.2	21.1	17.1	−15.4	4.96	
1922	3,046,000	111,059	62,902	48,157	36.5	20.7	15.8	−2.5	4.67	
1923	3,095,000	111,070	54,176	56,894	35.9	17.5	18.4	−2.5	4.55	
1924	3,135,000	106,062	56,322	49,740	33.8	18.0	15.9	−2.3	4.25	
1925	3,168,000	102,867	56,171	46,696	32.5	17.7	14.7	−4.2	4.01	
1926	3,202,000	103,955	59,701	44,254	32.5	18.6	13.8	−3.1	3.98	
1927	3,232,000	99,891	59,172	40,719	30.9	18.3	12.6	−3.2	3.76	
1928	3,258,000	99,673	58,320	41,353	30.6	17.9	12.7	−4.7	3.69	
1929	3,286,000	95,387	56,447	38,940	29.0	17.2	11.9	−3.3	3.48	
1930	3,315,000	96,898	52,268	44,630	29.2	15.8	13.5	−4.7	3.49	
1931	3,350,000	93,309	54,273	39,036	27.9	16.2	11.7	−1.1	3.33	
1932	3,388,000	93,140	52,992	40,148	27.5	15.6	11.9	−0.6	3.29	
1933	3,424,000	84,975	50,655	34,320	24.8	14.8	10.0	0.6	2.96	
1934	3,456,000	83,493	50,178	33,315	24.2	14.5	9.6	−0.3	2.86	
1935	3,486,000	82,382	49,830	32,552	23.6	14.3	9.3	−0.6	2.8	
1936	3,515,000	80,923	48,547	32,376	23.0	13.8	9.2	−0.6	2.79	
1937	3,540,000	79,862	49,527	30,335	22.6	14.0	8.6	−1.5	2.77	
1938	3,726,000	80,800	49,700	31,100	21.7	13.3	8.3	44.2	2.8	
1939	3,577,000	81,200	48,800	32,400	22.7	13.6	9.1	−49.1	2.83	
1940	3,553,000	85,300	52,900	32,400	24.0	14.9	9.1	15.8	2.87	
1941	3,542,000	85,700	53,600	32,100	24.2	15.1	9.1	−12.2	2.9	
1942	3,523,000	87,200	55,900	31,300	24.8	15.9	8.9	−14.3	2.93	
1943	3,503,000	87,700	50,900	36,800	25.0	14.5	10.5	−16.2	2.96	
1944	3,484,000	91,600	58,100	33,500	26.3	16.7	9.6	−15.0	3	
1945	3,459,000	81,880	67,505	14,375	23.7	19.5	4.2	−11.4	3.03	
1946	3,392,000	82,204	47,589	34,615	24.2	14.0	10.2	−29.6	3.09	
1947	3,399,000	87,659	41,491	46,168	25.8	12.2	13.6	−11.5	3.21	
1948	3,446,000	91,189	40,873	50,316	26.5	11.9	14.6	−0.8	3.24	
1949	3,447,000	91,053	41,727	49,326	26.4	12.1	14.3	−14.0	3.28	
1950	3,463,000	99,721	39,668	60,053	28.8	11.5	17.4	−12.8	3.56	
1951	3,509,000	100,663	40,505	60,158	28.5	11.5	17.0	−3.7	3.58	
1952	3,558,000	100,824	36,897	63,927	28.0	10.2	17.7	−3.7	3.57	
1953	3,599,000	99,124	35,598	63,526	26.9	9.7	17.3	−5.8	3.50	
1954	3,661,000	98,310	34,866	63,444	26.2	9.3	16.9	0.3	3.45	
1955	3,727,000	99,305	32,917	66,388	26.0	8.6	17.4	0.6	3.47	
1956	3,787,000	99,467	32,815	66,652	25.5	8.4	17.1	−1.0	3.46	
1957	3,844,000	97,311	35,755	61,556	24.5	9.0	15.5	−0.4	3.34	
1958	3,900,000	93,272	32,106	61,166	23.1	7.9	15.1	−0.5	3.25	12,383
1959	3,946,000	87,991	34,077	53,914	21.5	8.3	13.1	−1.3	3.07	17,217
1960	3,994,000	88,412	31,609	56,803	22.1	7.9	14.2	−2.0	3.08	20,738
1961	4,182,000	87,359	31,403	55,956	21.6	7.8	13.8	33.3	3.04	24,244
1962	4,238,000	83,899	34,398	49,501	19.8	8.1	11.7	1.7	2.84	23,784
1963	4,282,000	87,158	32,978	54,180	20.4	7.7	12.7	−2.3	2.95	19,076
1964	4,327,000	86,878	32,875	54,003	20.1	7.6	12.5	−2.0	2.91	19,174
1965	4,371,000	84,257	35,910	48,347	19.3	8.2	11.1	−0.9	2.80	21,037
1966	4,412,000	81,453	36,357	45,096	18.5	8.2	10.2	−0.8	2.68	24,445
1967	4,449,000	77,537	35,458	42,079	17.4	8.0	9.5	−1.1	2.50	26,571
1968	4,484,000	76,370	38,076	38,294	17.0	8.5	8.5	−0.6	2.40	27,398
1969	4,519,000	79,769	40,623	39,146	17.7	9.0	8.7	−0.9	2.43	28,534
1970	4,550,000	80,666	42,240	38,426	17.7	9.3	8.4	−1.5	2.40	27,873
1971	4,557,000	83,062	42,856	40,206	18.2	9.4	8.8	−7.3	2.42	28,619
1972	4,597,000	87,794	41,410	46,384	19.1	9.0	10.1	−1.3	2.49	26,213
1973	4,641,000	92,953	43,759	49,194	20.0	9.4	10.6	−1.0	2.56	25,335
1974	4,690,000	97,585	44,934	52,651	20.8	9.6	11.2	−0.6	2.60	26,086
1975	4,739,000	97,649	45,248	52,401	20.6	9.5	11.1	−0.7	2.53	26,160
1976	4,790,000	99,814	45,420	54,394	20.8	9.5	11.4	−0.6	2.52	27,700
1977	4,841,000	99,533	47,181	52,352	20.6	9.7	10.8	−0.2	2.47	27,875
1978	4,890,000	100,193	47,778	52,415	20.5	9.8	10.7	−0.6	2.45	28,641
1979	4,939,000	100,240	47,837	52,403	20.3	9.7	10.6	−0.6	2.44	29,981
1980	4,996,000	95,100	50,579	44,521	19.1	10.1	8.9	2.6	2.31	31,240
1981	5,036,000	93,290	49,632	43,658	18.6	9.9	8.7	−0.7	2.28	31,943
1982	5,074,000	92,618	50,393	42,225	18.3	10.0	8.4	−0.9	2.26	33,107
1983	5,110,000	92,053	52,433	39,620	18.1	10.3	7.8	−0.7	2.27	33,625
1984	5,145,000	90,843	51,739	39,104	17.7	10.1	7.6	−0.8	2.25	34,268
1985	5,179,000	90,155	52,464	37,691	17.5	10.2	7.3	−0.7	2.26	36,283
1986	5,209,000	87,138	53,233	33,905	16.8	10.3	6.5	−0.7	2.20	40,624
1987	5,237,000	84,006	52,980	31,026	16.1	10.1	5.9	−0.5	2.18	49,690
1988	5,264,000	83,242	52,475	30,767	15.9	10.0	5.9	−0.7	2.15	51,000
1989	5,288,000	80,116	53,902	26,214	15.2	10.2	5.0	−0.4	2.08	48,602
1990	5,311,000	79,989	54,619	25,370	15.1	10.3	4.8	−0.5	2.09	48,437
1991	5,296,000	78,569	54,618	23,951	14.9	10.3	4.5	−7.3	2.05	45,902
1992	5,314,000	74,640	53,423	21,217	14.1	10.1	4.0	−0.6	1.99	42,626
1993	5,336,000	73,256	52,707	20,549	13.8	9.9	3.9	0.2	1.93	38,815
1994	5,356,000	66,370	51,386	14,984	12.4	9.6	2.8	0.9	1.67	34,883
1995	5,368,000	61,427	52,686	8,741	11.5	9.8	1.6	0.6	1.52	29,409
1996	5,379,000	60,123	51,236	8,887	11.2	9.5	1.7	0.3	1.47	25,173
1997	5,388,000	59,310	52,080	7,230	11.0	9.7	1.3	0.4	1.43	22,318
1998	5,393,000	57,582	53,156	4,426	10.7	9.9	0.8	0.1	1.37	21,109
1999	5,399,000	56,223	52,402	3,821	10.4	9.7	0.7	0.4	1.33	19,949
2000	5,403,000	55,151	52,724	2,427	10.2	9.8	0.4	0.3	1.30	18,468
2001	5,379,000	51,136	51,980	−844	9.5	9.7	−0.2	−4.2	1.20	18,026
2002	5,379,000	50,841	51,532	−691	9.5	9.6	−0.1	0.1	1.19	17,382
2003	5,380,000	51,713	52,230	−517	9.6	9.7	−0.1	0.3	1.20	16,222
2004	5,385,000	53,747	51,852	1,895	10.0	9.6	0.4	0.5	1.25	15,307
2005	5,389,000	54,430	53,475	955	10.1	9.9	0.2	0.5	1.27	14,427
2006	5,394,000	53,904	53,301	603	10.0	9.9	0.1	0.8	1.26	14,243
2007	5,401,000	54,424	53,856	568	10.1	10.0	0.1	1.2	1.27	13,424
2008	5,412,000	57,360	53,164	4,196	10.6	9.8	0.8	1.2	1.34	13,394
2009	5,425,000	61,217	52,913	8,304	11.3	9.8	1.5	0.9	1.44	13,240
2010	5,435,000	60,410	53,445	6,965	11.1	9.8	1.3	0.5	1.43	12,582
2011	5,404,000	60,813	51,903	8,910	11.3	9.6	1.7	−7.4	1.45	11,789
2012	5,411,000	55,535	52,437	3,098	10.3	9.7	0.6	0.7	1.34	11,214
2013	5,416,000	54,823	52,089	2,734	10.1	9.6	0.5	0.4	1.34	11,105
2014	5,421,000	55,033	51,346	3,687	10.2	9.5	0.7	0.2	1.37	10,582
2015	5,426,000	55,604	53,826	1,778	10.3	9.9	0.4	0.5	1.40	10,058
2016	5,435,000	57,557	52,351	5,206	10.6	9.6	1.0	0.7	1.48	9,390
2017	5,443,000	57,969	53,914	4,055	10.7	9.9	0.8	0.7	1.52	9,083
2018	5,450,000	57,639	54,293	3,346	10.6	10.0	0.6	0.7	1.54	9,039
2019	5,458,000	57,054	53,234	3,820	10.5	9.8	0.7	1.4	1.57	6,682
2020	5,459,781	56,650	59,089	−2,439	10.4	10.8	−0.4	0.8	1.59	6,180
2021	5,434,712	56,565	73,461	−16,896	10.4	13.5	−3.1	−1.5	1.63	5,552
2022	5,428,800	52,668	59,583	−6,915	9.7	11.0	−1.3	0.2	1.57	5,891
2023	5,424,687	48,627	54,133	−5,506	9.0	10.0	−1.0	0.3	1.49	5,910
2024	5,419,451	46,241	53,876	−7,635	8.5	10.0	−1.4	0.4	1.46	5,518
2025	5,409,407	42,019	53,520	−11,501	7.8	9.88	−2.1	0.27	1.37	5,290
2026									1.34 (e)	

=== Current vital statistics ===
Period	Live births	Deaths	Natural increase
January—August 2025	28,239	35,832	–7,593
January—August 2026	27,403	35,165	–7,762
Difference	▼ –836 (-3.0%)	▼ –667 (-1.9%)	▼–169

=== Total fertility rates by region ===
2022
Regions	TFR
Banská Bystrica Region	1.51
Stredné Slovensko	1.50
Žilina Region	1.50
Bratislava Region	1.44
Trnava Region	1.42
Nitra Region	1.41
Western Slovakia	1.39
Trenčín Region	1.35

=== Structure of the population ===
Population Estimates by Sex and Age Group (01.I.2021):

Age Group	Male	Female	Total	%
Total	2 666 486	2 793 295	5 459 781	100
0–4	151 050	143 932	294 982	5.40
5–9	148 703	141 292	289 995	5.31
10–14	145 175	138 142	283 317	5.19
15–19	134 762	127 412	262 174	4.80
20–24	146 693	139 514	286 207	5.24
25–29	178 989	171 583	350 572	6.42
30–34	205 583	197 417	403 000	7.38
35–39	223 148	210 774	433 922	7.95
40–44	233 997	219 935	453 932	8.31
45–49	210 693	203 524	414 217	7.59
50–54	172 944	172 772	345 716	6.33
55–59	174 312	181 729	356 041	6.52
60–64	167 771	185 911	353 682	6.48
65−69	150 908	184 068	334 976	6.14
70−74	103 829	143 803	247 632	4.54
75−79	59 778	100 517	160 295	2.94
80−84	34 122	69 918	104 040	1.91
85−89	16 505	40 150	56 655	1.04
90−94	5 395	15 678	21 073	0.39
95−99	1 462	4 076	5 538	0.10
100+	667	1 148	1 815	0.03
Age group	Male	Female	Total	Percent
0–14	444 928	423 366	868 294	15.90
15–64	1 848 892	1 810 571	3 659 463	67.03
65+	372 666	559 358	932 024	17.07

== Languages ==
Slovak (official) 81.77%, Hungarian 8.48%, Roma 1.84%, Rusyn 0.71%, other or unspecified 7.2% (2021 census)

== Ethnic groups ==
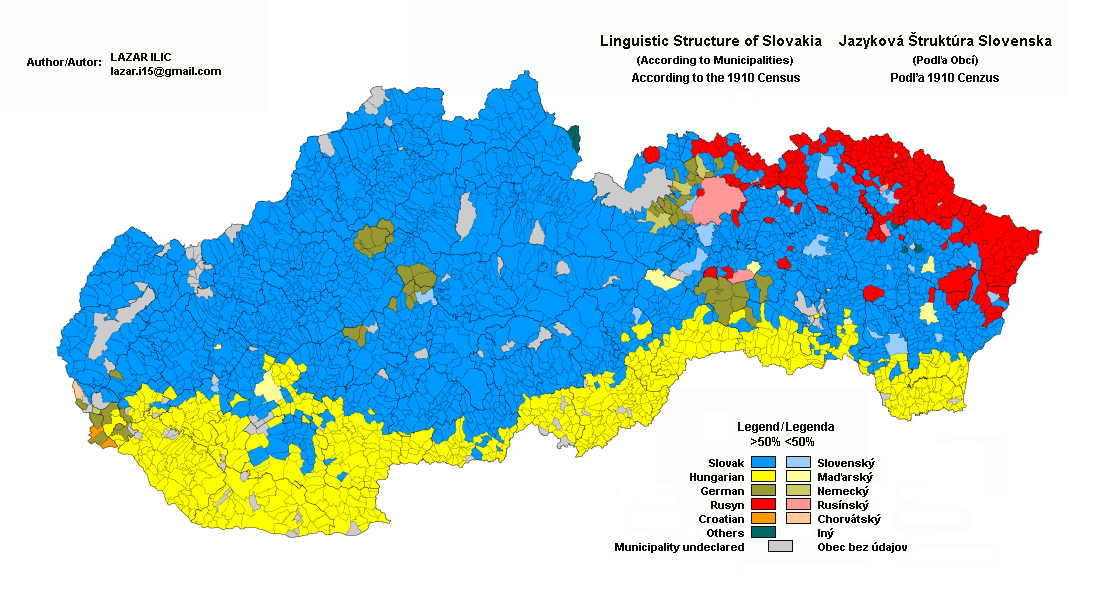
Linguistic composition within the territory of modern Slovakia in 1910

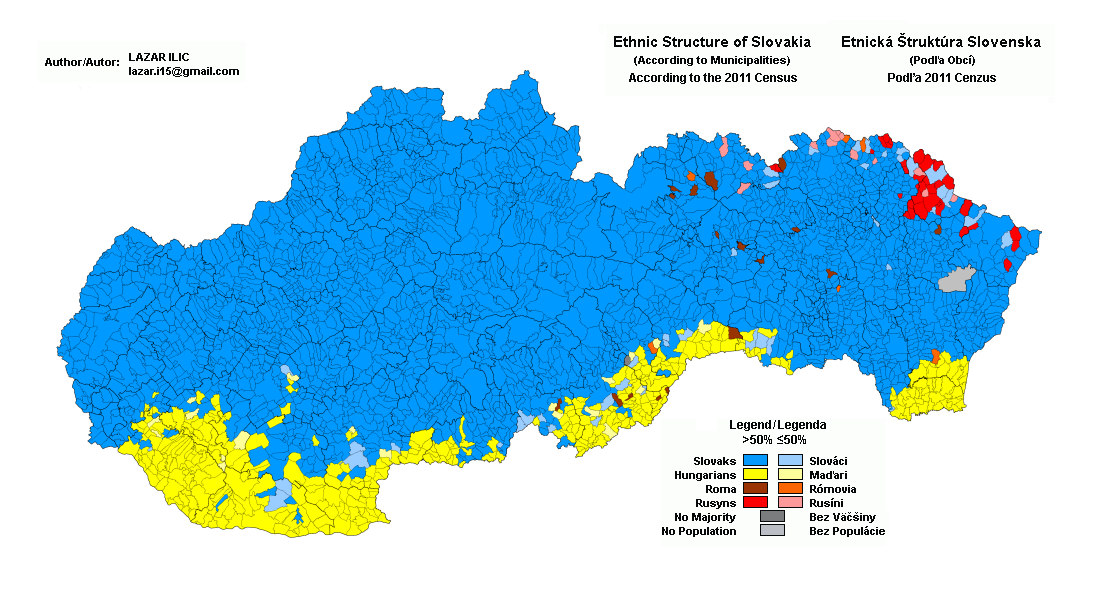
Ethnic structure of Slovakia according to Census 2011

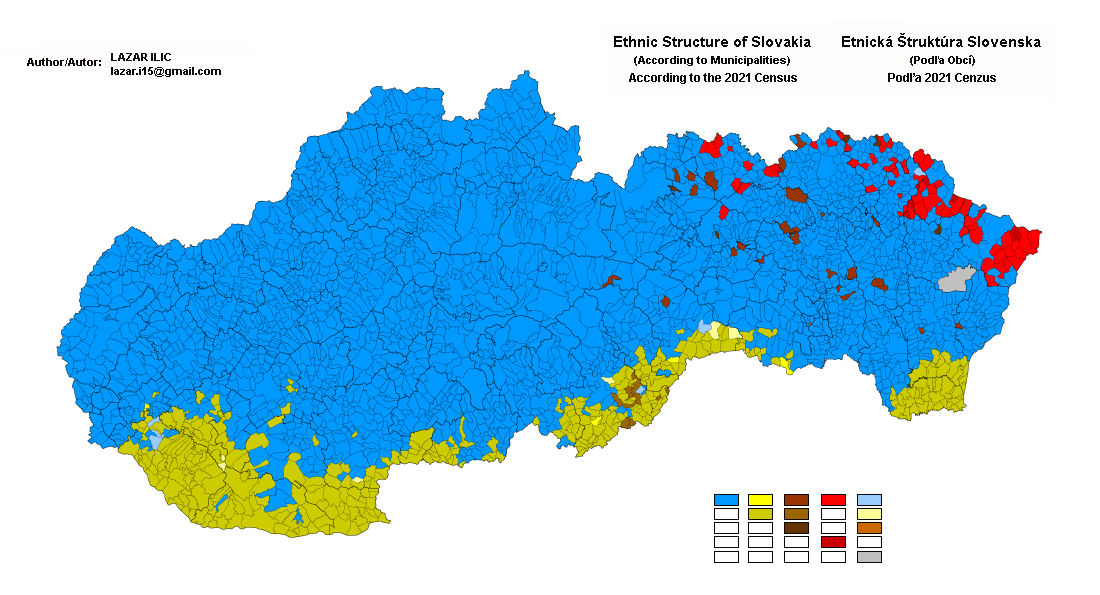
Ethnic structure of Slovakia in 2021

The majority of the 5.4 million inhabitants of Slovakia are Slovak (83.82%). Hungarians are the largest ethnic minority (7.75%) and are concentrated in the southern and eastern regions of Slovakia. Other ethnic groups include Roma (1.23%), Czechs, Croats, Rusyns, Ukrainians, Germans, Poles, Gorals, Serbs, and Jews (about 2,300 remain of the estimated pre-WWII population of 120,000).

While both international organizations (the United Nations and the World Bank) and the official Slovak statistics office offer population figures for ethnic groups, these figures seldom come close to agreement. Figures for the Roma population (for a variety of reasons) vary between 1% and 10% of the population. In the most recent survey carried out by the Slovak Government's Roma Plenipotentiary, the figure for the percentage of Roma was arrived at through interview with municipality representatives and mayors, according to how many Roma they think live in their jurisdictions. The figure arrived at by this means was in the region of 300,000 (about 5.6%). Note that in the case of the 5.6%, however, the above percentages of Hungarians and Slovaks are lower accordingly.

Population of Slovakia according to ethnic group at censuses 1950–2021
Ethnic group	1950		1961		1970		1980		1991		2001		2011		2021	
Ethnic group	Number	%	Number	%	Number	%	Number	%	Number	%	Number	%	Number	%	Number	%
Slovaks		86.6		85.3		85.5	4,317,008	86.5	4,519,328	85.7	4,614,854	85.8	4,352,775	80.7	4,567,547	83.82
Hungarians		10.3		12.4		12.2	559,490	11.2	567,296	10.8	520,528	9.7	458,467	8.5	422,065	7.75
Romani^{1}		–		–		–	–	–	75,802	1.4	89,920	1.7	105,738	2.0	67,179	1.23
Czechs		1.2		1.1		1.0	57,197	1.1	59,326	1.1	44,620	0.8	30,367	0.6	28,996	0.54
Rusyns		1.4		–		0.9	36,850	0.7	17,197	0.3	24,201	0.4	33,482	0.6	23,746	0.40
Ukrainians		1.4		–		0.9	36,850	0.7	13,281	0.3	10,814	0.2	7,430	0.1	9,451	0.21
Others		0.5		1.2		0.4	20,623	0.4	22,105	0.4	74,518	1.4	26,284	0.5	34,728	0.62
Unknown		0.5		1.2		0.4	20,623	0.4	22,105	0.4	74,518	1.4	382,493	7.1	295,558	5.43
Total	3,442,317		4,174,046		4,537,290		4,991,168		5,274,335		5,379,455		5,397,036		5,450,421	
^{1} Before 1991 the Romani were not recognized as a separate ethnic group

The official state language is Slovak, and Hungarian is widely spoken in the southern regions.

Despite its modern European economy and society, Slovakia has a significant rural element. About 45% of Slovaks live in villages with fewer than 5,000 inhabitants, and 14% in villages with fewer than 1,000.

== Immigration ==
Foreign residents:

	2023	2024	2025
Total	294,607	327,372	342,048
Ukraine	165,041	187,719	201,116
Serbia	19,065	19,067	16,240
(European Union) Czechia	12,702	12,742	12,441
Vietnam	8,448	9,655	11,179
(European Union) Hungary	9,606	9,754	9,759
Russia	8,092	8,674	8,850
(European Union) Romania	6,756	6,586	6,411
(European Union) Poland	6,072	6,054	5,994
India	2,586	3,992	5,732
Georgia	4,245	5,760	4,676
(European Union) Germany	4,497	4,472	4,451
China	2,791	3,016	3,323
(European Union) Italy	2,977	3,067	3,252
North Macedonia	3,510	3,689	3,211
United Kingdom	2,706	2,707	2,591
(European Union) Austria	2,580	2,599	2,574
Belarus	1,319	1,723	1,814
Kyrgyzstan	1,033	1,462	1,717
South Korea	1,497	1,569	1,619
Turkey	1,176	1,436	1,546
(European Union) Bulgaria	1,602	1,546	1,531
Kazakhstan	1,223	1,389	1,525
(European Union) France	1,540	1,518	1,468
United States	1,147	1,368	1,379
Bosnia and Herzegovina	1,753	1,708	1,365
Albania	1,224	1,671	1,346
(European Union) Spain	1,184	1,151	1,090
(European Union) Croatia	1,100	1,081	1,067
Others/undeclared	15,416	19,022	21,645

Slovakia net migration, 1993–2024
Year	Immigrants	Emigrants	Net migration
1993	9,106	7,355	1,751
1995	3,055	213	2,842
1996	2,477	222	2,255
1997	2,303	572	1,731
1998	2,052	746	1,306
1999	2,072	618	1,454
2000	2,274	811	1,463
2001	2,023	1,011	1,012
2002	2,312	1,411	901
2003	2,603	1,194	1,409
2004	4,460	1,586	2,874
2005	5,276	1,873	3,403
2006	5,589	1,735	3,854
2007	8,624	1,831	6,793
2008	8,765	1,705	7,060
2009	6,346	1,979	4,367
2010	5,272	1,889	3,383
2011	4,829	1,863	2,966
2012	5,419	2,003	3,416
2013	5,149	2,770	2,379
2014	5,357	3,644	1,713
2015	6,997	3,870	3,127
2016	7,686	3,801	3,885
2017	7,188	3,466	3,722
2018	7,253	3,298	3,955
2019	7,016	3,384	3,632
2020	6,775	2,428	4,347
2021	5,733	3,395	2,338
2022	5,463	4,468	995
2023	5,923	4,522	1,401
2024	6,824	4,425	2,399
2025	6,377	4,920	1,457

== Religion ==
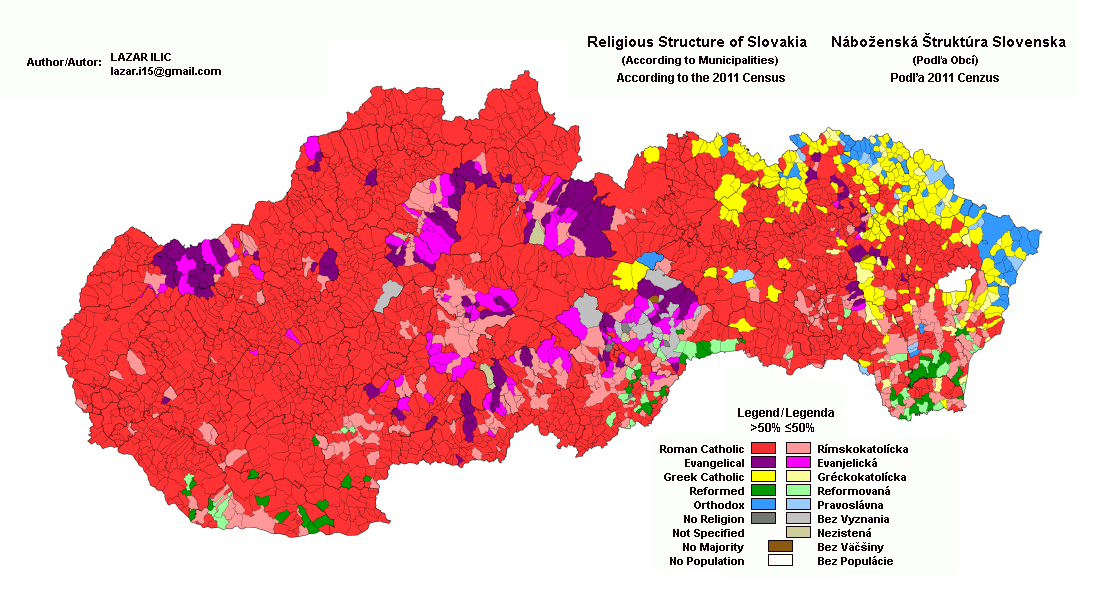
Religious structure of Slovakia in 2011

The Slovak constitution guarantees freedom of religion. At the 2021 census, the majority of Slovak citizens (55.76%) practise Roman Catholicism; the second-largest group consider themselves Irreligious (23.79%). About 5.27% are Protestants, 4% are Greek Catholics, 1.56% are Reformed Christian, and 0.93% are Orthodox.

== See also ==
- Roma in Slovakia
