= Bratislava Region =

Region of Slovakia

Coordinates: 48°08′38″N 17°06′35″E

Bratislava Region Bratislavský kraj
- Region
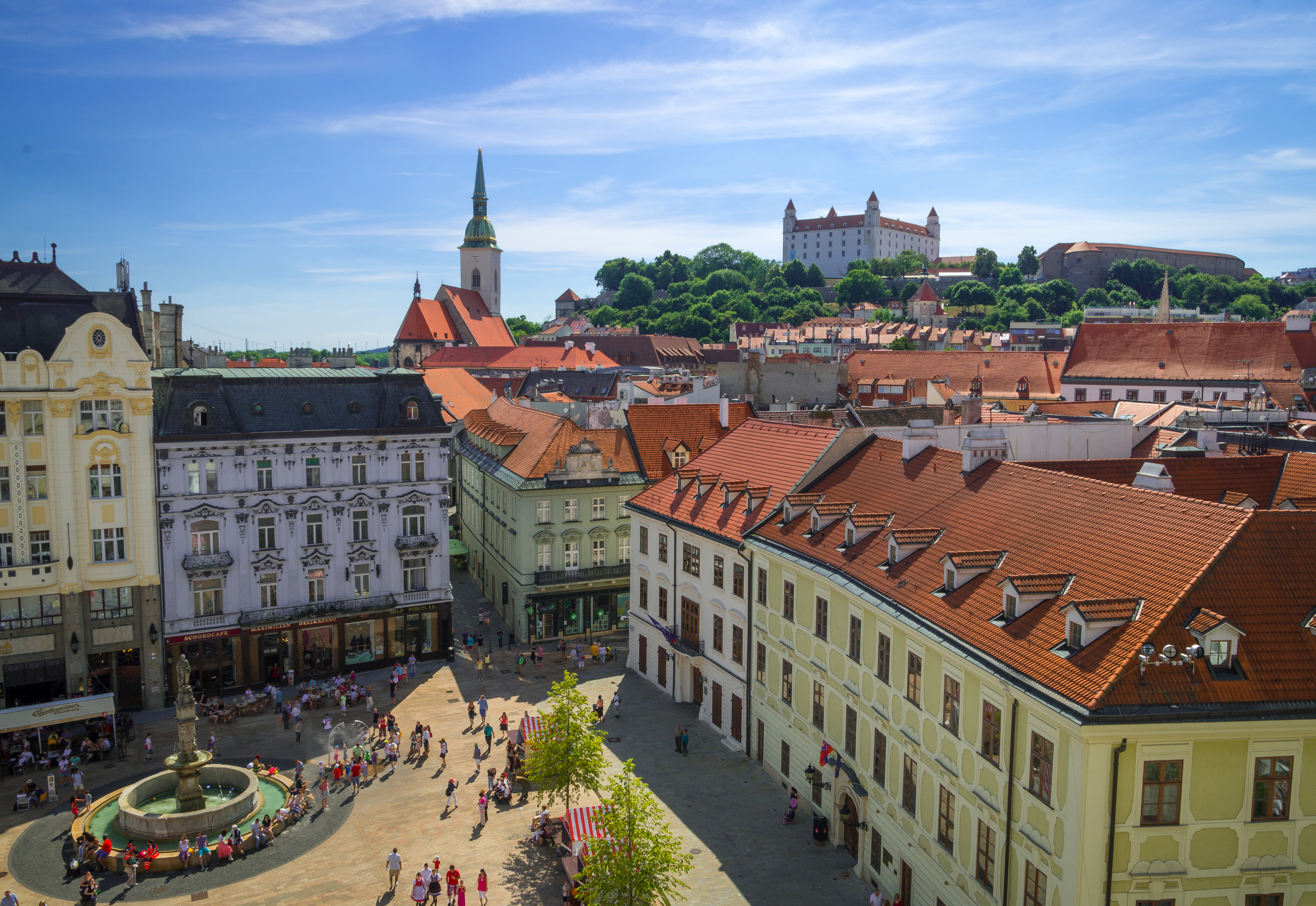

- Flag Coat of arms

- Country: Slovakia
- Capital: Bratislava

Government
  - Body: Regional Council of Bratislava Region
  - Governor: Juraj Droba (SaS)

Area
  - Total: 2,052.60 km^{2} (792.51 sq mi)
- Highest elevation: 754 m (2,474 ft)
- Lowest elevation: 123 m (404 ft)

Population (2025)
  - Total: 739,635

GDP
  - Total: €36.497 billion (2024)
  - Per capita: €49,588 (2024)
- Time zone: UTC+1 (CET)
  - Summer (DST): UTC+2 (CEST)
- ISO 3166 code: SK-BL
- HDI (2023): 0.967 very high · 1st
- Website: bratislavskykraj.sk

The Bratislava Region (Note: (Slovak: Bratislavský kraj, pronounced [ˈbracislawskiː ˈkraj]; German: Pressburger/Bratislavaer Landschaftsverband (until 1919); Hungarian: Pozsonyi kerület)) (German: Pressburger Landschaftsverband, Hungarian: Pozsonyi kerület) is one of the administrative regions of Slovakia. Its capital is Bratislava. The region was first established in 1923 and its present borders exist from 1996. It is the smallest of the eight regions of Slovakia as well as the most urbanized, most developed and most productive by GDP per capita.

== Geography ==
The region is located in the south-western part of Slovakia and has an area of 2052.60 km^{2}. The region is split by the Little Carpathians which start in Bratislava and continue north-eastwards; these mountains separate two lowlands, the Záhorie lowland in the west and the fertile Danubian Lowland in the east, which grows mainly wheat and maize. Major rivers in the region are the Morava River, the Danube and the Little Danube; the last of these, together with the Danube, encircle the Žitný ostrov in the south-east. There are three protected landscape areas in the region: the Little Carpathians, Záhorie and Dunajské luhy. The region borders Trnava Region in the north and east, Győr-Moson-Sopron county in Hungary in the south, Burgenland in Austria in the south-west and Lower Austria in the west.

== History ==
The first known permanent settlement of the area of today's Bratislava was the Linear Pottery Culture, around 5000 BC in the Neolithic era. Around 200 BC, the Celtic Boii tribe established the Bratislava oppidum on the site of today's Bratislava Castle. The Romans established their camp Gerulata on the right bank of the Danube in the 1st century and remained there until the 4th century. The area was part of the Principality of Nitra and later, in the 9th century, of Great Moravia. From the 10th century onwards, it became part of the Principality of Hungary (later the Kingdom of Hungary) and almost the whole area was part of Pozsony county (the exception being three villages south of Bratislava which were part of Moson county). After the break-up of Austria-Hungary in 1918, region was newly defined in 1923 and present Bratislava region approximately copies its 1923 borders. Bratislava Regio was abolished in 1928 and replaced by a new territorial unit called the "Slovak Land". During the WWII Slovak Republic, Bratislava county was restored, albeit with somewhat modified borders. After the restoration of Czechoslovakia, the pre-breakup status was restored. From 1949 to 1960 a unit named Bratislava Region existed, but it was replaced in 1960 by the Western Slovak Region (except from 1 July 1969 to 28 December 1970; Bratislava was partly separate from 1968, and from 1971 it was a separate region). After abolition of the regions in 1990, the current system was introduced in 1996. Since the administrative regions became autonomous in 2002, it has been governed by the Bratislava Self-Governing Region.

== Population ==
Historical population
Year	Pop.	±%
1970	459,975	—
1980	543,800	+18.2%
1991	606,351	+11.5%
2001	599,015	−1.2%
2011	602,436	+0.6%
2021	719,537	+19.4%
Source: Censuses

Population statistic (10 years)
Year	1995	2005	2015	2025
Count	618,290	603,699	633,288	739,635
Difference		−2.35%	+4.90%	+16.79%

Population statistic
Year	2024	2025
Count	736,385	739,635
Difference		+0.44%

It has a population of 739,635 people (31 December 2025).

Although it is the smallest region of Slovakia by area, it does not have the lowest population. The largest city is Bratislava (480,902) and the second largest is Pezinok (24,340).

=== Ethnicity ===
Census 2021 (1+ %)
Ethnicity	Number	Fraction
Slovak	626,085	87.01%
Not found out	59,536	8.27%
Hungarian	24,516	3.4%
Czech	10,420	1.44%
Total	719,537	

In year 2021 was 719,537 people by ethnicity 626,085 as Slovak, 59,536 as Not found out, 24,516 as Hungarian, 10,420 as Czech, 6252 as Other, 2891 as Rusyn, 2420 as German, 2251 as Ukrainian, 2131 as Russian, 1538 as Romani, 1259 as Croatian, 1104 as Vietnamese, 924 as Polish, 790 as Italian, 761 as Serbian, 746 as Bulgarian, 714 as Jewish, 607 as French, 578 as Romanian, 566 as Moravian, 530 as Austrian, 473 as Chinese, 344 as Albanian, 287 as Greek, 223 as English, 172 as Canadian, 160 as Turkish, 127 as Irish, 119 as Korean, 57 as Iranian and 49 as Silesian.

Note on population: The difference values of population numbers in the table "Population statistic" and in the sections "Ethnicity" & "Religion" is caused by the use of various statistical methods.

=== Religion ===
Census 2021 (1+ %)
Religion	Number	Fraction
Roman Catholic Church	306,703	42.63%
None	286,730	39.85%
Not found out	60,294	8.38%
Evangelical Church	29,615	4.12%
Greek Catholic Church	7933	1.1%
Total	719,537	

In year 2021 was 719,537 people by religion 306,703 from Roman Catholic Church, 286,730 from None, 60,294 from Not found out, 29,615 from Evangelical Church, 7933 from Greek Catholic Church, 3788 from Eastern Orthodox Church, 3526 from Ad hoc movements, 3505 from Other, 2551 from Calvinist Church, 2215 from Christian Congregations in Slovakia, 2013 from Other and not ascertained christian church, 1862 from Buddhism, 1609 from Jehovah's Witnesses, 1181 from Islam, 1017 from Baptists Church, 916 from Apostolic Church, 881 from Church of the Brethren, 839 from Jewish community, 705 from Paganism and natural spirituality, 399 from United Methodist Church, 353 from Seventh-day Adventist Church, 274 from Old Catholic Church, 241 from Hinduism, 183 from Czechoslovak Hussite Church, 120 from Bahá'i Community, 75 from Church of Jesus Christ of Latter-day Saints and 9 from New Apostolic Church.

== Economy ==
The economy of the Bratislava Region accounts for about a quarter(EUR 20 billion) of the Slovak GDP. Bratislava has one of the highest GDP per capita at PPP of among whole E.U. €51,200 (~$70,000). It is marked by a strong tertiary sector, while the primary sector has a share of only around 1% and the secondary sector around 20%. Important branches include chemical, automobile, machine, electrotechnical and food industries.

== Politics ==
The current governor of the Bratislava region is Juraj Droba (SaS). He won with 20.4&%. In the 2017 election, the regional parliament was elected as well:

Regional Council of Bratislava region

Type
- Type: Unicameral
- Houses: Regional Council

Leadership
- Governor: Juraj Droba, SaS

Structure
- Seats: 53
- Political groups: Liberal group (27) (Note: SaS, PS, Team Bratislava) Mayors for region (13) (Note: I am Slovakia (6) STANK (2) Tím Ružinov (2) Independent (2) Voice (1)) Independent group (9) Non-affiliated (4) (Note: Independent (2) Alliance (1) Good Choice (1))

Elections
- Last election: 29 October 2022

Meeting place
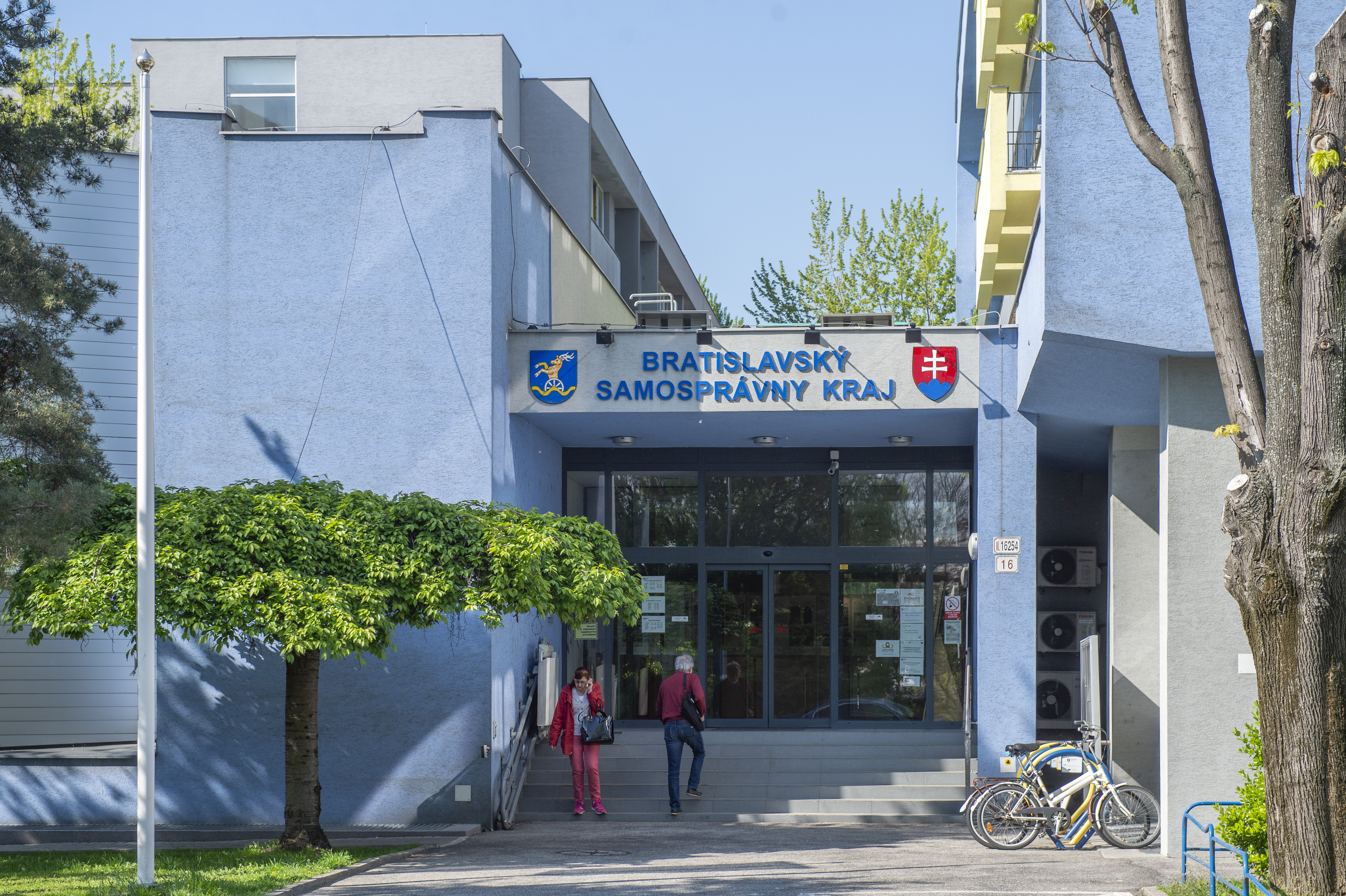
- Governor's office, Bratislava

Website
- Council of Bratislava region

=== 2022 elections ===
Droba (SaS) won the 2022 governor's elections against several other candidates.

Summary of the 29 October 2022 regional election results in Bratislava region
Candidates	2022 Results	
Candidates	%	Votes
Juraj Droba (Liberal (Note: SaS, PS, TB))	63.60	136 983
Ján Mažgút (Nationalist (Note: Direction, SNS))	13.42	28 911
Ivan Bošňák (Centre-right (Note: Together, Chance, ODS, DS))	8.56	18 445
Dušan Velič (Centre-right (Note: KDH, ZĽ, SR, MF))	8.08	17 420
Others	6.29	13 592
Total		219 179

=== 2017 elections ===
Droba (SaS) won the 2017 governor's elections against several other candidates.

Political party	Seats won	+/-	Percentage	Electoral leader
Independents	25	▲19	50.00%	Martin Zaťovič
Centre-right coalition	17	▼5	34.00%	Elena Pätoprstá
Coalition led by Smer–SD	6	▼8	12.00%	Vladimír Bajan
Doma Dobre	1	▲1	2.00%	Peter Tydlitát
Nezávislé fórum	1	1	2.00%	Alžbeta Ožvaldová

=== 2013 elections ===
Pavol Frešo (SDKÚ–DS) won the 2013 governor's elections over the centre-left candidate Monika Beňová (Smer–SD). Pavol Frešo was also supported by SaS, OKS, Most–Híd, SMK-MKP, KDH and SZ.

Political party	Seats won	+/-	Percentage	Electoral leader
KDH	9	▲1	20.46%	Dušan Pekár
Most–Híd	7	▲6	15.91%	Attila Horváth
SaS	7	▲6	15.91%	Vladimír Sloboda
SDKÚ–DS	6	▼4	13.64%	Ivo Nesrovnal
Independents	6	▲4	13.64%	Rudolf Kusý
SMK-MKP	3	▼2	6.82%	Zuzana Schwartzová
OKS	2	▼1	4.55%	Ondrej Dostál
Smer–SD	1	▼12	2.27%	Peter Fitz
NaS–NS	1	▲1	2.27%	Oskar Dobrovodský
Nezávislé fórum	1	1	2.27%	Marta Černá
ZZ–DÚ	1	▲1	2.27%	Elena Pätoprstá

=== 2009 elections ===
The 2009 regional elections were won by Pavol Frešo (SDKÚ–DS) over the independent candidate Vladimír Bajan. Pavol Frešo was also supported by SaS, OKS, SMK-MKP and KDH.

Political party	Seats won	+/-	Percentage	Electoral leader
Smer–SD	13	▲3	29.55%	Milan Ftáčnik
SDKÚ–DS	10	▼6	22.73%	Ladislav Snopko
KDH	8	▲2	18.18%	Dušan Pekár
SMK-MKP	5	0	11.36%	Zuzana Schwartzová
OKS	3	▲1	6.82%	František Šebej
Independents	2	▼1	4.55%	Rudolf Kusý
ĽS–HZDS	1	▲1	2.27%	Ladislav Balla
Most–Híd	1	New	2.27%	Alžbeta Ožvaldová
SaS	1	New	2.27%	Anna Zemanová

== Administrative division ==
The Bratislava Region consists of 8 districts: Malacky, Pezinok, Senec and 5 districts of Bratislava (Bratislava I – Bratislava V, which form the city of Bratislava).

There are 73 municipalities in the region, of which 7 are towns.

District	Area [km^{2}]	Population
Bratislava I	9.59	47,896
Bratislava II	92.49	127,409
Bratislava III	74.67	78,663
Bratislava IV	96.70	105,236
Bratislava V	94.20	121,698
Malacky	949.51	80,324
Pezinok	375.53	70,096
Senec	359.88	108,313

Population and area values are current for year 2025.

== Places of interest ==
- Bratislava with Bratislava Castle, St Martin's Cathedral, Bridge of the Slovak National Uprising, Grassalkovich Palace etc.
- Devín castle
- Roman military camp Gerulata - inscribed in UNESCO World Heritage List
- Towns with vineyard tradition: Svätý Jur, Modra, Pezinok
- Budmerice chateau
- Červený Kameň Castle
- Sandberg - paleontological site
- Little Carpathians Protected Landscape Area
- Dunajské luhy Protected Landscape Area
- Záhorie Protected Landscape Area

== Photo gallery ==
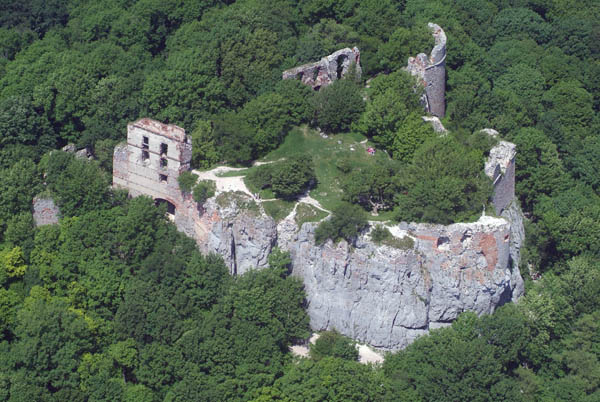
Pajštún Castle

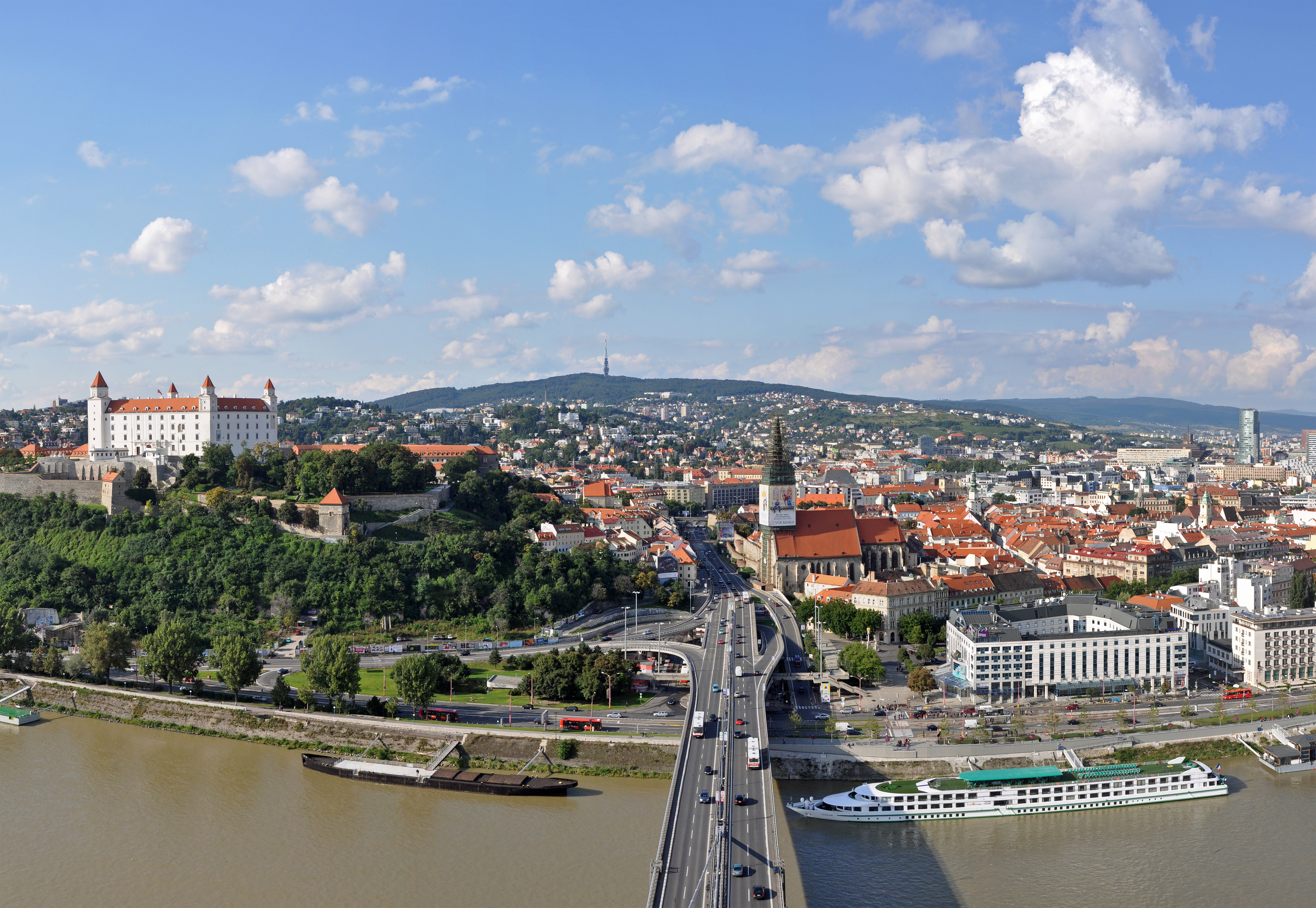
Bratislava

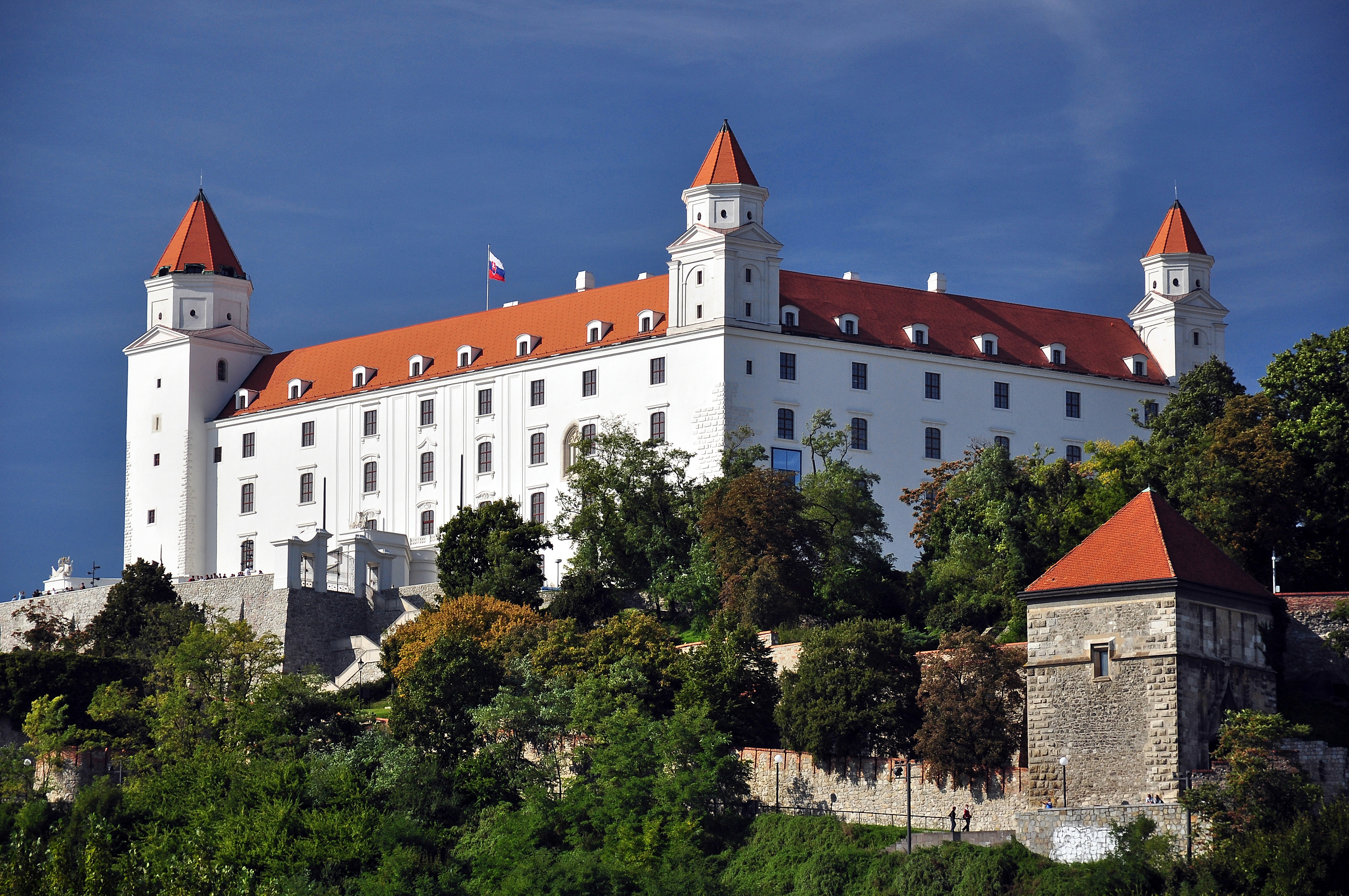
Bratislava Castle

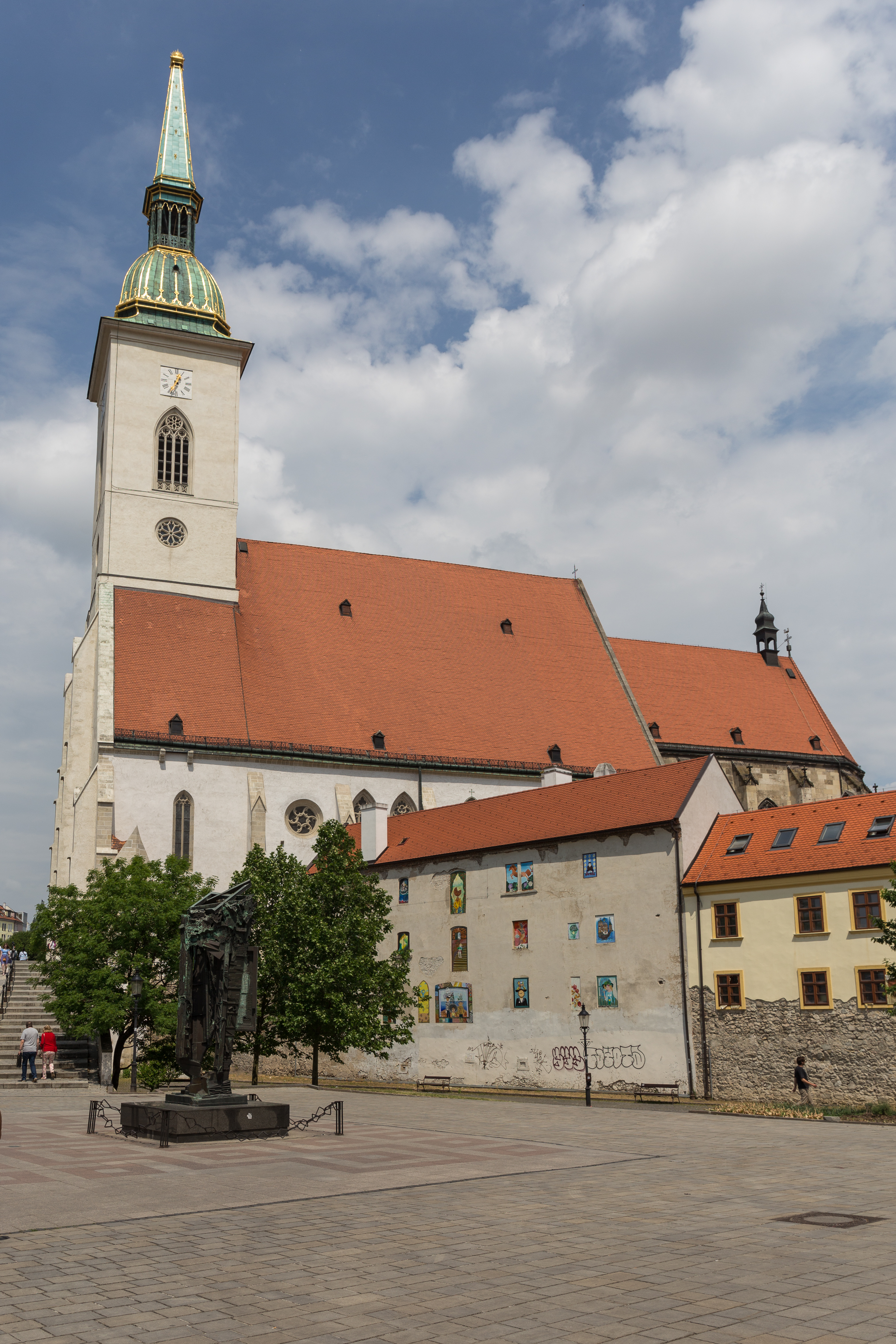
Saint Martin's Cathedral, Bratislava

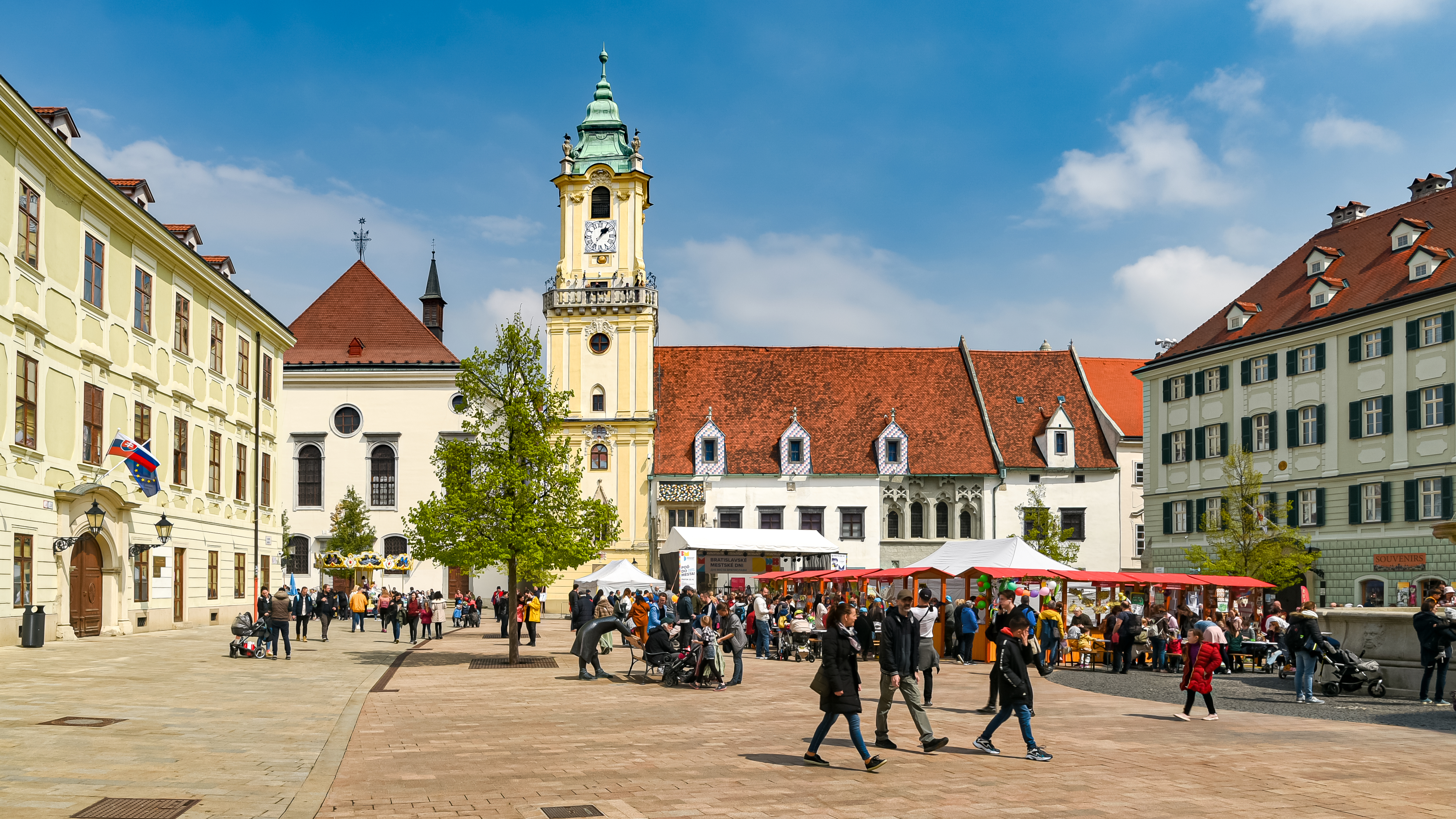
Main Square and Old Town Hall of Bratislava

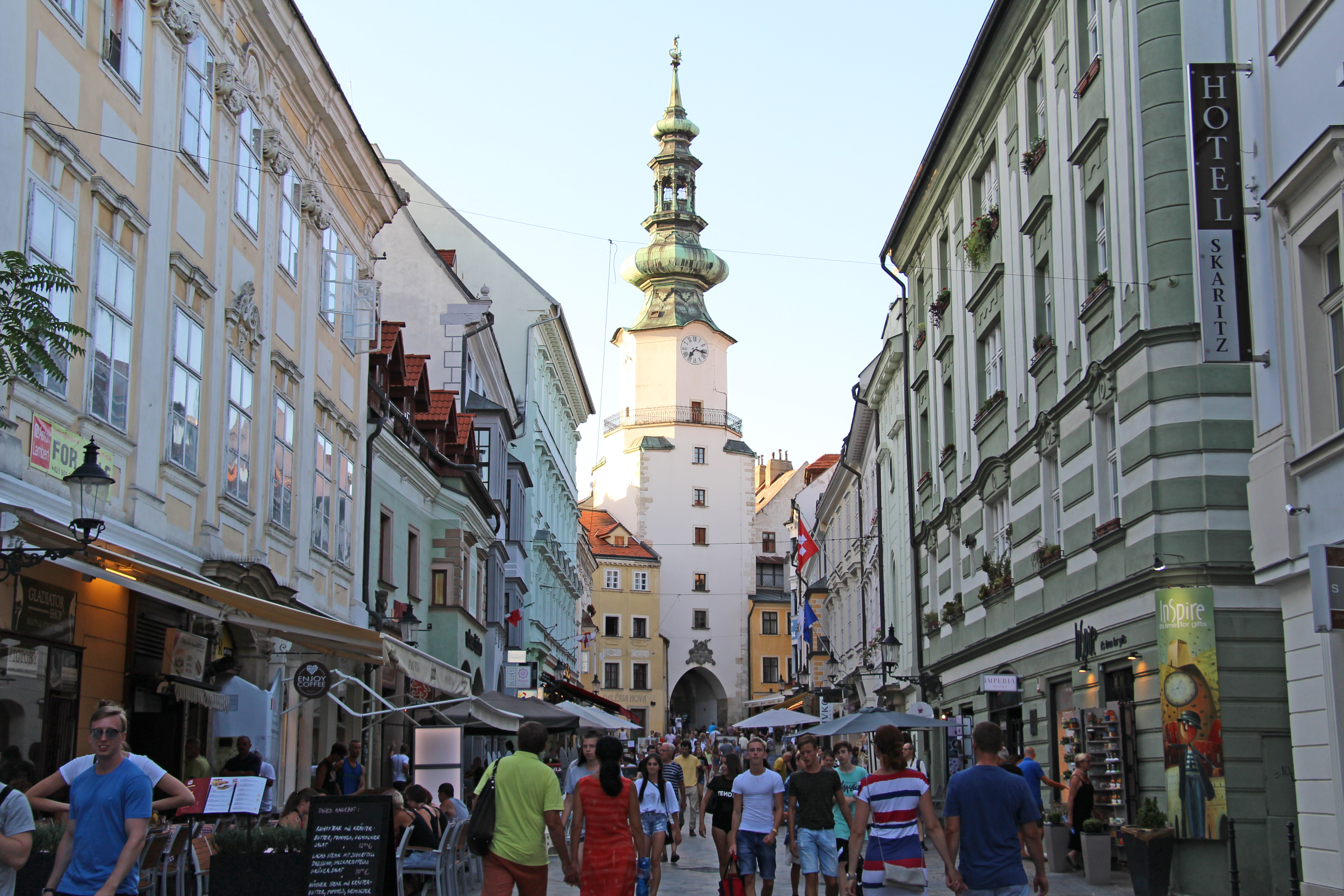
Michael's Gate, Bratislava

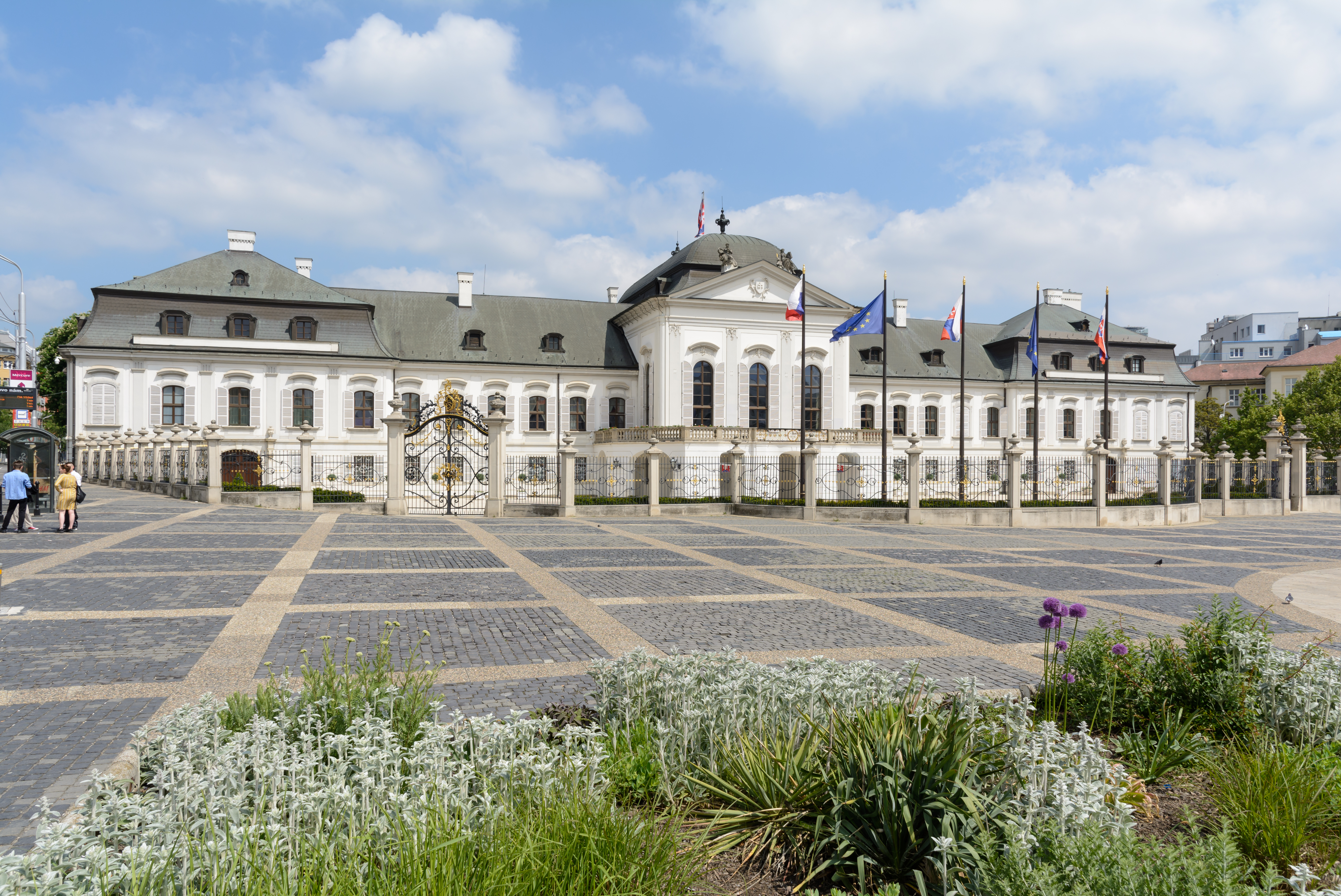
Grassalkovich (Presidential) Palace, Bratislava

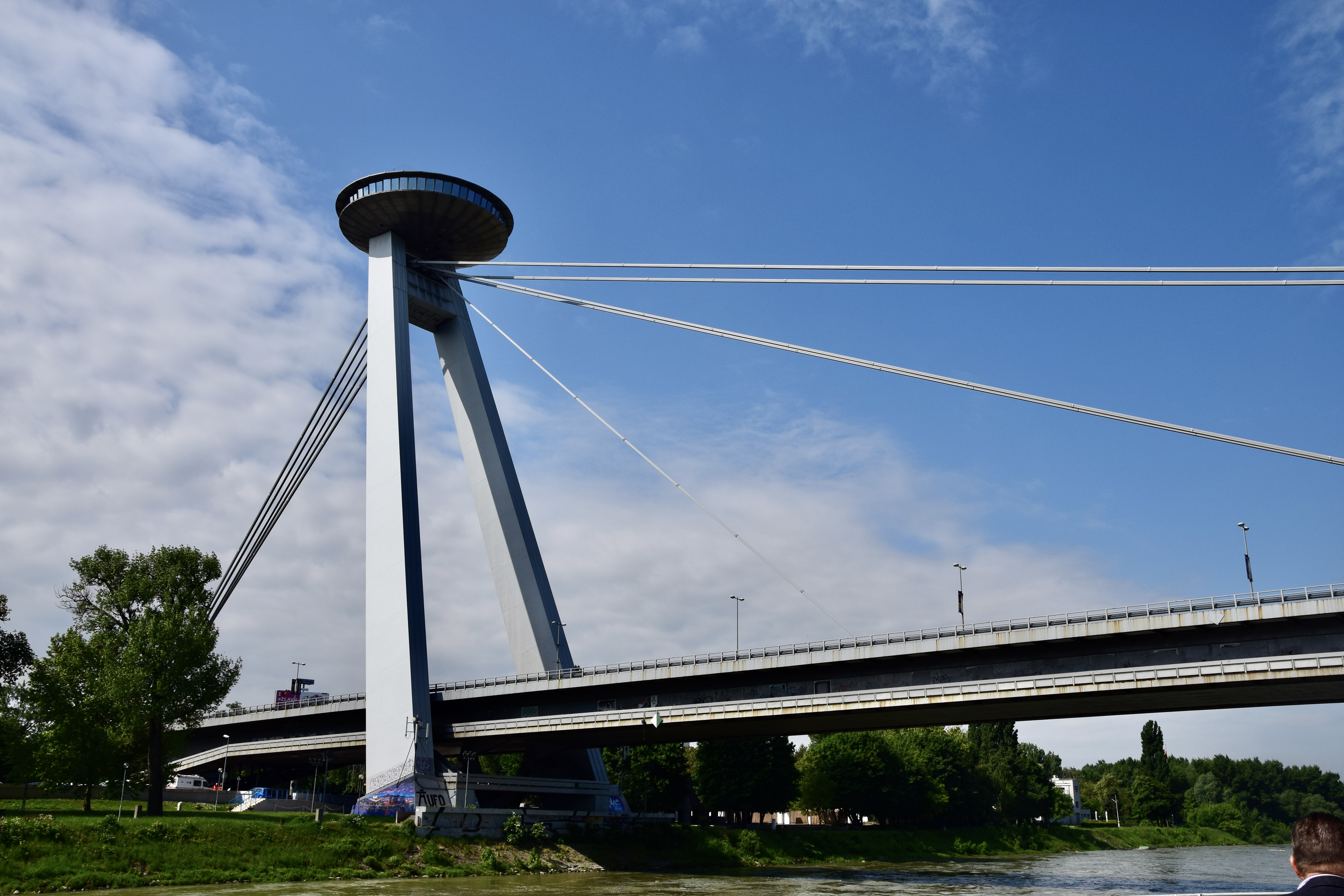
Bridge of the Slovak National Uprising, Bratislava

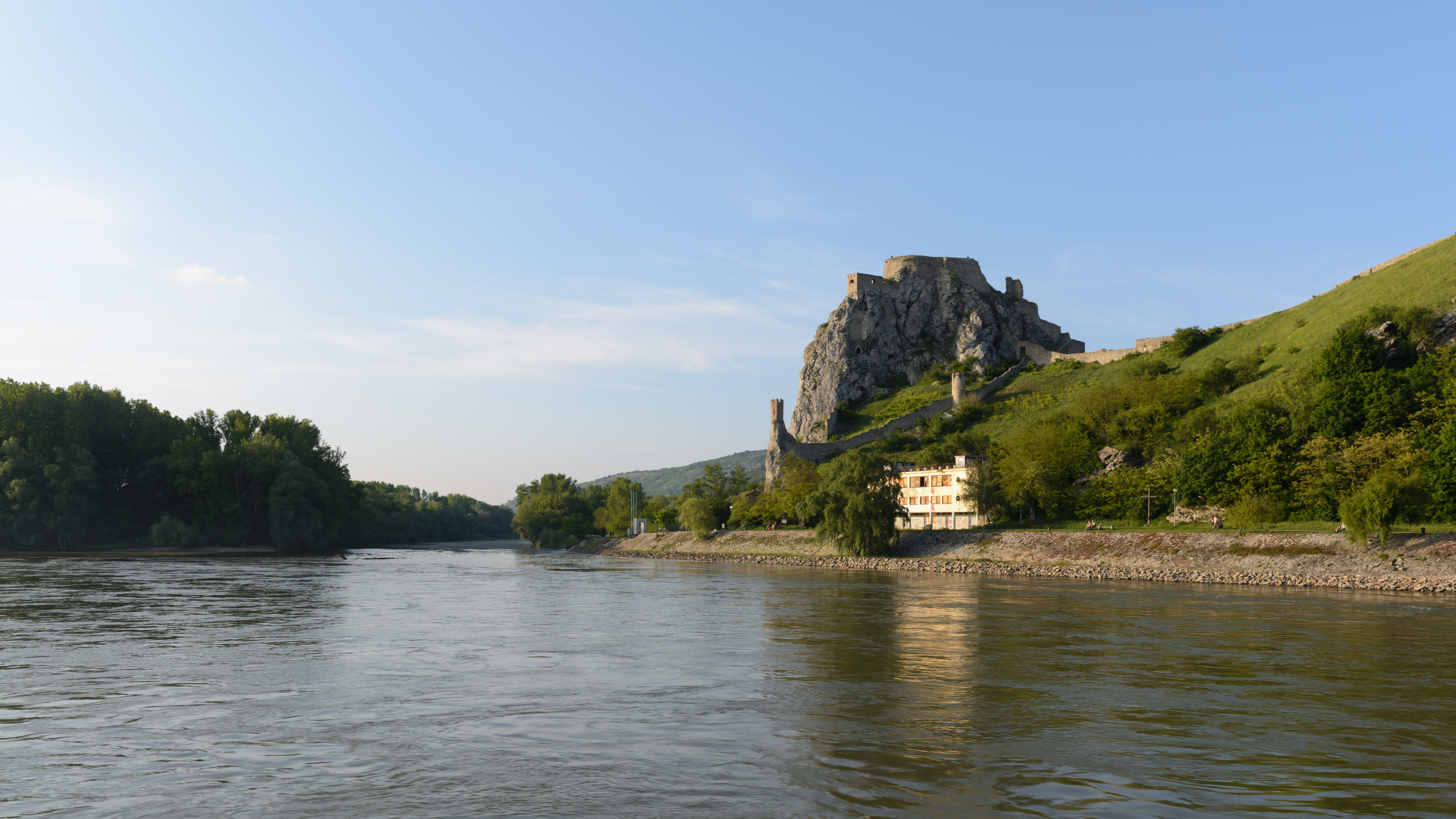
Devín Castle

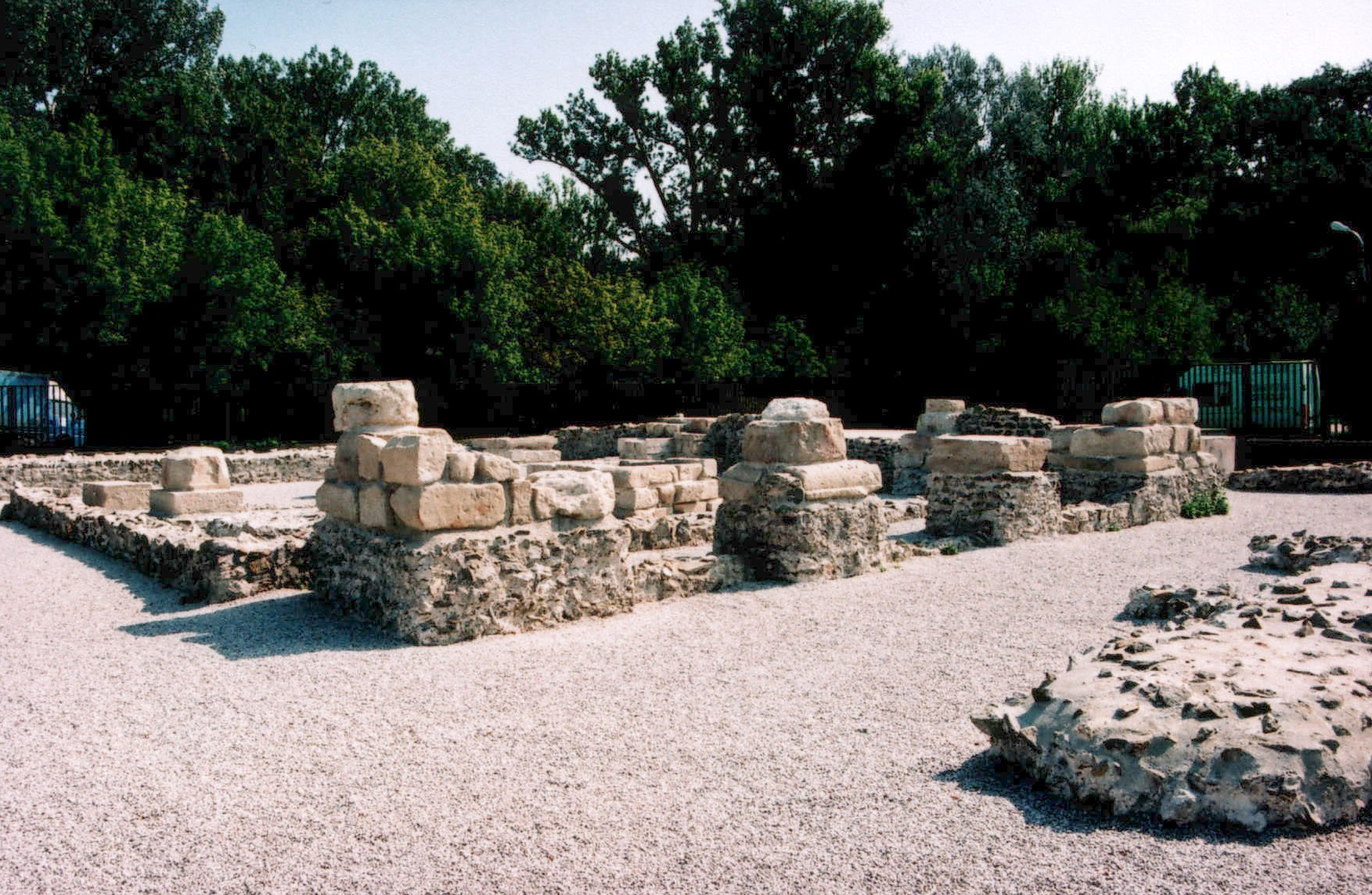
Roman military camp Gerulata (UNESCO World Heritage Site), Bratislava-Rusovce

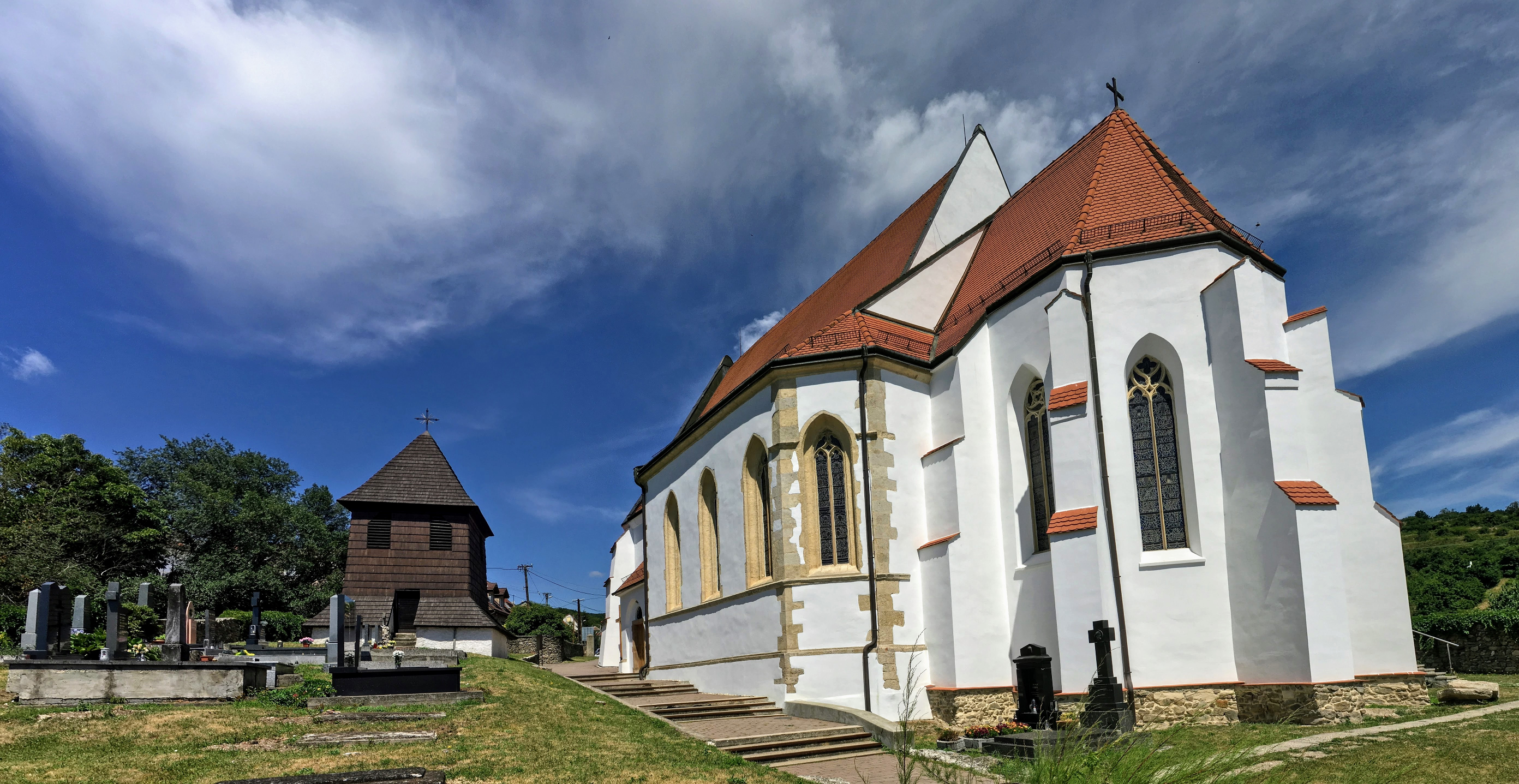
Svätý Jur

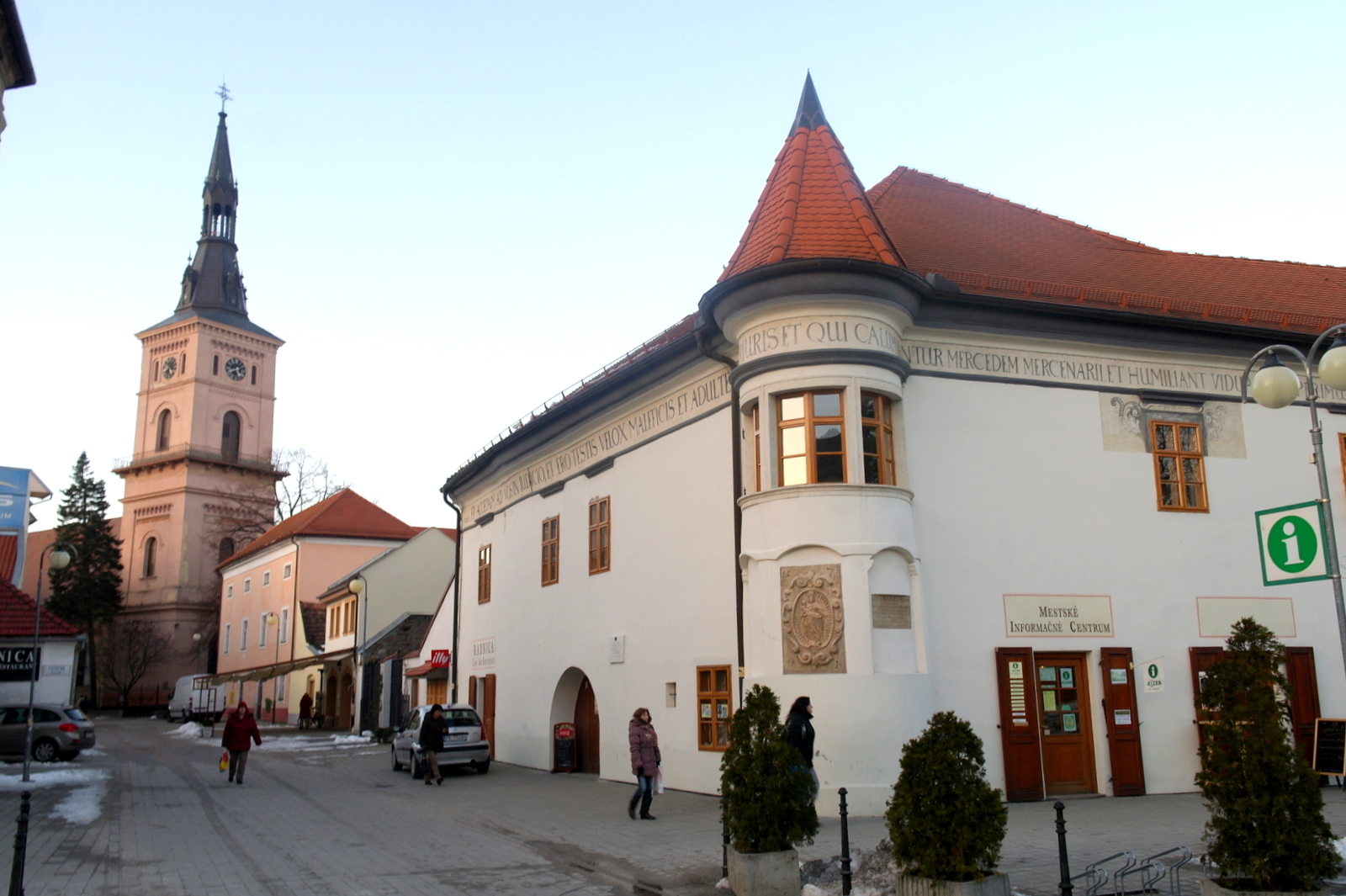
Pezinok

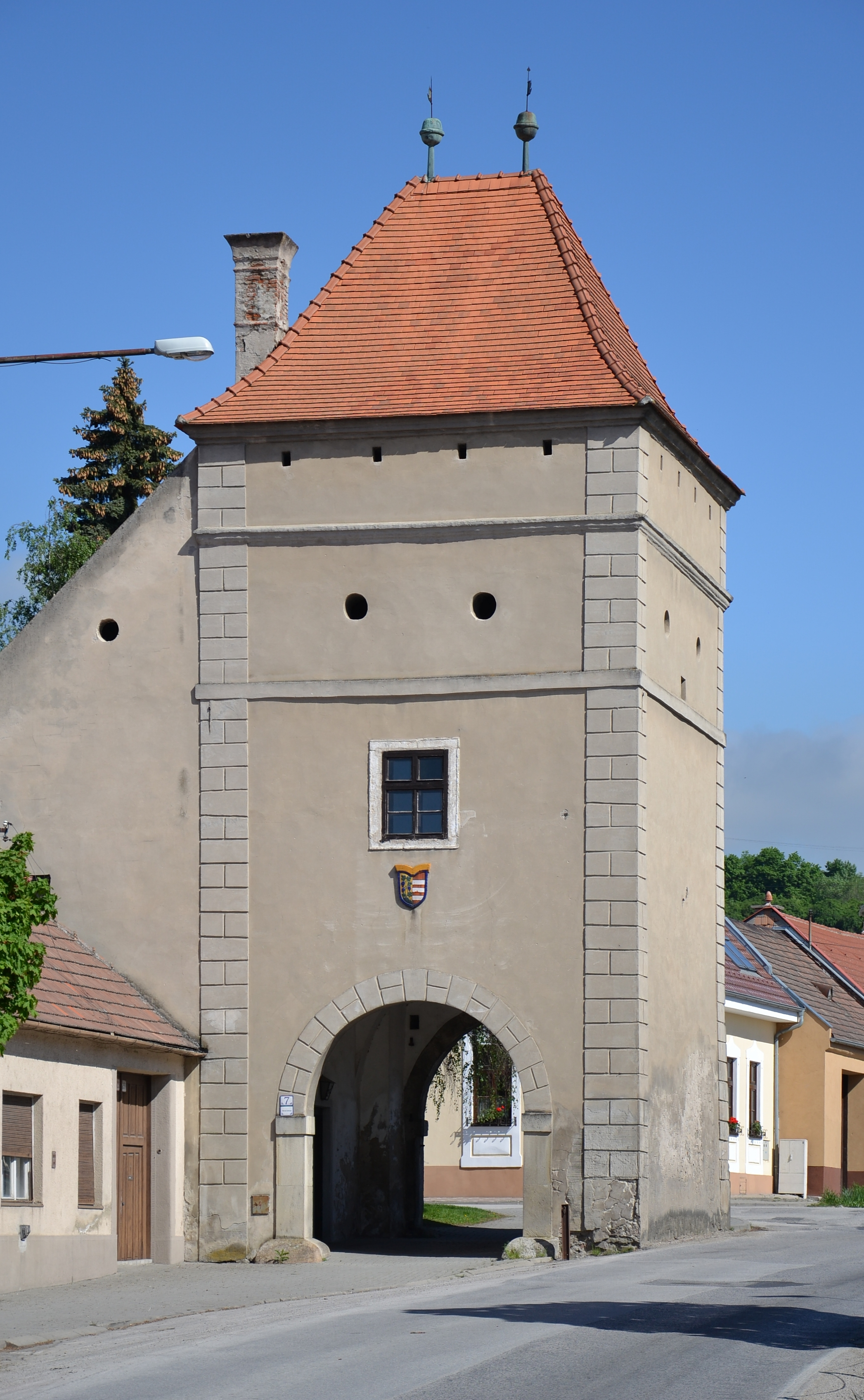
Modra

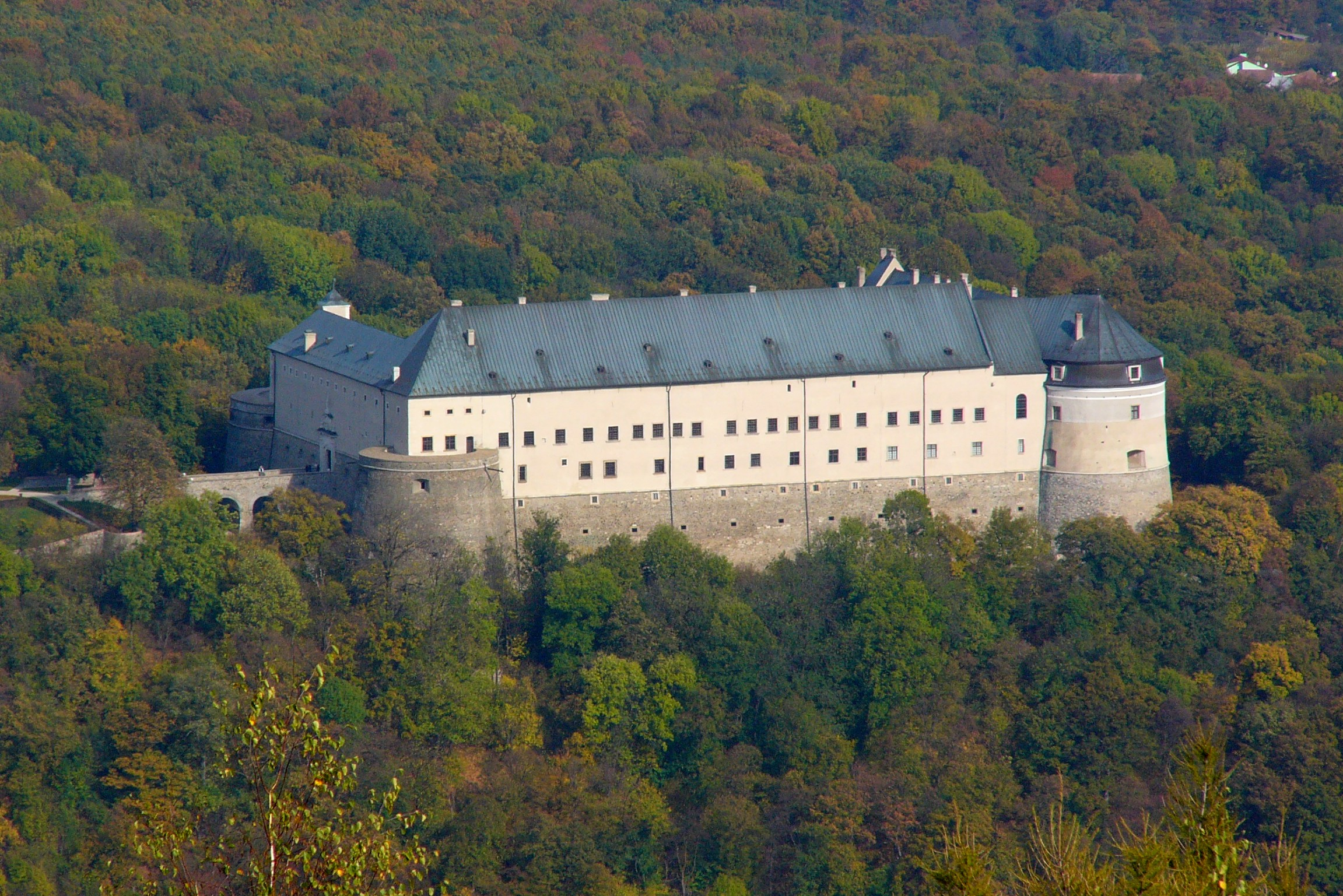
Červený Kameň Castle

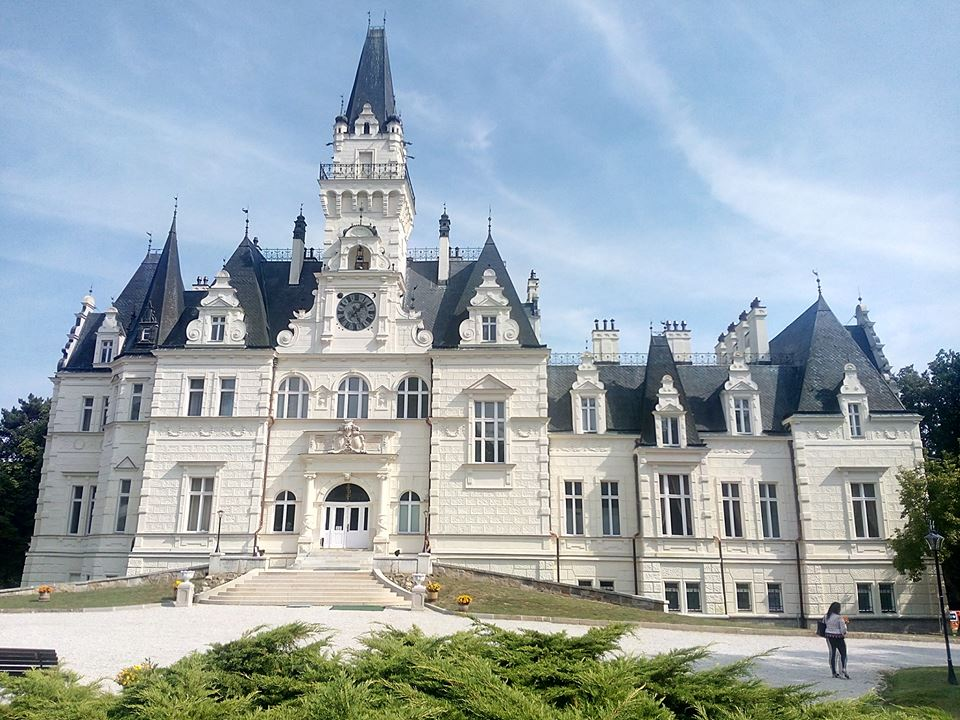
Budmerice Chateau

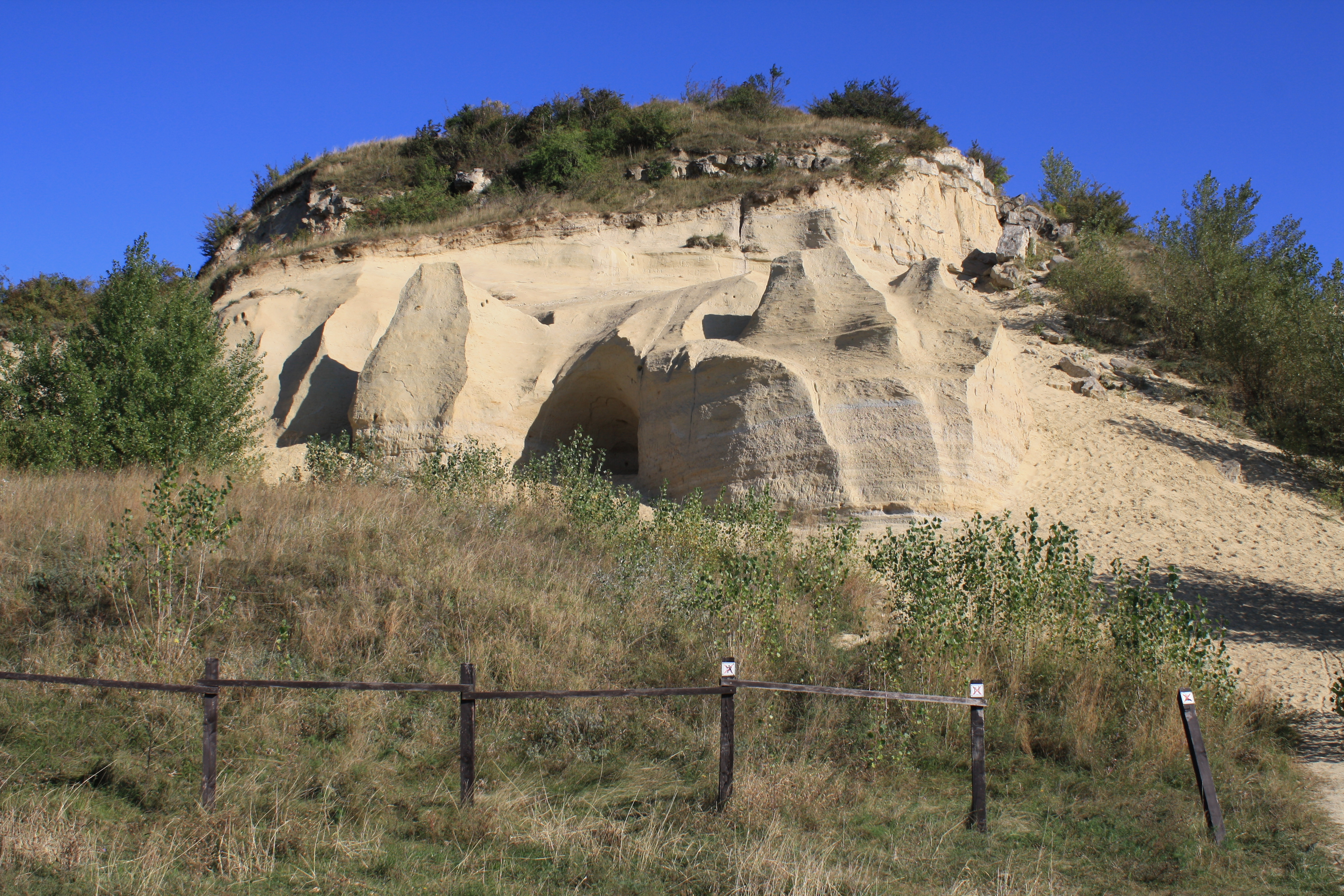
Sandberg, paleontological site

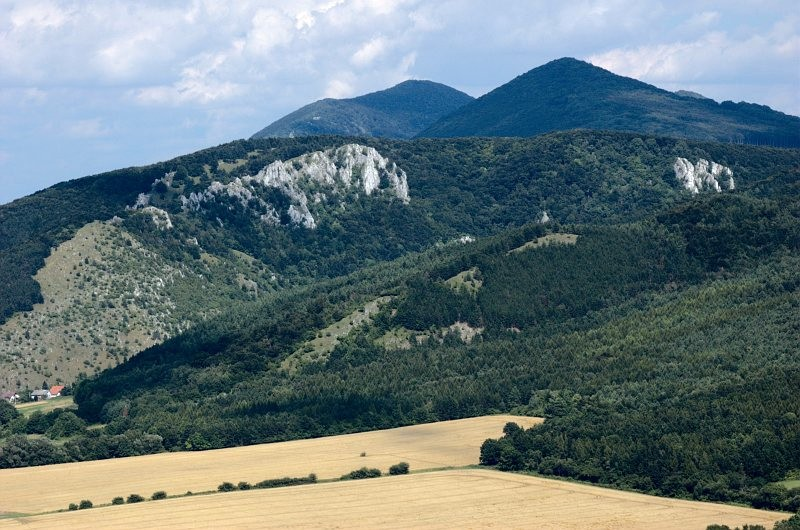
Little Carpathians Protected Landscape Area

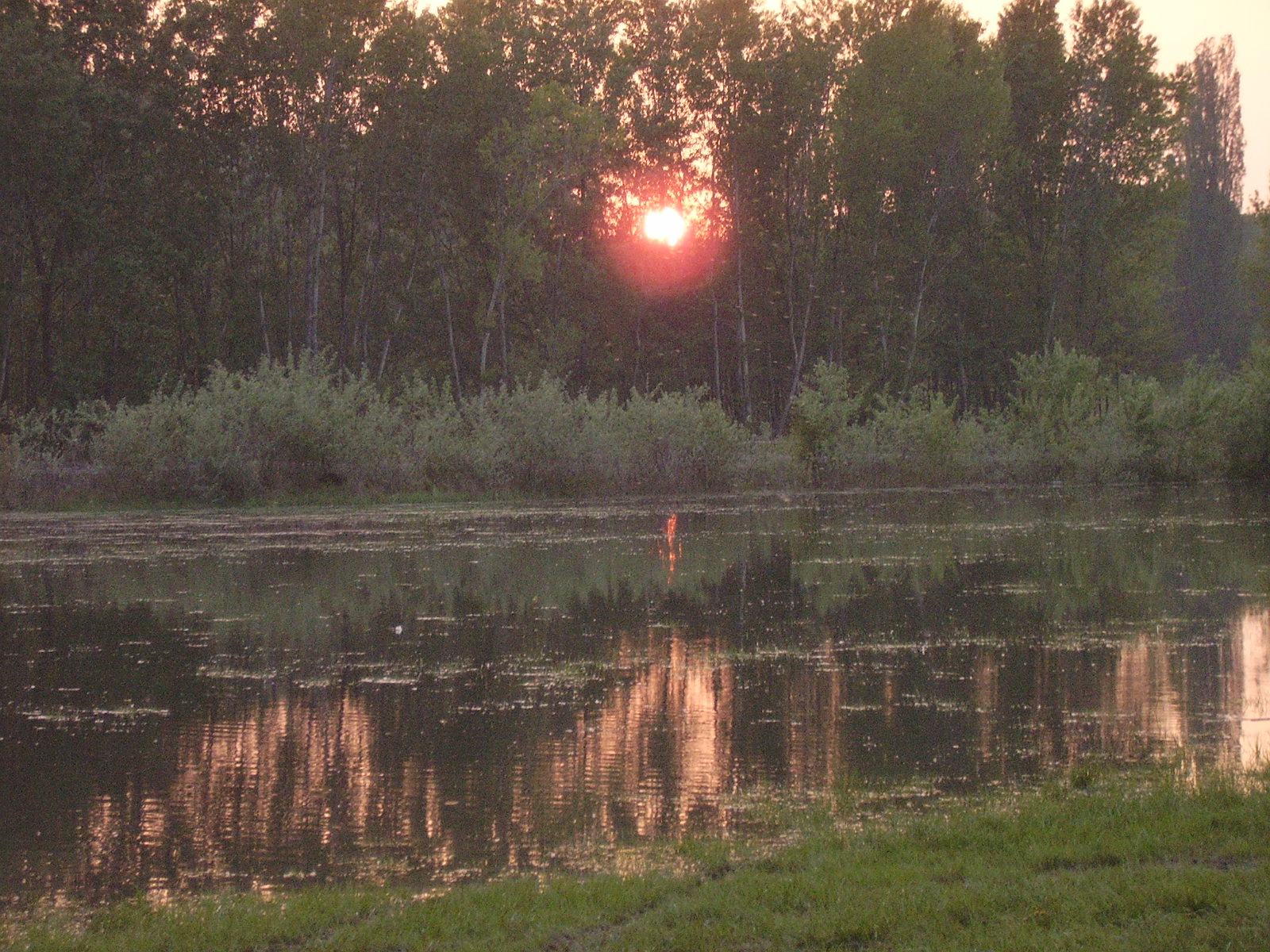
Dunajské Luhy Protected Landscape Area

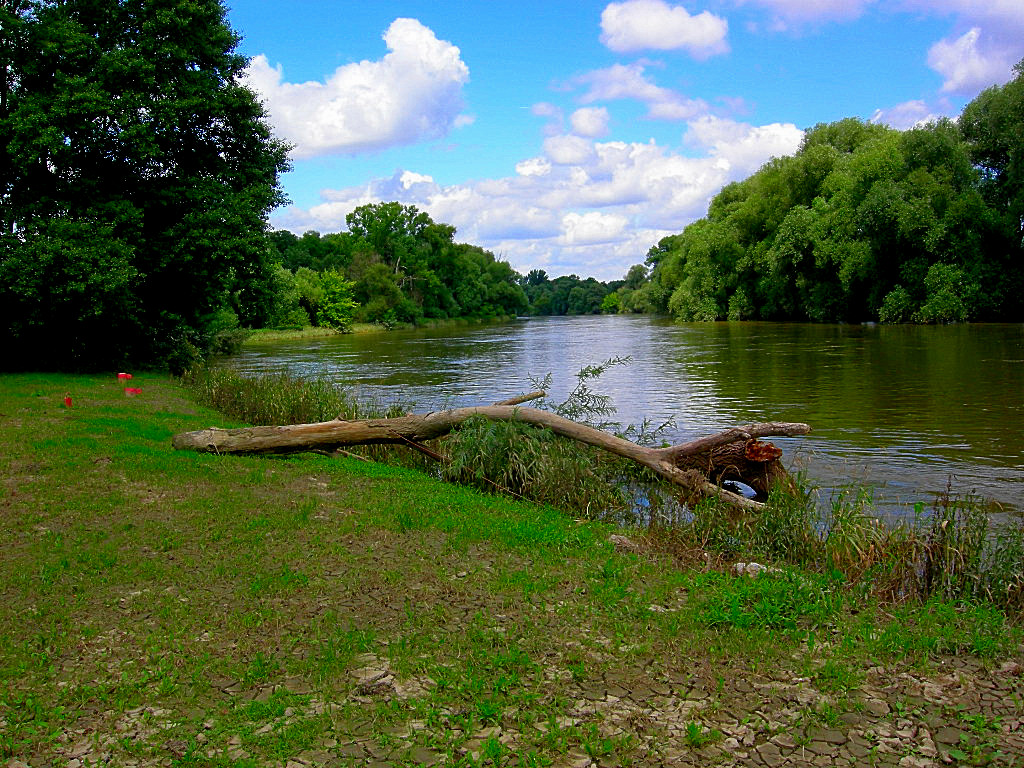
Záhorie Protected Landscape Area - Morava river
