= Kraj =

First-level administrative division in various countries

A Kraj (plural: kraje) is the highest-level administrative unit in the Czech Republic and the Slovak Republic. For lack of other English expressions, the Slavic term is often translated as "province", "region", or "territory", although it approximately means "(part of) country", or "(part of) countryside". A kraj is subdivided into okresy ("districts").

The first kraje were created in the Kingdom of Bohemia during the reign of Charles IV in the 14th century and they lasted till 1862/68. Kraje were reintroduced in 1949 in Czechoslovakia and still exist today (except for the early 1990s) in its successor states despite many rearrangements.

In Russia nine of the 85 federal subjects are called krais (Russian: края, kraya), coequal to oblasts. The toponym Krajina refers to several historical regions in Slavic countries.

== Toponymy ==
Kraj is also found as a toponym outside of Czech- and Slovak-speaking areas.

- Almaški Kraj, a part of Novi Sad, Serbia
- Gerovski Kraj, a village near Čabar, Primorje-Gorski Kotar County, Croatia
- Jovanovski Kraj, a former name of Rotkvarija/Žitni Trg, a part of Novi Sad, Serbia
- Končarev Kraj, a village near Plitvička Jezera, Lika-Senj County, Croatia
- Kraj, Pašman, a village in Zadar County, Croatia
- Kraj, Split-Dalmatia County, a village in Dicmo, Croatia
- Kraj, Primorje-Gorski Kotar County, a village near Mošćenička Draga, Croatia
- Kraj Donji, a village near Marija Gorica, Croatia
- Kraj Drage, a village near Sveta Nedelja, Istria County, Croatia
- Kraj Gornji, a village near Marija Gorica, Croatia
- Rašića Kraj, a hamlet near Vranići, Serbia
- Srednji Kraj, a village near Barajevo, Serbia

== Anthroponymy ==
Kraj is also found as a surname. Notable people with the name include:

- Rudolf Kraj (born 1977), a Czech boxer

== Other uses ==
- Kraj (song), 2009 single by the Macedonian singer Karolina Gočeva

== See also ==
- Bohemia § Historical administrative divisions
- Federal subjects of Russia
- Krajina
- Semasiological map for *krajь
