= Slovak heraldry =

Slovak heraldry is the study and practice of heraldry in the territory of Slovakia.

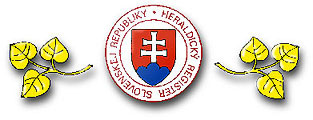
The Heraldic register of the Slovak Republic

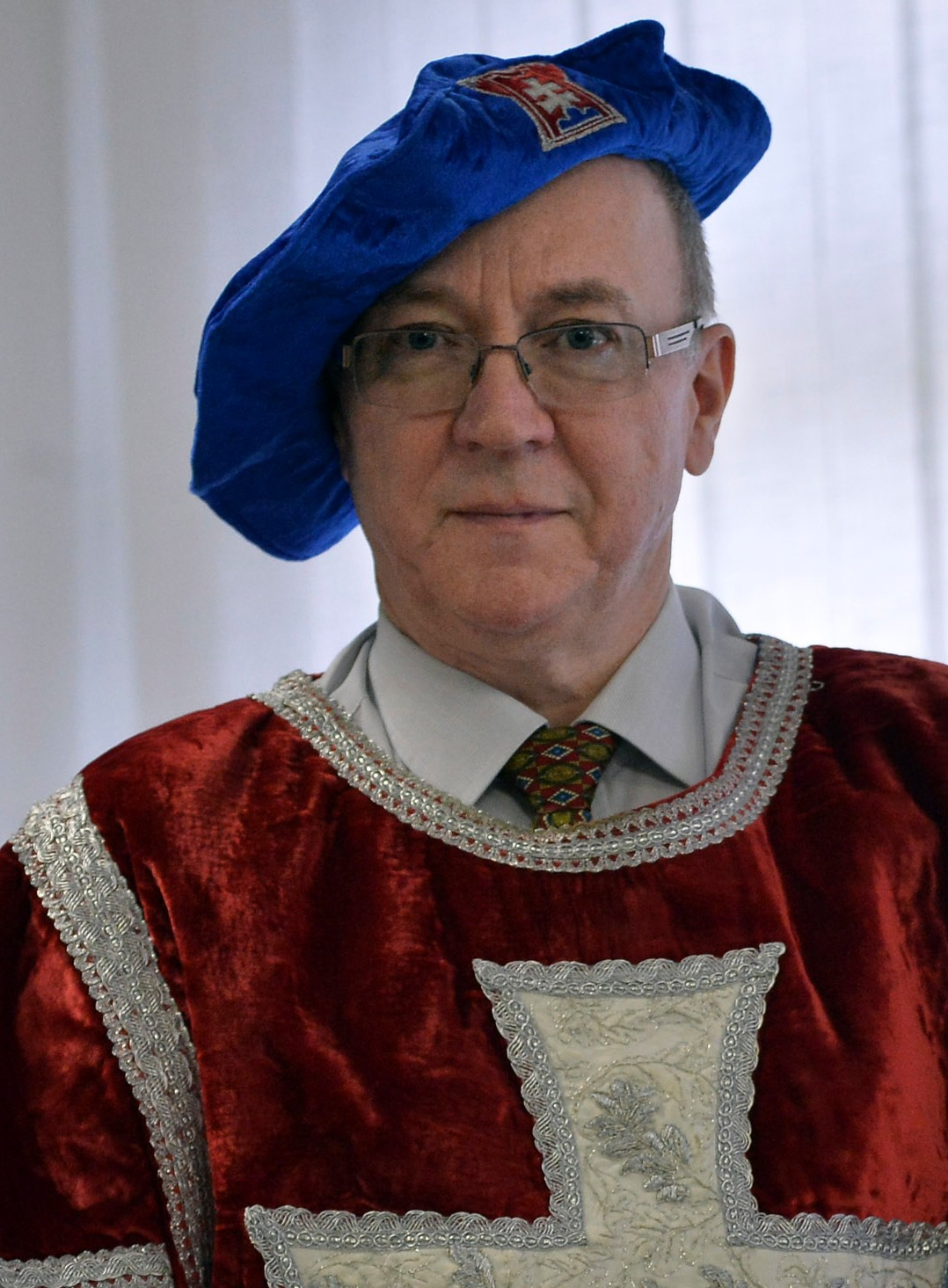
Ladislav Vrtel, chief state counsel for heraldry

In 1975 a heraldic commission of the Ministry of Interior was created in order to give recommendations to municipal councils on the use of coats of arms.

Heraldický register Slovenskej republiky (The Heraldic register of the Slovak Republic) is the national heraldic authority of Slovakia constituted within the Slovak Ministry of Interior. It functions as the country's official record for coats of arms and flags.

== Regional heraldry ==
Article 1 of the Law on Self Government of Regions says:

The self-governing region has its symbols, which can be used in execution of self-government. Symbols of self-governing region are its coat of arms, flag and seal, in some case a melody.

Bratislava Region

Trnava Region

Trenčín Region

Nitra Region

Žilina Region

Banská Bystrica Region

Prešov Region

Košice Region

== Municipal heraldry ==
Article 1b of the Law on Municipal Arrangement says:

The municipality has right to its own symbols. A municipality which has own symbols is obliged to use it in exercise of self-government. Municipalities' symbols are a municipal coat of arms, a municipal flag, a municipal seal, and in some cases a melody of the municipality.

In practice every municipality has its own coat of arms, as it is needed for everyday conduct of administration.

=== Common themes ===
Agricultural, viticultural and mining motifs are most common in Slovak municipal heraldry.

==== Viticultural ====
In the 13th century, German settlers commenced the cultivation of wine in the Little Carpathians region of western Slovakia.

When some of settlements gained city rights, their older charges were combined with royal/state charges. In that way, emperor Ferdinand I granted a coat of arms to Častá in 1560 and emperor Rudolf II amended older viticultural charge of Modra with royal stripes in 1607.

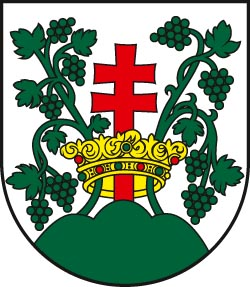
Častá

Modra

As viticulture became widespread, new wine growing areas arose. Today there are six recognized wine growing regions. That is why viticultural symbols are quite common in modern Slovak municipal heraldry.

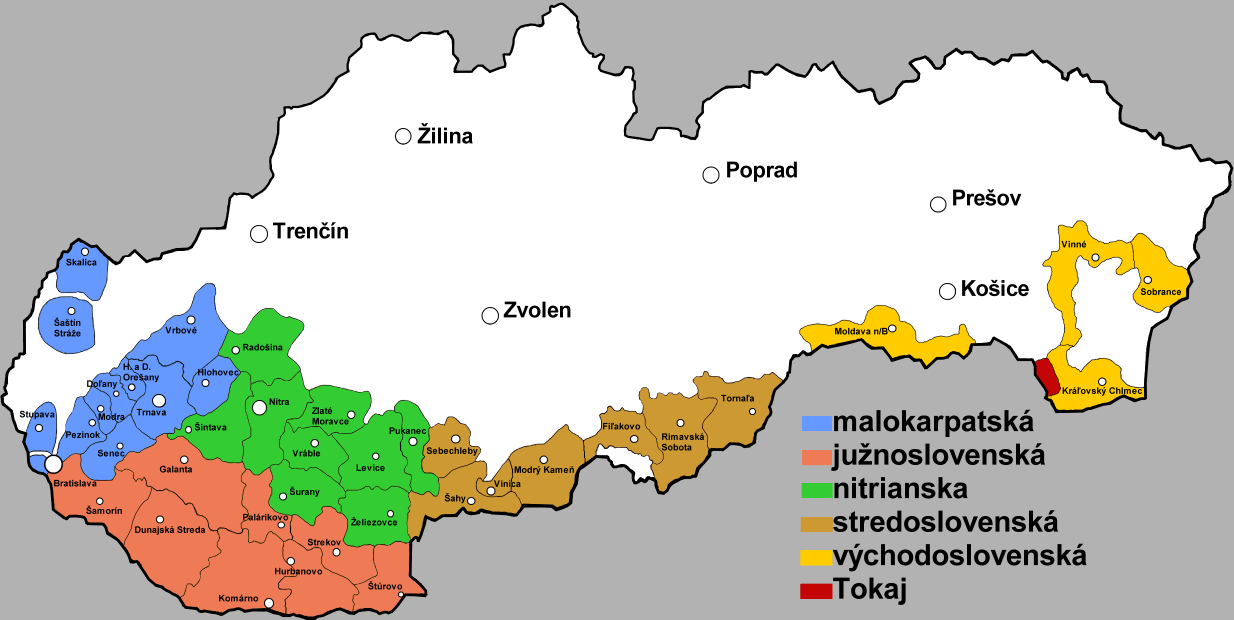
Wine-producing regions in Slovakia.

Viticultural symbols used: a bunch of grapes, grapevine, even vinedresser. As of instruments depicted, a type of billhook, so called viticultural knife is widely used.

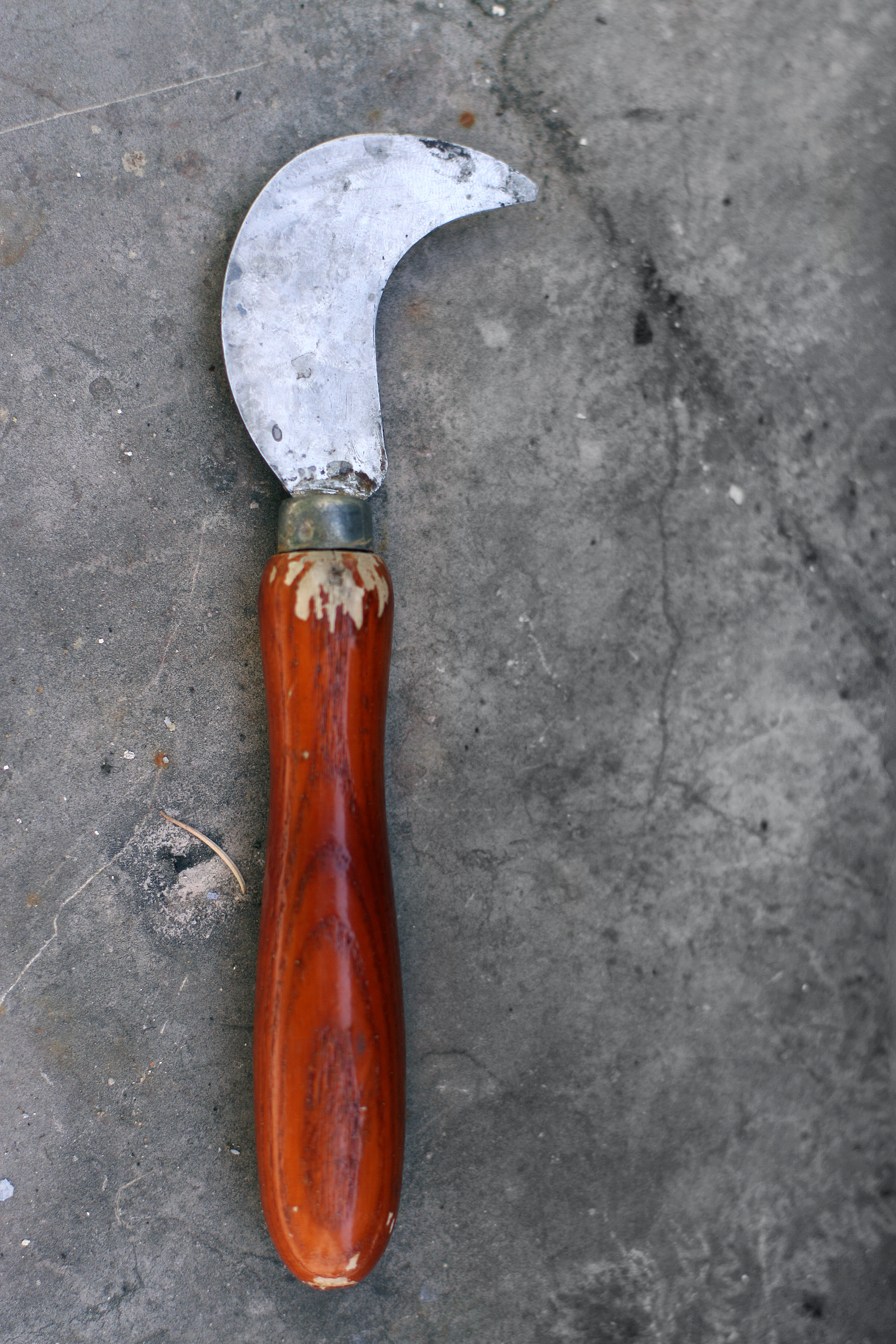
viticultural knife (gousotte/Rebmesser)

Kaplna

Vajnory
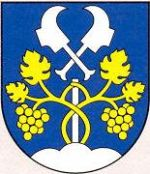
Vinosady

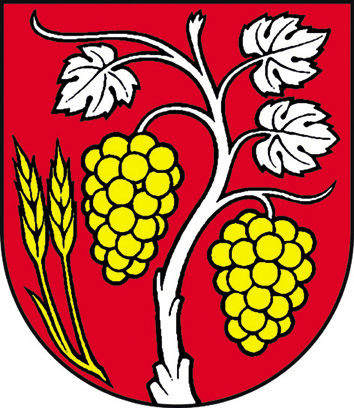
Komjatice
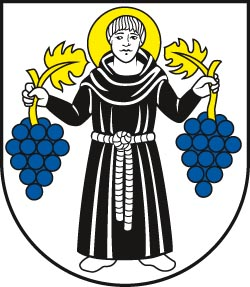
Doľany

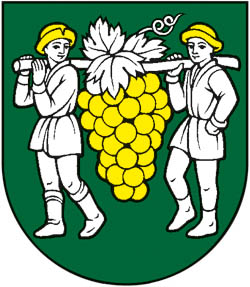
Krškany

==== Mining ====
St. Katherine's cult became significant in several German inhabited mining towns in the northern part of the ancient Kingdom of Hungary, today's Slovakia, and her popularity there suggests that she was venerated as a miners' saint. As a consequence, her attribute - a breaking wheel - is considered a mining symbol in modern Slovak municipal heraldry. It is common in those municipalities with history of German settlement and mining, like Handlová and Kremnica.

Handlová

Kremnica

The notable mining town of Banská Štiavnica preserved the oldest known town-seal from the ancient Kingdom of Hungary in a document issued in 1275., boasted to be oldest mining sign in Europe altogether. Despite existing St. Katherine's cult in town, its armory is explicit with pickaxe, hoe and hammer.

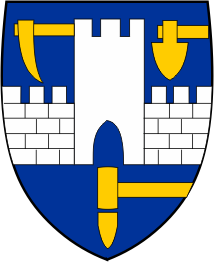
Banská Štiavnica

However, most common sign of ancient mining communities is a charge with a hammer and pick symbol:

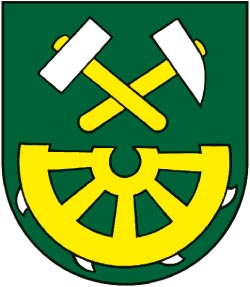
Kremnické Bane

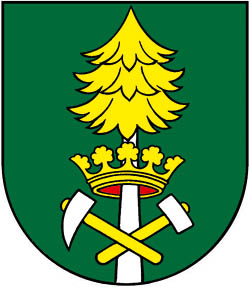
Kunešov

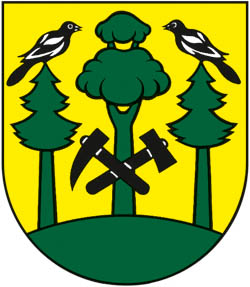
Turček
Nová Baňa

Rožňava

Dobšiná

A distinctive charge in several urban shields is a two-barred cross.

Žilina

Zvolen

Topoľčany

== Ecclesiastic heraldry in Slovakia ==
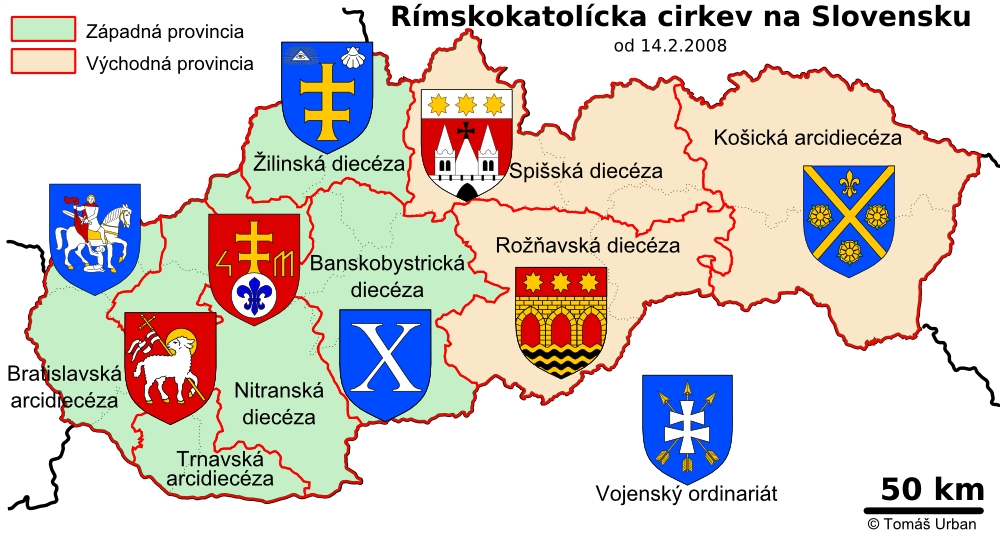
Latin rite dioceses in Slovakia

After the Velvet Revolution, church heraldry in Slovakia has been more publicly used; the Roman Catholic church, the Greek Catholic Church and some Protestant denominations has reinvented their own symbols.

Historically, Catholicism is the major Christian tradition in the country. As is common practice worldwide, Catholic bishops are represented in an episcopal conference. In order to provide correct use of ecclesiastic coats of arms, the Episcopal Conference of Slovakia in 2008 adopted canonic regulations and established its own heraldic consultant.

=== Armory of notable prelates ===
Jozef Tomko

Ján Chryzostom Korec
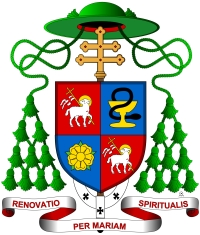
Ján Sokol

Róbert Bezák

== Heraldic societies ==
In support of all those interested in genealogy, heraldry and other related disciplines, there is a Slovak genealogical-heraldic society.
