= Fándlyho apple tree =

Individual apple tree in Nahac, Slovakia

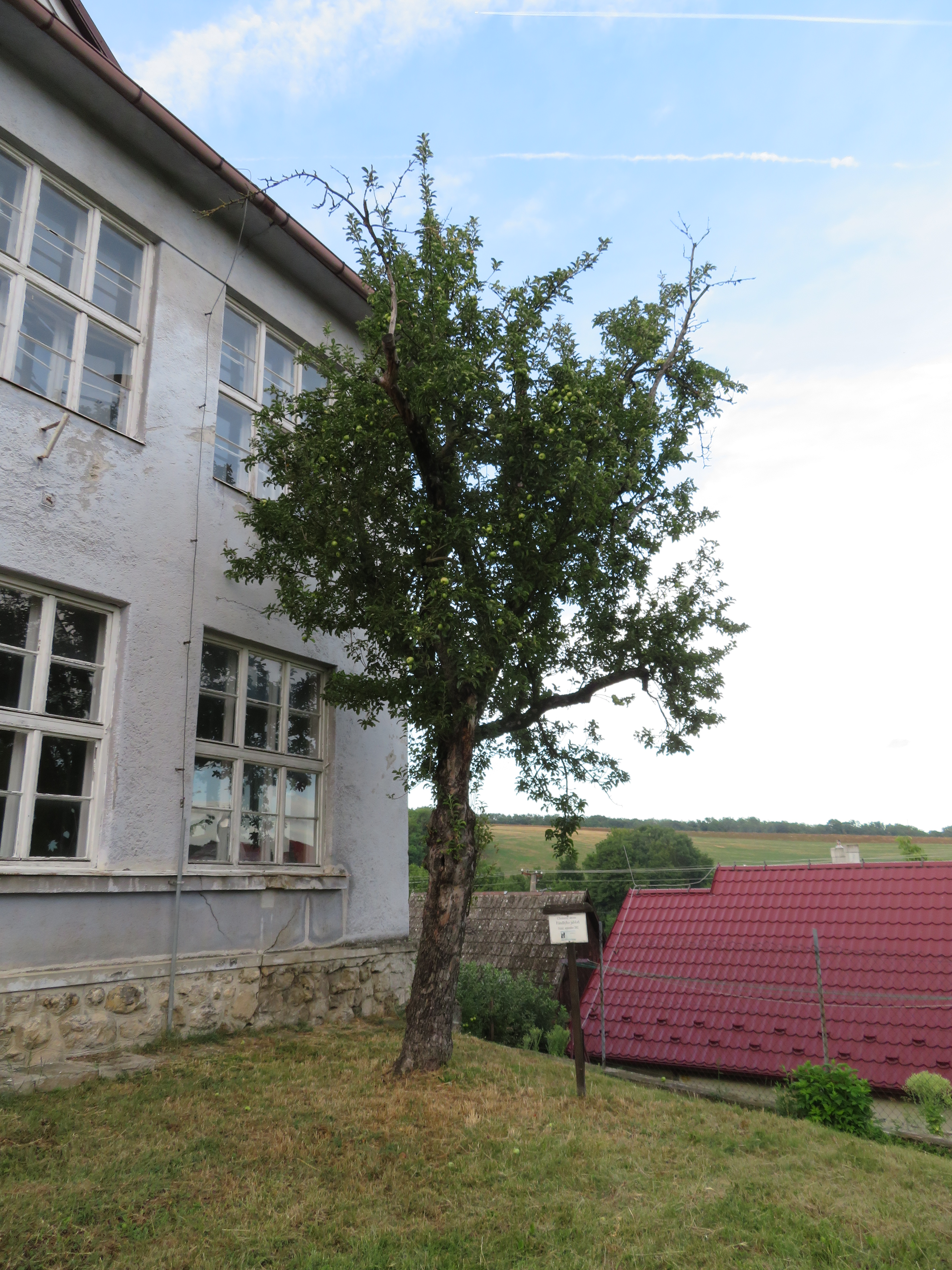
- The tree in 2023
- Interactive map of Fándlyho apple tree
- Species: Apple (Malus domestica)
- Location: Naháč, Trnava Region, Slovakia
- Coordinates: 48.536424°N 17.533275°E
- Height: 10 m
- Diameter: 110 cm (43 in)

Fándly's apple tree (Slovak: Fándlyho jabloň) is a domestic apple tree located in the village of Naháč. It is protected according to the Generally Binding Decree of the Trnava Regional Administrative Court 2002 for its uniqueness and genetic values. The apple tree is associated with the work of Juraj Fándly, a Slovak writer, Catholic priest and entomologist, who lived in the village for 26 years.

The tree is a part of Fanley’s Garden, a group of fruit trees protected by the Fándly Garden Civic Association, that was established in 2023.

A similar tree was described in 1922 in Bohemia, and rare trees have also been found in Germany, France, Great Britain and the USA.

== Discovery ==
Around the 1940s, a local teacher, Alojz Kaššák, found the apple tree by a stream in Naháč near Trnava that had inconspicuous flowers without corolla petals. He had rediscovered the tree that had been described in 1792 by Juraj Fándly. Kaššák grafted the apple tree and spread it among his students and in local gardens.

== Description ==
The properties of the tree are not transmitted to offspring by seeds, but only by vegetative methods of reproduction. The apple tree was preserved in the village until the middle of the last century, which was propagated by grafting and planted in the garden of the elementary school in Naháč. In the yard and garden of the former rectory, which is now a museum and memorial room of Juraj Fándly, three more eleven-year-old apple trees grow. The tree, which is 10 m high, is 45 years old.

Fándly's apple tree was also studied by experts from the Slovak Academy of Sciences. They concluded that it has a genetic abnormality, which means it does not even have any seeds. It can only be propagated by grafting. The tree is a rarity, which is why it is protected.

== Data ==
Name	Scientific name	Circumference	Height	Age	Crown diameter
Apple	Malus domestica	110 cm	10 m	45+	9 m

== See also ==
- List of individual trees
