= Bahon =

Bahon may refer to:

- Bahon, Haiti, an inland commune in Nord department, Haiti.
- Báhoň, a village and municipality in the Pezinok District of western Slovakia
