= Vištuk =

Vištuk Wischteich
- Municipality
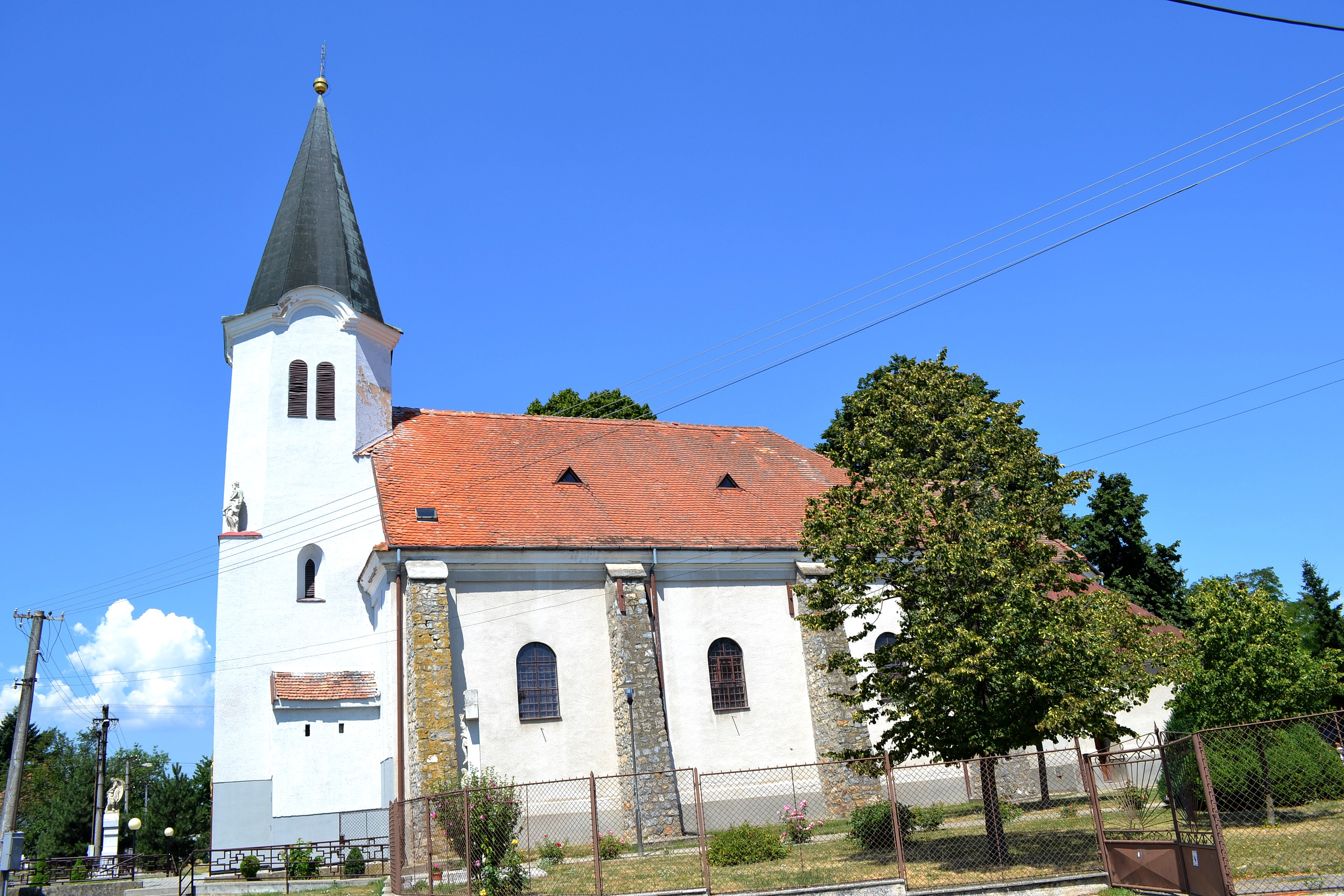
- Church of the Holy Trinity

- Flag

- Location of Vištuk in the Bratislava Region Location of Vištuk in Slovakia
- Coordinates: 48.33°N 17.40°E
- Country: Slovakia
- Region: Bratislava Region
- District: Pezinok District
- First mentioned: 1244

Area
  - Total: 20.03 km^{2} (7.73 sq mi)
- Elevation: 172 m (564 ft)

Population (2025)
  - Total: 1,353
- Time zone: UTC+1 (CET)
  - Summer (DST): UTC+2 (CEST)
- Postal code: 900 85
- Area code: +421 33
- Vehicle registration plate (until 2022): PK
- Website: www.vistuk.sk

Vištuk (German: Wischteich, Hungarian: Kárpáthalas) is a village and municipality in western Slovakia in Pezinok District in the Bratislava region. The town is located north of Senec and east of Modra.

== Geography ==
The municipality lies at an altitude of 172 metres (564 ft) and covers an area of 20.03 km^{2} (7.73 sq mi) (2025).

== History ==
Archeologists found remains of settlements from roughly 5000 BC. The modern history of the village begins in 1244, when it is first mentioned under the name Vyscha. At that time the village was very new. The entire region was decimated during the 1241-42 Mongol invasion, and subsequently resettled by German winemakers.

After another decline in the first half of the 16th century, the town experienced significant growth, largely due to an influx of Croatian settlers in 1540. Vištuk is situated at the merger of three creeks and once had several water reservoirs, the largest of which still exists today. By the end of the 16th Century, the village was one of the largest in the Červený Kameň county. In 1573 the town built its Roman Catholic church of Holy Trinity, in the place of an older, Gothic church. Roughly at the same time, a smaller church was built, later rebuilt into a chapel.

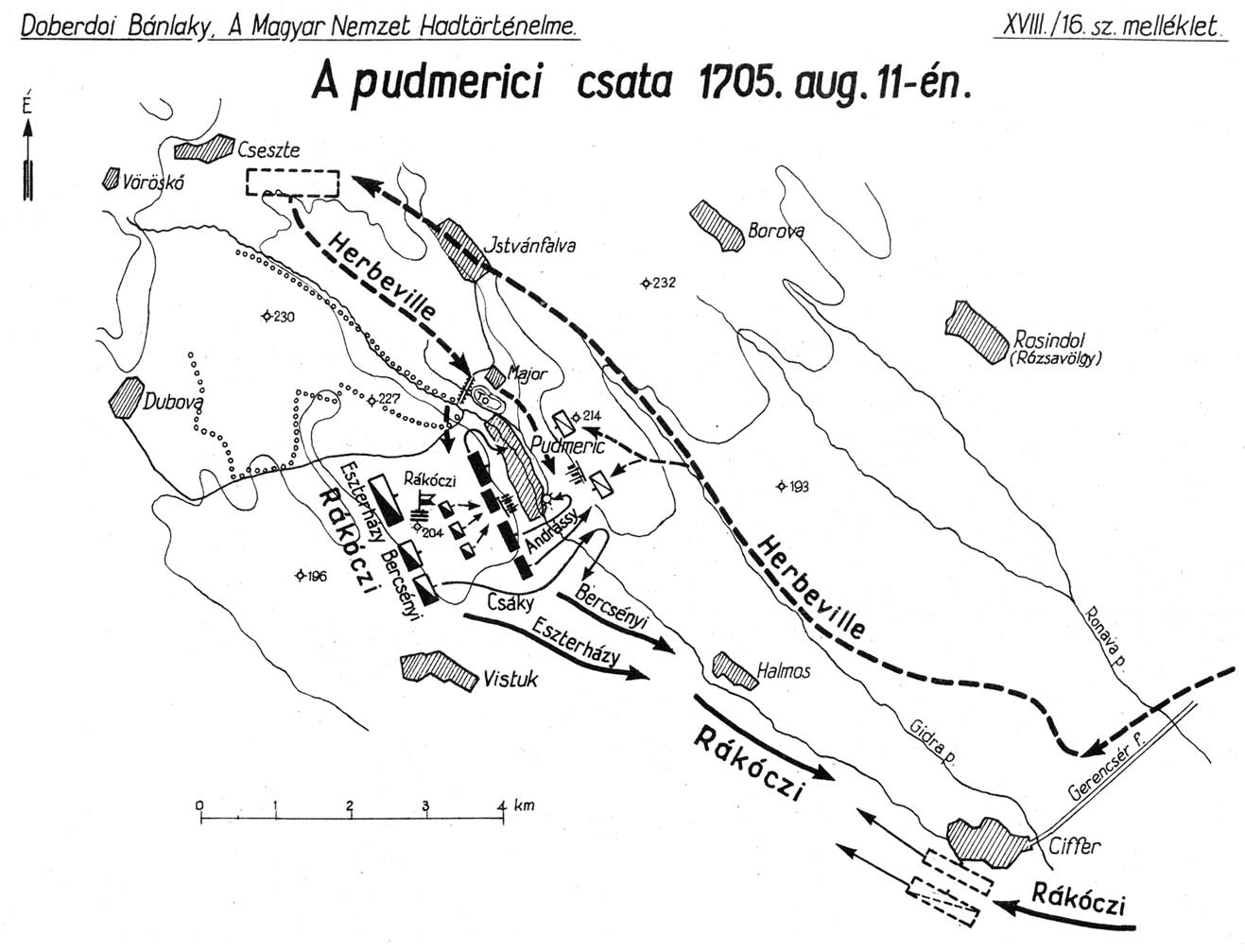
Map of the Battle of Budmerice, with Vistuk marked

In 1705 the village was burned to the ground during the Battle of Budmerice, during the 1703-11 Hungarian independence war led by Francis II Rákóczi. The town was rebuilt, only to be burned down three more times in the 18th century. During that time, Anton Benčič, a Catholic priest, translator and one of the first proponents of the Slovak language, was born in Vištuk in 1745.

In the 19th and 20th century the village grew somewhat, mainly thanks to its vineyards. In 1920, the current name, Vištuk, was codified.

== Infrastructure and Industry ==
Vištuk has centralized water and gas distribution, but not a sewage system. The village lies outside of main roads, and is thus only serviced by local intercity buses. It does not have direct access to a railway.

There is a school and a medical doctor in the village, the latter being present twice per week for adults and once per week for children.

The village has shifted its focus from small businesses to tourism. It sits on the so-called "Low Carpathian Mountains Wine Route", which connects all major wine producing towns in the area. The town's Muller Thurgau wines are considered to be of above average quality. The town's annual farmer's market ties into the wine making, and has been drawing many visitors to the village every year.

In addition, the village has created a natural area, including a unique nesting place for swallows. It consists of a sandstone wall with hundreds of holes that the swallows use for nesting in the spring.

== Culture and Entertainment ==
The village has its own folk band, Vištučanka, established in 1990. The band's managers have aggressively worked to develop the band up to par with much more established bands from neighboring villages. In addition, the town has a library and a movie theater, which has one to two showings every month.

The town's soccer club, established in 1931, is playing in Slovakia's lowest, sixth division soccer league. The football field is being occasionally used for other sporting events, such as a recent football tournament promoting ethnic tolerance.

== Population ==
Population statistic (10 years)
Year	1995	2005	2015	2025
Count	1286	1369	1318	1353
Difference		+6.45%	−3.72%	+2.65%

Population statistic
Year	2024	2025
Count	1365	1353
Difference		−0.87%

It has a population of 1353 people (31 December 2025).

=== Ethnicity ===
Census 2021 (1+ %)
Ethnicity	Number	Fraction
Slovak	1332	95.68%
Not found out	43	3.08%
Total	1392	

In year 2021 was 1392 people by ethnicity 1332 as Slovak, 43 as Not found out, 12 as Rusyn, 8 as Czech, 7 as Croatian, 6 as Romani, 6 as Hungarian, 3 as German, 2 as Jewish, 2 as Russian, 2 as Romanian, 2 as Polish, 2 as Other, 1 as Ukrainian and 1 as Italian.

Note on population: The difference values of population numbers in the table "Population statistic" and in the sections "Ethnicity" & "Religion" is caused by the use of various statistical methods.

=== Religion ===
Census 2021 (1+ %)
Religion	Number	Fraction
Roman Catholic Church	942	67.67%
None	325	23.35%
Not found out	50	3.59%
Evangelical Church	27	1.94%
Total	1392	

In year 2021 was 1392 people by religion 942 from Roman Catholic Church, 325 from None, 50 from Not found out, 27 from Evangelical Church, 9 from Eastern Orthodox Church, 9 from Greek Catholic Church, 7 from Other, 5 from Buddhism, 4 from Christian Congregations in Slovakia, 4 from Ad hoc movements, 3 from Old Catholic Church, 3 from Paganism and natural spirituality, 3 from Jehovah's Witnesses and 1 from Calvinist Church.

As of 2023, Vištuk had 1,382 inhabitants. In 2004, the composition was: 677 men and 705 women. 98.4% were of Slovak ethnicity. Of all inhabitants, 90% were Roman Catholic, 1.3% were Evangelical Catholic and 5.9% were atheist. Of the 434 houses in the village, 366 were permanently occupied.
