= Juraj Fándly =

Slovak writer, Catholic priest and entomologist (bee-keeper)

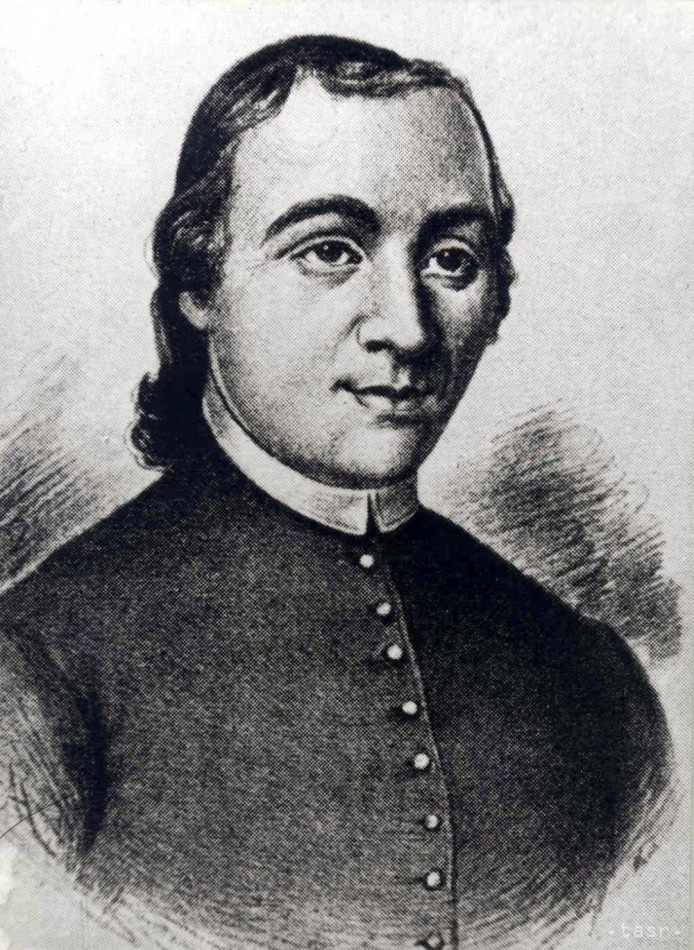
- Born: 21 October 1750; Častá, Kingdom of Hungary (now Častá, Pezinok District, Slovakia)
- Died: 7 March 1811 (aged 60); Ompitál, Kingdom of Hungary (now Doľany, Slovakia)
- Occupation: Writer

Juraj Fándly (Hungarian: György Fándly or György Fandl; 21 October 1750 – 7 March 1811) was a Slovak writer, Catholic priest and entomologist (bee-keeper) in the Kingdom of Hungary.

== Life ==
He was born in Častá (Cseszte), Kingdom of Hungary into a craftsman-farmer's family. His father died soon after his birth, and mother moved to the neighbouring village of Doľany (Ompitál), where he also visited elementary school. He later studied at a Piarist gymnasium in Svätý Jur (Szentgyörgy), later studied theology in Buda (today part of Budapest) and Trnava (Nagyszombat). Due to his weak health he wasn't accepted into any religious order. In 1776 he was ordained and started working as a chaplain in Sereď (Szered) (1776), for a short time in Lukáčovce (Lakács) (1780), finally working as a priest in Naháč (Nahács) from 1780 to 1807. In the meantime he also worked as a secretary in the Slovenské učené tovarišstvo (Slovak Educated Brotherhood) (1792). Later, he retired to his home back in Doľany, where he lived until his death in 1811, and composed poetry.

== Legacy ==
There is a garden in Naháč, named after Fándley. In the garden is the prominent Fándlyho apple tree. The properties of the tree are not transmitted to offspring by seeds, but only by vegetative methods of reproduction. The apple tree was also studied by experts from the Slovak Academy of Sciences. They concluded that it has a genetic abnormality, which means it does not even have any seeds. It can only be propagated by grafting. The tree is a rarity, which is why it is protected.

== Works ==
- Dúverná zmlúva medzi mňíchom a ďáblom (1789) [An intimate treaty between the monk and the Devil] - the first major work in the Bernolák's Slovak language standard
- Piľní domajší a poľní hospodár (1792–1800) [Laborious house and field farmer]
- Zelinkár (1793) [Herbalist]
- Príhodné a svátečné kázňe (1795–1796) [Occasional and feat sermons]
- Compendiata historia gentis Slavae (1793) [A concise history of the Slovak nation]
- O úhoroch a i včelách rozmlúváňí (1801) [A discussion about fallows and also about bees]
- Slovenskí včelár (1802) [The Diligent House]

== Works online ==
- Anti-Fándly aneb Dúverné Zmlúwánj mezi Theodulusem, tretího Franciskánúw rádu bosákem, a Gurem Fándly, ... W Halle: [s.n.], 1789. 62 p. - available at ULB's Digital Library
- FÁNDLY, J., BAJZA, J. I., BERNOLÁK, A. Ešče Ňečo o Epigrammatéch, anebožto Málorádkoch M. W. P. Gozefa Bagza nowotného slowenského Epi Grammatistu ... [Pole Eliziské]: [s.n.], [1791]. 15 p. - available at ULB's Digital Library
