= Igram =

Igram Igrám
- Municipality
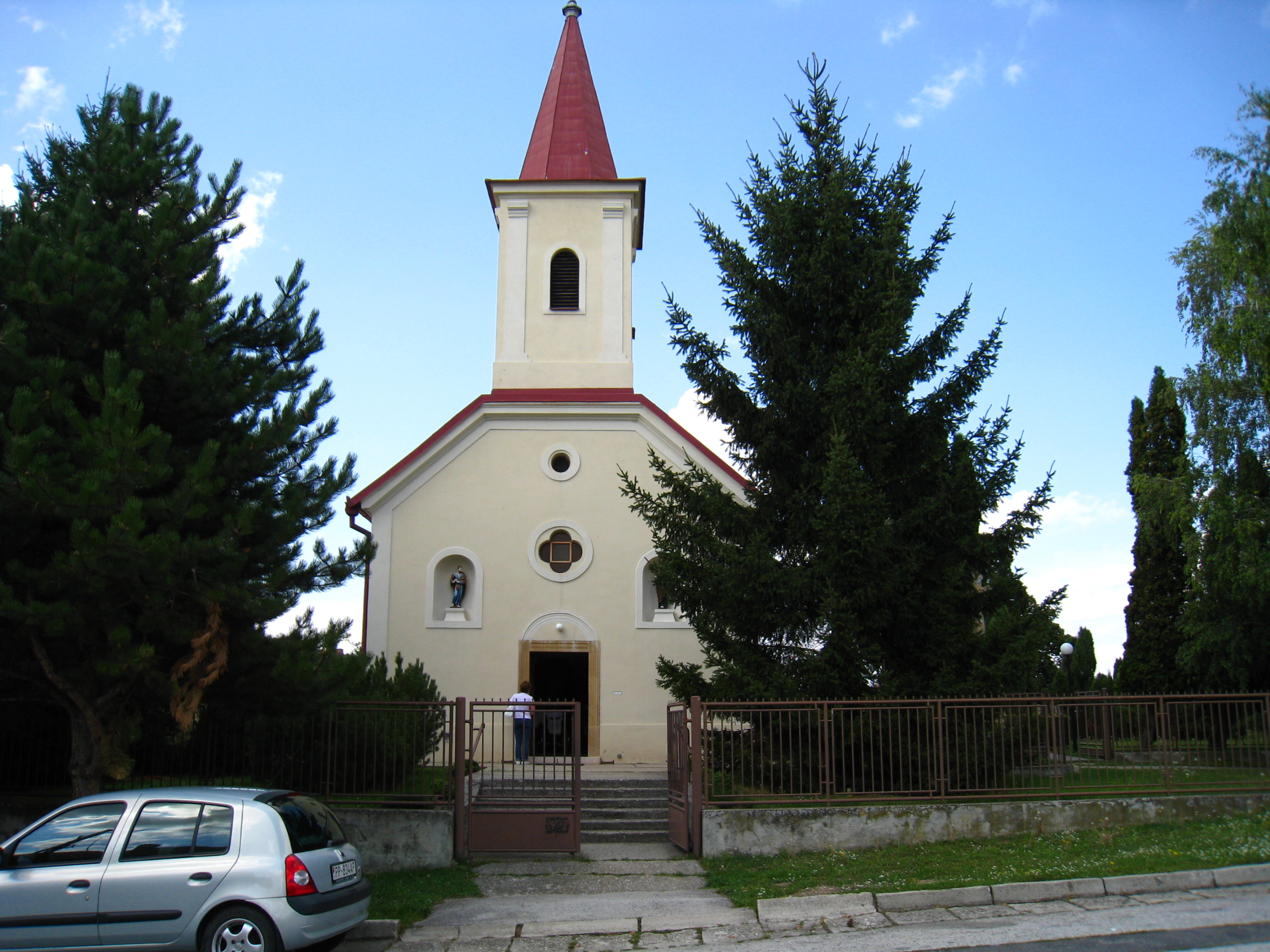
- Saint Imrich Church

- Flag

- Location of Igram in the Bratislava Region Location of Igram in Slovakia
- Coordinates: 48.28°N 17.47°E
- Country: Slovakia
- Region: Bratislava Region
- District: Senec District
- First mentioned: 1244

Area
  - Total: 8.30 km^{2} (3.20 sq mi)
- Elevation: 144 m (472 ft)

Population (2025)
  - Total: 564
- Time zone: UTC+1 (CET)
  - Summer (DST): UTC+2 (CEST)
- Postal code: 900 84
- Area code: +421 33
- Vehicle registration plate (until 2022): SC
- Website: www.igram.sk

Igram (Hungarian: Igrám) is a village and municipality in western Slovakia in Senec District in the Bratislava Region. It is located northeast of Senec, between the villages of Kaplna and Čataj. Currently, the village has around 550 inhabitants.

== History ==
The first written reference to the town was made in 1244. Hungarian king Béla IV mentioned the village, under the name Igrech, in a document in which he established a new church district. The name, which is said to have been derived from "Igrici", is an old Slavic word for musicians, had gone through several changes until it stabilized at its current form as Igram.

Between 1974 and 1990 the village was part of Báhoň.

== Geography ==
The municipality lies at an altitude of 144 metres (472 ft) and covers an area of 8.30 km^{2} (3.20 sq mi) (2025).

== Population ==
Population statistic (10 years)
Year	1995	2005	2015	2025
Count	606	534	562	564
Difference		−11.88%	+5.24%	+0.35%

Population statistic
Year	2024	2025
Count	569	564
Difference		−0.87%

It has a population of 564 people (31 December 2025).

=== Ethnicity ===
Census 2021 (1+ %)
Ethnicity	Number	Fraction
Slovak	561	95.08%
Not found out	24	4.06%
Total	590	

In year 2021 was 590 people by ethnicity 561 as Slovak, 24 as Not found out, 5 as Hungarian, 3 as Other, 2 as Czech, 1 as Rusyn, 1 as Russian, 1 as German and 1 as English.

Note on population: The difference values of population numbers in the table "Population statistic" and in the sections "Ethnicity" & "Religion" is caused by the use of various statistical methods.

=== Religion ===
Census 2021 (1+ %)
Religion	Number	Fraction
Roman Catholic Church	444	75.25%
None	97	16.44%
Not found out	24	4.07%
Evangelical Church	12	2.03%
Total	590	

In year 2021 was 590 people by religion 444 from Roman Catholic Church, 97 from None, 24 from Not found out, 12 from Evangelical Church, 4 from Christian Congregations in Slovakia, 4 from Greek Catholic Church, 2 from Calvinist Church, 1 from Other and not ascertained christian church, 1 from Other and 1 from Buddhism.

== Culture and entertainment ==
The village has a well known folk band, called Igramčan, founded in 1923. This band serves as the cornerstone for annual folk fests called Juniáles. In 1975, Igram founded its folk dance group, still called Igramčan. Both groups perform their shows on numerous municipal festivities.

The town also features a soccer team, which has been playing in the Slovak second-lowest Fifth division soccer league for the past several years.
