= Častá =

Častá Cseszte
- Municipality
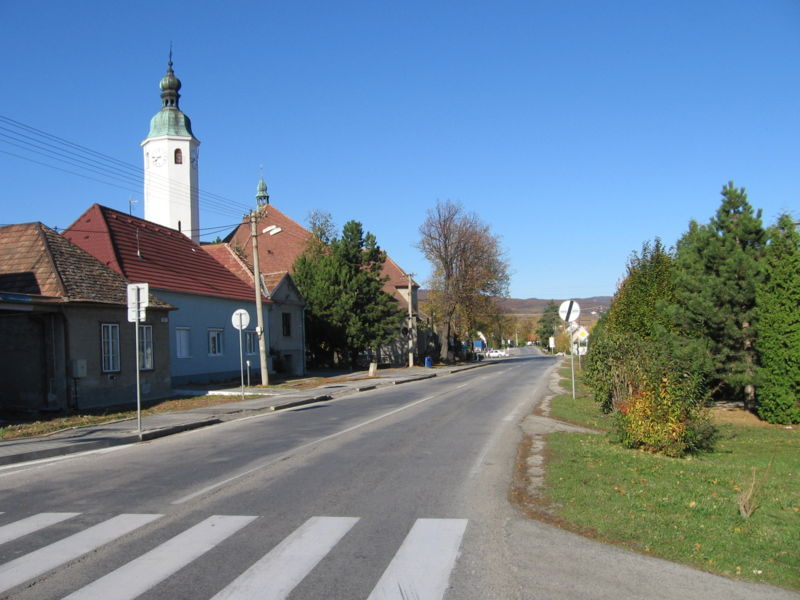
- Main street in Častá

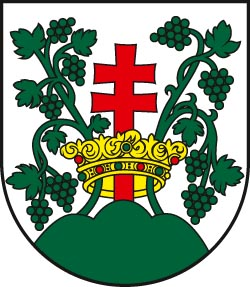
- Flag Coat of arms

- Location of Častá in the Bratislava Region Location of Častá in Slovakia
- Coordinates: 48.38°N 17.37°E
- Country: Slovakia
- Region: Bratislava Region
- District: Pezinok District
- First mentioned: 1240

Government
  - Mayor: František Kašický (SMER-SD, HLAS-SD)

Area
  - Total: 35.23 km^{2} (13.60 sq mi)
- Elevation: 292 m (958 ft)

Population (2025)
  - Total: 2,400
- Time zone: UTC+1 (CET)
  - Summer (DST): UTC+2 (CEST)
- Postal code: 900 89
- Area code: +421 33
- Vehicle registration plate (until 2022): PK
- Website: www.casta.sk

Častá (Hungarian: Cseszte, German: Schattmannsdorf) is a village and municipality in western Slovakia in Pezinok District in the Bratislava Region, on the foothills of the Little Carpathians. The village is best known for the Červený Kameň Castle, which is above the village.

== History ==
The village was first mentioned in 1296, when it was established as a settlement under the Červený Kameň Castle. From 1944 to 1953, Častá had the village of Píla as its part.

== Geography ==
The municipality lies at an altitude of 292 metres (958 ft) and covers an area of 35.23 km^{2} (13.60 sq mi) (2025).

== Population ==
Population statistic (10 years)
Year	1995	2005	2015	2025
Count	1947	2078	2233	2400
Difference		+6.72%	+7.45%	+7.47%

Population statistic
Year	2024	2025
Count	2419	2400
Difference		−0.78%

It has a population of 2400 people (31 December 2025).

=== Ethnicity ===
Census 2021 (1+ %)
Ethnicity	Number	Fraction
Slovak	2317	98.05%
Not found out	30	1.26%
Total	2363	

In year 2021 was 2363 people by ethnicity 2317 as Slovak, 30 as Not found out, 17 as Other, 14 as Czech, 8 as German, 6 as Hungarian, 5 as Polish, 5 as Canadian, 4 as Ukrainian, 3 as Vietnamese, 3 as Rusyn, 2 as Russian, 2 as Moravian, 1 as Serbian, 1 as Romani, 1 as Croatian and 1 as English.

Note on population: The difference values of population numbers in the table "Population statistic" and in the sections "Ethnicity" & "Religion" is caused by the use of various statistical methods.

=== Religion ===
Census 2021 (1+ %)
Religion	Number	Fraction
Roman Catholic Church	1638	69.32%
None	576	24.38%
Evangelical Church	64	2.71%
Not found out	28	1.18%
Total	2363	

In year 2021 was 2363 people by religion 1638 from Roman Catholic Church, 576 from None, 64 from Evangelical Church, 28 from Not found out, 17 from Christian Congregations in Slovakia, 11 from Greek Catholic Church, 5 from Other, 5 from Ad hoc movements, 4 from Other and not ascertained christian church, 3 from Jehovah's Witnesses, 3 from Buddhism, 2 from Old Catholic Church, 2 from Calvinist Church, 2 from Eastern Orthodox Church, 1 from Jewish community, 1 from Seventh-day Adventist Church and 1 from Apostolic Church.

== Events ==
Hiking: "Častá's Fifty" (Častovská pädesiatka). Every year on 8 May a day hike takes place crossing the Little Carpathians to Záhorie and back usually starting at the gas station in Častá (6:00-9:30am) finishing on Častá's football field restaurant. You can choose 50-, 35-, 25-, or 12-km trails.

== Famous people ==
- Juraj Fándly, writer

== See also ==
- List of municipalities and towns in Slovakia

== Genealogical resources ==
The records for genealogical research are available at the state archive "Statny Archiv in Bratislava, Slovakia"

- Roman Catholic church records (births/marriages/deaths): 1639-1896 (parish A)
