= Slovenský Grob =

Slovenský Grob Tótgurab
- Municipality
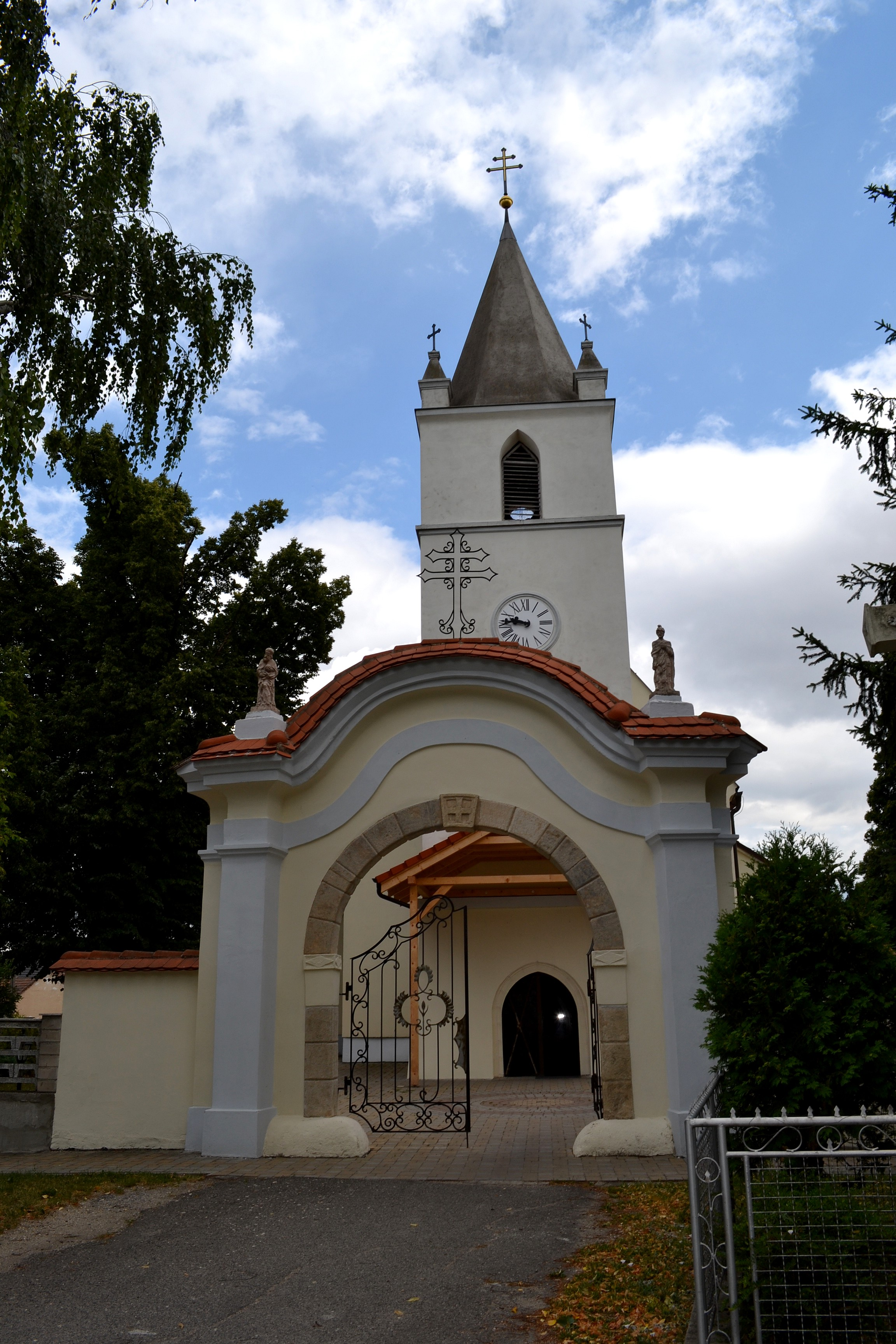
- Church of Saint John the Baptist

- Flag

- Location of Slovenský Grob in the Bratislava Region Location of Slovenský Grob in Slovakia
- Coordinates: 48.25°N 17.28°E
- Country: Slovakia
- Region: Bratislava Region
- District: Pezinok District
- First mentioned: 1600

Area
  - Total: 10.17 km^{2} (3.93 sq mi)
- Elevation: 139 m (456 ft)

Population (2025)
  - Total: 6,290
- Time zone: UTC+1 (CET)
  - Summer (DST): UTC+2 (CEST)
- Postal code: 900 26
- Area code: +421 33
- Vehicle registration plate (until 2022): PK
- Website: slovensky-grob.sk

Slovenský Grob (Hungarian: Tótgurab; German: Slowakisch-Eisgrub, Böhmisch-Grub, Slawisch-Weissgrob) is a village and municipality in western Slovakia in Pezinok District in the Bratislava region.

Slovenský Grob, in the foothills of the Small Carpathians, is geographically disposed to the rearing of geese. Its lakes, marshes and rich pastures – the result of a brook that formerly coursed through the village – are all factors in producing the ideal gosherding landscape.

== Geography ==
The municipality lies at an altitude of 139 metres (456 ft) and covers an area of 10.17 km^{2} (3.93 sq mi) (2025).

== Population ==
Population statistic (10 years)
Year	1995	2005	2015	2025
Count	1727	1934	2846	6290
Difference		+11.98%	+47.15%	+121.01%

Population statistic
Year	2024	2025
Count	6133	6290
Difference		+2.55%

It has a population of 6290 people (31 December 2025).

=== Ethnicity ===
Census 2021 (1+ %)
Ethnicity	Number	Fraction
Slovak	4725	90.83%
Not found out	365	7.01%
Total	5202	

In year 2021 was 5202 people by ethnicity 4725 as Slovak, 365 as Not found out, 42 as Czech, 37 as Hungarian, 27 as Other, 25 as Ukrainian, 21 as Rusyn, 15 as Vietnamese, 10 as Russian, 10 as Croatian, 9 as Romani, 4 as Italian, 4 as French, 4 as Albanian, 3 as German, 2 as Jewish, 2 as Irish, 2 as Serbian, 2 as Romanian, 2 as Polish, 1 as Austrian, 1 as Greek and 1 as Bulgarian.

Note on population: The difference values of population numbers in the table "Population statistic" and in the sections "Ethnicity" & "Religion" is caused by the use of various statistical methods.

=== Religion ===
Census 2021 (1+ %)
Religion	Number	Fraction
Roman Catholic Church	2776	53.36%
None	1696	32.6%
Not found out	357	6.86%
Evangelical Church	160	3.08%
Total	5202	

In year 2021 was 5202 people by religion 2776 from Roman Catholic Church, 1696 from None, 357 from Not found out, 160 from Evangelical Church, 49 from Greek Catholic Church, 27 from Eastern Orthodox Church, 21 from Other and not ascertained christian church, 19 from Ad hoc movements, 18 from Christian Congregations in Slovakia, 17 from Other, 9 from Calvinist Church, 9 from Islam, 9 from Buddhism, 7 from Jehovah's Witnesses, 7 from Apostolic Church, 5 from United Methodist Church, 4 from Jewish community, 2 from Old Catholic Church, 2 from Paganism and natural spirituality, 2 from Hinduism, 2 from Church of the Brethren, 2 from Seventh-day Adventist Church, 1 from Czechoslovak Hussite Church and 1 from Baptists Church.
