= Budmerice Mansion =

Medieval castle in Slovakia

- Budmerice, Slovakia
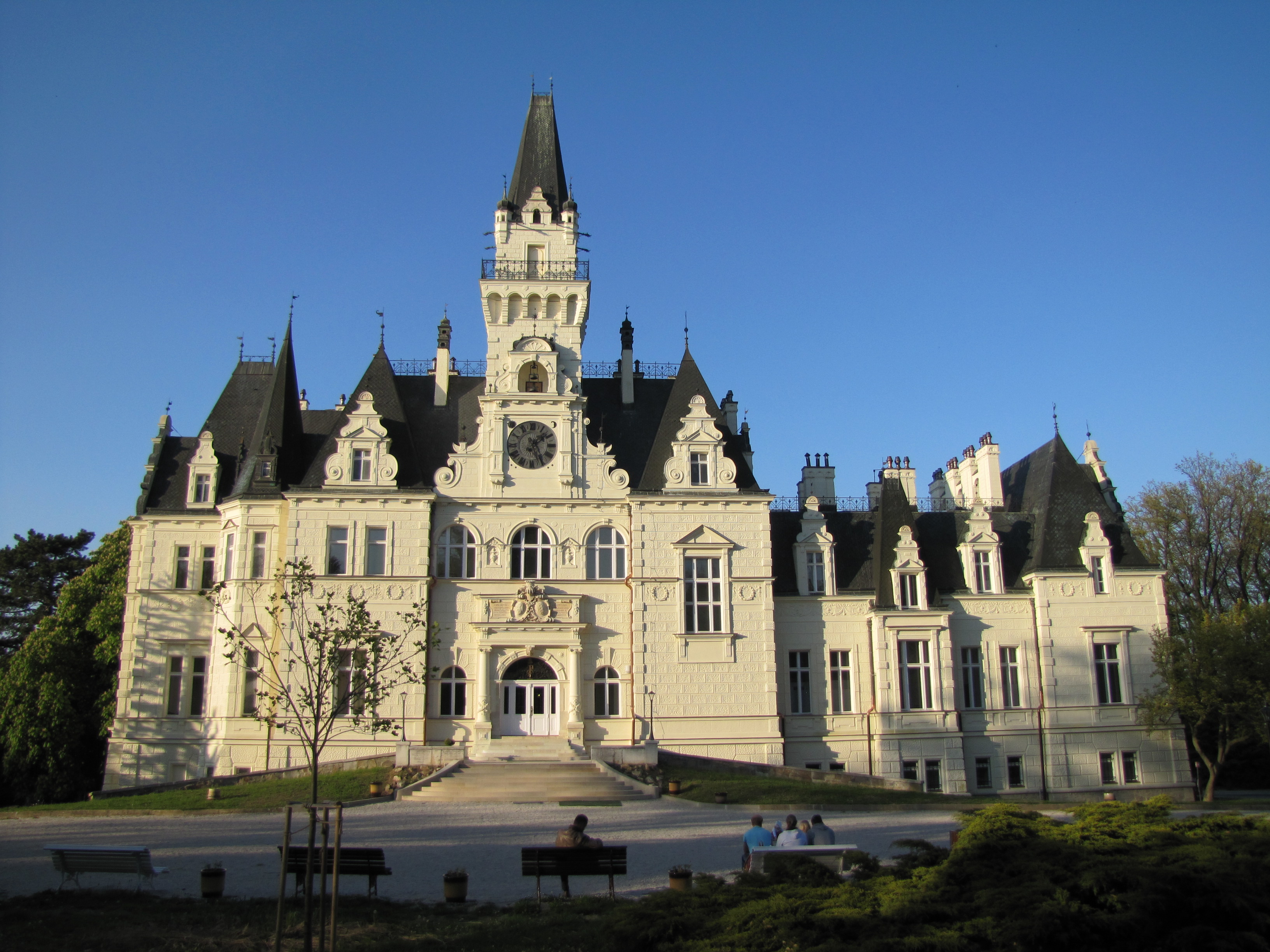
- View of the manor house from the park.

Site information
- Condition: Good

Location
- Location in Slovakia
- Location within Slovakia
- Coordinates: 48.3632°N 17.3962°E

Site history
- Built: 19th century

The Budmerice mansion is a manor house in Budmerice, a municipality in western Slovakia. It was built in 1889 by the Pálffy family.

== History ==
The Budmerice mansion was designed by a Viennese architect by the name of Franz von Neumann. The mansion was built for János Pálffy and Elisabeth Schlippenbach who got married in the same year as it was completed. It served mainly as Pálffy's hunting manor.

When János Pálffy died in 1934 his whole estate was inherited by his son Pál. After Pál Pálffy emigrated from the country in 1945, the mansion with its park became the property of the Czechoslovak republic. In the 1950s, the state made the mansion available for use to the Association of Slovak Writers.

The manor house was built in an eclectic style but drew inspiration from castles of the Loire Valley in France. It is surrounded by an extensive English park. The architectural style of the mansion has few parallels in Slovakia.

== Recent use ==
The mansion was used by the Association of Slovak Writers until 2011 for writing retreats and occasional events. The Association considered the lease renewal terms as too expensive to continue renting the mansion. It was subsequently closed down for renovation which was completed in 2015 when parts of the mansion became open to public.

After the Slovak Ministry of Culture took over the administration of the manor house from the Budmerice municipality, the mansion was made inaccessible to the public (as of 2024).

According to a building inspection conducted in 2023, the mansion is in a good condition.

== See also ==
- List of castles in Slovakia
- Bratislava Region
