= Dubová, Pezinok District =

Dubová Cserfalu
- Municipality
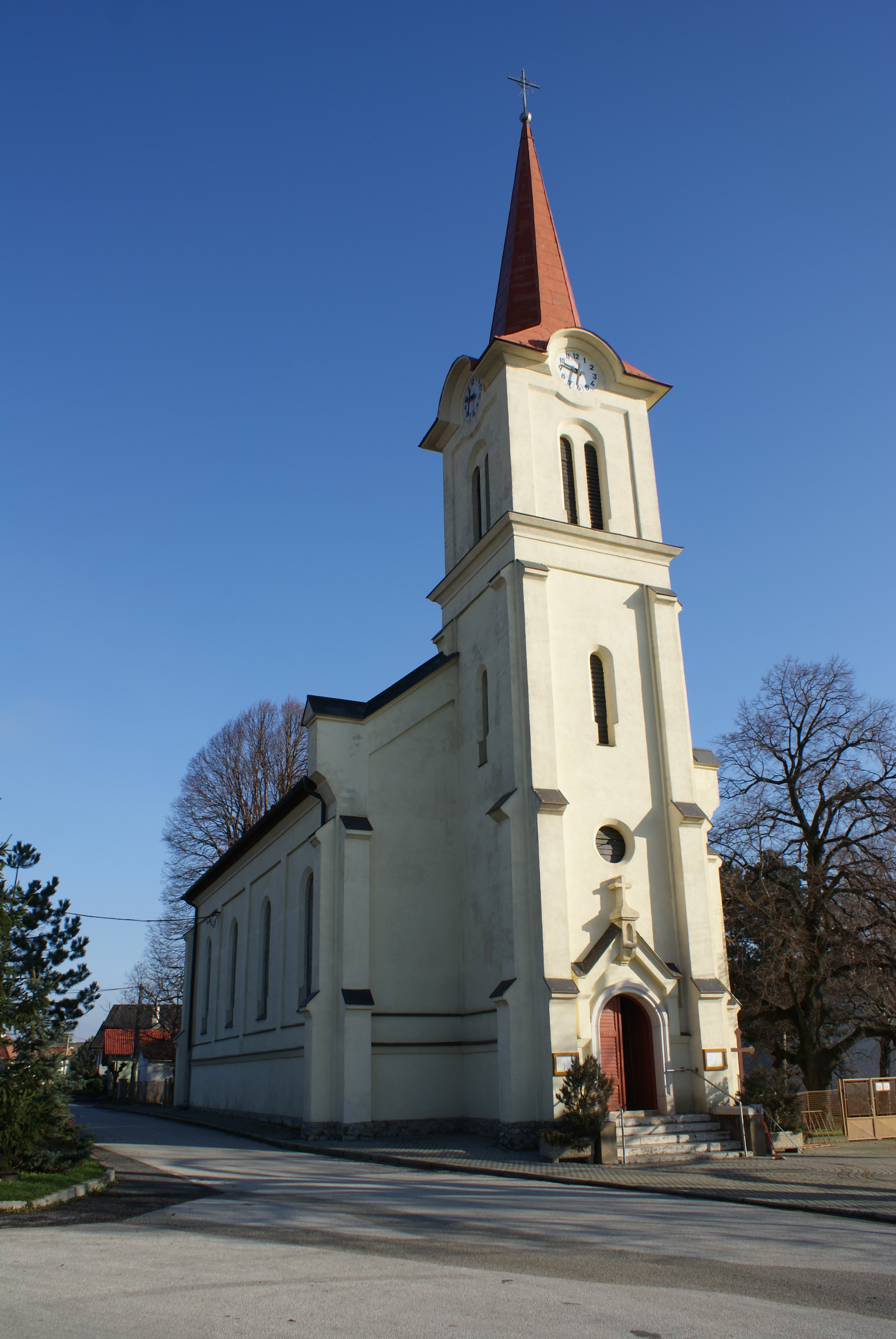

- Flag

- Location of Dubová in the Bratislava Region Location of Dubová in Slovakia
- Coordinates: 48.37°N 17.33°E
- Country: Slovakia
- Region: Bratislava Region
- District: Pezinok District
- First mentioned: 1113

Area
  - Total: 13.79 km^{2} (5.32 sq mi)
- Elevation: 224 m (735 ft)

Population (2025)
  - Total: 1,207
- Time zone: UTC+1 (CET)
  - Summer (DST): UTC+2 (CEST)
- Postal code: 900 90
- Area code: +421 33
- Vehicle registration plate (until 2022): PK
- Website: www.dubova.sk

Dubová (Hungarian: Cserfalu, German: Wernersdorf) is a village and municipality in western Slovakia in Pezinok District in the Bratislava region.

== Geography ==
The municipality lies at an altitude of 224 metres (735 ft) and covers an area of 13.79 km^{2} (5.32 sq mi) (2025).

== Population ==
Population statistic (10 years)
| Year | 1995 | 2005 | 2015 | 2025 |
|---|---|---|---|---|
| Count | 816 | 899 | 1010 | 1207 |
| Difference | | +10.17% | +12.34% | +19.50% |

Population statistic
| Year | 2024 | 2025 |
|---|---|---|
| Count | 1194 | 1207 |
| Difference | | +1.08% |

It has a population of 1207 people (31 December 2025).

=== Ethnicity ===
Census 2021 (1+ %)
| Ethnicity | Number | Fraction |
|---|---|---|
| Slovak | 1088 | 95.27% |
| Not found out | 52 | 4.55% |
| Total | 1142 | |

In year 2021 was 1142 people by ethnicity 1088 as Slovak, 52 as Not found out, 5 as Czech, 3 as Hungarian, 2 as Russian, 1 as Austrian and 1 as Other.

Note on population: The difference values of population numbers in the table "Population statistic" and in the sections "Ethnicity" & "Religion" is caused by the use of various statistical methods.

=== Religion ===
Census 2021 (1+ %)
| Religion | Number | Fraction |
|---|---|---|
| Roman Catholic Church | 705 | 61.73% |
| None | 312 | 27.32% |
| Not found out | 52 | 4.55% |
| Evangelical Church | 41 | 3.59% |
| Greek Catholic Church | 12 | 1.05% |
| Total | 1142 | |

In year 2021 was 1142 people by religion 705 from Roman Catholic Church, 312 from None, 52 from Not found out, 41 from Evangelical Church, 12 from Greek Catholic Church, 5 from Other, 5 from Ad hoc movements, 3 from Jehovah's Witnesses, 2 from Old Catholic Church, 2 from Buddhism, 1 from Paganism and natural spirituality, 1 from Other and not ascertained christian church and 1 from Hinduism.

== Genealogical resources ==
The records for genealogical research are available at the state archive "Statny Archiv in Bratislava, Slovakia"

- Roman Catholic church records (births/marriages/deaths): 1758-1899 (parish A)

== See also ==
- List of municipalities and towns in Slovakia
