= Červený Kameň Castle =

Coordinates: 48°23′30″N 17°20′07″E

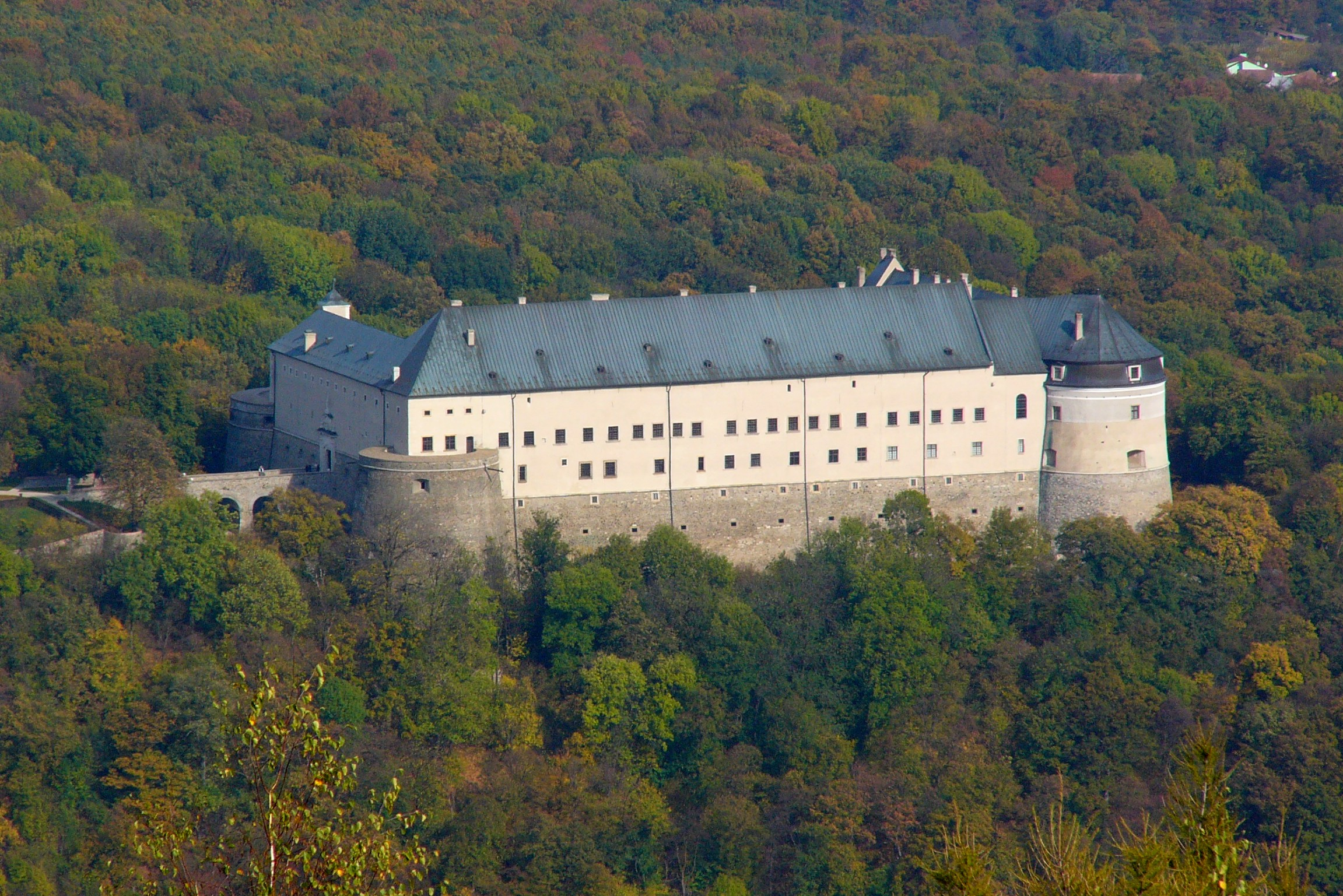
Červený Kameň

Červený Kameň Castle (Slovak: Hrad Červený Kameň, Hungarian: Vöröskő vára, German: Bibersburg, earlier Rotenstein) is a 13th-century castle in southwestern Slovakia in the Little Carpathians near the village of Častá.

== History ==
A stone castle was built by Tiburtius Rosd or his descendants in the 13th century as part of the chain of the Kingdom of Hungary’s frontier defense castles ranging from Pressburg to Žilina (Hungarian: Zsolna). This castle was completely rebuilt as a fortress in the first half of the 16th century. When the Pálffy family acquired the castle in 1588, the fortress was completed, and it became a representative noble castle.

Although the castle was damaged several times by fire, it was always reconstructed by the Pálffys, who were the owners of the castle until the Second World War. Today, the castle is a museum.

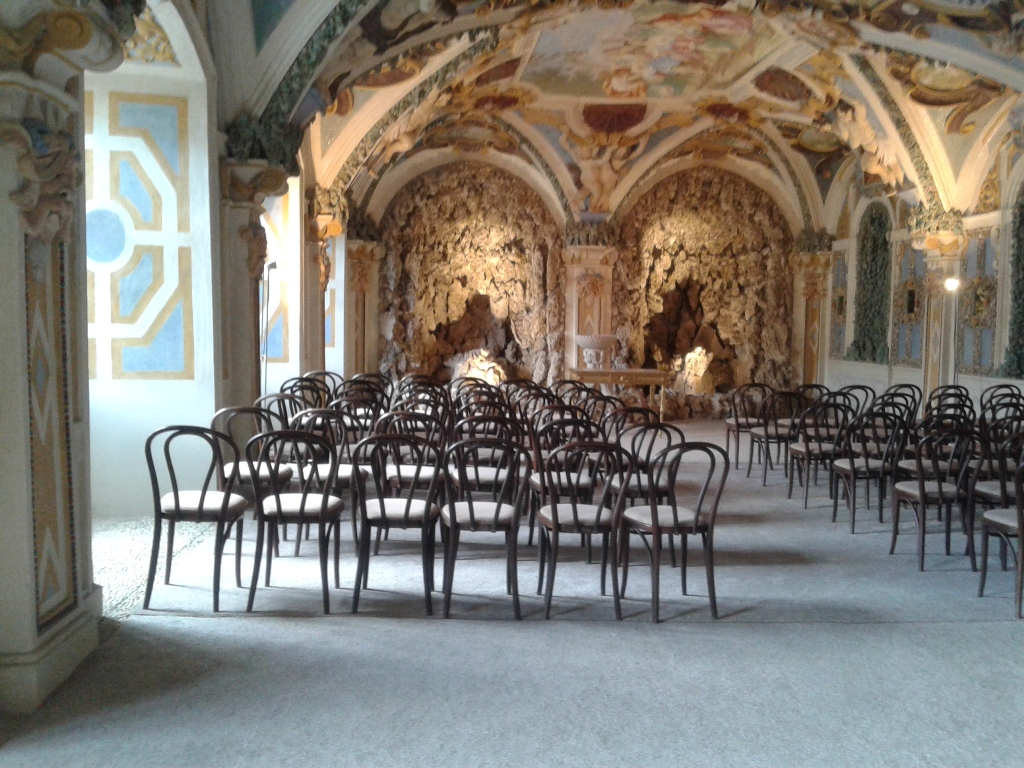
A decorated room in Červený Kameň castle, Slovakia

== See also ==
- List of castles in Slovakia

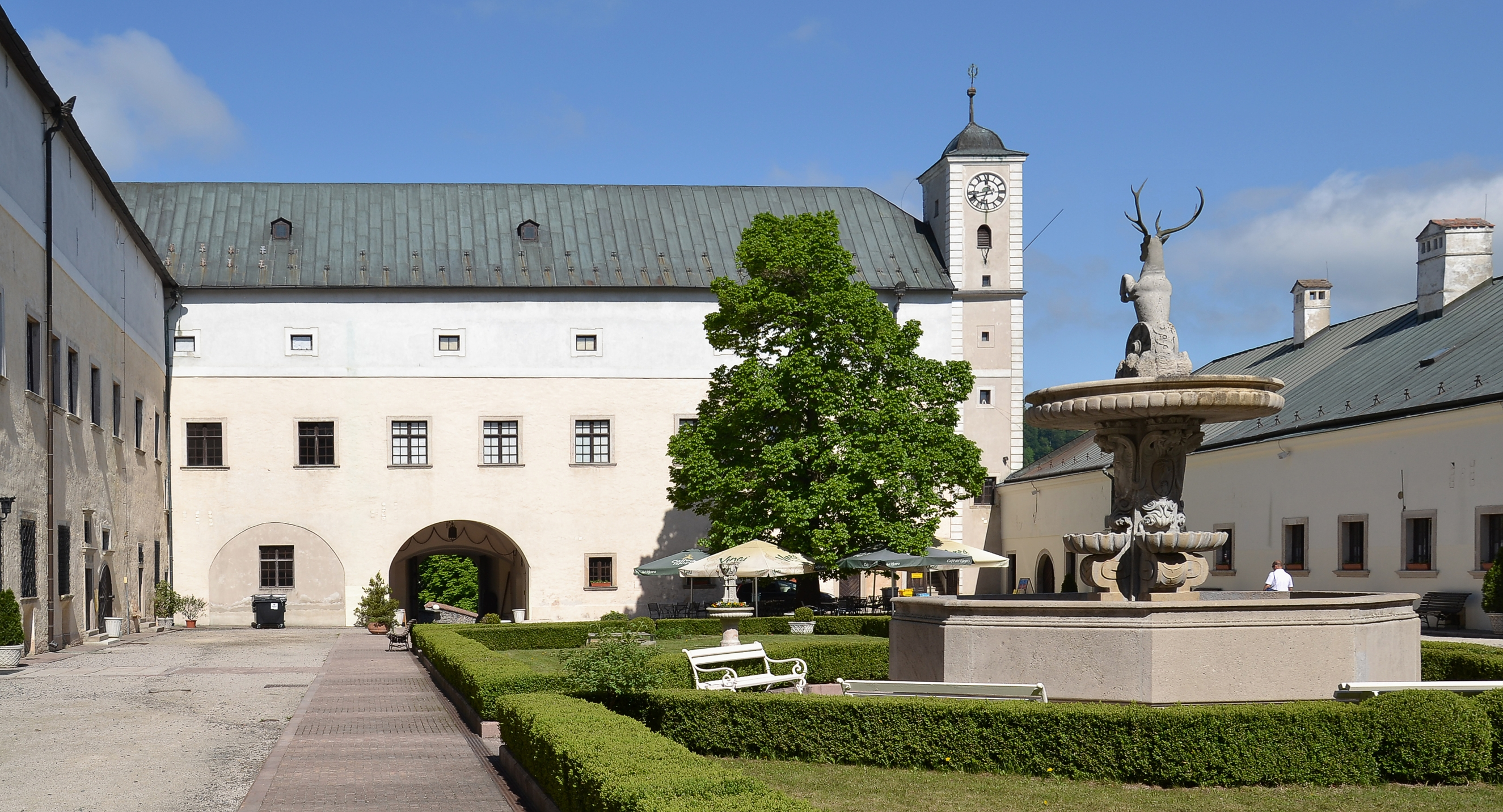
Courtyard of the castle
