= Pezinok District =

Coordinates: 48°17′19″N 17°16′4″E

- District
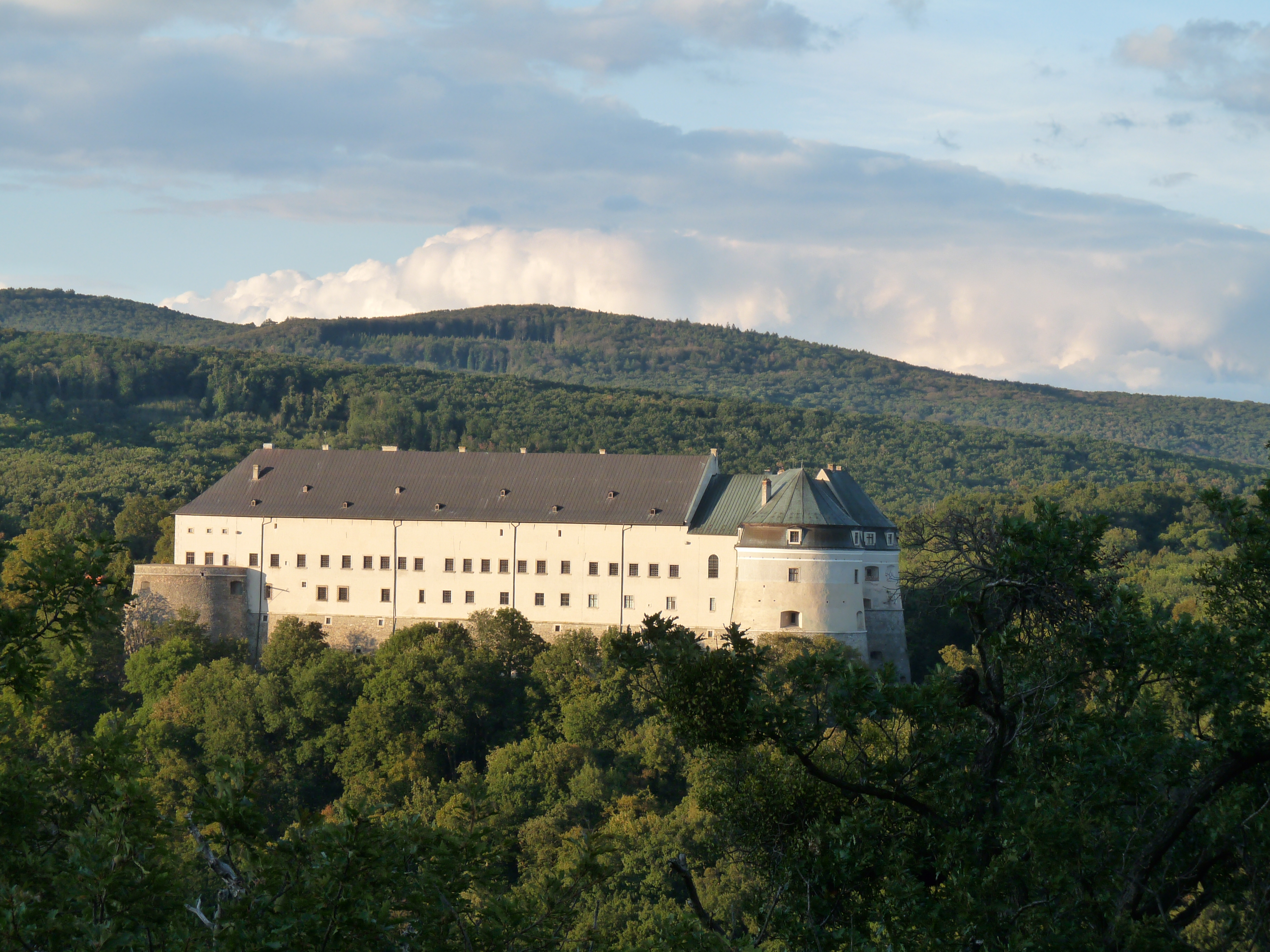
- Country: Slovakia
- Region (kraj): Bratislava Region
- Seat: Pezinok

Area
  - Total: 375.53 km^{2} (144.99 sq mi)

Population (2025)
  - Total: 70,096
- Time zone: UTC+1 (CET)
  - Summer (DST): UTC+2 (CEST)
- Telephone prefix: 033
- Vehicle registration plate (until 2022): PK
- Municipalities: 17

Pezinok District (okres Pezinok) is a district in the Bratislava Region of western Slovakia The district had been established in 1996, from 1923 was its area part of Modra District. It is situated on the foothills of Little Carpathians hills, and is known for its vineyard production. Industry is located mostly in its seat, town of Pezinok, which is the largest district municipality. Of cultural importance is the town of Modra. Many inhabitants daily travel to Bratislava for work, shopping, or education.

== Population ==
Historical population
Year	Pop.	±%
1970	48,546	—
1980	50,982	+5.0%
1991	52,078	+2.1%
2001	54,164	+4.0%
2011	57,567	+6.3%
2021	69,183	+20.2%
Source: Censuses

Population statistic (10 years)
Year	1995	2005	2015	2025
Count	53,280	55,939	61,504	70,096
Difference		+4.99%	+9.94%	+13.96%

Population statistic
Year	2024	2025
Count	70,063	70,096
Difference		+0.04%

It has a population of 70,096 people (31 December 2025).

=== Ethnicity ===
Census 2021 (1+ %)
Ethnicity	Number	Fraction
Slovak	64,309	90.58%
Not found out	3840	5.4%
Total	70,994	

In year 2021 was 70,994 people by ethnicity 64,309 as Slovak, 3840 as Not found out, 681 as Czech, 447 as Hungarian, 343 as Other, 223 as Rusyn, 170 as German, 158 as Russian, 139 as Ukrainian, 130 as Romani, 61 as Croatian, 50 as Romanian, 49 as Vietnamese, 47 as Serbian, 47 as Polish, 43 as Bulgarian, 42 as Italian, 37 as Moravian, 30 as Austrian, 27 as Jewish, 22 as French, 20 as Canadian, 18 as Greek, 17 as English, 13 as Irish, 13 as Albanian, 8 as Chinese, 5 as Silesian, 4 as Turkish and 1 as Korean.

Note on population: The difference values of population numbers in the table "Population statistic" and in the sections "Ethnicity" & "Religion" is caused by the use of various statistical methods.

=== Religion ===
Census 2021 (1+ %)
Religion	Number	Fraction
Roman Catholic Church	35,786	51.73%
None	22,084	31.92%
Evangelical Church	4594	6.64%
Not found out	4071	5.88%
Total	69,183	

In year 2021 was 69,183 people by religion 35,786 from Roman Catholic Church, 22,084 from None, 4594 from Evangelical Church, 4071 from Not found out, 647 from Greek Catholic Church, 329 from Ad hoc movements, 288 from Other, 261 from Christian Congregations in Slovakia, 241 from Eastern Orthodox Church, 155 from Other and not ascertained christian church, 149 from Buddhism, 103 from Jehovah's Witnesses, 85 from Calvinist Church, 78 from Paganism and natural spirituality, 62 from Church of the Brethren, 57 from Apostolic Church, 42 from Islam, 29 from Jewish community, 29 from Baptists Church, 24 from Old Catholic Church, 24 from United Methodist Church, 14 from Seventh-day Adventist Church, 12 from Hinduism, 10 from Czechoslovak Hussite Church, 5 from Bahá'i Community and 4 from Church of Jesus Christ of Latter-day Saints.

== Municipalities ==
Municipality	Area [km^{2}]	Population
Báhoň	10.57	1,816
Budmerice	30.07	2,497
Častá	35.23	2,400
Doľany	22.54	1,071
Dubová	13.79	1,207
Jablonec	8.69	1,060
Limbach	15.37	2,449
Modra	49.62	9,055
Pezinok	72.75	24,340
Píla	0.47	372
Slovenský Grob	10.17	6,290
Svätý Jur	39.86	5,997
Šenkvice	24.80	5,325
Štefanová	6.72	403
Viničné	9.62	2,816
Vinosady	5.15	1,645
Vištuk	20.03	1,353

Population and area values are current for year 2025.
