= Štefanová, Pezinok District =

Štefanová Istvánkirályfalva
- Municipality
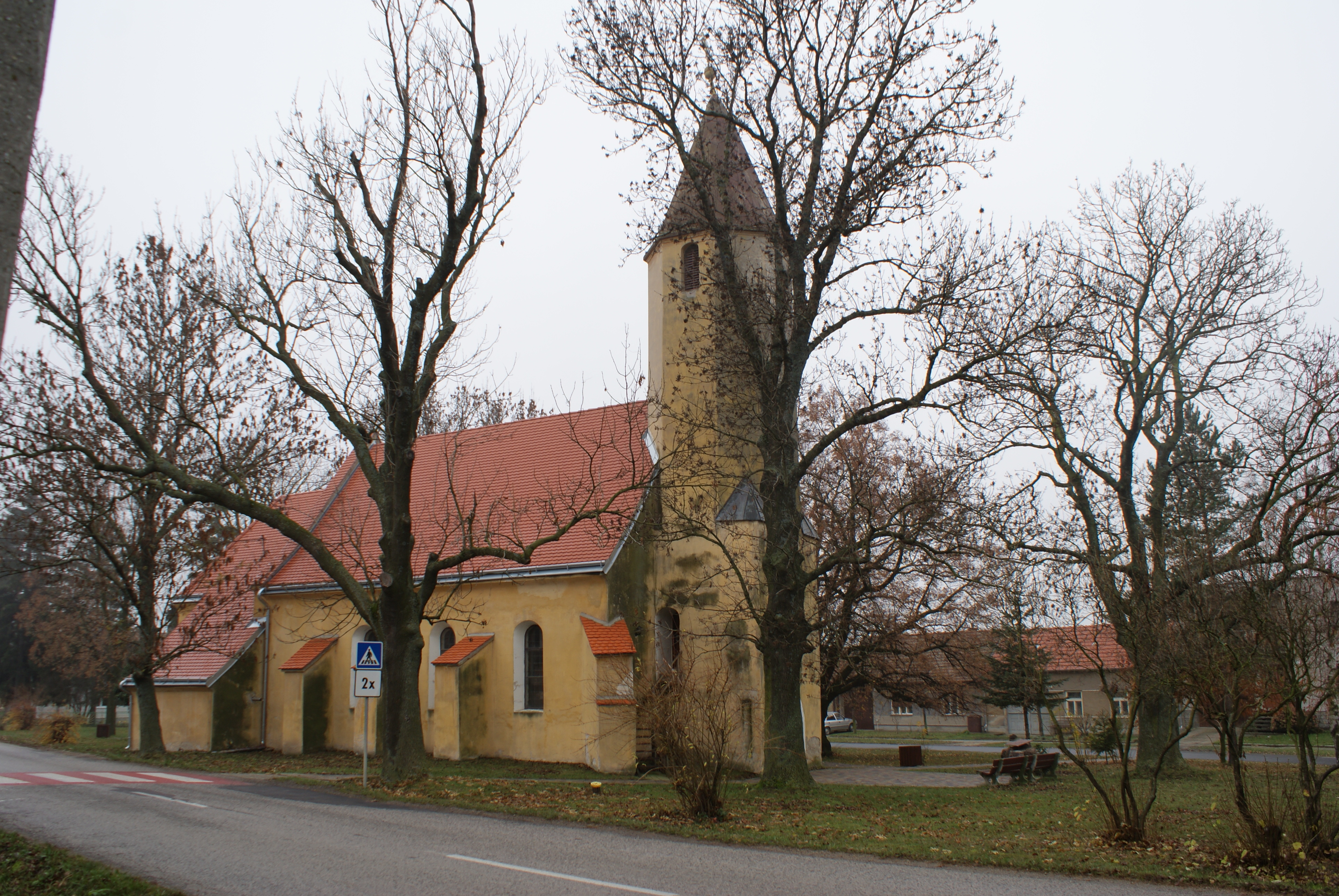
- Church in Štefanová

- Flag

- Location of Štefanová in the Bratislava Region Location of Štefanová in Slovakia
- Coordinates: 48.38°N 17.40°E
- Country: Slovakia
- Region: Bratislava Region
- District: Pezinok District
- First mentioned: 1588

Area
  - Total: 6.72 km^{2} (2.59 sq mi)
- Elevation: 191 m (627 ft)

Population (2025)
  - Total: 403
- Time zone: UTC+1 (CET)
  - Summer (DST): UTC+2 (CEST)
- Postal code: 900 86
- Area code: +421 33
- Vehicle registration plate (until 2022): PK
- Website: www.stefanova.sk

Štefanová (Hungarian: Istvánkirályfalva) is a village and municipality in western Slovakia in Pezinok District in the Bratislava region.

== Population ==
Population statistic (10 years)
Year	1995	2005	2015	2025
Count	347	320	354	403
Difference		−7.78%	+10.62%	+13.84%

Population statistic
Year	2024	2025
Count	395	403
Difference		+2.02%

It has a population of 403 people (31 December 2025).

=== Ethnicity ===
Census 2021 (1+ %)
Ethnicity	Number	Fraction
Slovak	361	93.04%
Not found out	13	3.35%
Czech	6	1.54%
Hungarian	5	1.28%
Total	388	

In year 2021 was 388 people by ethnicity 361 as Slovak, 13 as Not found out, 6 as Czech, 5 as Hungarian, 3 as Rusyn, 2 as Romani, 1 as Ukrainian, 1 as Austrian, 1 as Polish and 1 as Other.

Note on population: The difference values of population numbers in the table "Population statistic" and in the sections "Ethnicity" & "Religion" is caused by the use of various statistical methods.

=== Religion ===
Census 2021 (1+ %)
Religion	Number	Fraction
Roman Catholic Church	246	63.4%
None	100	25.77%
Not found out	13	3.35%
Evangelical Church	10	2.58%
Greek Catholic Church	5	1.29%
Total	388	

In year 2021 was 388 people by religion 246 from Roman Catholic Church, 100 from None, 13 from Not found out, 10 from Evangelical Church, 5 from Greek Catholic Church, 3 from Christian Congregations in Slovakia, 3 from Ad hoc movements, 2 from Eastern Orthodox Church, 2 from Buddhism, 1 from Jehovah's Witnesses, 1 from Czechoslovak Hussite Church, 1 from Church of the Brethren and 1 from Apostolic Church.

== See also ==
- List of municipalities and towns in Slovakia
