= Báhoň =

Báhoň Báhony
- Municipality
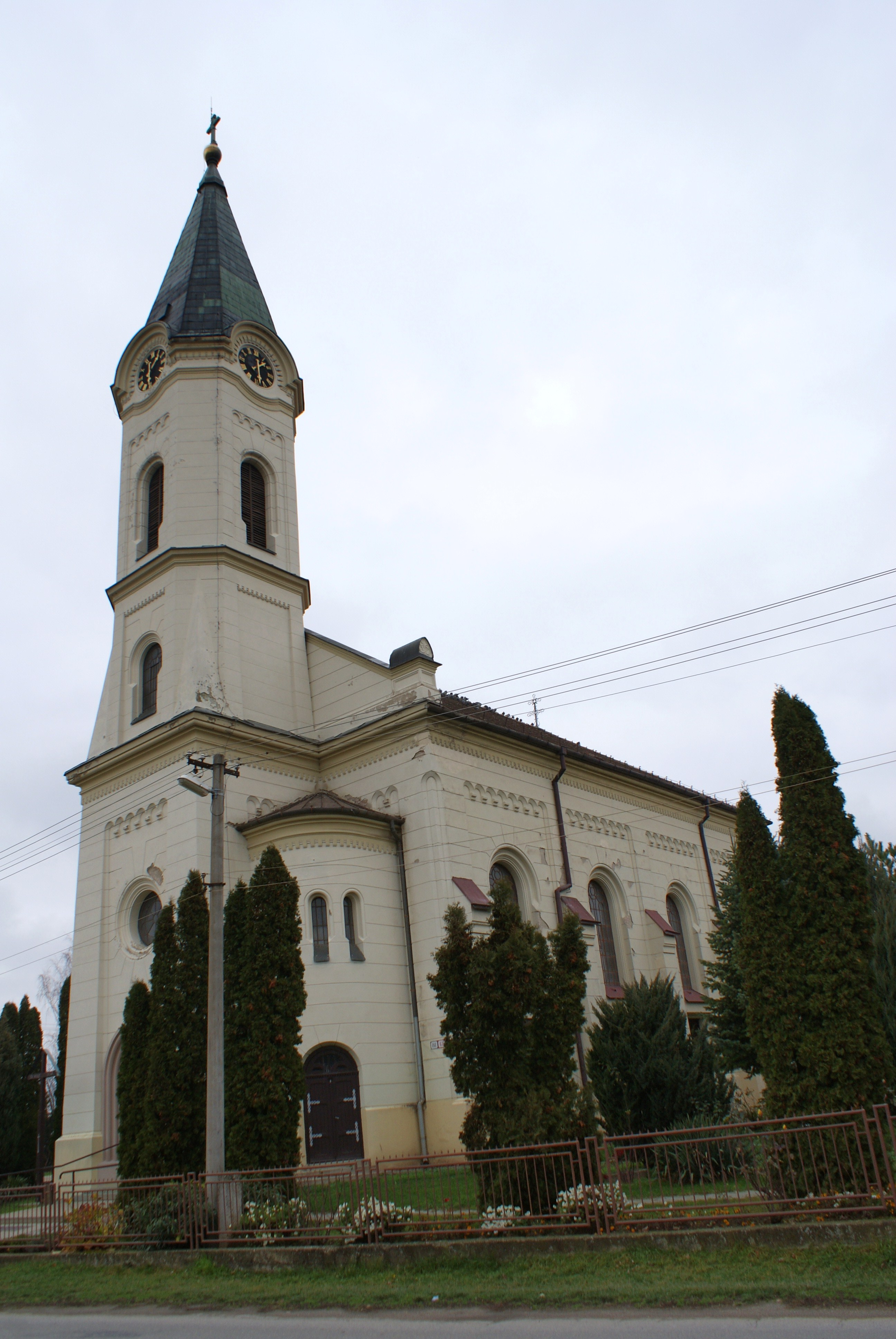
- Church of St. Francis of Assisi

- Flag

- Location of Báhoň in the Bratislava Region Location of Báhoň in Slovakia
- Coordinates: 48.31°N 17.44°E
- Country: Slovakia
- Region: Bratislava Region
- District: Pezinok District
- First mentioned: 1244

Area
  - Total: 10.57 km^{2} (4.08 sq mi)
- Elevation: 160 m (520 ft)

Population (2025)
  - Total: 1,816
- Time zone: UTC+1 (CET)
  - Summer (DST): UTC+2 (CEST)
- Postal code: 900 84
- Area code: +421 33
- Vehicle registration plate (until 2022): PK
- Website: www.bahon.sk

Báhoň (Hungarian: Báhony) is a village and municipality in western Slovakia in Pezinok District in the Bratislava Region. The village of roughly 1,833 people is located next to Kaplná, east of Pezinok and south-west of Trnava.

== History ==
The first written reference to the town comes from 1244. However, it is assumed that for the three hundred years before that Báhoň was owned by the Hungarian kings, attached to the Bratislava Castle estate. In the middle of the 16th century the town has experienced an influx of German colonists, who soon became dominant. Their dominance was defused half a century later when Croatian colonists moved in. The town became fully Slovak after the 1918 founding of Czechoslovakia.

In 1580, the ruling Jazernický family built a mansion, which was expanded and rebuilt in 1759-1765. The manor was rebuilt again in 1816 in Neoclassical style. The final renovation came in 1935-1936.

In 1845, the horse railway that connected Trnava with Bratislava opened, with a stop in Báhoň. This positively impacted the town's social and industrial development. After the electrified rail line between Žilina and Bratislava opened, Báhoň retained its train station.

Between 1914 and 1921, the Roman Catholic church of Saint Francis of Assisi was built by the renowned Slovak architect Milan Michal Harminc. In 1930, a manor house became a care home for the blind, and after World War II an electrical manufacturing facility customized for blind workers was opened.

Between 1974 and 1990, Báhoň was much larger than it is today, as it also included the villages of Kaplna and Igram.

== Economy and infrastructure ==
The village is best known for its vineyards. It lies on the "Low Carpathian Mountains Vine Route", a tourist-oriented wine tasting route that connects all major wine producing towns in the region.

Báhoň has nine shops, five pubs, a number of restaurants, and multiple small businesses focusing primarily on basic material processing, such as stone masonry, carpentry, and metal smithing.

The town also has a medical center and a dentist, as well as a school and kindergarten. In addition, it has a post office, public water and gas grid, and a sewage system connected to a sewage plant. This level of infrastructure is considered well developed, compared to neighboring villages.

== Culture and entertainment ==
The local church features a boys' choir. There is a library, and the town hall publishes a quarterly newsletter.

Báhoň also has a soccer team, which plays in Slovakia's lowest, Sixth Division soccer league. In addition, there is a public pool, tennis courts and a Judo training class.

== Geography ==
The municipality lies at an altitude of 160 metres (520 ft) and covers an area of 10.57 km^{2} (4.08 sq mi) (2025).

== Population ==
Population statistic (10 years)
Year	1995	2005	2015	2025
Count	1486	1656	1794	1816
Difference		+11.44%	+8.33%	+1.22%

Population statistic
Year	2024	2025
Count	1812	1816
Difference		+0.22%

It has a population of 1816 people (31 December 2025).

=== Ethnicity ===
Census 2021 (1+ %)
Ethnicity	Number	Fraction
Slovak	1816	96.64%
Not found out	46	2.44%
Total	1879	

In year 2021 was 1879 people by ethnicity 1816 as Slovak, 46 as Not found out, 14 as Hungarian, 10 as Rusyn, 9 as Russian, 9 as Other, 6 as Czech, 2 as Romani, 2 as Romanian, 2 as Croatian, 1 as Jewish, 1 as Ukrainian, 1 as Italian, 1 as Serbian, 1 as Austrian, 1 as Polish, 1 as German, 1 as Moravian and 1 as Bulgarian.

Note on population: The difference values of population numbers in the table "Population statistic" and in the sections "Ethnicity" & "Religion" is caused by the use of various statistical methods.

=== Religion ===
Census 2021 (1+ %)
Religion	Number	Fraction
Roman Catholic Church	1345	71.58%
None	398	21.18%
Not found out	54	2.87%
Evangelical Church	34	1.81%
Total	1879	

In year 2021 was 1879 people by religion 1345 from Roman Catholic Church, 398 from None, 54 from Not found out, 34 from Evangelical Church, 15 from Greek Catholic Church, 7 from Ad hoc movements, 6 from Eastern Orthodox Church, 6 from Jehovah's Witnesses, 6 from Christian Congregations in Slovakia, 3 from Other, 1 from Paganism and natural spirituality, 1 from Other and not ascertained christian church, 1 from Islam, 1 from Buddhism and 1 from Apostolic Church.

== Genealogical resources ==
The records for genealogical research are available at the state archive in Bratislava (Slovak: Štátny archív v Bratislave).

- Roman Catholic church records (births/marriages/deaths): 1703-1823, 1853-1901 (parish A)
- Lutheran church records (births/marriages/deaths): 1827-1896 (parish B), 1786-1895 (parish C)
- Census records 1869 of Bahon are not available at the state archive.

== See also ==
- List of municipalities and towns in Slovakia
