= Naháč =

- Municipality
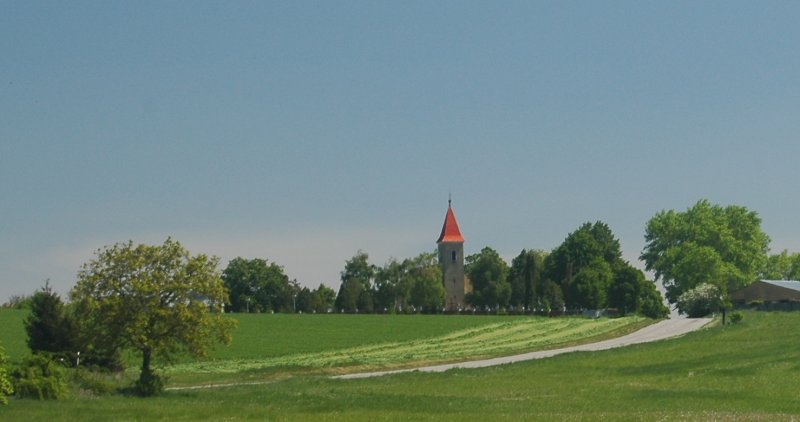

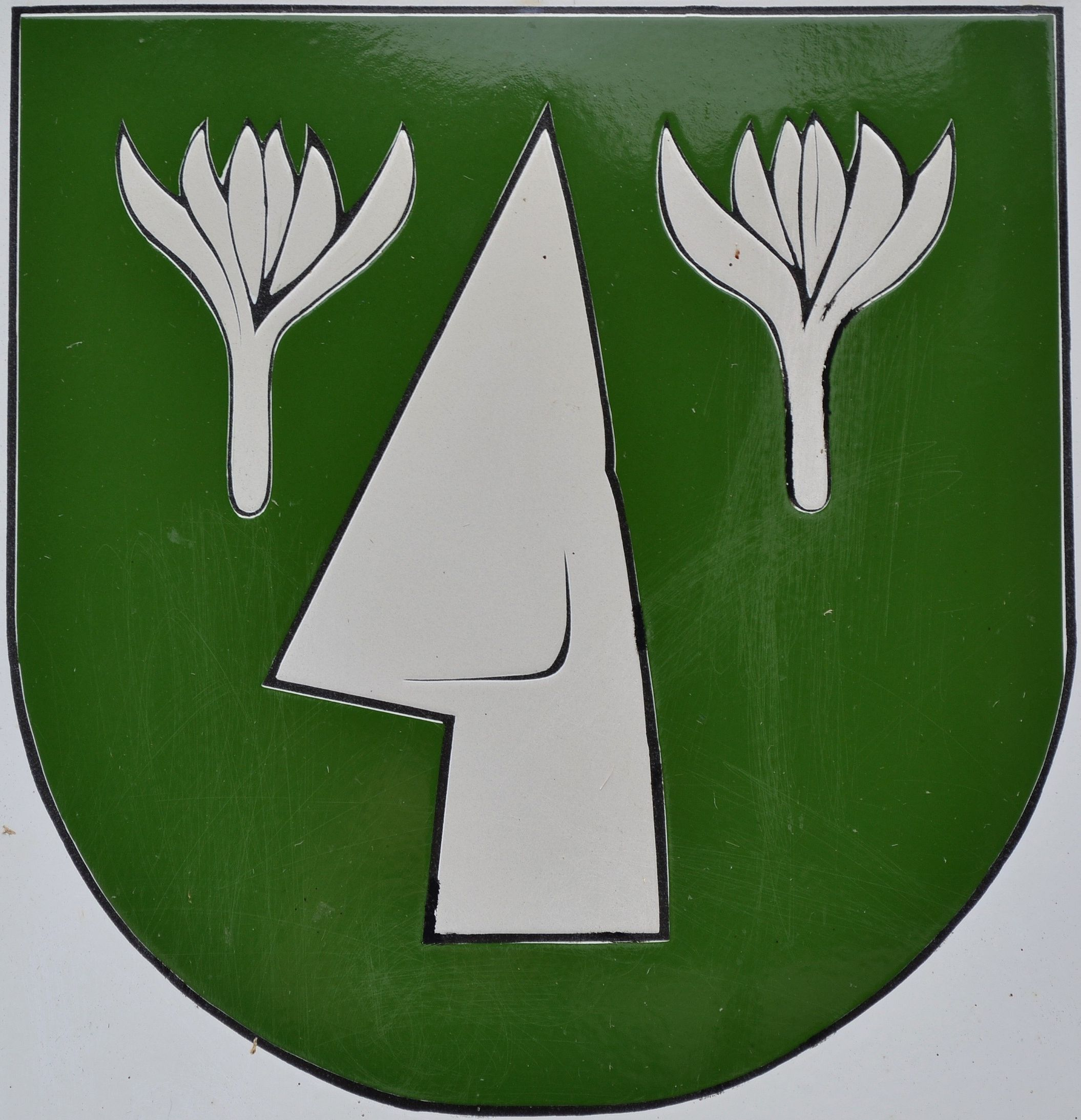
- Flag Coat of arms

- Location of Naháč in the Trnava Region Location of Naháč in Slovakia
- Coordinates: 48.53°N 17.53°E
- Country: Slovakia
- Region: Trnava Region
- District: Trnava District
- First mentioned: 1426

Area
  - Total: 19.67 km^{2} (7.59 sq mi)
- Elevation: 246 m (807 ft)

Population (2025)
  - Total: 398
- Time zone: UTC+1 (CET)
  - Summer (DST): UTC+2 (CEST)
- Postal code: 919 06
- Area code: +421 33
- Vehicle registration plate (until 2022): TT
- Website: www.obecnahac.sk

Naháč (Hungarian: Nahács) is a village and municipality of Trnava District in the Trnava region of Slovakia.

== Geography ==
The municipality lies at an altitude of 246 metres (807 ft) and covers an area of 19.67 km^{2} (7.59 sq mi) (2025).

== Population ==
Population statistic (10 years)
Year	1995	2005	2015	2025
Count	457	445	436	398
Difference		−2.62%	−2.02%	−8.71%

Population statistic
Year	2024	2025
Count	395	398
Difference		+0.75%

It has a population of 398 people (31 December 2025).

=== Ethnicity ===
Census 2021 (1+ %)
Ethnicity	Number	Fraction
Slovak	383	97.2%
Not found out	11	2.79%
Other	6	1.52%
Total	394	

In year 2021 was 394 people by ethnicity 383 as Slovak, 11 as Not found out, 6 as Other, 3 as Czech and 1 as Albanian.

Note on population: The difference values of population numbers in the table "Population statistic" and in the sections "Ethnicity" & "Religion" is caused by the use of various statistical methods.

=== Religion ===
Census 2021 (1+ %)
Religion	Number	Fraction
Roman Catholic Church	305	77.41%
None	61	15.48%
Not found out	11	2.79%
Evangelical Church	7	1.78%
Greek Catholic Church	5	1.27%
Total	394	

In year 2021 was 394 people by religion 305 from Roman Catholic Church, 61 from None, 11 from Not found out, 7 from Evangelical Church, 5 from Greek Catholic Church, 3 from Calvinist Church, 1 from Old Catholic Church and 1 from Other.

== Famous people ==
- Juraj Fándly, writer
