= Píla, Pezinok District =

Píla Gidrafűrész
- Municipality
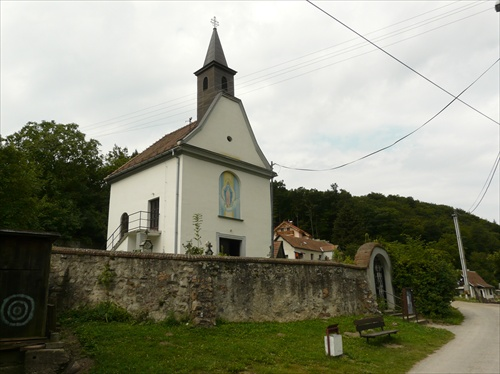
- Church in Píla

- Flag

- Location of Píla in the Bratislava Region Location of Píla in Slovakia
- Coordinates: 48.39°N 17.33°E
- Country: Slovakia
- Region: Bratislava Region
- District: Pezinok District
- First mentioned: 1602

Area
  - Total: 0.47 km^{2} (0.18 sq mi)
- Elevation: 244 m (801 ft)

Population (2025)
  - Total: 372
- Time zone: UTC+1 (CET)
  - Summer (DST): UTC+2 (CEST)
- Postal code: 900 89
- Area code: +421 33
- Vehicle registration plate (until 2022): PK
- Website: www.obecpila.sk

Píla (Hungarian: Gidrafűrész, German: Sägmühl) is a village and municipality in western Slovakia in Pezinok District in the Bratislava region.

== Population ==
Population statistic (10 years)
Year	1995	2005	2015	2025
Count	237	280	319	372
Difference		+18.14%	+13.92%	+16.61%

Population statistic
Year	2024	2025
Count	371	372
Difference		+0.26%

It has a population of 372 people (31 December 2025).

=== Ethnicity ===
Census 2021 (1+ %)
Ethnicity	Number	Fraction
Slovak	342	98.55%
Not found out	7	2.01%
Total	347	

In year 2021 was 347 people by ethnicity 342 as Slovak, 7 as Not found out, 3 as Other, 2 as Czech and 1 as Rusyn.

Note on population: The difference values of population numbers in the table "Population statistic" and in the sections "Ethnicity" & "Religion" is caused by the use of various statistical methods.

=== Religion ===
Census 2021 (1+ %)
Religion	Number	Fraction
Roman Catholic Church	203	58.5%
None	118	34.01%
Evangelical Church	8	2.31%
Christian Congregations in Slovakia	5	1.44%
Total	347	

In year 2021 was 347 people by religion 203 from Roman Catholic Church, 118 from None, 8 from Evangelical Church, 5 from Christian Congregations in Slovakia, 3 from Not found out, 3 from Greek Catholic Church, 2 from Paganism and natural spirituality, 2 from Other, 2 from Buddhism and 1 from Ad hoc movements.
