= Budmerice =

Budmerice Gidrafa
- Municipality
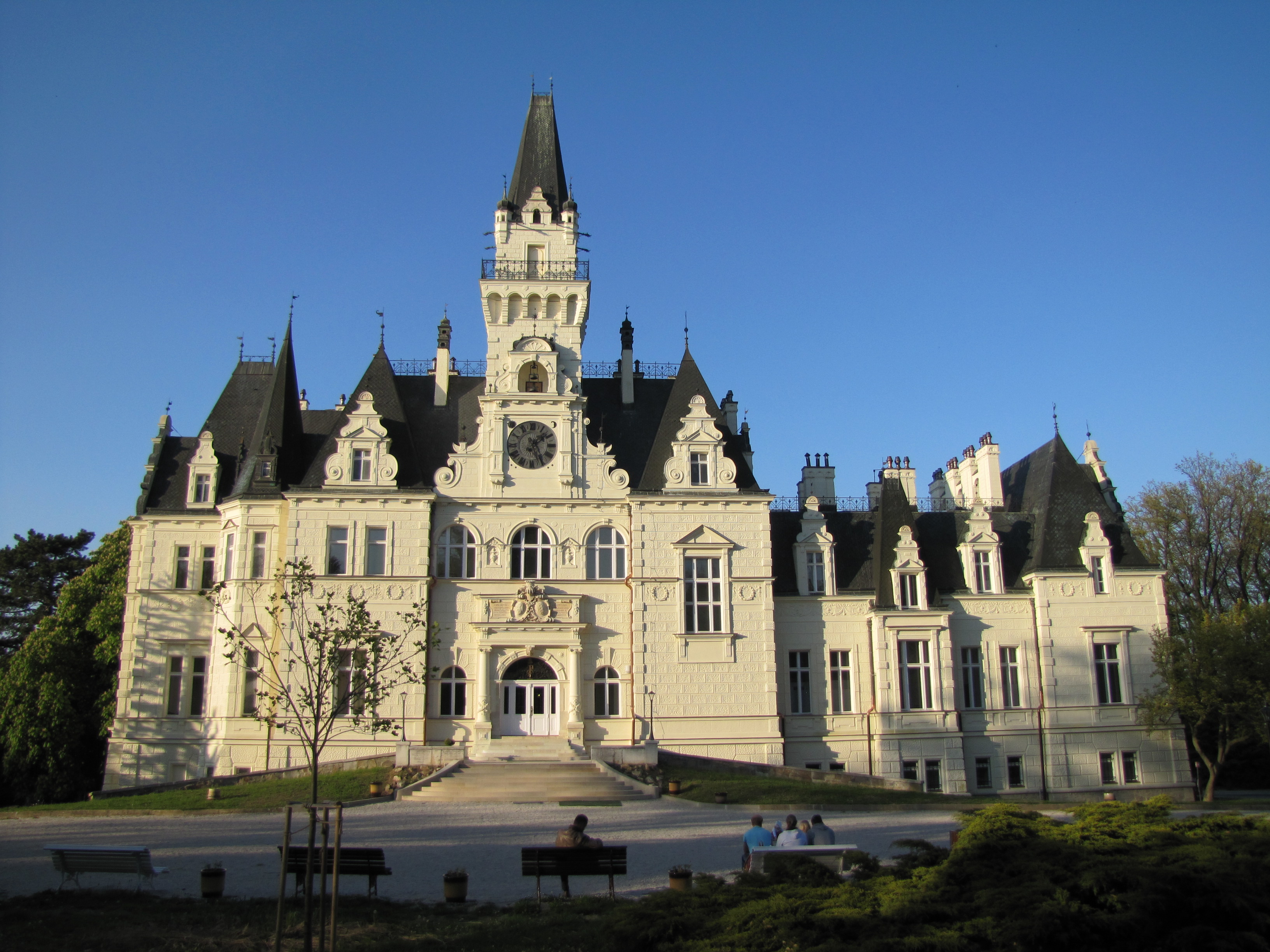
- Manor in Budmerice

- Flag Coat of arms

- Location of Budmerice in the Bratislava Region Location of Budmerice in Slovakia
- Coordinates: 48.37°N 17.42°E
- Country: Slovakia
- Region: Bratislava Region
- District: Pezinok District
- First mentioned: 1300

Area
  - Total: 30.07 km^{2} (11.61 sq mi)
- Elevation: 176 m (577 ft)

Population (2025)
  - Total: 2,497
- Time zone: UTC+1 (CET)
  - Summer (DST): UTC+2 (CEST)
- Postal code: 900 86
- Area code: +421 33
- Vehicle registration plate (until 2022): PK
- Website: www.budmerice.sk

Budmerice (Hungarian: Gidrafa) is a village and municipality in western Slovakia in Pezinok District in the Bratislava region. The municipality is most well known for its 19th century manor house.

== Geography ==
The municipality lies at an altitude of 176 metres (577 ft) and covers an area of 30.07 km^{2} (11.61 sq mi) (2025).

== Names and etymology ==
The name comes from Slavic magnate name BudeměrЪ with Slavic/Slovak suffix -ice. The name was adopted by Germans as Pudmeritz what influenced also later Slovak name Pudmerice. In the 13-14 centuries, the name of Hungarian origin Kerestúr (1296 Keresthwr) had been also used in parallel, but was abandoned in favour of Slovak resp. German form (Pudmeritz, in 1899 renamed to Gidrafa).

== Population ==
Population statistic (10 years)
Year	1995	2005	2015	2025
Count	1882	2124	2373	2497
Difference		+12.85%	+11.72%	+5.22%

Population statistic
Year	2024	2025
Count	2494	2497
Difference		+0.12%

It has a population of 2497 people (31 December 2025).

=== Ethnicity ===
Census 2021 (1+ %)
Ethnicity	Number	Fraction
Slovak	2411	96.2%
Not found out	82	3.27%
Czech	30	1.19%
Total	2506	

In year 2021 was 2506 people by ethnicity 2411 as Slovak, 82 as Not found out, 30 as Czech, 14 as Other, 11 as Rusyn, 8 as Hungarian, 6 as Serbian, 5 as Russian, 3 as Ukrainian, 3 as German, 2 as Moravian, 1 as Jewish, 1 as Irish, 1 as Italian, 1 as Romani, 1 as Romanian and 1 as French.

Note on population: The difference values of population numbers in the table "Population statistic" and in the sections "Ethnicity" & "Religion" is caused by the use of various statistical methods.

=== Religion ===
Census 2021 (1+ %)
Religion	Number	Fraction
Roman Catholic Church	1688	67.36%
None	644	25.7%
Not found out	77	3.07%
Evangelical Church	30	1.2%
Greek Catholic Church	28	1.12%
Total	2506	

In year 2021 was 2506 people by religion 1688 from Roman Catholic Church, 644 from None, 77 from Not found out, 30 from Evangelical Church, 28 from Greek Catholic Church, 9 from Ad hoc movements, 6 from Eastern Orthodox Church, 6 from Christian Congregations in Slovakia, 4 from Jehovah's Witnesses, 4 from Buddhism, 3 from Other, 2 from Calvinist Church, 2 from Church of Jesus Christ of Latter-day Saints, 1 from Jewish community, 1 from Baptists Church and 1 from Apostolic Church.

== See also ==
- List of municipalities and towns in Slovakia
- Budmerice Mansion

== Genealogical resources ==
The records for genealogical research are available at the state archive "Statny Archiv in Bratislava, Slovakia"

- Roman Catholic church records (births/marriages/deaths): 1774-1895 (parish A)
