= Vinosady =

- Municipality
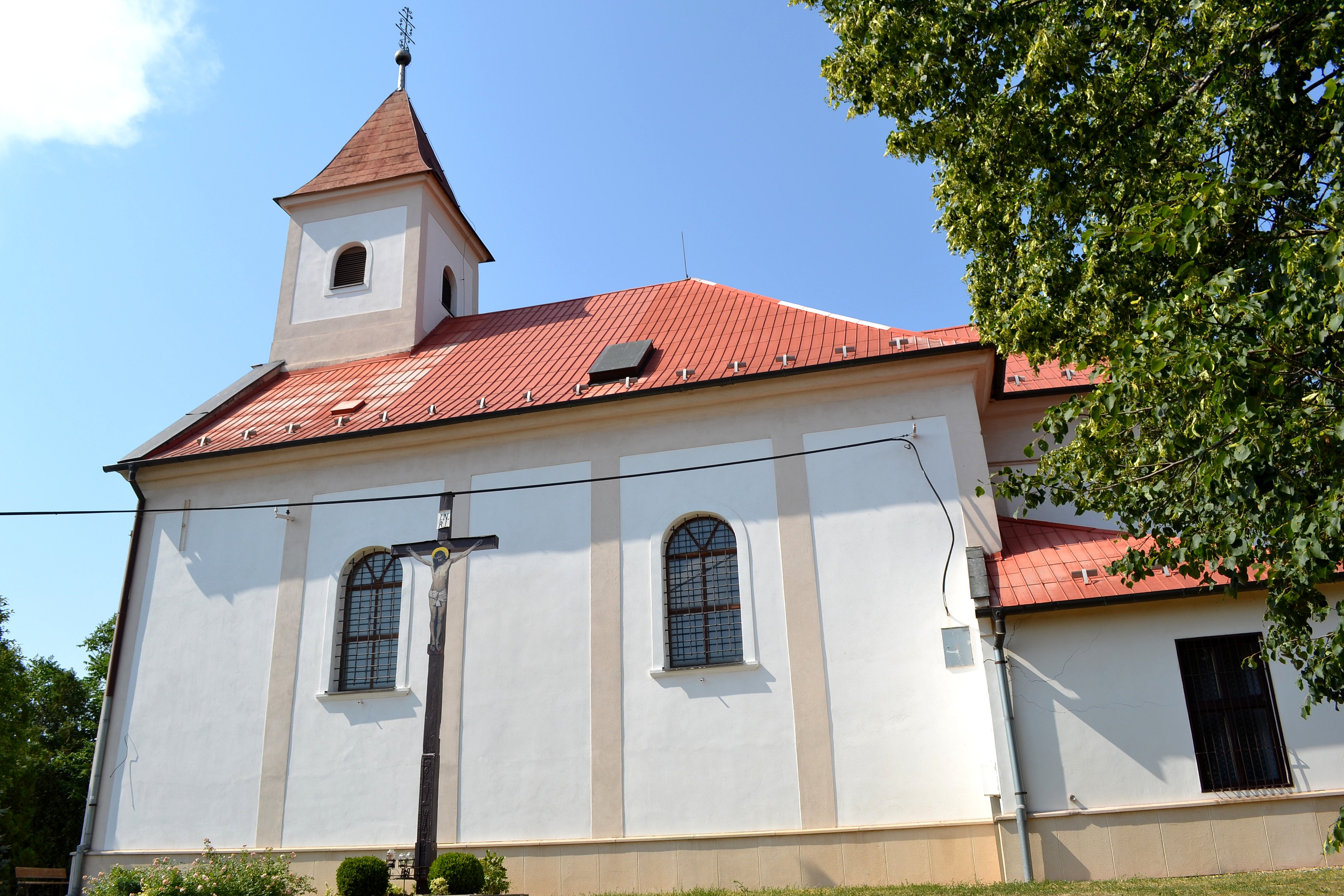
- Church of Saint Martin

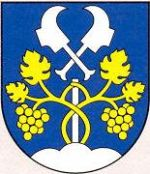
- Flag Coat of arms

- Location of Vinosady in the Bratislava Region Location of Vinosady in Slovakia
- Coordinates: 48.31°N 17.29°E
- Country: Slovakia
- Region: Bratislava Region
- District: Pezinok District
- First mentioned: 1208

Area
  - Total: 5.15 km^{2} (1.99 sq mi)
- Elevation: 155 m (509 ft)

Population (2025)
  - Total: 1,645
- Time zone: UTC+1 (CET)
  - Summer (DST): UTC+2 (CEST)
- Postal code: 902 01
- Area code: +421 33
- Vehicle registration plate (until 2022): PK
- Website: www.vinosady.sk

Vinosady https://telepulesek.adatbank.sk/telepules/vinosady-vinosady/ is a village and municipality in western Slovakia in Pezinok District in the Bratislava Region, on the foothills of the Little Carpathians.

== Names and etymology ==
The current name means Vineyards and refers to rich vineyard tradition in this region.

The former village Kučišdorf was initially known as Turduna, Torduna, Turna or Thurnie, the name comes from Slovak tŕň, trnava (see also etymology of Trnava). Its later name Kučišdorf comes from a personal name probably of Slavic origin Kucar/Kučar adopted to the Hungarian language as Chucar, Csukar (Chukarfalva, Csukárd). The name of the second former village Trlinok also comes from Slovak tŕň. In 1948, villages were renamed: Kučišdorf to Veľké Tŕnie and Trlinok to Malé Tŕnie.

== History ==
In historical records the village, which was made of two independent parts was first mentioned in 1208, although it was inhabited lot sooner, in the 9th century, as the Great Moravian site was discovered near the village.

At the end of the 13th century, two village arose: Trlinka and Kučišdorf, which were closely linked to their bigger towns, Pezinok and Modra. The villages merged in 1964 to one village Vinosady. The merged village got its own coat-of-arms in 1998.

== Geography ==
The municipality lies at an altitude of 155 metres (509 ft) and covers an area of 5.15 km^{2} (1.99 sq mi) (2025). The village is located 26 km from Bratislava and 3 km from Pezinok.

== Population ==
Population statistic (10 years)
Year	1995	2005	2015	2025
Count	832	1091	1311	1645
Difference		+31.12%	+20.16%	+25.47%

Population statistic
Year	2024	2025
Count	1657	1645
Difference		−0.72%

It has a population of 1645 people (31 December 2025).

=== Ethnicity ===
Census 2021 (1+ %)
Ethnicity	Number	Fraction
Slovak	1374	93.27%
Not found out	81	5.49%
Total	1473	

In year 2021 was 1473 people by ethnicity 1374 as Slovak, 81 as Not found out, 14 as Other, 8 as Czech, 6 as Ukrainian, 6 as German, 6 as Hungarian, 3 as Romanian, 3 as Polish, 3 as Canadian, 1 as Vietnamese, 1 as Serbian, 1 as Romani, 1 as Rusyn, 1 as Russian, 1 as Austrian and 1 as Moravian.

Note on population: The difference values of population numbers in the table "Population statistic" and in the sections "Ethnicity" & "Religion" is caused by the use of various statistical methods.

=== Religion ===
Census 2021 (1+ %)
Religion	Number	Fraction
Roman Catholic Church	692	46.98%
None	459	31.16%
Evangelical Church	166	11.27%
Not found out	93	6.31%
Total	1473	

In year 2021 was 1473 people by religion 692 from Roman Catholic Church, 459 from None, 166 from Evangelical Church, 93 from Not found out, 13 from Greek Catholic Church, 9 from Jehovah's Witnesses, 7 from Ad hoc movements, 6 from Eastern Orthodox Church, 6 from Buddhism, 5 from Calvinist Church, 5 from Islam, 5 from Other, 3 from Christian Congregations in Slovakia, 2 from Paganism and natural spirituality, 1 from Church of the Brethren and 1 from Seventh-day Adventist Church.
