= Kaplna =

Kaplna Erzsébetkápolna
- Municipality
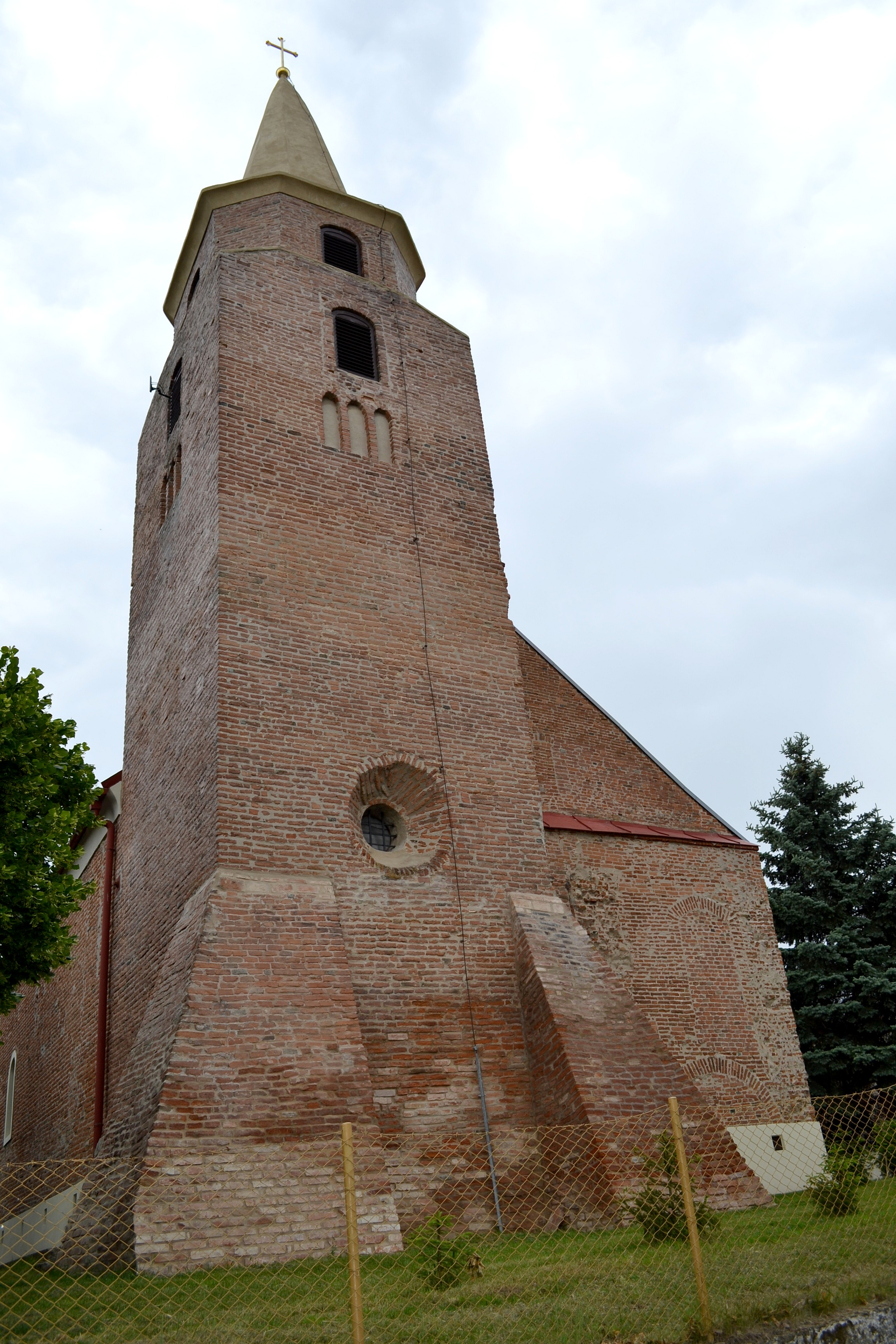
- Romanesque church in village

- Flag Coat of arms

- Location of Kaplna in the Bratislava Region Location of Kaplna in Slovakia
- Coordinates: 48.30°N 17.45°E
- Country: Slovakia
- Region: Bratislava Region
- District: Senec District
- First mentioned: 1244

Area
  - Total: 5.52 km^{2} (2.13 sq mi)
- Elevation: 146 m (479 ft)

Population (2025)
  - Total: 955
- Time zone: UTC+1 (CET)
  - Summer (DST): UTC+2 (CEST)
- Postal code: 900 84
- Area code: +421 33
- Vehicle registration plate (until 2022): SC
- Website: www.kaplna.sk

Kaplna (Hungarian: Erzsébetkápolna) is a village and municipality in western Slovakia in Senec District in the Bratislava Region. It is located about ten kilometres (6.2 miles) north-east of Senec on a road connecting Senec with Trnava.

== Geography ==
The municipality lies at an altitude of 146 metres (479 ft) and covers an area of 5.52 km^{2} (2.13 sq mi) (2025).

== History ==
Archaeological digs show that the area around Kaplna was first settled around 5000 BC. The first written reference to the village comes from a document signed by the Hungarian king Bela IV in 1244 AD as "Capulna".

The name of the village was derived from a unique wo-tower Catholic church built in Romanesque architecture sometimes in the first half of the eleventh century. The church walls were not plastered, showing its bright red bricks. Later, the church was rebuilt in early Gothic style, and after a 1634 fire it has been rebuilt with only one tower. In the eighteenth century the church interior was rebuilt in Baroque style. In 1960, an archaeological dig uncovered the original Romanesque porch and windows.

During the Ottoman invasion the village was abandoned, only to be resettled in the sixteenth century by Croatian colonists. Between 1974 and 1990 the village was a part of Báhoň, after which it attained self-governance.

== Culture and Entertainment ==
Kaplna has a soccer club, which is currently in the middle of the field of Slovakia's sixth division soccer league, Bratislava district. In addition, the mayor is organizing a table tennis tournament each year.

In 2003, Kaplna has founded a folk song festival taking place every September, called Folkovanie v Kaplne. The attendance and number of bands, however, has steadily declined since the first year.

The village also contains a hotel with a restaurant, ice cream shop and Internet cafe.

== Population ==
Population statistic (10 years)
Year	1995	2005	2015	2025
Count	689	717	751	955
Difference		+4.06%	+4.74%	+27.16%

Population statistic
Year	2024	2025
Count	961	955
Difference		−0.62%

It has a population of 955 people (31 December 2025).

=== Ethnicity ===
Census 2021 (1+ %)
Ethnicity	Number	Fraction
Slovak	896	94.91%
Not found out	39	4.13%
Total	944	

In year 2021 was 944 people by ethnicity 896 as Slovak, 39 as Not found out, 8 as Hungarian, 4 as Vietnamese, 3 as Czech, 3 as Other, 2 as Ukrainian, 1 as Polish and 1 as English.

Note on population: The difference values of population numbers in the table "Population statistic" and in the sections "Ethnicity" & "Religion" is caused by the use of various statistical methods.

=== Religion ===
Census 2021 (1+ %)
Religion	Number	Fraction
Roman Catholic Church	672	71.19%
None	183	19.39%
Not found out	38	4.03%
Evangelical Church	14	1.48%
Greek Catholic Church	13	1.38%
Total	944	

In year 2021 was 944 people by religion 672 from Roman Catholic Church, 183 from None, 38 from Not found out, 14 from Evangelical Church, 13 from Greek Catholic Church, 4 from Christian Congregations in Slovakia, 4 from Buddhism, 3 from Other and not ascertained christian church, 3 from Other, 3 from Ad hoc movements, 2 from Eastern Orthodox Church, 2 from Baptists Church, 1 from Calvinist Church, 1 from Paganism and natural spirituality and 1 from United Methodist Church.

According to the 2011 census, the municipality had 701 inhabitants. 687 of inhabitants were Slovaks and 14 others and unspecified.

== See also ==
- List of municipalities and towns in Slovakia

== Genealogical resources ==
The records for genealogical research are available at the state archive "Statny Archiv in Bratislava, Slovakia"

- Roman Catholic church records (births/marriages/deaths): 1703-1903 (parish A)
- Lutheran church records (births/marriages/deaths): 1786-1896 (parish B)
