= Doľany, Pezinok District =

Doľany Ottóvölgy
- Municipality
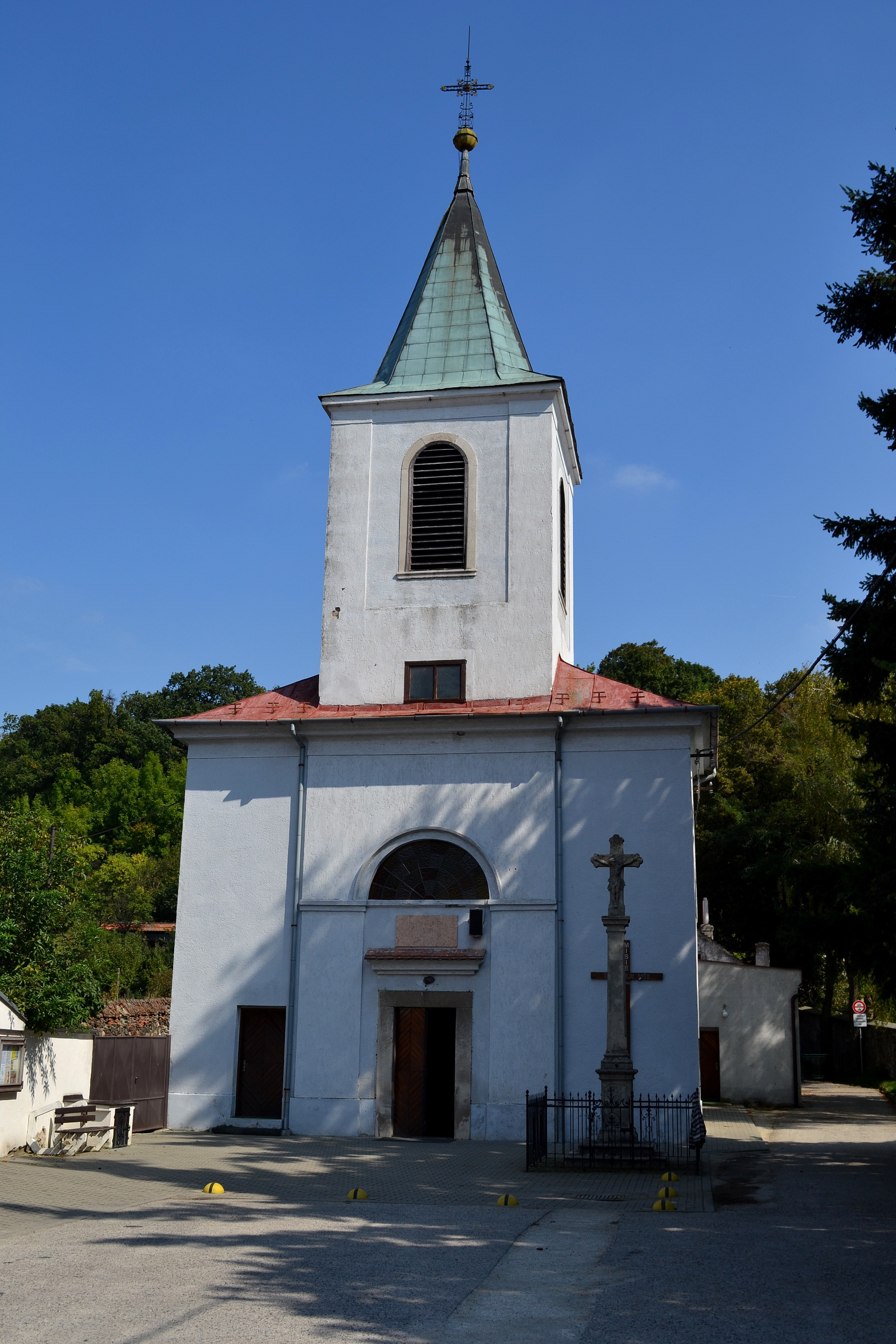
- Church of Saint Catherina

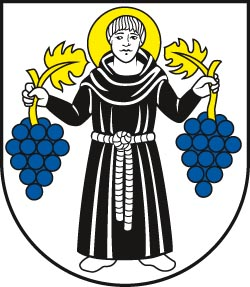
- Flag Coat of arms

- Location of Doľany in the Bratislava Region Location of Doľany in Slovakia
- Coordinates: 48.42°N 17.38°E
- Country: Slovakia
- Region: Bratislava Region
- District: Pezinok District
- First mentioned: 1390

Area
  - Total: 22.54 km^{2} (8.70 sq mi)
- Elevation: 245 m (804 ft)

Population (2025)
  - Total: 1,071
- Time zone: UTC+1 (CET)
  - Summer (DST): UTC+2 (CEST)
- Postal code: 900 88
- Area code: +421 33
- Vehicle registration plate (until 2022): PK
- Website: www.dolany.sk

Doľany (Hungarian: Ottóvölgy, German: Ottent[h]al) is a village and municipality in western Slovakia in Pezinok District in the Bratislava region.

== Geography ==
The municipality lies at an altitude of 245 metres (804 ft) and covers an area of 22.54 km^{2} (8.70 sq mi) (2025).

== Population ==
Population statistic (10 years)
| Year | 1995 | 2005 | 2015 | 2025 |
|---|---|---|---|---|
| Count | 1022 | 1021 | 1076 | 1071 |
| Difference | | −0.09% | +5.38% | −0.46% |

Population statistic
| Year | 2024 | 2025 |
|---|---|---|
| Count | 1070 | 1071 |
| Difference | | +0.09% |

It has a population of 1071 people (31 December 2025).

=== Ethnicity ===
Census 2021 (1+ %)
| Ethnicity | Number | Fraction |
|---|---|---|
| Slovak | 1048 | 98.31% |
| Not found out | 14 | 1.31% |
| Total | 1066 | |

In year 2021 was 1066 people by ethnicity 1048 as Slovak, 14 as Not found out, 8 as Czech, 8 as Other, 5 as Russian, 2 as Romanian, 2 as German, 1 as Italian, 1 as Serbian, 1 as Silesian, 1 as Hungarian and 1 as French.

Note on population: The difference values of population numbers in the table "Population statistic" and in the sections "Ethnicity" & "Religion" is caused by the use of various statistical methods.

=== Religion ===
Census 2021 (1+ %)
| Religion | Number | Fraction |
|---|---|---|
| Roman Catholic Church | 827 | 77.58% |
| None | 201 | 18.86% |
| Not found out | 12 | 1.13% |
| Total | 1066 | |

In year 2021 was 1066 people by religion 827 from Roman Catholic Church, 201 from None, 12 from Not found out, 8 from Evangelical Church, 5 from Ad hoc movements, 4 from Other, 4 from Greek Catholic Church, 2 from Christian Congregations in Slovakia, 1 from Other and not ascertained christian church, 1 from Seventh-day Adventist Church and 1 from Buddhism.

== Genealogical resources ==
The records for genealogical research are available at the state archive "Statny Archiv in Bratislava, Slovakia"

- Roman Catholic church records (births/marriages/deaths): 1638-1927 (parish A)

== See also ==
- List of municipalities and towns in Slovakia
