= Slovak Lines =

Slovak bus operating company

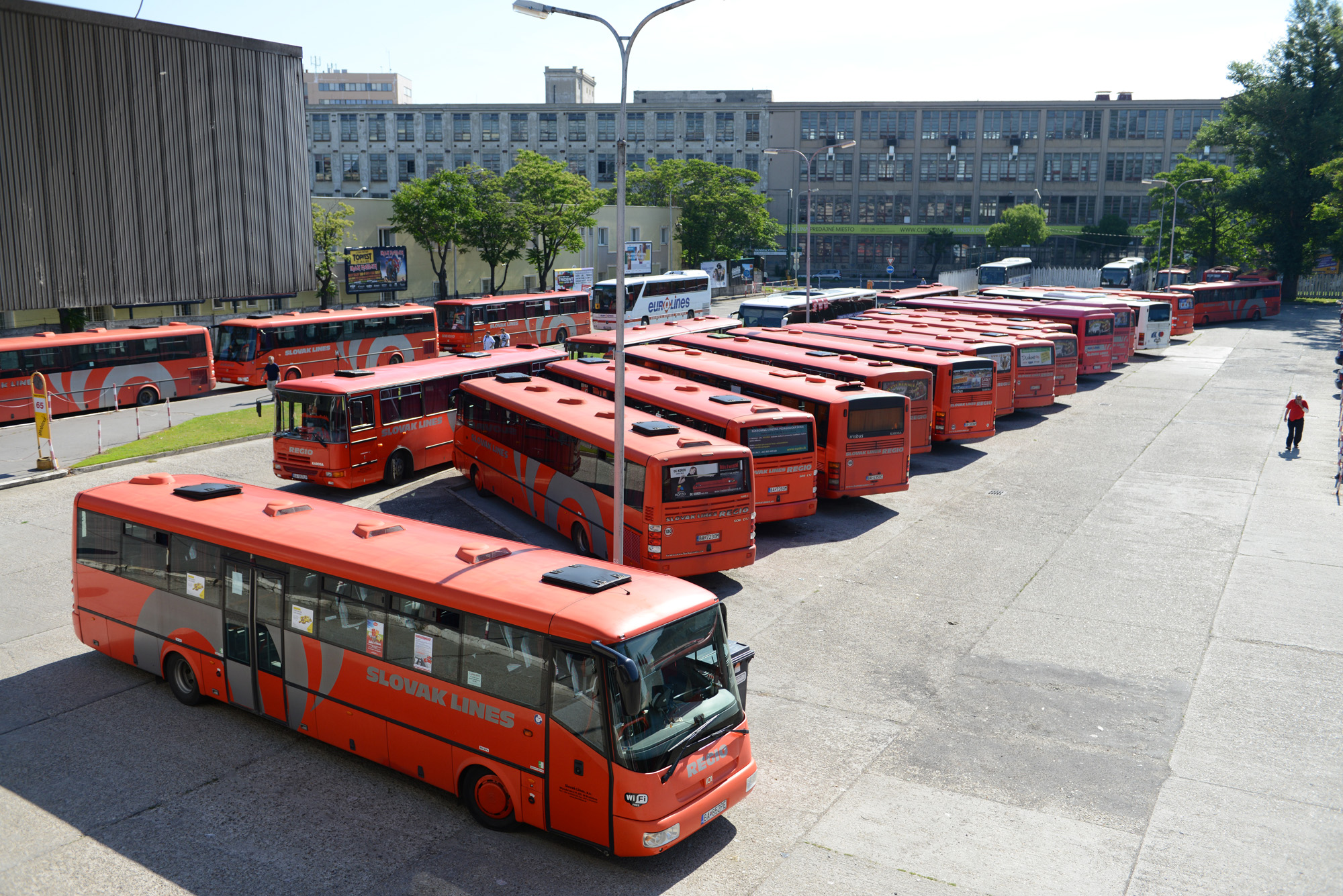
- Slovak Lines buses in Bratislava
- Founded: 2001; 25 years ago, as Slovenská autobusová doprava Bratislava (Slovak Bus Transport Bratislava)
- Website: www.slovaklines.sk/sk/

Slovak Lines a.s. is a Slovak company operating urban, intercity and international bus transport. It was created by renaming the original company SAD Bratislava (Slovenská autobusová doprava), which had previously used this brand. Until 2021, the carrier issued transport cards that could be used within the Integrated Transport System in the Bratislava Region, and is partially involved in the Slovak Transport Passport project. The company was founded in 1949 as part of ČSAD and after the division of Czechoslovakia it operated until 2007 under the name Slovak Bus Transport. The brand name was changed to Slovak Lines in 2007. The company has over three hundred buses since 2013 has also operated low-floor buses in suburban transport. In 2019, the company's registered capital amounted to 28 million euros. The company works together with the Bratislava Airport and Vienna Airport.

== Routes ==
=== Suburban transport ===
- Bratislava – Marianka – Stupava – Borinka
- Bratislava – Stupava – Rohožník
- Bratislava – Bernolákovo – Chorvatský Grob – Slovenský Grob – Viničné – Pezinok
- Bratislava – Rovinka – Dunajská Lužná – Tomášov – Senec
- Bratislava – Bernolákovo – Nová Dedinka
- Bratislava – Ivanka pri Dunaji – Malinovo – Tomášov
- Bratislava – Tomášov – Nový Život – Čenkovce
- Bratislava – Štvrtok na Ostrove – Čakany – Zlaté Klasy
- Bratislava – Miloslavov
- Bratislava – Dunajská Lužná – Šamorín, Čilistov
- Bratislava – Blatná na Ostrove – Gabčíkovo
- Bratislava – Blatná na Ostrove
- Bratislava – Malacky – Gajary
- Bratislava – Malacky – Malé Leváre – Borský Svätý Jur
- Bratislava – Malacky
- Bratislava – Zohor – Suchohrad – Malacky
- Bratislava – Malacky – Studienka – Bílkove Humence
- Bratislava – Pezinok – Zochova chata
- Bratislava – Pezinok – Modra
- Bratislava – Častá – Trnava
- Bratislava – Častá – Budmerice – Cífer
- Bratislava – Trstín – Chtelnica
- Bratislava – Pezinok – Limbach
- Bratislava – Pezinok – Viničné – Senec
- Bratislava – Pezinok – Baka
- Bratislava – Pezinok – Častá – Štefanová
- Bratislava – Senec – Blatné – Igram – Čataj
- Bratislava – Senec – Velké Úľany / Jelka
- Bratislava – Tureň – Senec – Hurbanova Ves
- Bratislava – Senec
- Bratislava – Veľký Biel – Senec
- Malacky – Plavecký Peter
- Malacky – Kuchyně – Pezinok
- Malacky – Láb – Jablonové, Turecký Vrch
- Senec – Šenkvice – Báhoň – Vištuk – Modra
- Senec – Trnava
- Senec – Veľký Grob – Báhoň
- Senec – Kráľová pri Senci – Nový Svět
- Senec – Šamorín
- Senec – Veľký Biel – Tomášov

== See also ==
- List of bus operating companies
