= Yvette Estermann =

Swiss-Slovak politician (born 1967)

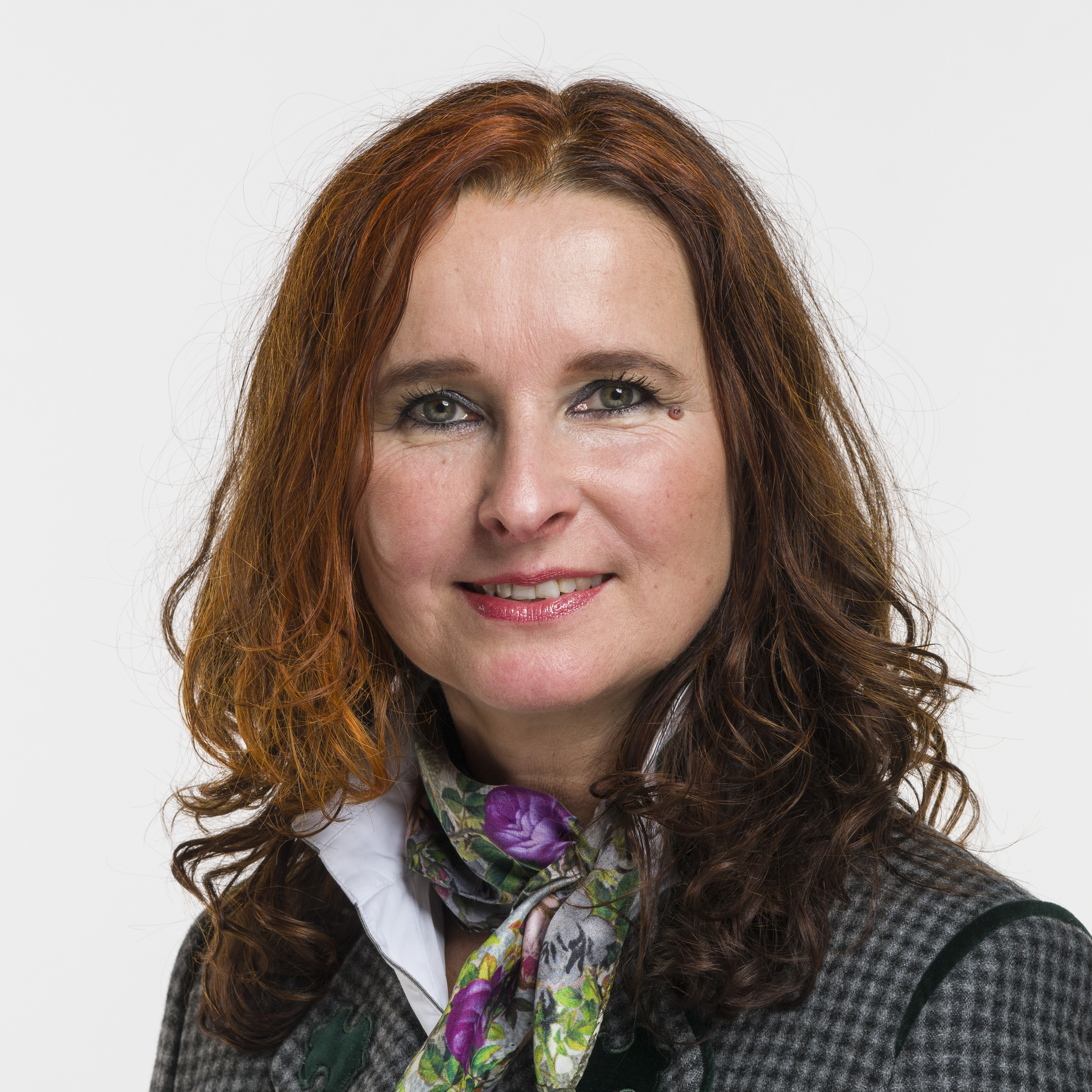
- Official portrait, 2019

Member of the National Council (Switzerland)
- In office 3 December 2007 – 3 December 2023
- Constituency: Canton of Lucerne

Personal details
- Born: Iveta Gavlasová; 26 February 1967 (age 59) Kráľová pri Senci, Senec, Czechoslovakia
- Party: Swiss People's Party
- Children: 1
- Education: Comenius University (PhD); University of Bern (MA) (ongoing)
- Profession: Medical Practitioner (MD, Bratislava)

Military service
- Allegiance: Switzerland
- Branch/service: Swiss Armed Forces
- Years of service: 16 June 2023 – present
- Rank: Captain

Yvette Estermann (née Gavlasová; born 26 February 1967) is a Swiss-Slovak physician and politician who served on the National Council (Switzerland) from 2007 to 2023. During the 2023 Swiss federal election she did not run for re-election and is due to leave her post on 3 December 2023.

== Early life and education ==
Estermann was born in Bratislava, Czechoslovakia (now Slovakia) to Zdeno Gavlas and Alžbeta Gavlasová. Her father was an insurance agent and freelance spiritual healer while her mother was a homemaker.

She studied medicine at the Comenius University, where she obtained her doctorate in 1993. One year later, she emigrated to Switzerland to marry her Swiss partner and pursue studies in homeopathic medicine. After ceasing to practice medicine due to the time demands of her political office, she now works as a life coaching consultant. In 2023, Estermann made public that she is currently enrolled in theology studies at the University of Bern, and is due to graduate in 2027.

== Career ==
After obtaining Swiss citizenship in 1999, Estermann joined the right-wing Swiss People's Party (SVP). In 2005, she was elected to the cantonal parliament, the Grand Council of Lucerne, and in the 2007 national elections, she was elected to the National Council. Despite her foreign origin, Estermann is very vocal against immigration of foreigners into Switzerland

Estermann was member of the board of Cosmos AG, the business which ran the Swiss degree mill "Free University of Teufen". She also did her doctorate at the university, which raised doubts about her doctorate. She's a member of a Campaign for an Independent and Neutral Switzerland.

During the 2023 Swiss federal election, Estermann decided not to run for re-election. On 16 June 2016 she was appointed Captain in the Swiss Armed Forces and will be appointed as minister within the army. She is planning to work as pastor for the reformed church after graduation.

== Family ==
She is married to Richard F. Estermann (b. 1942), an independent consultant with whom she has one son, Richard Estermann, Jr. (b. 1995). She resides in Kriens in the canton of Lucerne, Switzerland.
