= Súr (chieftain) =

10th-century Magyar chieftain and military leader

Súr or Sur (Latin: Sura or Assur; died 15 August 955) was a Hungarian chieftain and military leader in the 10th century. He was one of the generals, alongside Bulcsú and Lehel, who were executed after the Battle of Lechfeld.

== Name and tribal territory ==
Historian György Györffy considered that Súr's name derived from an old Turkic dignity called "čor" in the 7th century, which title was then taken over by the Pechenegs ("čur"). In contrast, Gyula Kristó argued that his name originated from the Slavic equivalent "šurъ" meaning "brother-in-law".

Based on his name Györffy considered that Súr was of Pecheneg origin, who came from a subjugated tribe, which was ordered to settle down along the western border during the Hungarian conquest of the Carpathian Basin protecting and guarding the gyepűelve there. Györffy argued that Súr was progenitor of the gens (clan) Osl, which possessed landholdings in Sopron County in the 13th century, as his name occurs frequently among members of the kindred.

According to Györffy, Súr's tribal territory laid in the westernmost part of Upper Hungary, in the future Pozsony County (present-day mostly Slovakia). His summer residence was located around present-day Svätý Jur (Szentgyörgy) where the nearby Šúr swamp forest and meadows preserved his name. Along the local stream to the river Váh (Vág), a group of villages – Hegysúr (Hrubý Šúr), Pénteksúr (Malý Šúr; present-day a borough of Kostolná pri Dunaji) along with the nearby river island, and present-day Šúrovce (Súr, which was established by merging four villages – Nagysúr, Nemessúr, Valtasúr and Várassúr) preserved the name of the chieftain and the site of his winter residence. Based on settlement names in Veszprém and Somogy counties, Györffy considered that Súr was perhaps a member of the ruling Árpád dynasty and belonged to the close relatives of Grand Prince Fajsz. Gyula Kristó and Ferenc Makk argued that both Lehel and Súr belonged to the inner circle of Bulcsú's federation of tribes in Western Hungary.

== Defeat and execution ==
Súr was one of the leaders of the Hungarian campaign into East Francia in 955, which suffered a disastrous defeat in the Battle of Lechfeld on 10 August 955, ending the further Hungarian invasions into Western Europe. The 16th-century Humanist historian Johannes Aventinus writes that the Hungarian army was led by Bulcsú and his four sub-generals, Csaba, Lehel, Súr and Taksony. Györffy claimed, based on the aforementioned place names, that Lehel and Súr led together the units of the Duchy of Nyitra (Nitra) during the campaign.

Following the defeat, Otto the Great ordered to chase the fleeing Hungarians. The Bohemian auxiliary army commanded by Boleslaus I, Duke of Bohemia clashed with a large fleeing group of the Hungarians in the eastern part of Lechfeld on 11 August, where Lehel and Súr were captured near the fort of Ebersberg in Bavaria. The local lord Eberhard I, Count of Ebersberg delivered the prisoners to the court of Henry I, Duke of Bavaria in Regensburg, where they, together with Bulcsú, were hanged on 15 August 955. The Ebersberg Chronicle refers to Lehel as "dux" and Súr as "rex". Györffy argued that this distinction may cover an age difference, thus Súr was much older than Lehel (Árpád's great-grandson). The 12th-century Vita s. Heinrici II imperatoris refers to Súr as "Assur".

== Sources ==
- Györffy, György (1970). "A honfoglaló magyarok települési rendjéről [On the Settlement System of the Conquering Hungarians]". Archaeologiai Értesítő (in Hungarian). 97 (2). Magyar Régészeti és Művészettörténeti Társulat: 191–242. ISSN 0003-8032.
- Kordé, Zoltán (1994). "Súr". In Kristó, Gyula; Engel, Pál; Makk, Ferenc (eds.). Korai magyar történeti lexikon (9-14. század) [Encyclopedia of the Early Hungarian History (9th-14th centuries)] (in Hungarian). Akadémiai Kiadó. pp. 611–612. ISBN 963-05-6722-9.
- Kristó, Gyula (1985). Az augsburgi csata [The Battle of Augsburg] (in Hungarian). Akadémiai Kiadó. ISBN 963-05-3838-5.
- Tóth, Sándor László (2015). A magyar törzsszövetség politikai életrajza [A Political Biography of the Hungarian Tribal Federation] (in Hungarian). Belvedere Meridionale. ISBN 978-615-5372-39-1.
