= Tomášov manor house =

Kaštieľ v Tomášove
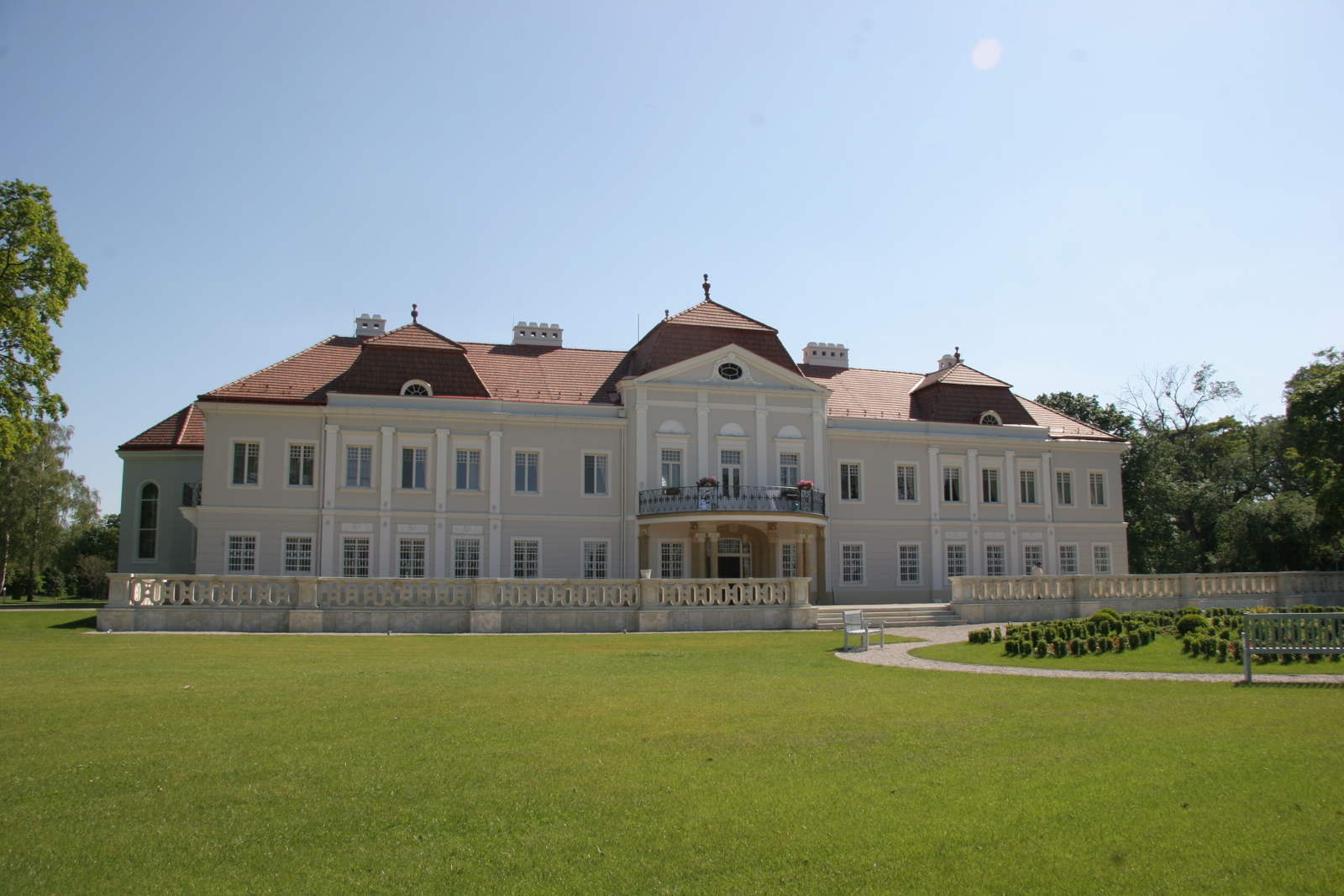

- Location of Tomášov manor house in the Bratislava Region Tomášov manor house (Slovakia)

General information
- Location: Senec, Bratislavský kraj, Slovakia
- Coordinates: 48°08′17″N 17°19′22″E
- Opened: 1766—1769

Website
- www.hotelkastiel.sk

Manor house in Tomášov (Slovak: Kaštieľ v Tomášove) is baroque manor house near village Tomášov, in the Bratislava Region. The manor house is enlisted in Cultural Heritage Monuments of Slovakia.

== History ==
Tomášov manor house was built as a country aristocratic seat by Baron Ján Jesenák in the years 1766–1769 in the style of Classicized Austrian baroque on his own long-before purchased estate.

He built the three-winged manor house with a genuine courtyard on the edge of the village of Fél, today Tomášovo, on an eminence named Majorháza – Estate, rising from amidst fertile lowlands and surrounded by meadow forest and the meandering river bed of the Little Danube. The vast English landscape garden, which originated from the meadow forest and still surrounds it today, became a component of the estate.

In subsequent years the manor passed into the ownership of the aristocratic Dražkovič, Vay and Strasser families, who had the castle building renovated. At the turn of the 20th century, on the impulse of Klementína Vay, a chapel was added on to the eastern wing of the manor. This was later renovated during other adaptations of the manor and re-consecrated to the Guardian Angel.

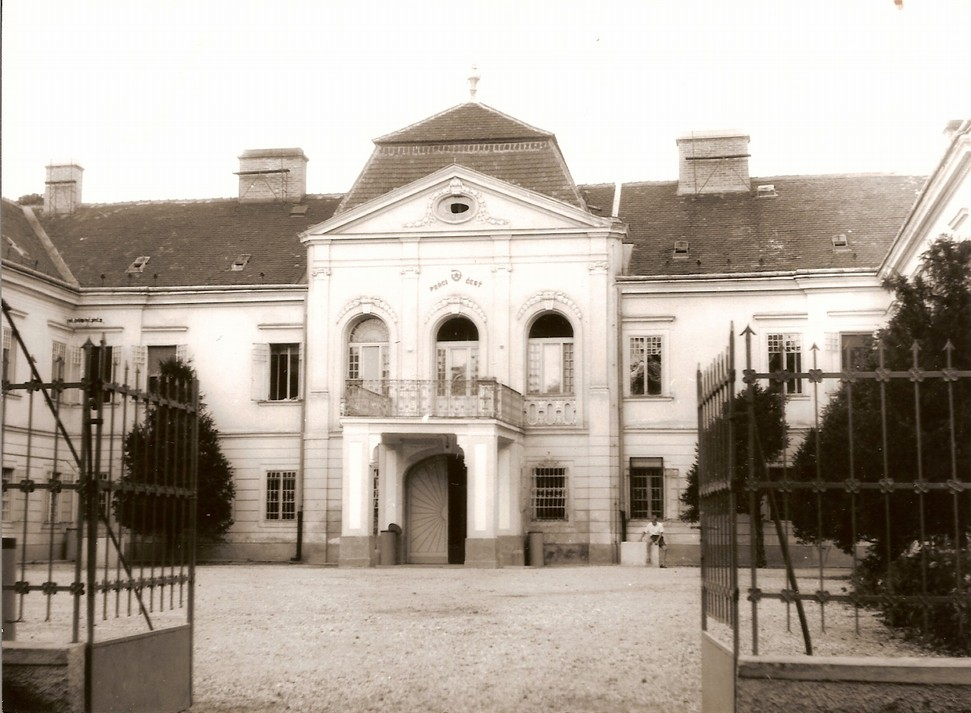
Courtyard of the manor house in 1950s

In 1908 the owner of the Tomášovo estate and the manor house passed to the Strasser family, who at the time of the World War I established a military hospital in the manor. After the end of the war the manor house burned. Luckily, the renewal of this long-time seat of the aristocracy did not disturb its baroque appearance. On the contrary, it showed respect for the style and even enhanced it. Alterations most significantly affected the interior, which was tinged with the art deco style that is still preserved in the arts and crafts furnishings of the manor.

After being nationalized in 1948 the manor came into ownership of the state and was used as a social home for children. A corrections-educational institute for inadaptable youth was organized here. The manor was adapted for a new use which did not respect its historical development and interior disposition. The ground floor side wings were purposefully built up by one floor, due to the need for preparing classrooms and dormitory rooms.

In 1991 the manor was, in line with the new law on restitution, returned to its original owner, the Strasser family. Then in 2005 they sold it to the new owner, who adapted the dilapidated historical building into a high standard hotel, which was opened to the public in 2011 under the name Art Hotel Kastieľ.
