= Boldog =

Boldog may refer to:

== Places ==
- Boldog, Hungary, Hungarian municipality
- Boldog, Slovakia, Slovakian village
- Delüün Boldog, birthplace of Genghis Khan

== People ==
- István Boldog, Hungarian politician
