= Vok =

Vok or Vök may refer to:

- Vök, an Icelandic indie electro band.
- Vok, a race of fictional aliens from the Transformers universe, see List of Beast Wars and Beast Machines characters#Non-aligned characters
- Vok Beverages, Australian drinks manufacturer
- Vök, an Icelandic term for Polynya
- Vlky (in Hungarian Vök), a village and municipality in Senec District in the Bratislava Region, in western Slovakia

VOK may refer to:

- Voice of Kenya, now known as the Kenya Broadcasting Corporation
- Voice of Korea, DPRK radio program
- Volk Field Air National Guard Base (IATA code)
