= Hrubá Borša =

Hrubá Borša Nagyborsa
- Municipality
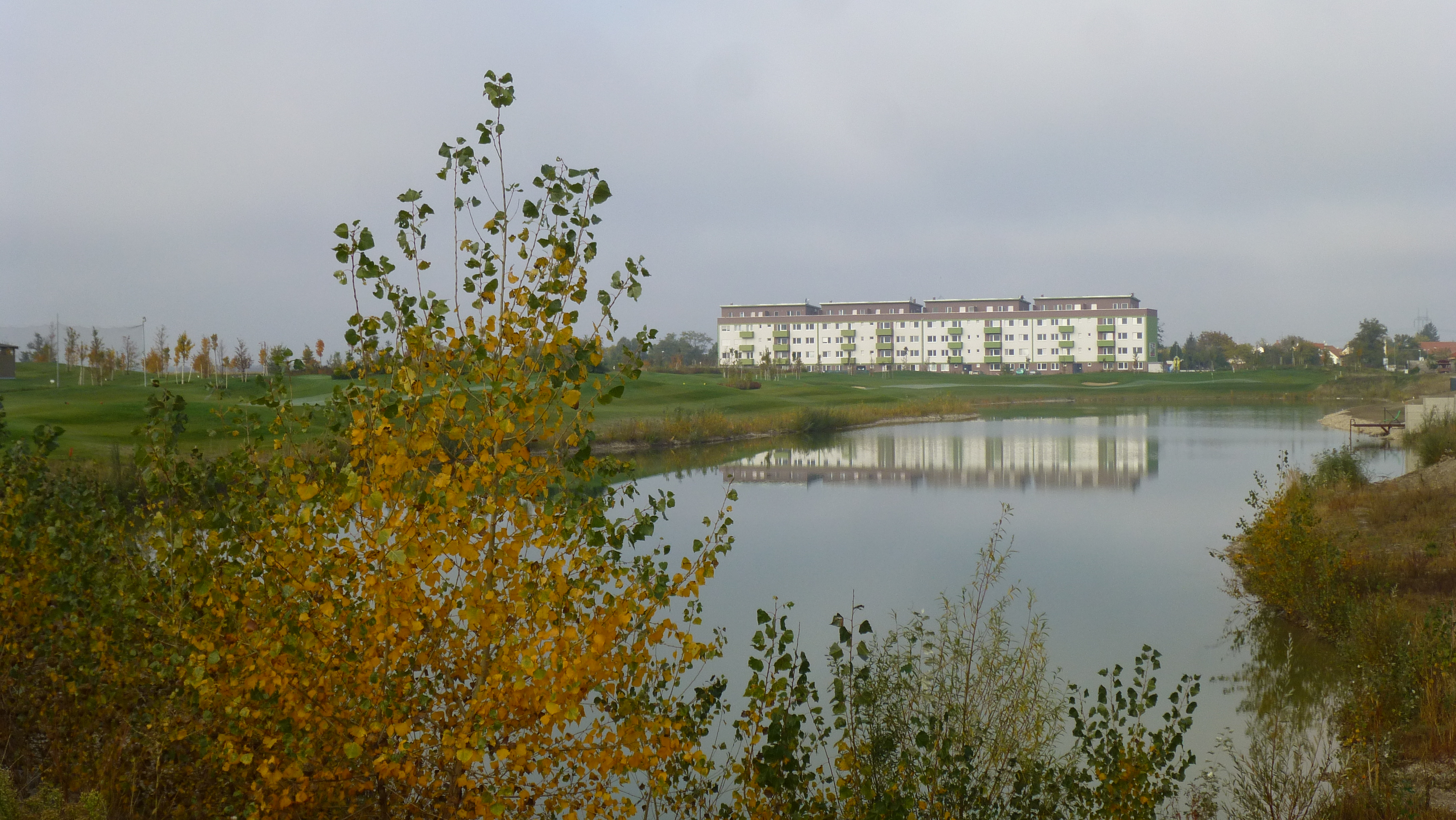

- Flag

- Location of Hrubá Borša in the Bratislava Region Location of Hrubá Borša in Slovakia
- Coordinates: 48.18°N 17.48°E
- Country: Slovakia
- Region: Bratislava Region
- District: Senec District
- First mentioned: 1244

Area
  - Total: 5.84 km^{2} (2.25 sq mi)
- Elevation: 123 m (404 ft)

Population (2025)
  - Total: 1,792
- Time zone: UTC+1 (CET)
  - Summer (DST): UTC+2 (CEST)
- Postal code: 925 25
- Area code: +421 5
- Vehicle registration plate (until 2022): SC
- Website: www.hrubaborsa.eu

Hrubá Borša or Nagyborsa (in Slovak: Hrubá Borša, in Hungarian: Nagyborsa) is a village and municipality in western Slovakia in Senec District in the Bratislava Region.

== History ==
In historical records the village was first mentioned in 1244.

== Geography ==
The municipality lies at an altitude of 123 metres (404 ft) and covers an area of 5.84 km^{2} (2.25 sq mi) (2025).

== Population ==
Population statistic (10 years)
Year	1995	2005	2015	2025
Count	340	393	709	1792
Difference		+15.58%	+80.40%	+152.75%

Population statistic
Year	2024	2025
Count	1739	1792
Difference		+3.04%

It has a population of 1792 people (31 December 2025).

=== Ethnicity ===
Census 2021 (1+ %)
Ethnicity	Number	Fraction
Slovak	1150	86.92%
Hungarian	137	10.35%
Not found out	37	2.79%
Czech	19	1.43%
Total	1323	

In year 2021 was 1323 people by ethnicity 1150 as Slovak, 137 as Hungarian, 37 as Not found out, 19 as Czech, 11 as Other, 6 as Russian, 5 as Italian, 4 as Rusyn, 3 as Serbian, 3 as German, 1 as Ukrainian, 1 as Romani, 1 as Romanian, 1 as Austrian, 1 as Moravian, 1 as Canadian, 1 as French and 1 as Croatian.

Note on population: The difference values of population numbers in the table "Population statistic" and in the sections "Ethnicity" & "Religion" is caused by the use of various statistical methods.

=== Religion ===
Census 2021 (1+ %)
Religion	Number	Fraction
Roman Catholic Church	706	53.36%
None	468	35.37%
Evangelical Church	49	3.7%
Not found out	35	2.65%
Greek Catholic Church	16	1.21%
Total	1323	

In year 2021 was 1323 people by religion 706 from Roman Catholic Church, 468 from None, 49 from Evangelical Church, 35 from Not found out, 16 from Greek Catholic Church, 8 from Other, 7 from Calvinist Church, 7 from Eastern Orthodox Church, 6 from Ad hoc movements, 5 from United Methodist Church, 4 from Jehovah's Witnesses, 4 from Seventh-day Adventist Church, 3 from Christian Congregations in Slovakia, 2 from Buddhism, 1 from Paganism and natural spirituality, 1 from Church of Jesus Christ of Latter-day Saints and 1 from Apostolic Church.

== Genealogical resources ==
The records for genealogical research are available at the state archive "Statny Archiv in Bratislava, Banska Bystrica, Bytca, Kosice, Levoca, Nitra, Presov, Slovakia"

- Roman Catholic church records (births/marriages/deaths): 1711-1898 (parish B)
- Lutheran church records (births/marriages/deaths): 1786-1896 (parish B)
- Reformated church records (births/marriages/deaths): 1889-1910 (parish B)

== See also ==
- List of municipalities and towns in Slovakia
