= Most pri Bratislave =

Most pri Bratislave Dunahidas
- Municipality
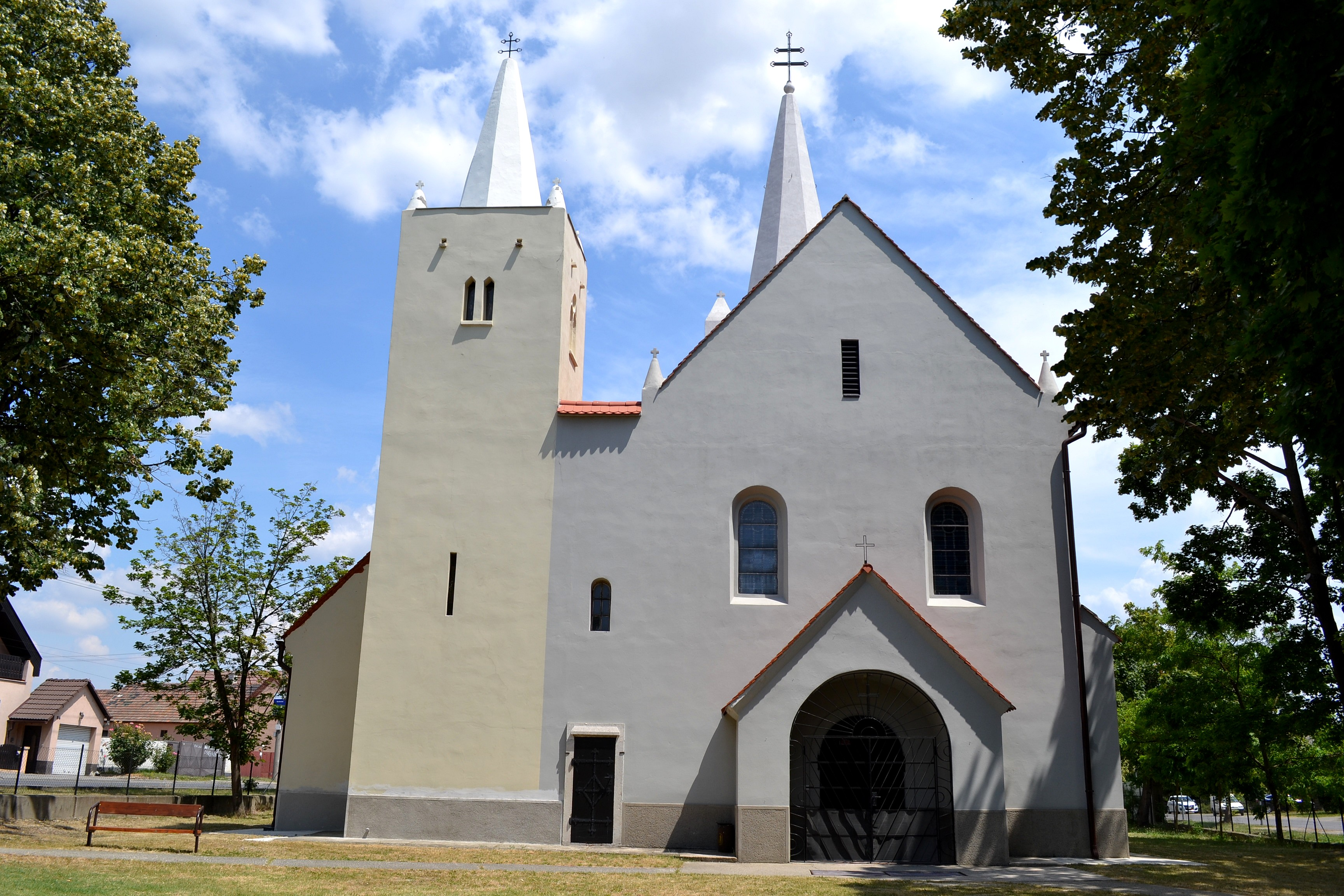
- Church of the Sacred Heart

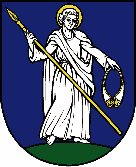
- Flag Coat of arms

- Location of Most pri Bratislave in the Bratislava Region Location of Most pri Bratislave in Slovakia
- Coordinates: 48.14°N 17.27°E
- Country: Slovakia
- Region: Bratislava Region
- District: Senec District
- First mentioned: 1283

Area
  - Total: 19.01 km^{2} (7.34 sq mi)
- Elevation: 130 m (430 ft)

Population (2025)
  - Total: 4,608
- Time zone: UTC+1 (CET)
  - Summer (DST): UTC+2 (CEST)
- Postal code: 900 46
- Area code: +421 18
- Vehicle registration plate (until 2022): SC
- Website: www.mostpribratislave.sk

Most pri Bratislave (Hungarian: Dunahidas, German: Bruck) is a village and municipality in western Slovakia in Senec District in the Bratislava Region.

== History ==
In historical records the village was first mentioned with the German name Pruck in 1238. The village once belonged to the German language area but the majority of the German population was expelled at the end of World War II.

== Geography ==
The municipality lies at an altitude of 130 metres (430 ft) and covers an area of 19.01 km^{2} (7.34 sq mi) (2025).

== Population ==
Population statistic (10 years)
Year	1995	2005	2015	2025
Count	1509	1620	2780	4608
Difference		+7.35%	+71.60%	+65.75%

Population statistic
Year	2024	2025
Count	4533	4608
Difference		+1.65%

It has a population of 4608 people (31 December 2025).

=== Ethnicity ===
Census 2021 (1+ %)
Ethnicity	Number	Fraction
Slovak	3446	88.06%
Not found out	318	8.12%
Hungarian	91	2.32%
Czech	47	1.2%
Total	3913	

In year 2021 was 3913 people by ethnicity 3446 as Slovak, 318 as Not found out, 91 as Hungarian, 47 as Czech, 33 as Rusyn, 29 as Other, 23 as Ukrainian, 8 as Russian, 6 as German, 5 as Italian, 5 as Romani, 5 as Greek, 4 as Austrian, 4 as French, 3 as Chinese, 3 as Serbian, 3 as Polish, 3 as Moravian, 2 as Croatian, 2 as Bulgarian, 1 as Turkish, 1 as Romanian and 1 as Albanian.

Note on population: The difference values of population numbers in the table "Population statistic" and in the sections "Ethnicity" & "Religion" is caused by the use of various statistical methods.

=== Religion ===
Census 2021 (1+ %)
Religion	Number	Fraction
Roman Catholic Church	1710	43.7%
None	1552	39.66%
Not found out	318	8.13%
Evangelical Church	125	3.19%
Greek Catholic Church	76	1.94%
Total	3913	

In year 2021 was 3913 people by religion 1710 from Roman Catholic Church, 1552 from None, 318 from Not found out, 125 from Evangelical Church, 76 from Greek Catholic Church, 32 from Eastern Orthodox Church, 20 from Ad hoc movements, 17 from Other and not ascertained christian church, 14 from Christian Congregations in Slovakia, 9 from Islam, 9 from Other, 5 from Seventh-day Adventist Church, 4 from Church of the Brethren, 4 from Buddhism, 3 from Jewish community, 3 from Jehovah's Witnesses, 3 from United Methodist Church, 2 from Calvinist Church, 2 from Church of Jesus Christ of Latter-day Saints, 2 from Apostolic Church, 1 from Paganism and natural spirituality, 1 from Hinduism and 1 from Czechoslovak Hussite Church.

According to the 2011 census, the municipality had 2,144 inhabitants. 1,883 of inhabitants were Slovaks, 41 Hungarians, 20 Czechs and 200 others and unspecified.

According to the 2021 census, the population has increased to 3,913, 87% of whom were Slovaks and 2% Hungarians.

== External links/Sources ==
Media related to Most pri Bratislave at Wikimedia Commons

- Official website
- "Slovak Republic". Archived from the original on 2007-05-13.
