= Hamuliakovo =

Hamuliakovo Gutor
- Municipality
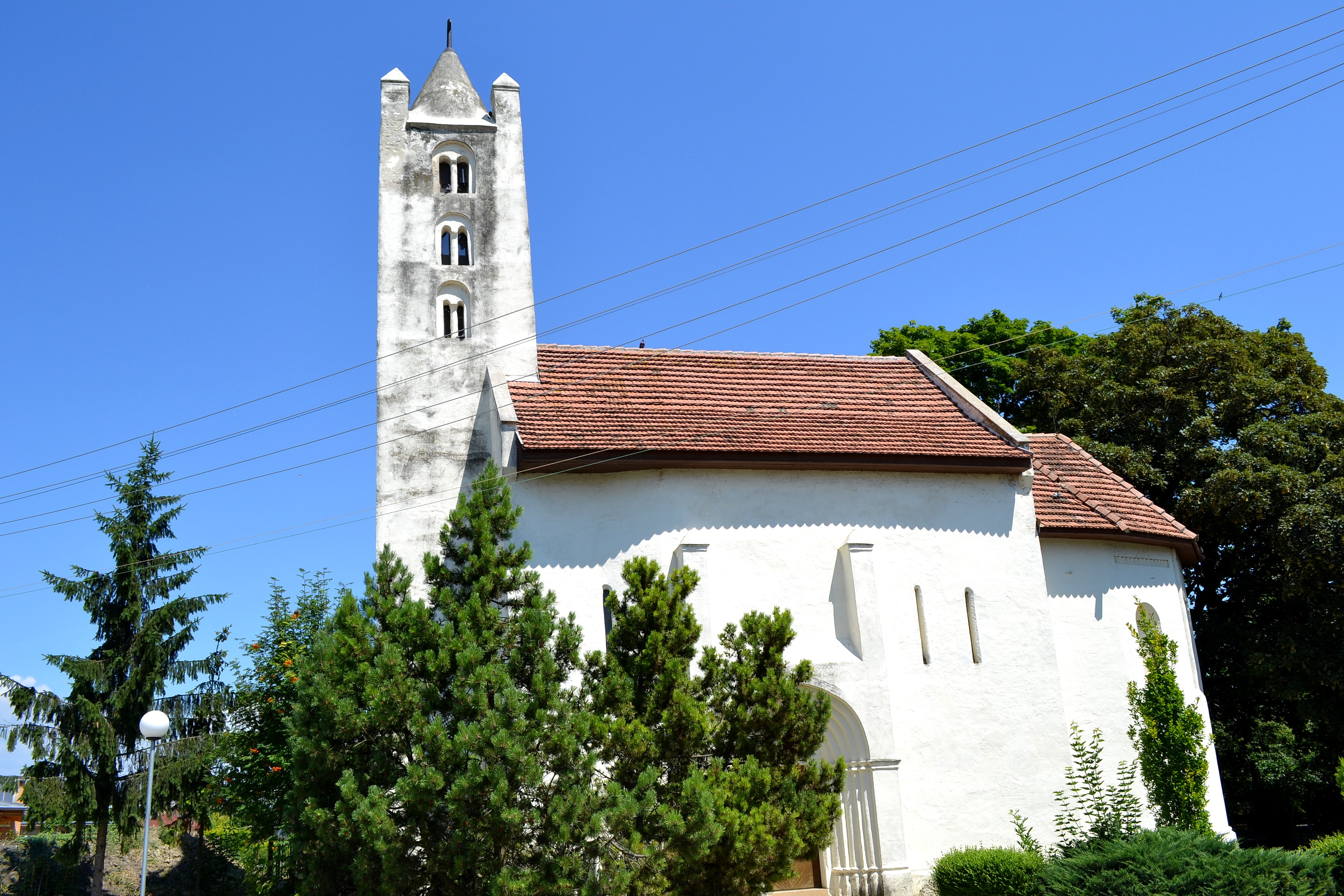
- Church of Holy Cross

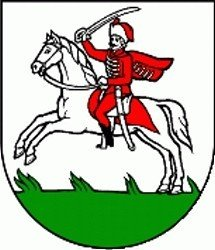
- Flag Coat of arms

- Location of Hamuliakovo in the Bratislava Region Location of Hamuliakovo in Slovakia
- Coordinates: 48.04°N 17.25°E
- Country: Slovakia
- Region: Bratislava Region
- District: Senec District
- First mentioned: 1284

Government
  - Mayor: Jozef Schnóbl

Area
  - Total: 10.94 km^{2} (4.22 sq mi)
- Elevation: 128 m (420 ft)

Population (2025)
  - Total: 3,080
- Time zone: UTC+1 (CET)
  - Summer (DST): UTC+2 (CEST)
- Postal code: 900 43
- Area code: +421 12
- Vehicle registration plate (until 2022): SC
- Website: www.obechamuliakovo.sk

Hamuliakovo (Hungarian: Gutor) is a village and municipality located in the Senec District, Bratislava Region, Slovakia.

== Geography ==
The municipality lies at an altitude of 128 metres (420 ft) and covers an area of 10.94 km^{2} (4.22 sq mi) (2025).

== History ==
In historical records, the village was first mentioned in 1284. After the Austro-Hungarian army disintegrated in November 1918, Czechoslovak troops occupied the area, later acknowledged internationally by the Treaty of Trianon. Between 1938 and 1945, Hamuliakovo once more became part of Miklós Horthy's Hungary through the First Vienna Award. From 1945 until the Velvet Divorce in 1993, it was part of Czechoslovakia. Since then, it has been part of Slovakia.

== Population ==
Population statistic (10 years)
Year	1995	2005	2015	2025
Count	787	1148	1803	3080
Difference		+45.87%	+57.05%	+70.82%

Population statistic
Year	2024	2025
Count	3036	3080
Difference		+1.44%

It has a population of 3080 people (31 December 2025).

=== Ethnicity ===
Census 2021 (1+ %)
Ethnicity	Number	Fraction
Slovak	1959	76.28%
Hungarian	573	22.31%
Not found out	64	2.49%
Other	30	1.16%
Czech	29	1.12%
Total	2568	

In year 2021 was 2568 people by ethnicity 1959 as Slovak, 573 as Hungarian, 64 as Not found out, 30 as Other, 29 as Czech, 10 as Russian, 7 as Rusyn, 7 as German, 6 as Ukrainian, 6 as Romani, 5 as Bulgarian, 2 as Austrian, 2 as Greek, 2 as English, 1 as Vietnamese, 1 as Serbian, 1 as Romanian and 1 as Albanian.

Note on population: The difference values of population numbers in the table "Population statistic" and in the sections "Ethnicity" & "Religion" is caused by the use of various statistical methods.

=== Religion ===
Census 2021 (1+ %)
Religion	Number	Fraction
Roman Catholic Church	1346	52.41%
None	973	37.89%
Evangelical Church	83	3.23%
Not found out	51	1.99%
Total	2568	

In year 2021 was 2568 people by religion 1346 from Roman Catholic Church, 973 from None, 83 from Evangelical Church, 51 from Not found out, 23 from Greek Catholic Church, 15 from Calvinist Church, 15 from Eastern Orthodox Church, 15 from Christian Congregations in Slovakia, 14 from Ad hoc movements, 8 from Other and not ascertained christian church, 7 from Other, 7 from Buddhism, 4 from Islam, 3 from Old Catholic Church, 1 from Jehovah's Witnesses, 1 from Hinduism, 1 from United Methodist Church and 1 from Baptists Church.

== Twin towns ==
Hamuliakovo is twinned with:

- Deutsch Jahrndorf, Austria
- Kerekegyháza, Hungary
- Rajka, Hungary

== See also ==
- List of municipalities and towns in Slovakia

== Genealogical resources ==
The records for genealogical research are available at the state archive "Státný archiv in Bratislava, Slovakia"

- Roman Catholic church records (births/marriages/deaths): 1672-1896 (parish B)
