= Zálesie, Senec District =

Zálesie Tőkésisziget
- Municipality
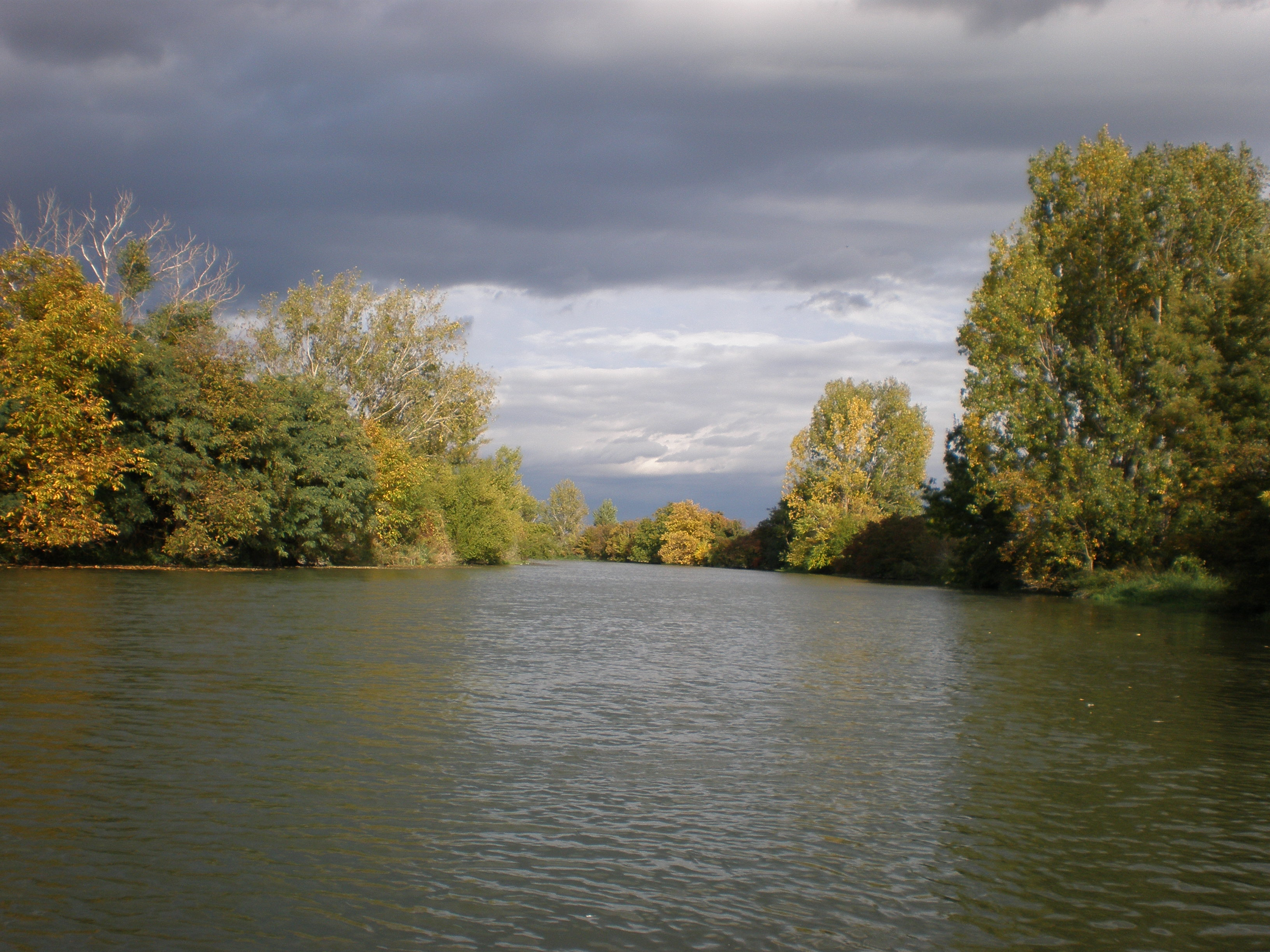

- Flag

- Location of Zálesie in the Bratislava Region Location of Zálesie in Slovakia
- Coordinates: 48.17°N 17.28°E
- Country: Slovakia
- Region: Bratislava Region
- District: Senec District
- First mentioned: 1940

Area
  - Total: 5.86 km^{2} (2.26 sq mi)
- Elevation: 130 m (430 ft)

Population (2025)
  - Total: 2,297
- Time zone: UTC+1 (CET)
  - Summer (DST): UTC+2 (CEST)
- Postal code: 900 28
- Area code: +421 27
- Vehicle registration plate (until 2022): SC
- Website: www.obeczalesie.sk

Zálesie (Hungarian: Tőkésisziget) is a village and municipality in western Slovakia in Senec District in the Bratislava Region.

== History ==
In historical records the village was first mentioned in 1260.

== Geography ==
The municipality lies at an altitude of 130 metres (430 ft) and covers an area of 5.86 km^{2} (2.26 sq mi) (2025).

== Population ==
Population statistic (10 years)
Year	1995	2005	2015	2025
Count	701	999	1875	2297
Difference		+42.51%	+87.68%	+22.50%

Population statistic
Year	2024	2025
Count	2297	2297
Difference		+0%

It has a population of 2297 people (31 December 2025).

=== Ethnicity ===
Census 2021 (1+ %)
Ethnicity	Number	Fraction
Slovak	2105	94.47%
Not found out	73	3.27%
Hungarian	32	1.43%
Total	2228	

In year 2021 was 2228 people by ethnicity 2105 as Slovak, 73 as Not found out, 32 as Hungarian, 21 as Czech, 15 as Rusyn, 15 as Other, 9 as Italian, 5 as Russian, 4 as Ukrainian, 3 as German, 2 as Moravian, 1 as Romanian, 1 as Polish, 1 as Korean, 1 as Canadian and 1 as Bulgarian.

Note on population: The difference values of population numbers in the table "Population statistic" and in the sections "Ethnicity" & "Religion" is caused by the use of various statistical methods.

=== Religion ===
Census 2021 (1+ %)
Religion	Number	Fraction
Roman Catholic Church	1008	45.24%
None	941	42.24%
Evangelical Church	107	4.8%
Not found out	85	3.82%
Total	2228	

In year 2021 was 2228 people by religion 1008 from Roman Catholic Church, 941 from None, 107 from Evangelical Church, 85 from Not found out, 17 from Eastern Orthodox Church, 17 from Greek Catholic Church, 13 from Other, 5 from Calvinist Church, 5 from Paganism and natural spirituality, 5 from Buddhism, 4 from Jewish community, 4 from Apostolic Church, 4 from Ad hoc movements, 3 from Other and not ascertained christian church, 3 from Seventh-day Adventist Church, 2 from Jehovah's Witnesses, 2 from Church of the Brethren, 1 from Old Catholic Church, 1 from Christian Congregations in Slovakia and 1 from Czechoslovak Hussite Church.

According to the 2015 census, the municipality had 1,898 inhabitants. 1,429 of inhabitants were Slovaks, 16 Hungarians, 12 Czechs and 58 others and unspecified.

== External links/Sources ==
Media related to Zálesie, Senec District at Wikimedia Commons

- Official page
- Statistical Office of the Slovak Republic
