= Hrubý Šúr =

Hrubý Šúr Hegysúr
- Municipality
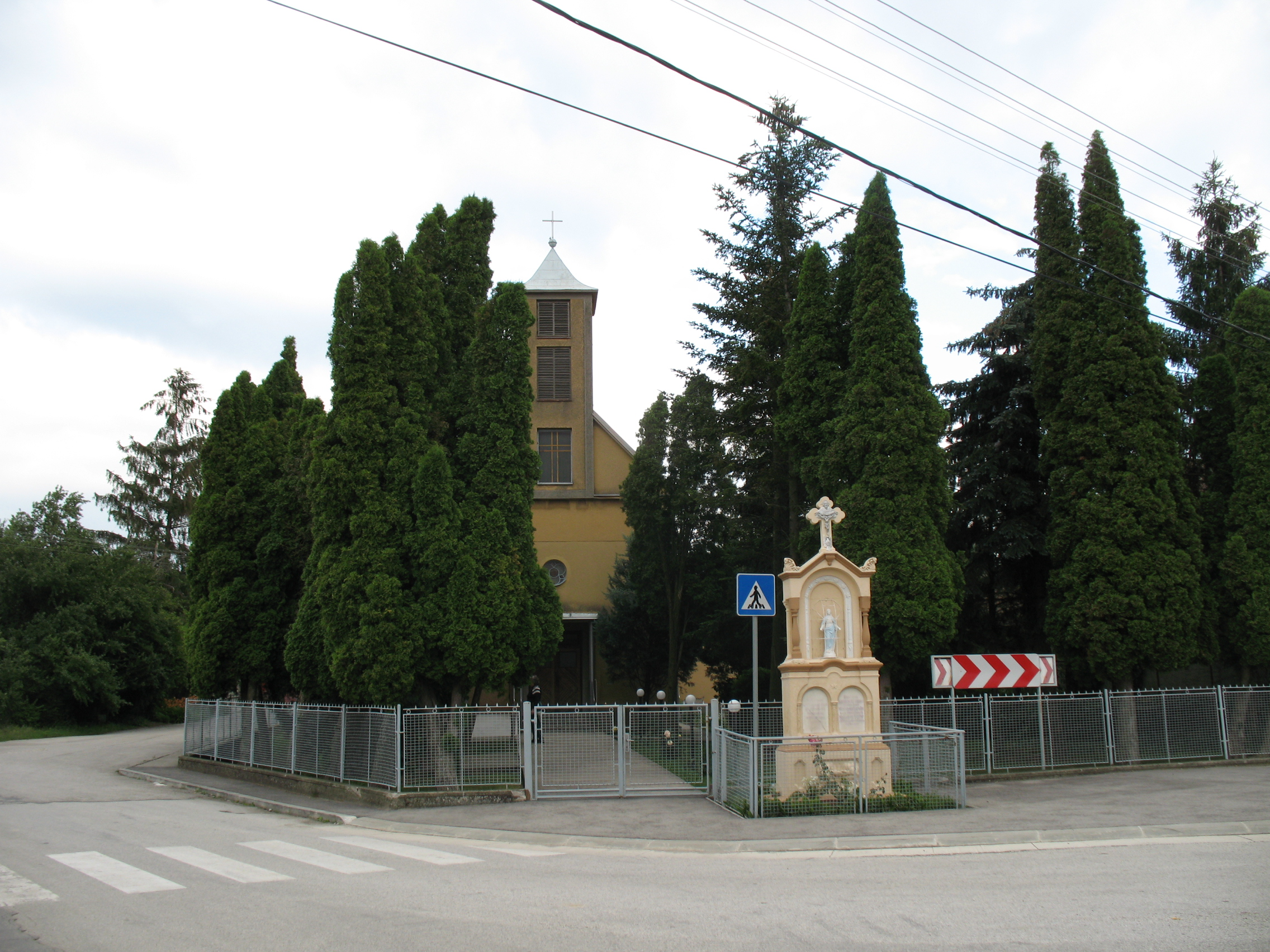
- Church in the village

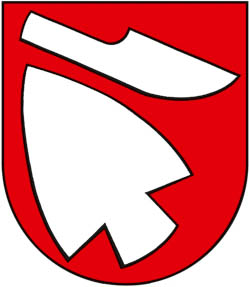
- Flag Coat of arms

- Location of Hrubý Šúr in the Bratislava Region Location of Hrubý Šúr in Slovakia
- Coordinates: 48.17°N 17.42°E
- Country: Slovakia
- Region: Bratislava Region
- District: Senec District
- First mentioned: 1245

Government
  - Mayor: Adrián Takács

Area
  - Total: 6.20 km^{2} (2.39 sq mi)
- Elevation: 124 m (407 ft)

Population (2025)
  - Total: 1,130
- Time zone: UTC+1 (CET)
  - Summer (DST): UTC+2 (CEST)
- Postal code: 925 25
- Area code: +421 6
- Vehicle registration plate (until 2022): SC
- Website: www.hruby-sur.sk

Hrubý Šúr or Hegysúr (in Slovak: Hrubý Šúr, in Hungarian: Hegysúr) is a village and municipality in western Slovakia in Senec District in the Bratislava Region.

== Geography ==
The municipality lies at an altitude of 124 metres (407 ft) and covers an area of 6.20 km^{2} (2.39 sq mi) (2025).

== History ==
In historical records the village was first mentioned in 1245. After the Austro-Hungarian army disintegrated in November 1918, Czechoslovak troops occupied the area, later acknowledged internationally by the Treaty of Trianon. Between 1938 and 1945 Hrubý Šúr once more became part of Miklós Horthy's Hungary through the First Vienna Award. From 1945 until the Velvet Divorce, it was part of Czechoslovakia. Since then it has been part of Slovakia.

== Population ==
Population statistic (10 years)
Year	1995	2005	2015	2025
Count	592	656	908	1130
Difference		+10.81%	+38.41%	+24.44%

Population statistic
Year	2024	2025
Count	1128	1130
Difference		+0.17%

It has a population of 1130 people (31 December 2025).

=== Ethnicity ===
Census 2021 (1+ %)
Ethnicity	Number	Fraction
Slovak	558	53.75%
Hungarian	450	43.35%
Not found out	62	5.97%
Total	1038	

In year 2021 was 1038 people by ethnicity 558 as Slovak, 450 as Hungarian, 62 as Not found out, 10 as Czech, 9 as Other, 2 as Rusyn, 2 as Russian, 1 as Ukrainian, 1 as Turkish and 1 as Romani.

Note on population: The difference values of population numbers in the table "Population statistic" and in the sections "Ethnicity" & "Religion" is caused by the use of various statistical methods.

=== Religion ===
Census 2021 (1+ %)
Religion	Number	Fraction
Roman Catholic Church	697	67.15%
None	180	17.34%
Not found out	64	6.17%
Evangelical Church	38	3.66%
Calvinist Church	37	3.56%
Greek Catholic Church	11	1.06%
Total	1038	

In year 2021 was 1038 people by religion 697 from Roman Catholic Church, 180 from None, 64 from Not found out, 38 from Evangelical Church, 37 from Calvinist Church, 11 from Greek Catholic Church, 4 from Ad hoc movements, 2 from Islam, 1 from Old Catholic Church, 1 from Eastern Orthodox Church, 1 from Paganism and natural spirituality, 1 from Other and 1 from Buddhism.

Population by nationality:

Nationality	1991	2001
Hungarians	82.54%	74.29%
Slovaks	16.80%	24.29%

== Genealogical resources ==
The records for genealogical research are available at the state archive "Statny Archiv in Bratislava, Slovakia"

- Roman Catholic church records (births/marriages/deaths): 1711-1898 (parish B)
- Lutheran church records (births/marriages/deaths): 1786-1896 (parish B)
- Reformated church records (births/marriages/deaths): 1784-1910 (parish B)

== See also ==
- List of municipalities and towns in Slovakia

== External links/Sources ==
- https://web.archive.org/web/20071217080336/http://www.statistics.sk/mosmis/eng/run.html
- Surnames of living people in Hruby Sur
