= Vlky =

Vlky Vők
- Municipality
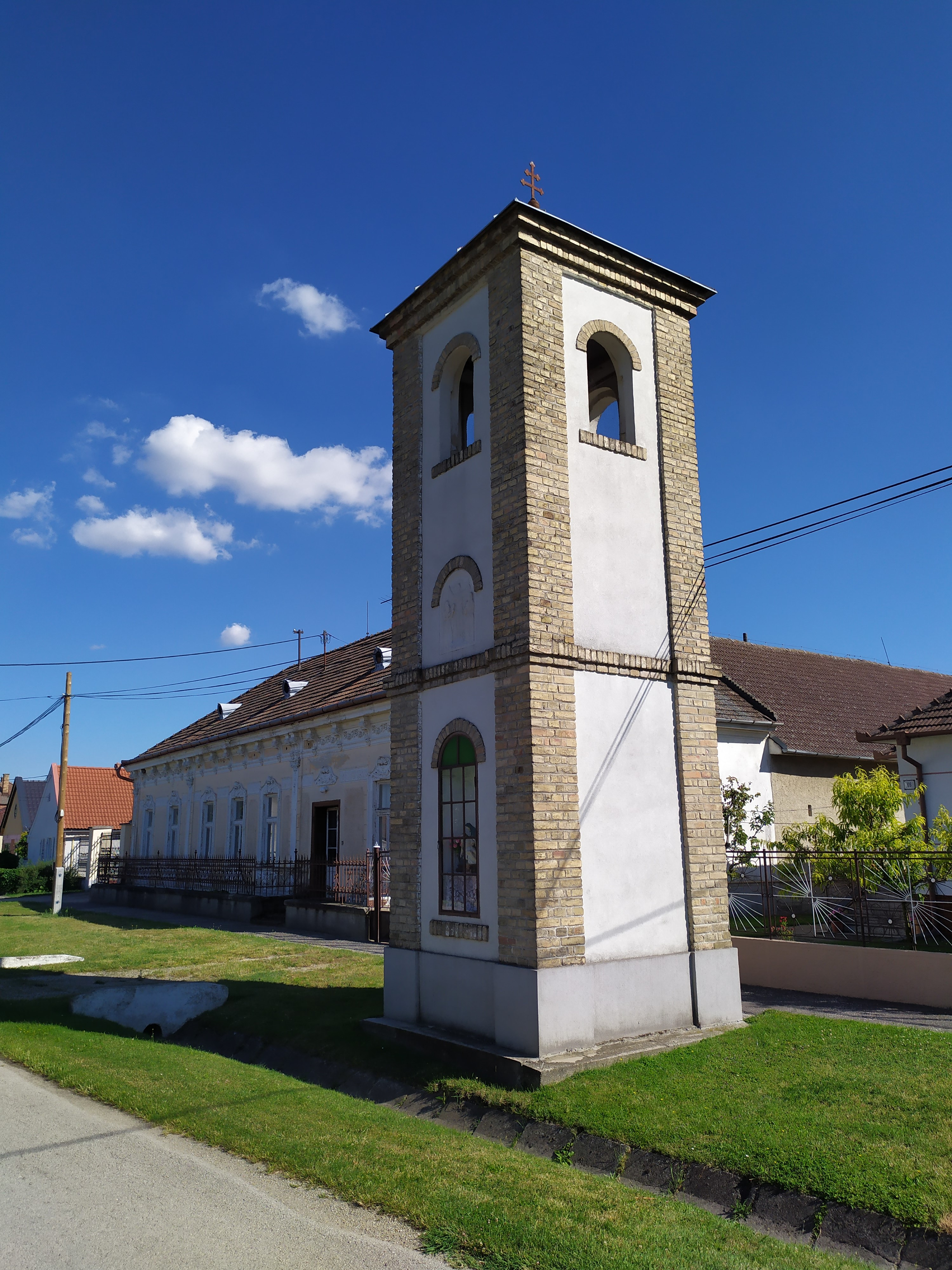

- Flag

- Location of Vlky in the Bratislava Region Location of Vlky in Slovakia
- Coordinates: 48.16°N 17.37°E
- Country: Slovakia
- Region: Bratislava Region
- District: Senec District
- First mentioned: 1260

Government
  - Mayor: Boldizsár Fejes

Area
  - Total: 3.62 km^{2} (1.40 sq mi)
- Elevation: 126 m (413 ft)

Population (2025)
  - Total: 417
- Time zone: UTC+1 (CET)
  - Summer (DST): UTC+2 (CEST)
- Postal code: 900 44
- Area code: +421 25
- Vehicle registration plate (until 2022): SC
- Website: www.vlky.eu

Vlky (Hungarian: Vők) is a village and municipality in Senec District in the Bratislava Region, in western Slovakia.

== Geography ==
The municipality lies at an altitude of 126 metres (413 ft) and covers an area of 3.62 km^{2} (1.40 sq mi) (2025).

== History ==
In historical records the village was first mentioned in 1283. After the Austro-Hungarian army disintegrated in November 1918, Czechoslovak troops occupied the area, later acknowledged internationally by the Treaty of Trianon. Between 1938 and 1945 Vlky once more became part of Miklós Horthy's Hungary through the First Vienna Award. From 1945 until the Velvet Divorce, it was part of Czechoslovakia. Since then it has been part of Slovakia.

== Population ==
Population statistic (10 years)
| Year | 1995 | 2005 | 2015 | 2025 |
|---|---|---|---|---|
| Count | 361 | 410 | 415 | 417 |
| Difference | | +13.57% | +1.21% | +0.48% |

Population statistic
| Year | 2024 | 2025 |
|---|---|---|
| Count | 415 | 417 |
| Difference | | +0.48% |

It has a population of 417 people (31 December 2025).

=== Ethnicity ===
Census 2021 (1+ %)
| Ethnicity | Number | Fraction |
|---|---|---|
| Hungarian | 258 | 62.16% |
| Slovak | 158 | 38.07% |
| Not found out | 7 | 1.68% |
| Czech | 6 | 1.44% |
| Total | 415 | |

In year 2021 was 415 people by ethnicity 258 as Hungarian, 158 as Slovak, 7 as Not found out, 6 as Czech, 3 as Other, 1 as Russian and 1 as Croatian.

Note on population: The difference values of population numbers in the table "Population statistic" and in the sections "Ethnicity" & "Religion" is caused by the use of various statistical methods.

=== Religion ===
Census 2021 (1+ %)
| Religion | Number | Fraction |
|---|---|---|
| Roman Catholic Church | 319 | 76.87% |
| None | 69 | 16.63% |
| Christian Congregations in Slovakia | 6 | 1.45% |
| Total | 415 | |

In year 2021 was 415 people by religion 319 from Roman Catholic Church, 69 from None, 6 from Christian Congregations in Slovakia, 4 from Jehovah's Witnesses, 4 from Not found out, 3 from Calvinist Church, 3 from Greek Catholic Church, 3 from Evangelical Church, 2 from Buddhism and 2 from Baptists Church.

Population by nationality (2001):

- Hungarian: 77,44%,
- Slovak: 21,05%.

== External links/Sources ==
- Media related to Vlky at Wikimedia Commons
- https://web.archive.org/web/20051125052434/http://www.statistics.sk/mosmis/eng/run.html
