= Tomášov =

Tomášov Fél
- Municipality
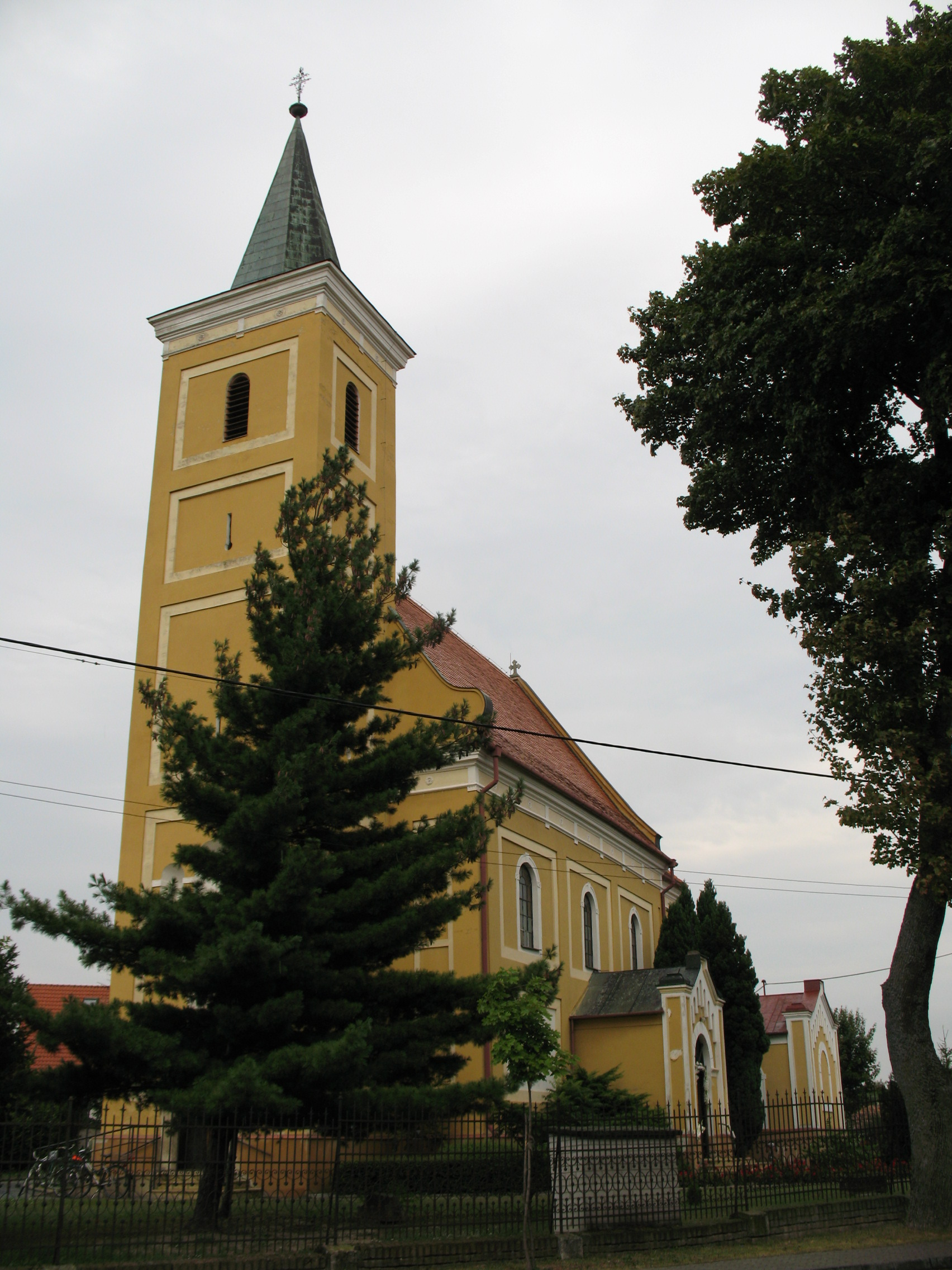

- Flag

- Location of Tomášov in the Bratislava Region Location of Tomášov in Slovakia
- Coordinates: 48.14°N 17.34°E
- Country: Slovakia
- Region: Bratislava Region
- District: Senec District
- First mentioned: 1250

Government
  - Mayor: István Pomichal

Area
  - Total: 19.82 km^{2} (7.65 sq mi)
- Elevation: 127 m (417 ft)

Population (2025)
  - Total: 2,851
- Time zone: UTC+1 (CET)
  - Summer (DST): UTC+2 (CEST)
- Postal code: 900 44
- Area code: +421 22
- Vehicle registration plate (until 2022): SC
- Website: www.tomasov.sk

Tomášov (Hungarian: Fél) is a village and municipality in western Slovakia in Senec District in the Bratislava Region.

== Names and etymology ==
The name comes from a personal name with the Slavic/Slovak possessive suffix -ov. In historical records the modern name of the village was first mentioned in 1434 (Tomaschoff). In 1456, the village was mentioned as Thamashaza.

Fél (1250, Feel) - the official modern name of Tomášov in the language of the Hungarian national minority was initially a separate village, but nowadays it is part of Tomášov.

== Geography ==
The municipality lies at an altitude of 127 metres (417 ft) and covers an area of 19.82 km^{2} (7.65 sq mi) (2025).

== History ==
In historical records the village was first mentioned on 4 December 1250 as Feél.

There is a baroque manor house built in 18th century on the side of the village.

== Population ==
Population statistic (10 years)
Year	1995	2005	2015	2025
Count	2004	2204	2469	2851
Difference		+9.98%	+12.02%	+15.47%

Population statistic
Year	2024	2025
Count	2857	2851
Difference		−0.21%

It has a population of 2851 people (31 December 2025).

=== Ethnicity ===
Census 2021 (1+ %)
Ethnicity	Number	Fraction
Slovak	1706	62.83%
Hungarian	968	35.65%
Not found out	135	4.97%
Total	2715	

In year 2021 was 2715 people by ethnicity 1706 as Slovak, 968 as Hungarian, 135 as Not found out, 22 as Czech, 12 as Other, 5 as Ukrainian, 4 as Romanian, 4 as German, 3 as Russian, 2 as Romani, 2 as Moravian, 2 as Albanian, 1 as Vietnamese and 1 as Austrian.

Note on population: The difference values of population numbers in the table "Population statistic" and in the sections "Ethnicity" & "Religion" is caused by the use of various statistical methods.

=== Religion ===
Census 2021 (1+ %)
Religion	Number	Fraction
Roman Catholic Church	1723	63.46%
None	693	25.52%
Not found out	120	4.42%
Evangelical Church	71	2.62%
Greek Catholic Church	28	1.03%
Total	2715	

In year 2021 was 2715 people by religion 1723 from Roman Catholic Church, 693 from None, 120 from Not found out, 71 from Evangelical Church, 28 from Greek Catholic Church, 16 from Calvinist Church, 11 from Christian Congregations in Slovakia, 10 from Other, 7 from Ad hoc movements, 6 from Paganism and natural spirituality, 6 from Other and not ascertained christian church, 5 from Eastern Orthodox Church, 4 from Buddhism, 3 from Jehovah's Witnesses, 3 from Baptists Church, 2 from Islam, 2 from United Methodist Church, 2 from Czechoslovak Hussite Church, 1 from Jewish community, 1 from Church of the Brethren and 1 from Apostolic Church.
