= Kostolná pri Dunaji =

Kostolná pri Dunaji Egyházfa
- Municipality
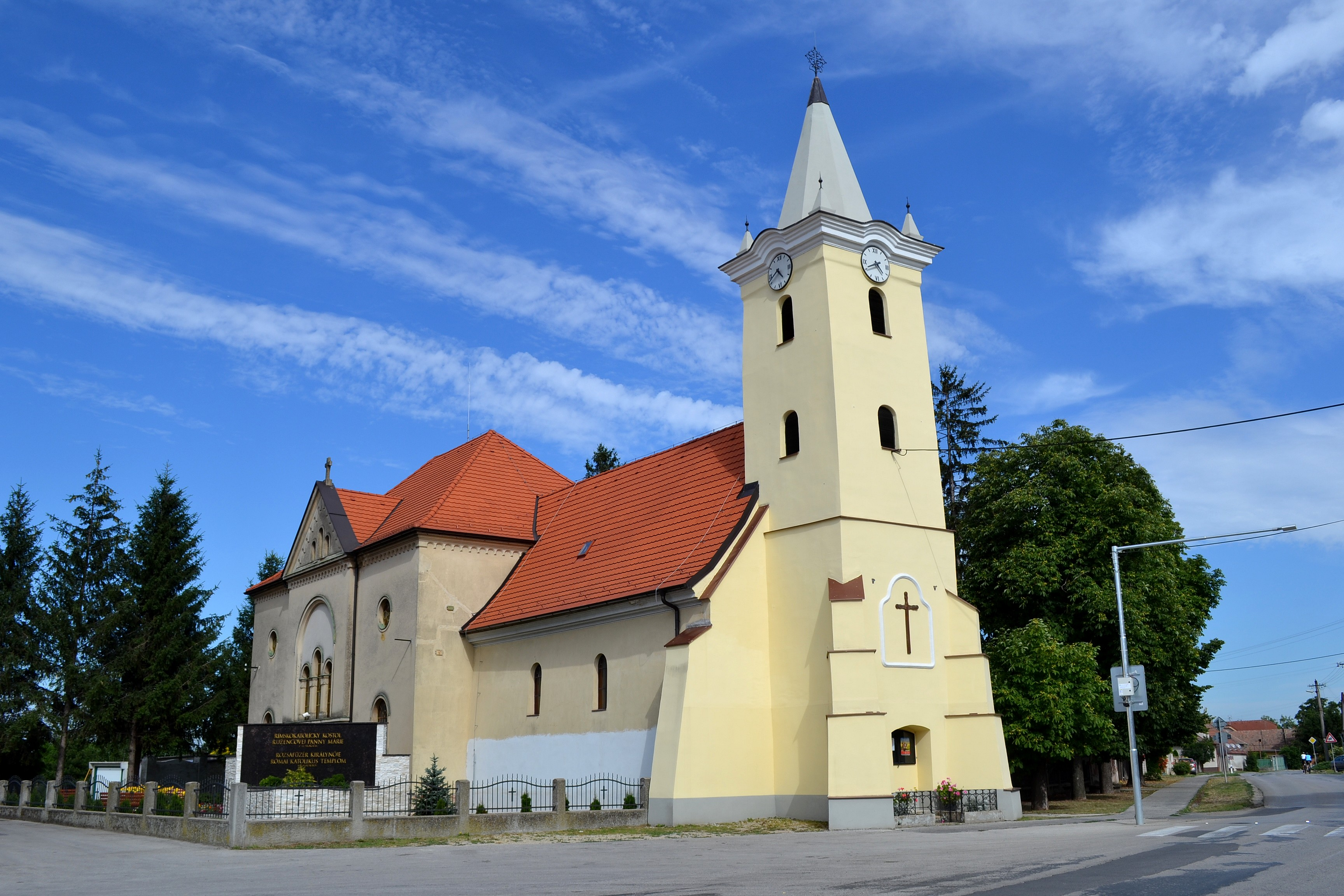
- Church of Our Lady of the Rosary

- Flag

- Location of Kostolná pri Dunaji in the Bratislava Region Location of Kostolná pri Dunaji in Slovakia
- Coordinates: 48.19°N 17.43°E
- Country: Slovakia
- Region: Bratislava Region
- District: Senec District
- First mentioned: 1332

Government
  - Mayor: Igor Šillo

Area
  - Total: 8.07 km^{2} (3.12 sq mi)
- Elevation: 124 m (407 ft)

Population (2025)
  - Total: 936
- Time zone: UTC+1 (CET)
  - Summer (DST): UTC+2 (CEST)
- Postal code: 903 01
- Area code: +421 8
- Vehicle registration plate (until 2022): SC
- Website: www.kostolnapridunaji.sk

Kostolná pri Dunaji (Hungarian: Egyházfa, meaning Church Tree, Slovak: Kostolná pri Dunaji, meaning "Churchville by the Danube") is a village and municipality in western Slovakia in Senec District in the Bratislava Region.

== Geography ==
The municipality lies at an altitude of 124 metres (407 ft) and covers an area of 8.07 km^{2} (3.12 sq mi) (2025).

== Population ==
Population statistic (10 years)
Year	1995	2005	2015	2025
Count	452	467	618	936
Difference		+3.31%	+32.33%	+51.45%

Population statistic
Year	2024	2025
Count	901	936
Difference		+3.88%

It has a population of 936 people (31 December 2025).

=== Ethnicity ===
Census 2021 (1+ %)
Ethnicity	Number	Fraction
Slovak	496	63.5%
Hungarian	300	38.41%
Not found out	18	2.3%
Other	10	1.28%
Total	781	

In year 2021 was 781 people by ethnicity 496 as Slovak, 300 as Hungarian, 18 as Not found out, 10 as Other, 6 as Czech, 6 as Rusyn, 1 as Jewish, 1 as Ukrainian and 1 as German.

Note on population: The difference values of population numbers in the table "Population statistic" and in the sections "Ethnicity" & "Religion" is caused by the use of various statistical methods.

=== Religion ===
Census 2021 (1+ %)
Religion	Number	Fraction
Roman Catholic Church	549	70.29%
None	154	19.72%
Evangelical Church	22	2.82%
Not found out	21	2.69%
Greek Catholic Church	13	1.66%
Christian Congregations in Slovakia	12	1.54%
Total	781	

In year 2021 was 781 people by religion 549 from Roman Catholic Church, 154 from None, 22 from Evangelical Church, 21 from Not found out, 13 from Greek Catholic Church, 12 from Christian Congregations in Slovakia, 5 from Calvinist Church, 3 from Ad hoc movements, 1 from Other and not ascertained christian church and 1 from Other.

== History ==
In historical records the village was first mentioned in 1332. After the Austro-Hungarian army disintegrated in November 1918, Czechoslovak troops occupied the area, later acknowledged internationally by the Treaty of Trianon. Between 1938 and 1945 Kostolná pri Dunaji once more became occupied by Miklós Horthy's Hungary through the First Vienna Award. From 1945 until the Velvet Divorce, it was part of Czechoslovakia. Since then it has been part of Slovakia.

== Population ==
According to the 2011 census, the municipality had 508 inhabitants. 265 of inhabitants were Hungarians, 235 Slovaks and 8 others and unspecified.

== See also ==
- List of municipalities and towns in Slovakia

== Genealogical resources ==
The records for genealogical research are available at the state archive "Statny Archiv in Bratislava, Slovakia"

- Roman Catholic church records (births/marriages/deaths): 1711-1898 (parish A)

== External links/Sources ==
- Official website
- https://web.archive.org/web/20070513023228/http://www.statistics.sk/mosmis/eng/run.html
- Surnames of living people in Kostolna pri Dunaji
