= Tureň =

Tureň Zonctorony
- Municipality
- Flag

- Location of Tureň in the Bratislava Region Location of Tureň in Slovakia
- Coordinates: 48.19°N 17.39°E
- Country: Slovakia
- Region: Bratislava Region
- District: Senec District
- First mentioned: 1252

Government
  - Mayor: Dominik Cisár

Area
  - Total: 5.30 km^{2} (2.05 sq mi)
- Elevation: 126 m (413 ft)

Population (2025)
  - Total: 1,303
- Time zone: UTC+1 (CET)
  - Summer (DST): UTC+2 (CEST)
- Postal code: 903 01
- Area code: +421 23
- Vehicle registration plate (until 2022): SC
- Website: www.obecturen.sk

Tureň (Hungarian: Zonctorony) is a village and municipality in western Slovakia in Senec District in the Bratislava Region.

== Geography ==
The municipality lies at an altitude of 126 metres (413 ft) and covers an area of 5.30 km^{2} (2.05 sq mi) (2025).

== History ==
In historical records the village was first mentioned in 1252. After the Austro-Hungarian army disintegrated in November 1918, Czechoslovak troops occupied the area, later acknowledged internationally by the Treaty of Trianon. Between 1938 and 1945 Tureň once more became part of Miklós Horthy's Hungary through the First Vienna Award. From 1945 until the Velvet Divorce, it was part of Czechoslovakia. Since then it has been part of Slovakia.

== Population ==
Population statistic (10 years)
Year	1995	2005	2015	2025
Count	845	898	1115	1303
Difference		+6.27%	+24.16%	+16.86%

Population statistic
Year	2024	2025
Count	1282	1303
Difference		+1.63%

It has a population of 1303 people (31 December 2025).

=== Ethnicity ===
Census 2021 (1+ %)
Ethnicity	Number	Fraction
Slovak	634	52.22%
Hungarian	615	50.65%
Not found out	32	2.63%
Total	1214	

In year 2021 was 1214 people by ethnicity 634 as Slovak, 615 as Hungarian, 32 as Not found out, 6 as Ukrainian, 5 as Czech, 5 as Other, 3 as Rusyn, 2 as Serbian, 2 as Romanian, 2 as French, 1 as Jewish, 1 as Romani and 1 as Russian.

Note on population: The difference values of population numbers in the table "Population statistic" and in the sections "Ethnicity" & "Religion" is caused by the use of various statistical methods.

=== Religion ===
Census 2021 (1+ %)
Religion	Number	Fraction
Roman Catholic Church	804	66.23%
None	296	24.38%
Evangelical Church	32	2.64%
Not found out	30	2.47%
Total	1214	

In year 2021 was 1214 people by religion 804 from Roman Catholic Church, 296 from None, 32 from Evangelical Church, 30 from Not found out, 10 from Calvinist Church, 9 from Christian Congregations in Slovakia, 7 from Eastern Orthodox Church, 6 from Ad hoc movements, 4 from Jehovah's Witnesses, 4 from Greek Catholic Church, 3 from Buddhism, 3 from Apostolic Church, 2 from Seventh-day Adventist Church, 1 from Old Catholic Church, 1 from Other and not ascertained christian church, 1 from Other and 1 from Bahá'i Community.

== External links/Sources ==
- http://turen.sk/
- http://www.statistics.sk/mosmis/eng/run.html
