= Čataj =

Čataj Csataj
- Municipality
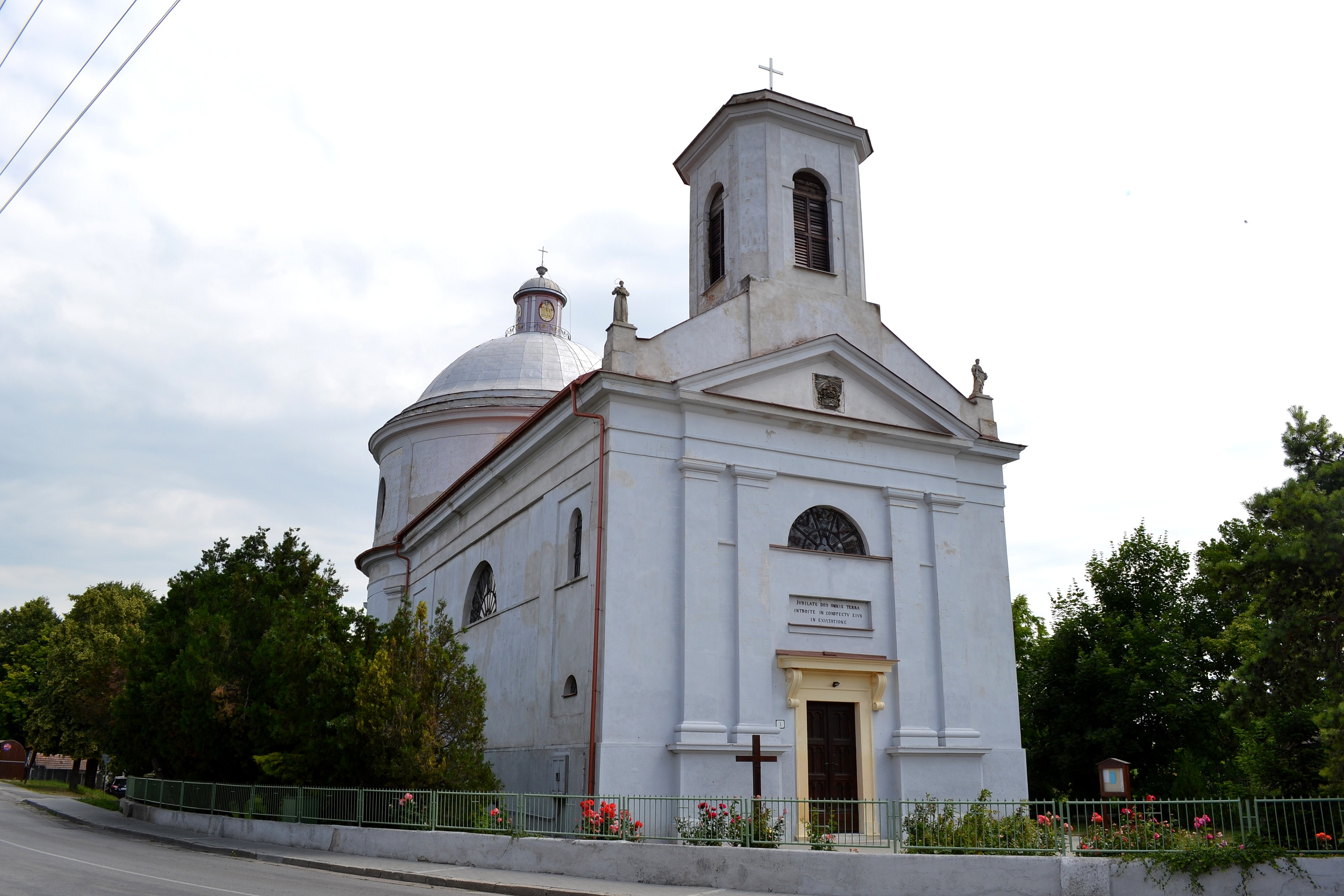
- Church of Saint Margaret of Antioch

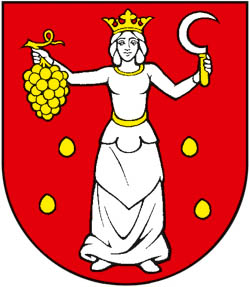
- Flag Coat of arms

- Location of Čataj in the Bratislava Region Location of Čataj in Slovakia
- Coordinates: 48.27°N 17.48°E
- Country: Slovakia
- Region: Bratislava Region
- District: Senec District
- First mentioned: 1244

Area
  - Total: 12.86 km^{2} (4.97 sq mi)
- Elevation: 133 m (436 ft)

Population (2025)
  - Total: 1,177
- Time zone: UTC+1 (CET)
  - Summer (DST): UTC+2 (CEST)
- Postal code: 900 83
- Area code: +421 33
- Vehicle registration plate (until 2022): SC
- Website: www.cataj.sk

Čataj (Hungarian: Csataj) is a village and municipality in western Slovakia in Senec District in the Bratislava region. This typical agricultural village has fewer than 1000 inhabitants and is located aside from major roads, roughly between Senec and Trnava.

== Etymology ==
Čata: the archaic name for residents responsible for guarding the assigned area (in the modern Slovak čata: a squad). Chatey 1244, Czataj 1773. See also Čata in the Levice District.

== Geography ==
The municipality lies at an altitude of 133 metres (436 ft) and covers an area of 12.86 km^{2} (4.97 sq mi) (2025).

== History ==
Early archaeological digs show that people settled the area around Čataj as early as 5000 BC. The town was mentioned for the first time in 1244, under the name "posesio Chatey". In the next few centuries the town and surrounding lands were given as gifts to several different families loyal to the Hungarian crown.

In the 14th century, German colonists settled in Čataj, and until the 18th century the town was almost exclusively German. During this period, the town built a Catholic rectory (1397) and a church in 1721. Later, in 1845 the current church was built in Neoclassical style. The church was repaired twice in the second half of the twentieth century, and along with a much newer Catholic Evangelical church serve the local community.

== Culture and entertainment ==
Čataj is famous primarily for its ornamental embroidery of blouses and tablecloths. These artworks have been sold all over the world, and one of them is said to have served as Pope John Paul II's tablecloth. Folk art also survives in the form of two music bands, the brass band Čatajanka and the gypsy folk band Farkašovci, which have toured beyond the borders of Slovakia. In addition, the village has a local folk dance group, Tulipán.

Due to its quiet and slow life and its agricultural character, Čataj has been often used as backdrops for movies and other art by movie directors Martin Slivka and Martin Ťapák, the cinematographer, photographer and folk art collector Karol Plicka and others.

In addition to folk art, the village organizes annual hunts and has a soccer team, which is regularly on the last place of Slovakia's lowest, sixth division of its soccer league. The village also organizes numerous dances in its cultural center.

== Population ==
Population statistic (10 years)
Year	1995	2005	2015	2025
Count	953	982	1171	1177
Difference		+3.04%	+19.24%	+0.51%

Population statistic
Year	2024	2025
Count	1191	1177
Difference		−1.17%

It has a population of 1177 people (31 December 2025).

=== Ethnicity ===
Census 2021 (1+ %)
Ethnicity	Number	Fraction
Slovak	1118	92.78%
Not found out	79	6.55%
Hungarian	14	1.16%
Total	1205	

In year 2021 was 1205 people by ethnicity 1118 as Slovak, 79 as Not found out, 14 as Hungarian, 3 as Czech, 3 as Rusyn, 1 as Vietnamese, 1 as Russian, 1 as Austrian, 1 as Polish, 1 as French and 1 as Albanian.

Note on population: The difference values of population numbers in the table "Population statistic" and in the sections "Ethnicity" & "Religion" is caused by the use of various statistical methods.

=== Religion ===
Census 2021 (1+ %)
Religion	Number	Fraction
Roman Catholic Church	663	55.02%
None	232	19.25%
Evangelical Church	201	16.68%
Not found out	77	6.39%
Total	1205	

In year 2021 was 1205 people by religion 663 from Roman Catholic Church, 232 from None, 201 from Evangelical Church, 77 from Not found out, 8 from Greek Catholic Church, 7 from Baptists Church, 6 from Other, 3 from Apostolic Church, 2 from Eastern Orthodox Church, 1 from Calvinist Church, 1 from Islam, 1 from United Methodist Church, 1 from Buddhism, 1 from Bahá'i Community and 1 from Ad hoc movements.

In 2004 the town had 972 inhabitants: 471 men and 501 women. 99.1% were of Slovak ethnicity; the only two declared minorities were Hungarian and Czech. 64.3% of inhabitants were Roman Catholic, 24.8% Evangelical Catholic and 7.3% atheist.

Of the 314 houses in the village 261 were permanently inhabited

== See also ==
- List of municipalities and towns in Slovakia

== Genealogical resources ==
The records for genealogical research are available at the state archive "Statny Archiv in Bratislava, Slovakia"

- Roman Catholic church records (births/marriages/deaths): 1728-1895 (parish A)
- Lutheran church records (births/marriages/deaths): 1701-1896 (parish B)
