= Boldog, Slovakia =

Boldog
- Municipality
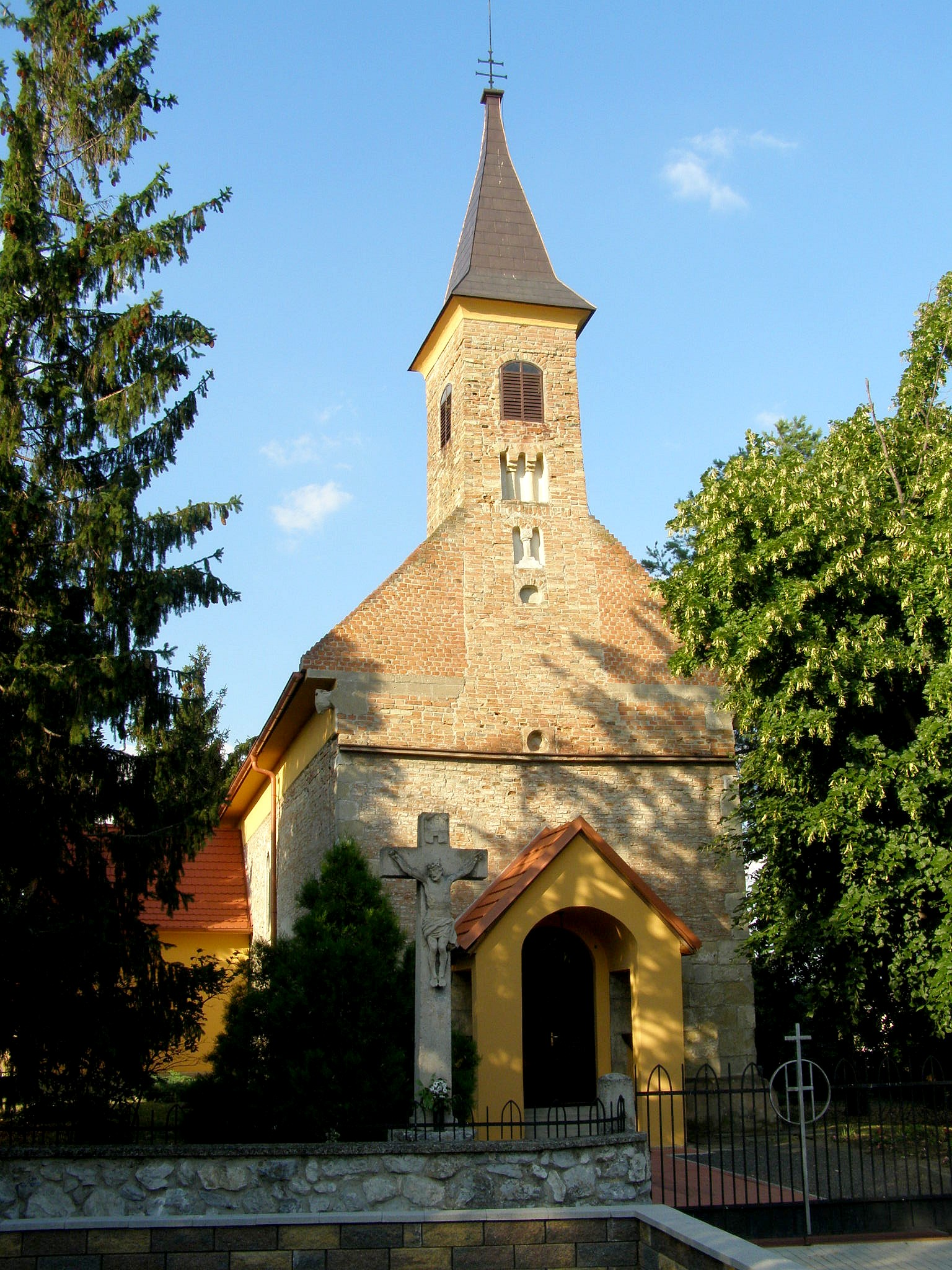

- Flag

- Location of Boldog in the Bratislava Region Location of Boldog in Slovakia
- Coordinates: 48.24°N 17.43°E
- Country: Slovakia
- Region: Bratislava Region
- District: Senec District
- First mentioned: 1245

Government
  - Mayor: Alajos Časný

Area
  - Total: 4.49 km^{2} (1.73 sq mi)
- Elevation: 123 m (404 ft)

Population (2025)
  - Total: 538
- Time zone: UTC+1 (CET)
  - Summer (DST): UTC+2 (CEST)
- Postal code: 925 26
- Area code: +421 4
- Vehicle registration plate (until 2022): SC
- Website: www.boldog.sk

Boldog (in Slovak: Boldog, in Hungarian: Pozsonyboldogfa) is a village and municipality in western Slovakia in Senec District in the Bratislava Region.

== Geography ==
The municipality lies at an altitude of 123 metres (404 ft) and covers an area of 4.49 km^{2} (1.73 sq mi) (2025).

== History ==
In the 9th century, the territory of Boldog was part of possibly of Greater Moravia and from 1000 part of the Kingdom of Hungary. In historical records the village was first mentioned in 1245. After the Austro-Hungarian army disintegrated in November 1918, Czechoslovak troops occupied the area and by the Treaty of Trianon, the village became part of Czechoslovakia. Between 1938 and 1945 Boldog became part Hungary again through the First Vienna Award. From 1945 until the Velvet Divorce, it was part of Czechoslovakia. Since then it has been part of Slovakia.

== Roman Inscription ==
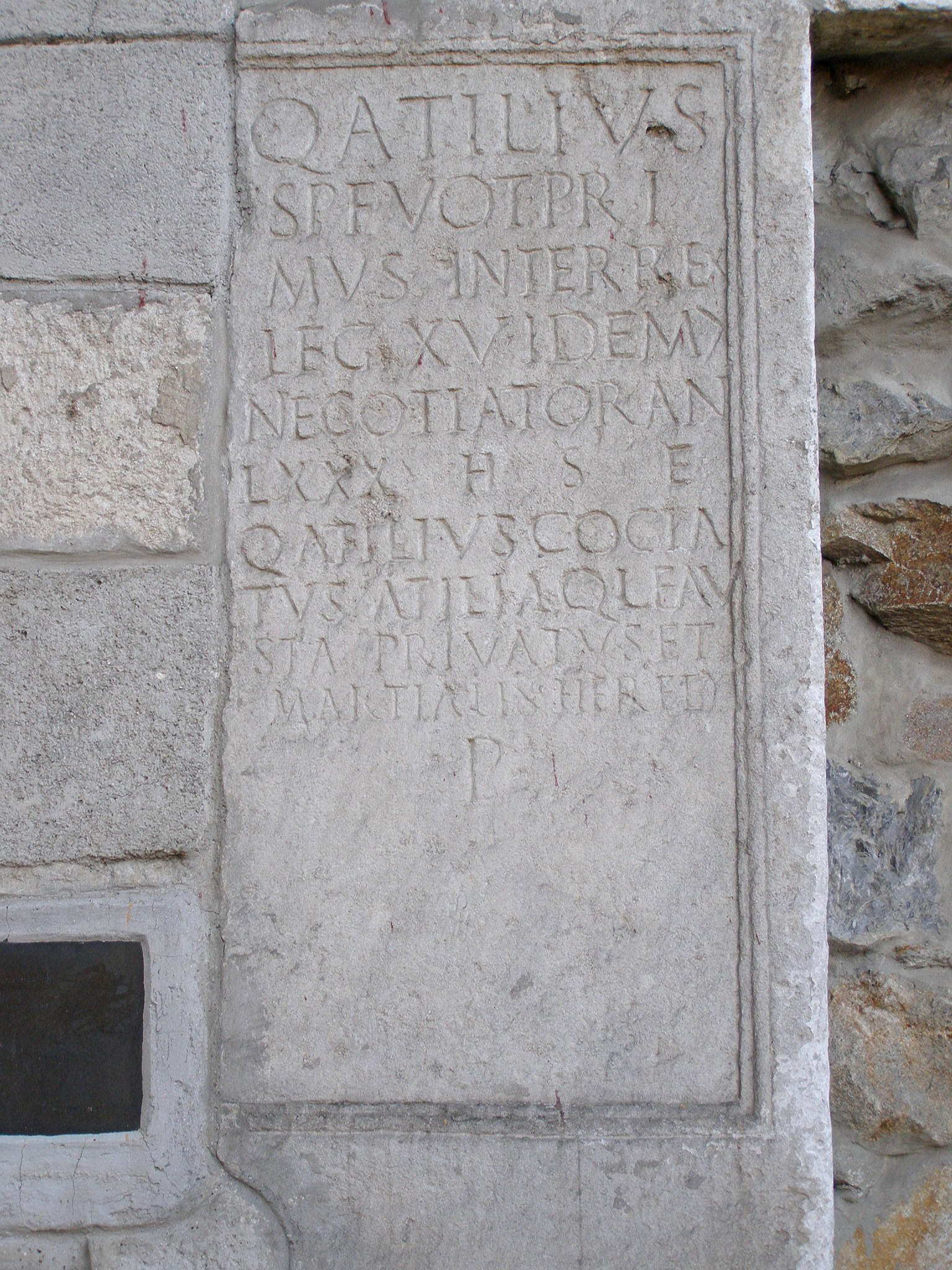
The gravestone of Q. Atilius Primus

In 1978, during restoration work in the church, a remarkable gravestone for a Roman Centurion of Legio XV Apollinaris, who is also described as a 'Negotiator' or trader, was found in the wall of the sacristy. The inscription is as follows:

Q ATILIVS
SP.F.VOT.PRI
MVS.INTER R EX
LEG XV.IDEM.
NEGOTIATOR.AN
LXXX. HSE
Q.ATILIVS COCI
TUS.ATILIA QL EAV
STA.PRIVATUS.ET
MARTIALIS.HERED
P
L

According to Dr. Titus Kolník inscription translates as: Quintus Atilius Primus, son of Spurio Tribune Votbrimus (or of the tribe Voturina. Interpreter XV. Legion centurion and businessman. He lived 80 years, is buried here. Quintus Atilius Cogitatus, Atilia, Quint L EAV Privatus and Martialis heirs. P had erected. The XV legion was stationed at Carnuntum, a Roman Limes, or frontier fort on the Danube and the gravestone is likely to date from between 90-138AD. As Boldog lies between Bratislava and Trnava, to the east of the Danube, Quintus Atilius Primus must have died outside the area of the Roman Empire. This might indicate that there was a trading post in the vicinity, to which he moved after his career in the Roman Army.

== The Parish Church ==
The Church, dedicated to the Assumption of the Blessed Virgin Mary is one of a group of Romanesque churches in Western Slovakia. The first phase dates from first half of the 12th century, or even the 11th century AD. Around 1220 the church was extended to the west, and a tower built with a triple tiered arrangement of Romanesque window openings. Brick was used for this extension, as was the case at Dražovce church near Nitra. Other Romanesque features include a finely carved baptismal font, a decorative Tympanum over the west door and grotesque animal head brackets below the eaves of the roof. In 1280 the Church and the village came into the ownership of the Poor Clares and between 1364 and 1370 they made modifications to the church in the Gothic style.

== Population ==
Population statistic (10 years)
Year	1995	2005	2015	2025
Count	395	417	445	538
Difference		+5.56%	+6.71%	+20.89%

Population statistic
Year	2024	2025
Count	529	538
Difference		+1.70%

It has a population of 538 people (31 December 2025).

=== Ethnicity ===
Census 2021 (1+ %)
Ethnicity	Number	Fraction
Hungarian	249	51.02%
Slovak	242	49.59%
Not found out	24	4.91%
Czech	5	1.02%
Total	488	

In year 2021 was 488 people by ethnicity 249 as Hungarian, 242 as Slovak, 24 as Not found out, 5 as Czech, 3 as Ukrainian, 3 as Other, 1 as Romani and 1 as Russian.

Note on population: The difference values of population numbers in the table "Population statistic" and in the sections "Ethnicity" & "Religion" is caused by the use of various statistical methods.

=== Religion ===
Census 2021 (1+ %)
Religion	Number	Fraction
Roman Catholic Church	284	58.2%
None	111	22.75%
Calvinist Church	52	10.66%
Not found out	20	4.1%
Total	488	

In year 2021 was 488 people by religion 284 from Roman Catholic Church, 111 from None, 52 from Calvinist Church, 20 from Not found out, 4 from Evangelical Church, 3 from Jehovah's Witnesses, 3 from Ad hoc movements, 2 from Eastern Orthodox Church, 2 from Other and not ascertained christian church, 2 from Greek Catholic Church, 2 from Buddhism, 1 from Paganism and natural spirituality, 1 from Other and 1 from Apostolic Church.

Population by nationality:

Nationality	1991	2001	2011
Hungarians	79.80%	70.30%	56,07%
Slovaks	18.20%	24.50%	37,38%
Czechs	1%	1.8%	0,2%
English			0,70%

== External links/Sources ==
Media related to Boldog, Slovakia at Wikimedia Commons

- Details of the discovery of the Roman Gravestone
- Statistical Office of the Slovak republic
