= Chorvátsky Grob =

Chorvátsky Grob Hrvatski Grob
- Municipality
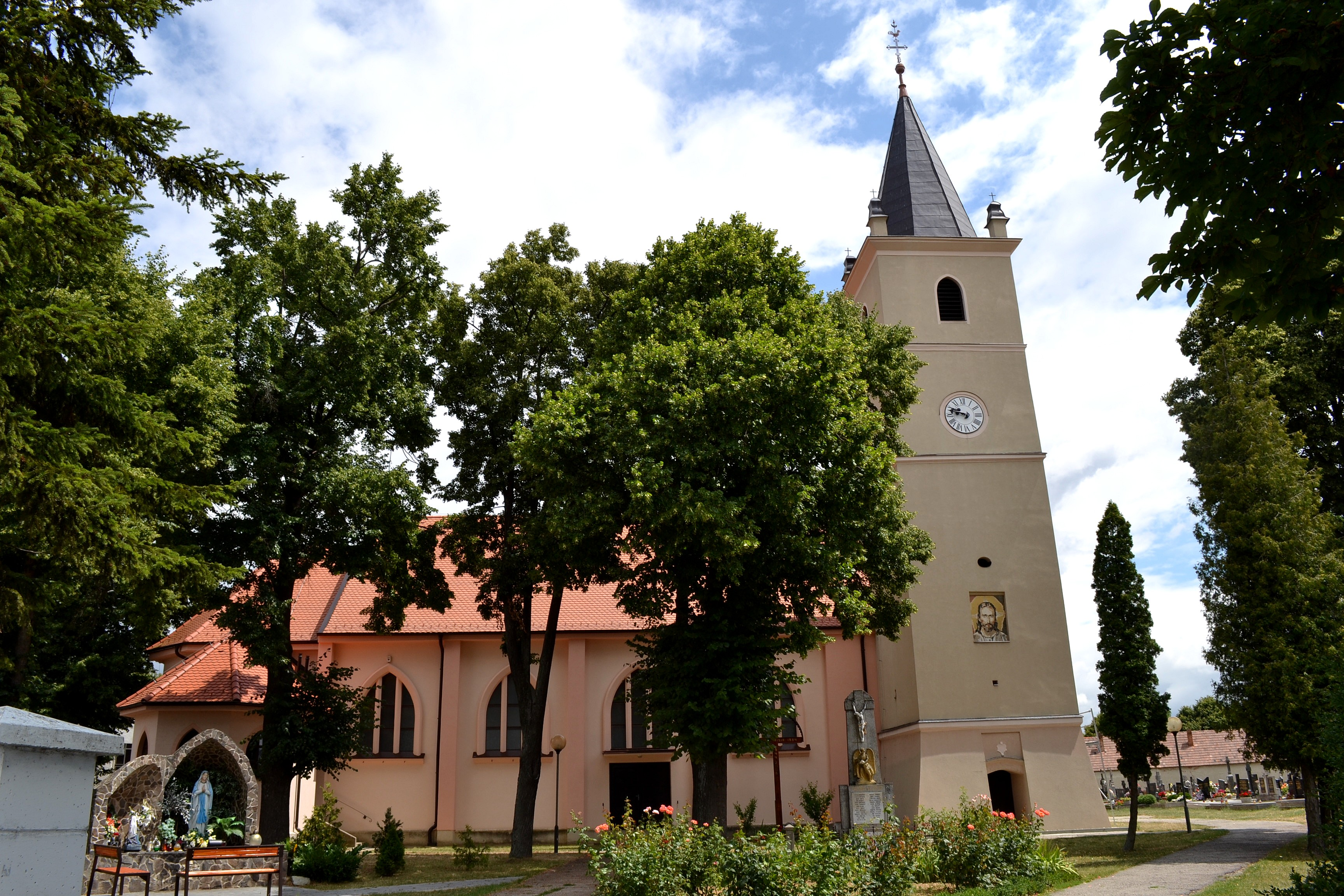
- The King Church

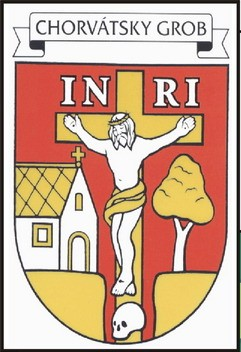
- Flag Coat of arms

- Location of Chorvátsky Grob in the Bratislava Region Location of Chorvátsky Grob in Slovakia
- Coordinates: 48.23°N 17.29°E
- Country: Slovakia
- Region: Bratislava Region
- District: Senec District
- First mentioned: 1552

Government
  - Mayor: Vladimíra Vydrová

Area
  - Total: 15.11 km^{2} (5.83 sq mi)
- Elevation: 141 m (463 ft)

Population (2025)
  - Total: 8,047
- Time zone: UTC+1 (CET)
  - Summer (DST): UTC+2 (CEST)
- Postal code: 900 25
- Area code: +421 13
- Vehicle registration plate (until 2022): SC
- Website: www.chorvatskygrob.sk

Chorvátsky Grob (Croatian: Hrvatski Grob, Hungarian: Horvátgurab, Horvát-Gurab, German: Kroatisch-Eisgrub) is a village and municipality in western Slovakia in Senec District in the Bratislava region. It has a population of around 6,000 people.

The village's name Chorvátsky means Croatian. This refers to the Croatian people that have lived in the area since the early 16th century. This population arrived here after escaping the area between Sisak and Kostajnica during the Ottoman Wars. The area was settled by Croatians escaping from Turkish Ottoman raids which helps explain the etymology of the present-day name from "Horvát Gurab" to "Chorvátsky Grob" (Croatian Grave) used at the present time.

According to the local municipality website of Chorvátsky Grob the Slovak word for "grob" is " hrob" or, in English "grave". Reportedly, this place was named in memory of soldiers, though it is not clear if those soldiers were Croats, Slovaks or another ethnicity.

== Geography ==
The municipality lies at an altitude of 141 metres (463 ft) and covers an area of 15.11 km^{2} (5.83 sq mi) (2025).

== Population ==
Population statistic (10 years)
Year	1995	2005	2015	2025
Count	1526	1877	5040	8047
Difference		+23.00%	+168.51%	+59.66%

Population statistic
Year	2024	2025
Count	7885	8047
Difference		+2.05%

It has a population of 8047 people (31 December 2025).

=== Ethnicity ===
Census 2021 (1+ %)
Ethnicity	Number	Fraction
Slovak	6230	91.21%
Not found out	405	5.92%
Hungarian	83	1.21%
Total	6830	

In year 2021 was 6830 people by ethnicity 6230 as Slovak, 405 as Not found out, 83 as Hungarian, 67 as Czech, 65 as Other, 65 as Croatian, 49 as Rusyn, 48 as Vietnamese, 18 as Ukrainian, 14 as Russian, 14 as Polish, 13 as Italian, 12 as German, 10 as Austrian, 8 as French, 7 as Jewish, 7 as English, 6 as Turkish, 4 as Bulgarian, 3 as Korean, 2 as Chinese, 2 as Romani, 1 as Irish, 1 as Serbian, 1 as Moravian, 1 as Canadian and 1 as Albanian.

Note on population: The difference values of population numbers in the table "Population statistic" and in the sections "Ethnicity" & "Religion" is caused by the use of various statistical methods.

=== Religion ===
Census 2021 (1+ %)
Religion	Number	Fraction
Roman Catholic Church	3037	44.47%
None	2796	40.94%
Not found out	399	5.84%
Evangelical Church	203	2.97%
Greek Catholic Church	116	1.7%
Total	6830	

In year 2021 was 6830 people by religion 3037 from Roman Catholic Church, 2796 from None, 399 from Not found out, 203 from Evangelical Church, 116 from Greek Catholic Church, 45 from Ad hoc movements, 38 from Other, 32 from Eastern Orthodox Church, 31 from Calvinist Church, 28 from Baptists Church, 16 from Islam, 16 from Buddhism, 14 from Other and not ascertained christian church, 12 from Paganism and natural spirituality, 11 from Church of the Brethren, 9 from Christian Congregations in Slovakia, 9 from Apostolic Church, 6 from Jehovah's Witnesses, 5 from Jewish community, 3 from Bahá'i Community, 2 from United Methodist Church, 1 from Old Catholic Church and 1 from Church of Jesus Christ of Latter-day Saints.

== Twin towns – sister cities ==
Chorvátsky Grob is twinned with:

- Benkovac, Croatia

== See also ==
- List of municipalities and towns in Slovakia

== Genealogical resources ==
The records for genealogical research are available at the state archive "Státný archiv in Bratislava, Slovakia"

- Roman Catholic church records (births/marriages/deaths): 1705–1896 (parish A)
