= Nová Dedinka =

Nová Dedinka Dunasápújfalu
- Municipality
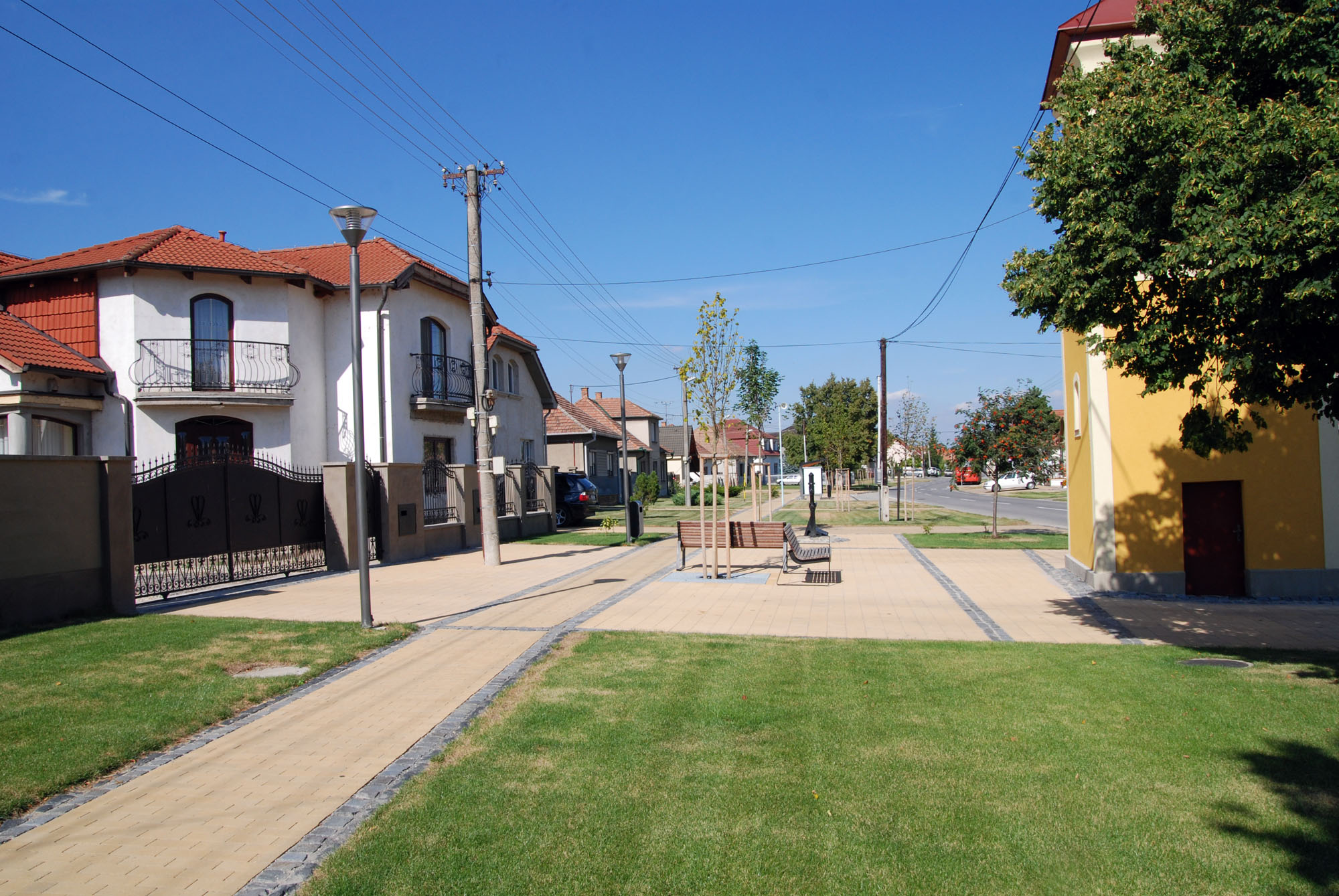

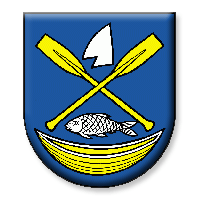
- Flag Coat of arms

- Location of Nová Dedinka in the Bratislava Region Location of Nová Dedinka in Slovakia
- Coordinates: 48.19°N 17.36°E
- Country: Slovakia
- Region: Bratislava Region
- District: Senec District
- First mentioned: 1252

Area
  - Total: 10.24 km^{2} (3.95 sq mi)
- Elevation: 128 m (420 ft)

Population (2025)
  - Total: 3,679
- Time zone: UTC+1 (CET)
  - Summer (DST): UTC+2 (CEST)
- Postal code: 900 29
- Area code: +421 19
- Vehicle registration plate (until 2022): SC
- Website: www.novadedinka.sk

Nová Dedinka (Hungarian: Dunasápújfalu) is a village and municipality in western Slovakia in Senec District in the Bratislava Region.

== History ==
In historical records the village was first mentioned in 1252.

== Geography ==
The municipality lies at an altitude of 128 metres (420 ft) and covers an area of 10.24 km^{2} (3.95 sq mi) (2025).

== Population ==
Population statistic (10 years)
Year	1995	2005	2015	2025
Count	1623	1782	2431	3679
Difference		+9.79%	+36.41%	+51.33%

Population statistic
Year	2024	2025
Count	3608	3679
Difference		+1.96%

It has a population of 3679 people (31 December 2025).

=== Ethnicity ===
Census 2021 (1+ %)
Ethnicity	Number	Fraction
Slovak	2689	85.36%
Hungarian	429	13.61%
Not found out	145	4.6%
Total	3150	

In year 2021 was 3150 people by ethnicity 2689 as Slovak, 429 as Hungarian, 145 as Not found out, 23 as Czech, 17 as Rusyn, 17 as Other, 7 as German, 5 as Ukrainian, 5 as Russian, 2 as Italian, 2 as English, 1 as Turkish, 1 as Romanian, 1 as Moravian, 1 as Bulgarian and 1 as Albanian.

Note on population: The difference values of population numbers in the table "Population statistic" and in the sections "Ethnicity" & "Religion" is caused by the use of various statistical methods.

=== Religion ===
Census 2021 (1+ %)
Religion	Number	Fraction
Roman Catholic Church	1829	58.06%
None	926	29.4%
Not found out	146	4.63%
Evangelical Church	90	2.86%
Greek Catholic Church	52	1.65%
Total	3150	

In year 2021 was 3150 people by religion 1829 from Roman Catholic Church, 926 from None, 146 from Not found out, 90 from Evangelical Church, 52 from Greek Catholic Church, 26 from Ad hoc movements, 16 from Christian Congregations in Slovakia, 14 from Eastern Orthodox Church, 14 from Other, 12 from Calvinist Church, 7 from Other and not ascertained christian church, 6 from Buddhism, 4 from Church of the Brethren, 4 from Baptists Church, 2 from Paganism and natural spirituality, 1 from Jehovah's Witnesses and 1 from Islam.

== External links/Sources ==
Media related to Nová Dedinka at Wikimedia Commons

- Official page
- http://www.statistics.sk/mosmis/eng/run.html
