= Nový Svet =

Nový Svet Újvilágmajor
- Municipality
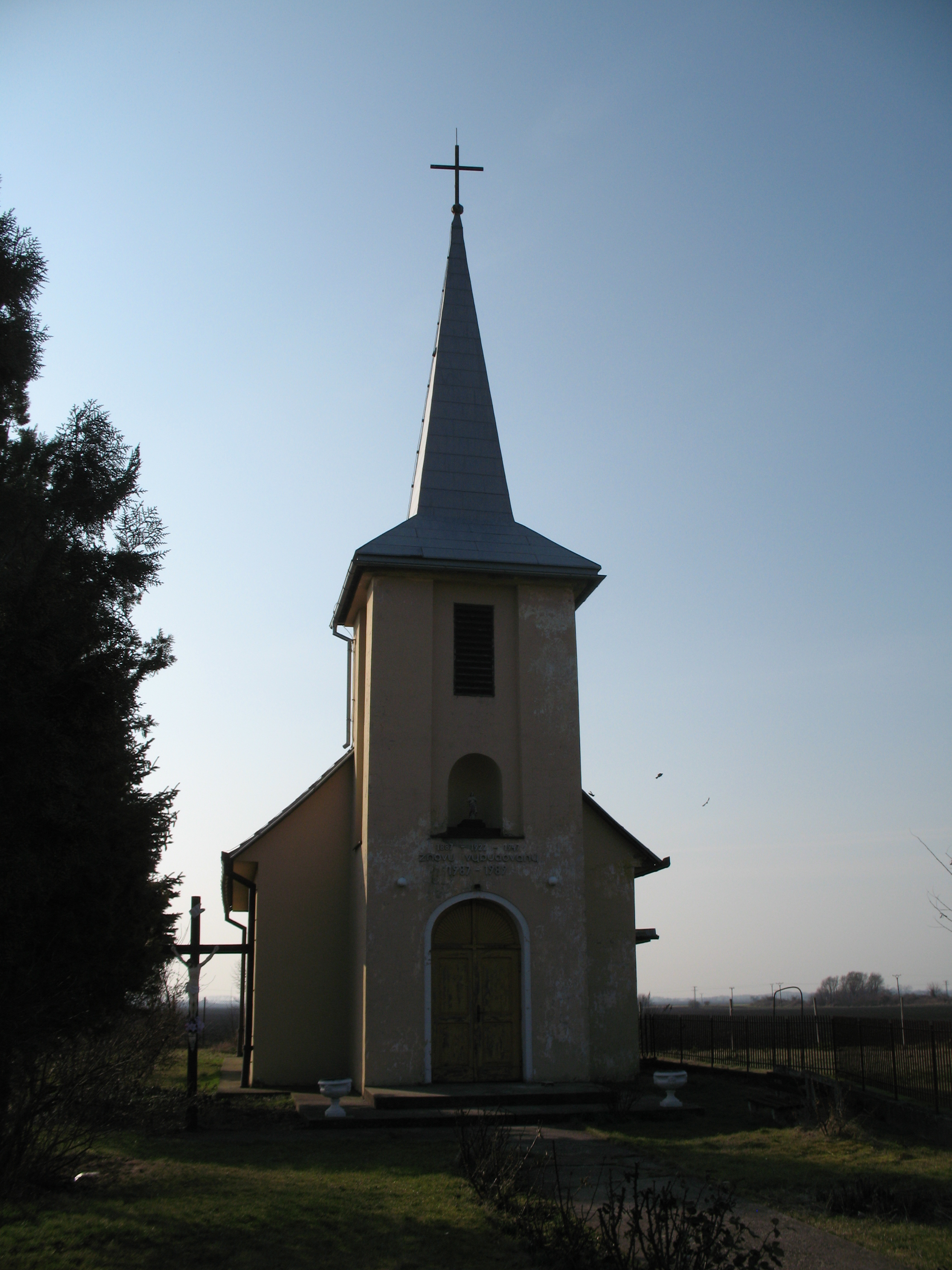

- Flag

- Location of Nový Svet in the Bratislava Region Location of Nový Svet in Slovakia
- Coordinates: 48.21°N 17.48°E
- Country: Slovakia
- Region: Bratislava Region
- District: Senec District
- First mentioned: 1871

Area
  - Total: 0.00 km^{2} (0 sq mi)
- Elevation: 123 m (404 ft)

Population (2025)
  - Total: 102
- Time zone: UTC+1 (CET)
  - Summer (DST): UTC+2 (CEST)
- Postal code: 925 26
- Area code: +421 28
- Vehicle registration plate (until 2022): SC
- Website: www.obecnovysvet.sk

Nový Svet (Hungarian: Újvilágmajor) is a village and municipality in western Slovakia in Senec District in the Bratislava Region.

== History ==
In historical records the village was first mentioned in 1871.

== Geography ==
The municipality lies at an altitude of 123 metres (404 ft) and covers an area of 0.00 km^{2} (0 sq mi) (2025).

== Population ==
Population statistic (10 years)
Year	1995	2005	2015	2025
Count	0	59	94	102
Difference		–	+59.32%	+8.51%

Population statistic
Year	2024	2025
Count	101	102
Difference		+0.99%

It has a population of 102 people (31 December 2025).

=== Ethnicity ===
Census 2021 (1+ %)
Ethnicity	Number	Fraction
Slovak	80	86.95%
Not found out	8	8.69%
Hungarian	4	4.34%
Romani	1	1.08%
Other	1	1.08%
Total	92	

In year 2021 was 92 people by ethnicity 80 as Slovak, 8 as Not found out, 4 as Hungarian, 1 as Romani and 1 as Other.

Note on population: The difference values of population numbers in the table "Population statistic" and in the sections "Ethnicity" & "Religion" is caused by the use of various statistical methods.

=== Religion ===
Census 2021 (1+ %)
Religion	Number	Fraction
Evangelical Church	32	34.78%
None	27	29.35%
Roman Catholic Church	21	22.83%
Not found out	11	11.96%
Calvinist Church	1	1.09%
Total	92	

In year 2021 was 92 people by religion 32 from Evangelical Church, 27 from None, 21 from Roman Catholic Church, 11 from Not found out and 1 from Calvinist Church.

== External links/Sources ==
- Official website
- https://web.archive.org/web/20070513023228/http://www.statistics.sk/mosmis/eng/run.html
