= Kráľová pri Senci =

Kráľová pri Senci Királyfa
- Municipality
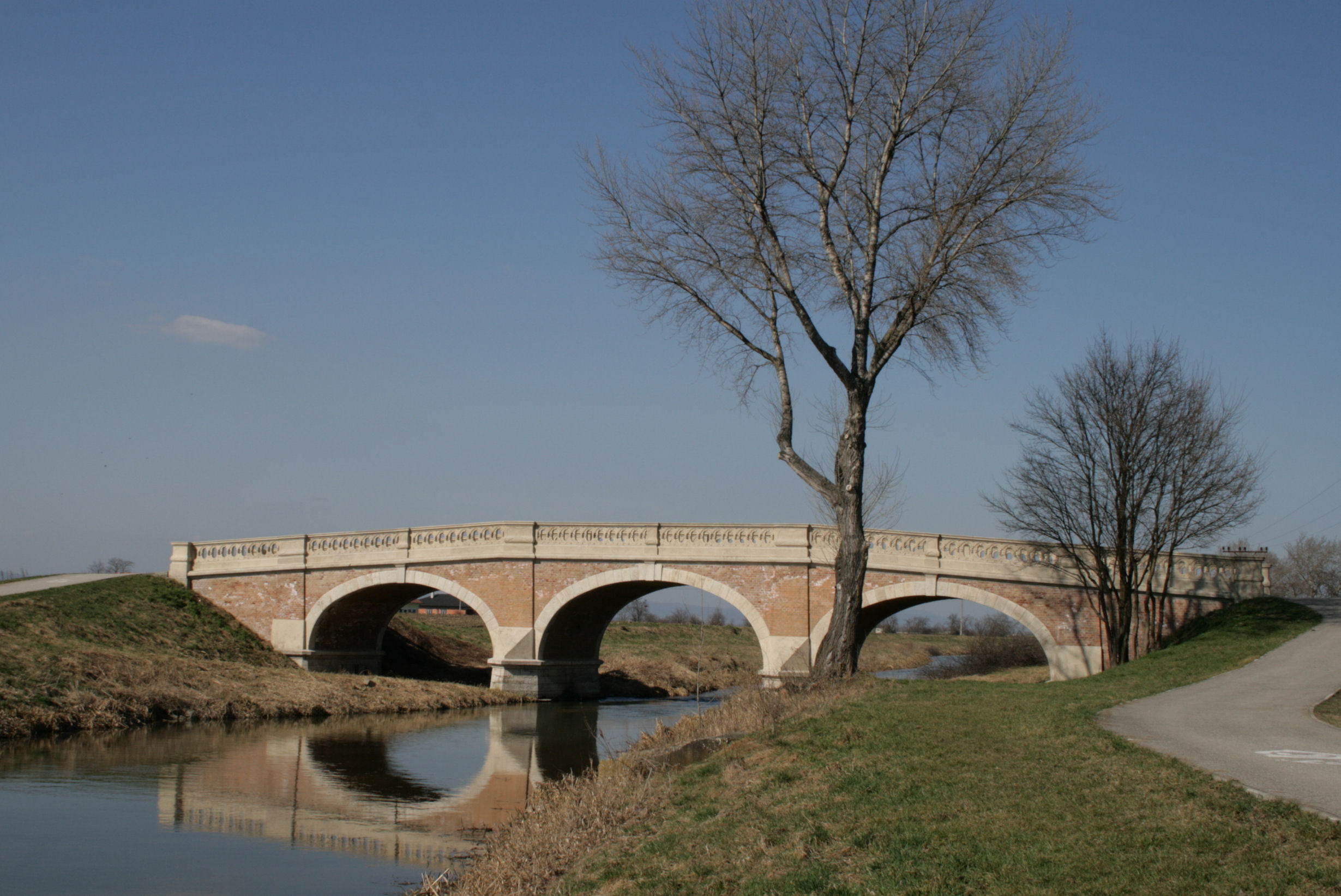
- "Baroque" bridge in Kráľová pri Senci.

- Flag

- Location of Kráľová pri Senci in the Bratislava Region Location of Kráľová pri Senci in Slovakia
- Coordinates: 48.20°N 17.45°E
- Country: Slovakia
- Region: Bratislava Region
- District: Senec District
- First mentioned: 1355

Area
  - Total: 20.65 km^{2} (7.97 sq mi)
- Elevation: 124 m (407 ft)

Population (2025)
  - Total: 2,279
- Time zone: UTC+1 (CET)
  - Summer (DST): UTC+2 (CEST)
- Postal code: 900 50
- Area code: +421 9
- Vehicle registration plate (until 2022): SC
- Website: www.kralovaprisenci.sk

Kráľová pri Senci (Hungarian: Királyfa, meaning King Tree) is a village and municipality in western Slovakia in Senec District in the Bratislava Region.

== History ==
The village was first mentioned in 1363, it was royal property, hence probably the name. The most significant landmark of village is secession bridge over the river Čierna voda, which was built in 1904 and it imitates baroque architecture.

== Geography ==
The municipality lies at an altitude of 124 metres (407 ft) and covers an area of 20.65 km^{2} (7.97 sq mi) (2025).

== Population ==
Population statistic (10 years)
Year	1995	2005	2015	2025
Count	1383	1446	1845	2279
Difference		+4.55%	+27.59%	+23.52%

Population statistic
Year	2024	2025
Count	2308	2279
Difference		−1.25%

It has a population of 2279 people (31 December 2025).

=== Ethnicity ===
Census 2021 (1+ %)
Ethnicity	Number	Fraction
Slovak	1978	88.58%
Not found out	164	7.34%
Hungarian	83	3.71%
Total	2233	

In year 2021 was 2233 people by ethnicity 1978 as Slovak, 164 as Not found out, 83 as Hungarian, 17 as Czech, 11 as German, 9 as Ukrainian, 5 as Rusyn, 5 as Other, 3 as Irish, 3 as Russian, 3 as English, 2 as Serbian, 2 as Croatian, 1 as Romani, 1 as Romanian and 1 as Polish.

Note on population: The difference values of population numbers in the table "Population statistic" and in the sections "Ethnicity" & "Religion" is caused by the use of various statistical methods.

=== Religion ===
Census 2021 (1+ %)
Religion	Number	Fraction
Roman Catholic Church	1257	56.29%
None	642	28.75%
Not found out	169	7.57%
Evangelical Church	80	3.58%
Other	24	1.07%
Total	2233	

In year 2021 was 2233 people by religion 1257 from Roman Catholic Church, 642 from None, 169 from Not found out, 80 from Evangelical Church, 24 from Other, 21 from Greek Catholic Church, 8 from Calvinist Church, 8 from Eastern Orthodox Church, 8 from Ad hoc movements, 5 from Christian Congregations in Slovakia, 4 from Baptists Church, 2 from Other and not ascertained christian church, 2 from Buddhism, 1 from Islam, 1 from Church of the Brethren and 1 from Apostolic Church.
