= Senec District =

Coordinates: 48°13′15″N 17°23′55″E

- District
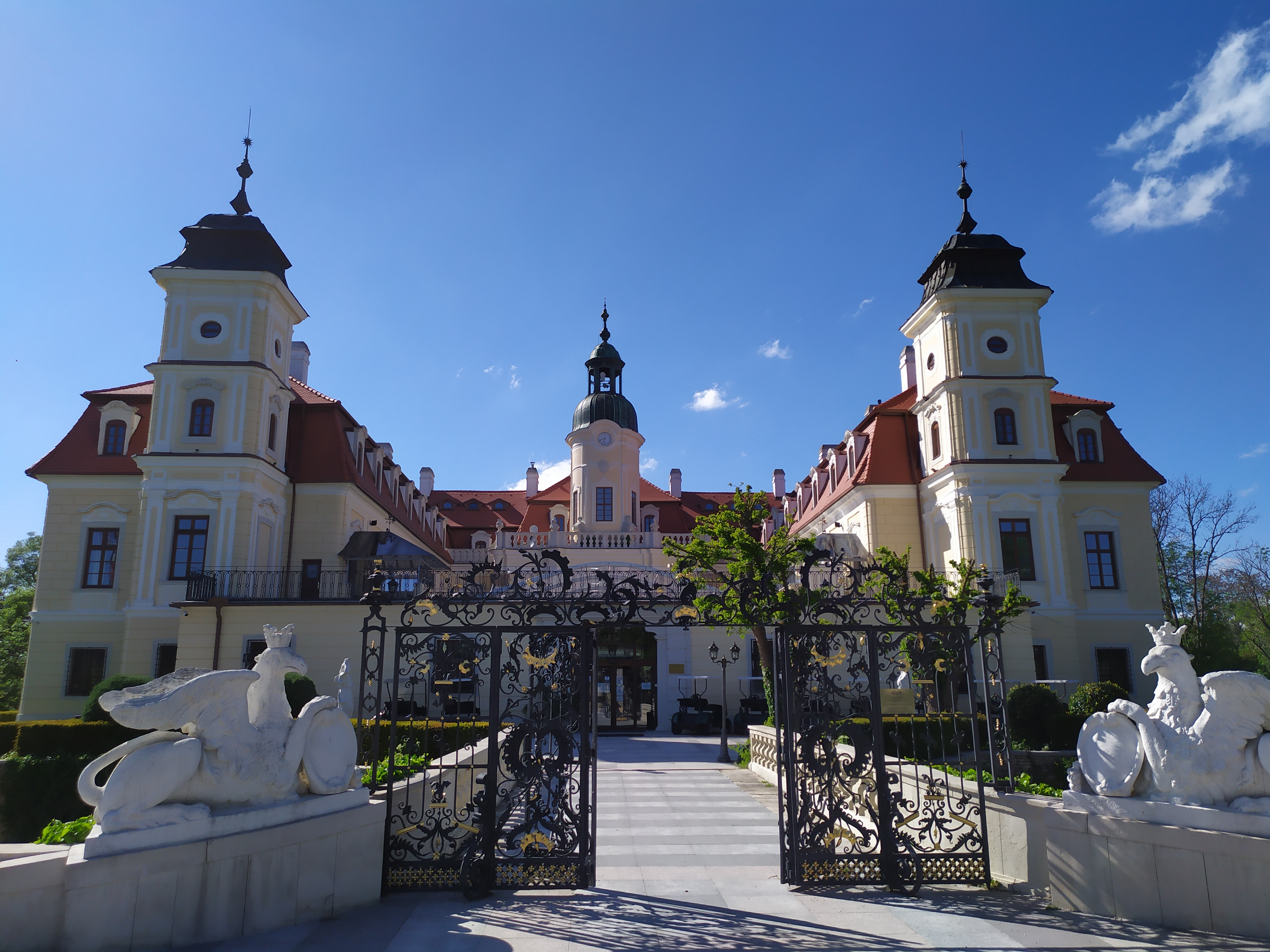
- Country: Slovakia
- Region (kraj): Bratislava Region
- Seat: Senec

Area
  - Total: 359.88 km^{2} (138.95 sq mi)

Population (2025)
  - Total: 108,313
- Time zone: UTC+1 (CET)
  - Summer (DST): UTC+2 (CEST)
- Telephone prefix: 02
- Vehicle registration plate (until 2022): SC
- Municipalities: 29

Senec District (okres Senec) is a district in the Bratislava Region of western Slovakia. It was established in 1996. The district is largely a bedroom community for Bratislava and is also known for its recreational possibilities, foremost the area of Slnečné jazerá (Sunny Lakes). The administrative seat is its largest town, Senec. The whole district contains 34 623 free-standing houses.

Historical population
Year	Pop.	±%
1970	46,396	—
1980	49,473	+6.6%
1991	49,871	+0.8%
2001	51,825	+3.9%
2011	66,265	+27.9%
2021	96,715	+46.0%
Source: Censuses

== Population ==
Population statistic (10 years)
Year	1995	2005	2015	2025
Count	50,220	55,948	77,888	108,313
Difference		+11.40%	+39.21%	+39.06%

Population statistic
Year	2024	2025
Count	106,951	108,313
Difference		+1.27%

It has a population of 108,313 people (31 December 2025).

=== Ethnicity ===
Census 2021 (1+ %)
Ethnicity	Number	Fraction
Slovak	80,826	80%
Hungarian	9705	9.6%
Not found out	6291	6.22%
Total	101,022	

In year 2021 was 101,022 people by ethnicity 80,826 as Slovak, 9705 as Hungarian, 6291 as Not found out, 994 as Czech, 713 as Other, 420 as Rusyn, 366 as Ukrainian, 238 as Russian, 227 as German, 154 as Romani, 125 as Vietnamese, 122 as Croatian, 109 as Polish, 106 as Romanian, 89 as Serbian, 79 as Italian, 59 as Austrian, 57 as Bulgarian, 47 as Jewish, 42 as Albanian, 41 as French, 39 as Moravian, 38 as Chinese, 36 as English, 33 as Greek, 19 as Turkish, 15 as Irish, 15 as Korean, 15 as Canadian, 1 as Silesian and 1 as Iranian.

Note on population: The difference values of population numbers in the table "Population statistic" and in the sections "Ethnicity" & "Religion" is caused by the use of various statistical methods.

=== Religion ===
Census 2021 (1+ %)
Religion	Number	Fraction
Roman Catholic Church	47,892	49.52%
None	32,983	34.1%
Not found out	6190	6.4%
Evangelical Church	4258	4.4%
Greek Catholic Church	1243	1.29%
Total	96,715	

In year 2021 was 96,715 people by religion 47,892 from Roman Catholic Church, 32,983 from None, 6190 from Not found out, 4258 from Evangelical Church, 1243 from Greek Catholic Church, 667 from Calvinist Church, 563 from Eastern Orthodox Church, 426 from Ad hoc movements, 415 from Other, 320 from Baptists Church, 319 from Christian Congregations in Slovakia, 237 from Other and not ascertained christian church, 220 from Apostolic Church, 205 from Buddhism, 180 from Jehovah's Witnesses, 167 from Islam, 90 from Paganism and natural spirituality, 85 from United Methodist Church, 57 from Jewish community, 55 from Church of the Brethren, 53 from Seventh-day Adventist Church, 32 from Old Catholic Church, 28 from Hinduism, 13 from Czechoslovak Hussite Church, 9 from Bahá'i Community, 7 from Church of Jesus Christ of Latter-day Saints and 1 from New Apostolic Church.

== Municipalities ==
Municipality	Area [km^{2}]	Population
Bernolákovo	28.43	10,296
Blatné	16.32	1,788
Boldog	4.49	538
Čataj	12.86	1,177
Dunajská Lužná	26.95	8,123
Hamuliakovo	10.94	3,080
Hrubá Borša	5.84	1,792
Hrubý Šúr	6.20	1,130
Hurbanova Ves	5.41	708
Chorvátsky Grob	15.11	8,047
Igram	8.30	564
Ivanka pri Dunaji	14.25	7,274
Kalinkovo	12.91	1,574
Kaplna	5.52	955
Kostolná pri Dunaji	8.07	936
Kráľová pri Senci	20.65	2,279
Malinovo	8.82	4,201
Miloslavov	10.19	7,005
Most pri Bratislave	19.01	4,608
Nová Dedinka	10.24	3,679
Nový Svet	0.00	102
Reca	17.66	1,727
Rovinka	8.85	6,528
Senec	38.71	20,260
Tomášov	19.82	2,851
Tureň	5.30	1,303
Veľký Biel	10.16	3,074
Vlky	3.62	417
Zálesie	5.86	2,297

Population and area values are current for year 2025.
