= 1938 deportation of Jews from Slovakia =

From 4 to 7 November 1938, thousands of Jews were deported from Slovakia to the no-man's land on the Slovak−Hungarian border. Following Hungarian territorial gains in the First Vienna Award on 2 November, Slovak Jews were accused of favoring Hungary in the dispute. With the help of Adolf Eichmann, Slovak People's Party leaders planned the deportation, which was carried out by local police and the Hlinka Guard. Conflicting orders were issued to target either Jews who were poor or those who lacked Slovak citizenship, resulting in chaos.

Many of the deportees managed to return home within a few days, but more than 800 were left in tent camps near Miloslavov, Veľký Kýr, and Šamorín in the no man's land along the border for months with some groups staying until January or February 1939. Another several hundred Jews were deported from Hungary to the no man's land. In the meantime they endured winter weather with little or no shelter, although they were helped by Jewish organizations in Bratislava. The deportations were a fiasco for the Slovak People's Party leadership, worsening the country's reputation abroad and causing capital flight by frightened Jews who intended to emigrate, but they were a preparation for the 1942 deportations to the ghettos and extermination camps in German-occupied Poland.

== Background ==
Following the Munich Agreement, in which the Czechoslovak Sudetenland was annexed by Nazi Germany, the Slovak People's Party (HSĽS)—long in favor of Slovak autonomy or independence—unilaterally announced Slovakia's autonomy within the Second Czechoslovak Republic. HSĽS was an ethnonationalist party which had a paramilitary wing, the Hlinka Guard. The pro-Nazi German Party, for Slovak Germans, also had a paramilitary wing, the Freiwillige Schutzstaffel. Jozef Tiso, a Catholic priest and HSĽS leader, became prime minister of the Slovak autonomous region and under Tiso's leadership, the Slovak government opened negotiations in Komárno with Hungary regarding their border. The dispute was submitted to arbitration in Vienna by Nazi Germany and Fascist Italy. Hungary was awarded land in southern Slovakia on 2 November 1938, including 40 percent of Slovakia's arable land and 270,000 people who had declared Czechoslovak ethnicity. On 1 November, several Jews were arrested at a pro-Hungarian demonstration at the Carlton Hotel in Bratislava, agitating for the city to be annexed by Hungary. This exacerbated the previous antisemitic sentiment of the HSĽS and provided a pretext for actions against Slovak Jews.

== Planning ==
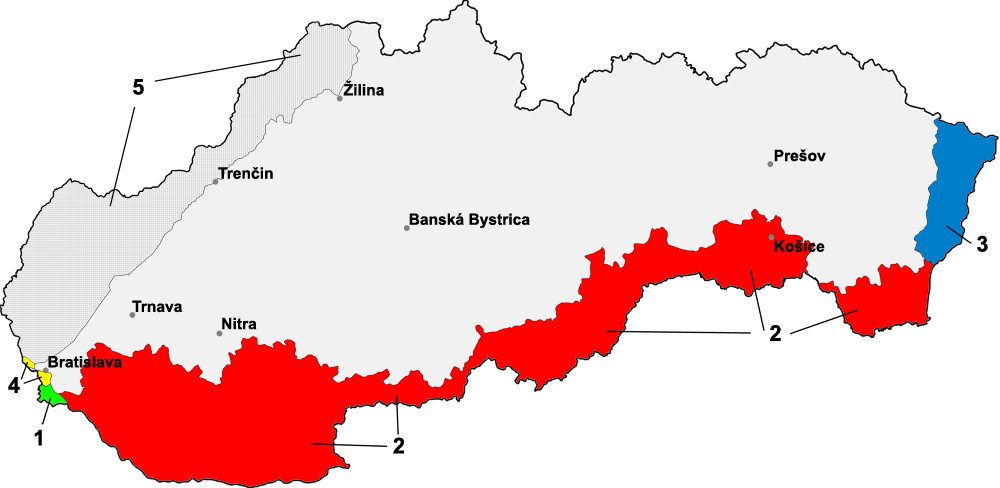
The territory in red was annexed to the Kingdom of Hungary in November 1938.

On 3 November, SS official Adolf Eichmann met with several radical politicians—including Jozef Faláth of the HSĽS; leader of the Academic Hlinka Guard, Jozef Kirschbaum; Julius Janek, a local Hlinka Guard commander; Konrad Goldbach, a correspondent of the Nazi newspaper Völkischer Beobachter; and German Party leader Franz Karmasin—at the Carlton Hotel. Faláth drafted a plan to deport impoverished and foreign Jews to the ceded territory, which was approved by Tiso on 4 November. The plan probably had the knowledge and approval of Ferdinand Ďurčanský and Alexander Mach.

Around noon that day, Faláth went to the police headquarters in Bratislava and phoned police departments across the country, ordering them to carry out a joint operation with the Hlinka Guard. Before midnight, the police and guardsmen were to physically remove all Jews "without material means" to the territory that would be ceded to Hungary, in order to effect a "quick solution to the Jewish problem in Slovakia". (Note: Slovak: rýchl[e] vyriešeni[e] židovského problému na Slovensku) Deportees were to have their property locked up and were provided only 50 Czechoslovak koruna (Kčs) worth of food. A few hours later, the orders were changed to target foreign Jews instead. Jews from Carpathian Ruthenia or the Czech lands were to be forcibly returned to their place of origin. The contradictory orders increased the chaos and confusion that accompanied the deportation. According to Czech historian Michal Frankl, the organizers of the deportation were inspired by the recent expulsion of Polish Jews from Germany in late October, of which Eichmann was certainly aware, in which thousands of Polish Jews were deported from Germany and rejected by Poland.

== Deportation ==
Source	Number of deportees
Bánovce nad Bebravou	62
Banská Štiavnica	52
Bardejov	110
Bratislava	260
Giraltovce	69
Hlohovec	101
Humenné	123
Kežmarok	237
Michalovce	292
Nitra	205
Nové Mesto nad Váhom	76
Piešťany	101
Poprad	228
Prešov	197
Sabinov	143
Snina	99
Spišská Stará Ves	95
Sobrance	102
Topoľčany	67
Trenčín	84
Žilina	106
Zlaté Moravce	83
From Nižňansky & Slneková 1998, p. 50. Omits the figure of 4,000 Jews from Bratislava district and numbers less than 50.

From 4 to 7 November, between 4,000 and 7,600 Jews (Note: Higher estimates rely on a figure of 4,000 Jews deported from Bratislava district (see Nižňansky & Slneková 1998, p. 50), which Michal Frankl considers an exaggeration; the Bratislava police only recorded 260 deportees. Frankl's estimate is about 4,000 deportees total.) were deported, in a chaotic, pogrom-like operation in which Hlinka Guard, Freiwillige Schutzstaffel, and the German Party participated. The victims were rounded up, loaded onto buses, and dropped off past the new border. About 260 were foreigners, such as Austrian Jews who had escaped into Czechoslovakia following the Anschluss. The bulk of the deportees were Jews with Polish citizenship, who were effectively stateless because they had been stripped of their Polish nationality while living abroad. Young children, the elderly, and pregnant women were among those deported. Deportees faced bullying and intimidation from the Hlinka Guard and were warned that their presence in Slovakia was undesired and that they would face criminal charges if they attempted to return.

However, most of the deportees—not just Slovak Jews, but also Polish citizens and stateless people—ignored the warning and made their way back home, which was unauthorized but quietly tolerated. In many places, the Hlinka Guard's zeal was such that they continued the action after the order was rescinded; the Jews of Vranov nad Topľou were expelled on 7 November. Four Jews who tried to return to Banská Bystrica were deported again, but 70% of the 292 Jews deported from Michalovce had returned by 19 November.

Meanwhile, Jews with a net worth of over 500,000 Kčs were arrested to prevent capital flight. Jews with foreign citizenship, except German, Hungarian and Romanian nationality (who comprised most of the Jews with foreign citizenship in Slovakia at the time) were exempt from deportation. The arrests did not prevent a spike in capital flight, and Hungary refused to admit the deported Jews, so Tiso canceled the operation on 7 November 1938.

== Detention ==
Deportees were confined in makeshift tent camps at Miloslavov (Hungarian: Annamajor, German: Michsdorf, near Bratislava) and Veľký Kýr (Nyitranagykér, near Nitra) on the new Slovak–Hungarian border during the winter. The camps were located in the neutral zone of 3 kilometres (1.9 mi) between the countries; there was an additional 1.5 kilometres (0.93 mi) demilitarized zone on the Slovak side. Neither country accepted responsibility for them or guarded them, blaming the other country for the situation. Miloslavov was located on a road near Štvrtok na Ostrove (Csütörtök), 250 metres (820 ft) from the new border. At both camps, there were initially no shelters, and especially children and elderly fell ill due to the wet winter weather. At Miloslavov, the temperatures for the first week got as low as −5 °C (23 °F) before the deportees obtained any shelters.

Heinrich Schwartz, a representative of the Orthodox Religious Communities, and Marie Schmolka, director of HICEM Prague, were allowed to visit Miloslavov in late November. With the aid of Jewish organizations, the refugees obtained food, shelter, and more clothing. According to a 29 November letter from the president of Orthodox Religious Communities, the population of Veľký Kýr was 344, consisting of 132 men, 73 women, and 139 children and Miloslavov had more than 300, including 120 men, 77 women, and 105 children. Of the detainees at Miloslavov, 197 were stateless, although many of these had lived in the country for many years. Seven of the deportees had Slovak citizenship, thirty were from Carpathian Ruthenia, 28 originated in the local area, 22 were from Poland, and 38 from Germany. Another camp, at Šamorín, had 190 people: 108 men, 40 women and 42 children.

In the letter, the community leader begged for the Slovak Jews to be allowed to go home and the other Jews to be released so that they could wind up their affairs and leave the country. He promised that the Jews not from Slovakia would live in centers or with relatives and that all expenses would be borne by the Orthodox community. At the same time, local officials worried that the tent camps would become a haven for infectious diseases, which could spread to neighboring Slovak communities. On 30 November, a quarantine was imposed in Miloslavov, which also prevented aid from Jewish organizations in Bratislava. The poor conditions in the camps were condemned by the United Kingdom and France and worsened Slovakia's image abroad.

== Aftermath and effects ==
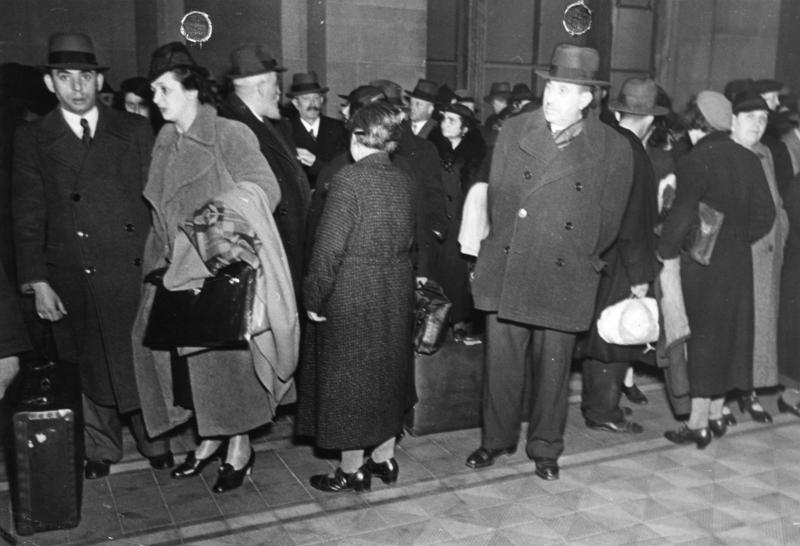
Polish Jews expelled from Nuremberg

By early December, the Hungarian authorities also expelled several hundred Jews with foreign citizenship, although Czechoslovak Jews from southern Slovakia were de facto treated as Hungarian citizens. On 8 December, Slovak authorities issued another order that the deportation of Jews would not be done en masse but on a case-by-case basis and in line with Czechoslovak law. Jews from other countries (such as Poland or the Czech lands) were to be returned home, while stateless Jews were imprisoned in camps along the border. Although these orders did not say so explicitly, they implied that most of the deported Jews with Czechoslovak citizenship would be allowed to return home. After this, the remaining deportees were mostly stateless. At Veľký Kýr this was implemented beginning 12 December. On 19 December, 118 deportees at Miloslavov were moved to Kühmeyer Inn on the outskirts of Bratislava (in the Červený Most area) and from there to a former ammunition factory in Patrónka, where they remained (according to Aron Grünhut) until the 1942 deportations. According to Slovak National Archives documents, many of the Jews in Miloslavov were able to emigrate and the rest were deported overnight to Hungary in January 1939, in order to minimize publicity. On 21 February 1939, 158 Jews were released from Veľký Kýr, but it is unclear when the camp was shut down.

Along with Germany's expulsion of Polish Jews in October and Hungary's expulsion of Jews from the areas it annexed in 1938, the Slovak deportations were the first in central Europe. There were also expulsions after the Anschluss, the annexation of the Sudetenland, and Kristallnacht. Frightened, many Slovak Jews tried to transfer their property abroad and attempt emigration. Over the winter, many refugee Jews from Germany and Austria managed to leave the country. Between December 1938 and February 1939, more than 2.25 million Kčs were transferred illegally to the Czech lands, the Netherlands, and the United Kingdom; additional amounts were transferred legally. The deportations reduced British investment, increasing dependence on German capital. They also served as a rehearsal for the 1942 deportations, in which two-thirds of Slovak Jews were deported to ghettos and extermination camps in occupied Poland.

== Interpretations ==
In Slovak historiography, the deportations are presented as the result of the cynical opportunism of the HSĽS leadership, which sought to scapegoat Jews for its own foreign policy failure. American historian James Mace Ward argues that the role of Hungary–Slovakia relations in the deportation have been ignored in the literature. According to Ward, the main cause of the deportation was that Slovak Jews were perceived as a security threat and loyal to the enemy by both the Hungarian and Slovak sides of the dispute. Michal Frankl commented that the deportation of poor Jews and arrest of wealthy ones reflected two streams of antisemitism that portrayed Jews as foreign and poor Ostjuden on the one hand and as wealthy economic exploiters of Slovaks on the other.
