= Henryk Rolirad =

Polish food-systems engineer

Henryk Rolirad (11 April 1909 – 4 January 1984) was a Polish food–systems engineer who was recognized as a Righteous among the Nations for saving Jews during World War II.

== Early life ==
Henryk Rolirad was born in Poznań, Poland, and was adopted at age two by Stanisław and Stefania Rolirad. He graduated from Poznań's University of Economics. He first worked at a local Crafts Chamber, then as director of the Poznań branch of the Polish travel agency Orbis. In 1938 Rolirad formed an Orbis bureau in Zbąszyń.

== World War II ==
In 1938 Nazi Germany deported many Polish–Jewish emigres back to their native Poland. Even before World War II had begun, Henryk Rolirad was assisting these emigres arriving in the transit town of Zbąszyń.

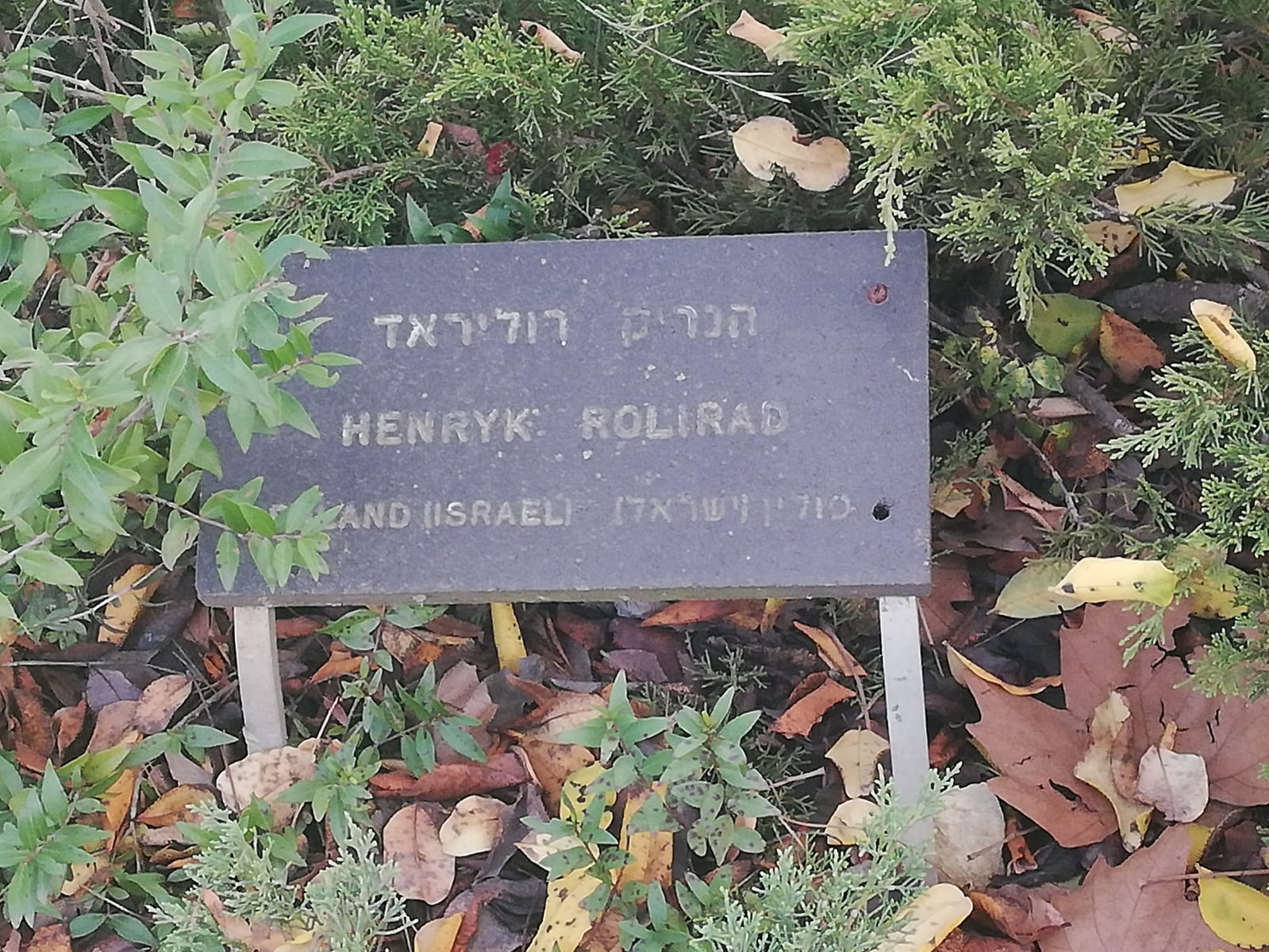
Plaque at Yad Vashem, in Jerusalem, honoring Henryk Rolirad

During the German occupation of Poland, Rolirad was a member of the Polish Home Army's Security Corps and, in that capacity, worked with the Jewish Military Union (Żydowski Związek Wojskowy) active in the Warsaw Ghetto. Rolirad supplied the Jews with food, medicines, and forged documents, inside as well as outside the Ghetto, and made his own home available as a temporary refuge for Jews escaping the Ghetto. He also rented at least three other houses in which to hide Jews.

On 23 April 1943, as he sheltered Jews in one of his houses, Rolirad was captured by the German Gestapo. In German-occupied Poland, the penalty for helping Jews was death. The Gestapo placed Rolirad and two Jewish women into a truck. During transit, the truck stopped at an intersection, and the Gestapo man left the truck to enter a nearby house, leaving behind only two guards. A member of the Polish underground resistance, unable to see who was inside the truck, tossed in a hand grenade. Rolirad was seriously injured and remained disabled to the end of his life.

In 1944 Rolirad met Maria Einstein, both originally from Poznań. They had become acquainted earlier while helping Jews in Zbąszyń. Rolirad looked after Maria Einstein, saving her life.

== Postwar ==
After the war, Rolirad married Maria Einstein. In 1965 they emigrated with their daughters to Israel, living at Ramat Gan.

Rolirad died on 4 January 1984, of a malignant illness. He was interred at the Jaffa Catholic Cemetery in Tel Aviv.

== Recognition ==
On 18 October 1966 Yad Vashem, in Jerusalem, recognized Henryk Rolirad as a Righteous among the Nations.

== See also ==
- Rescue of Jews by Poles during the Holocaust
- Home Army
- List of Righteous among the Nations by country
