= Stefan Garczyński (1690–1756) =

Polish noble

Stefan Garczyński (1690 – 24 September 1756^{1}), voivode of Poznań, writer in the Polish–Lithuanian Commonwealth. Owner of Zbąszyń.. He was one of the first to be made a knight of the Order of the White Eagle.

Son of Damian Garczyński. Father of Franciszek Garczyńsk, Stefan Garczyński and Edward Garczyński.

== Works ==
- Anatomia Rzeczypospolitey Polskiej (1749) is his most famous work, where he argued for the need of economic reforms and against the mercantilism economic system. He was also in favour of the better treatment of peasants and abolition of serfdom, opposed the abuse of liberum veto. He tried to carry out some economic reforms in his own estate.

== Quotes ==
- "If more effort would be put to educating children, the country would be better and wealthier"
  - Gdyby miano większe staranie w edukacyi dzieci, byłby kraj obfitszy i bogatszy"!
- "All good qualities that can exist under the sun are based on justice"
  - Wszystkie cnoty, które tylko pod słońcem być mogą, najwięcej funduja się na sprawiedliwości.
- "It's easiest to cheat those most loving. [And it's] the worst."
  - Najłatwiej oszukiwać najbardziej kochających. I najpodlej
- "A smile and good humor are signs that you dominate your fate."
  - Uśmiech i humor to znak zwycięskiego górowania nad losem

== Notes ==
^1 Some sources give the date of death as 1755.
