= Zbąszyń =

Town in Greater Poland Voivodeship, Poland

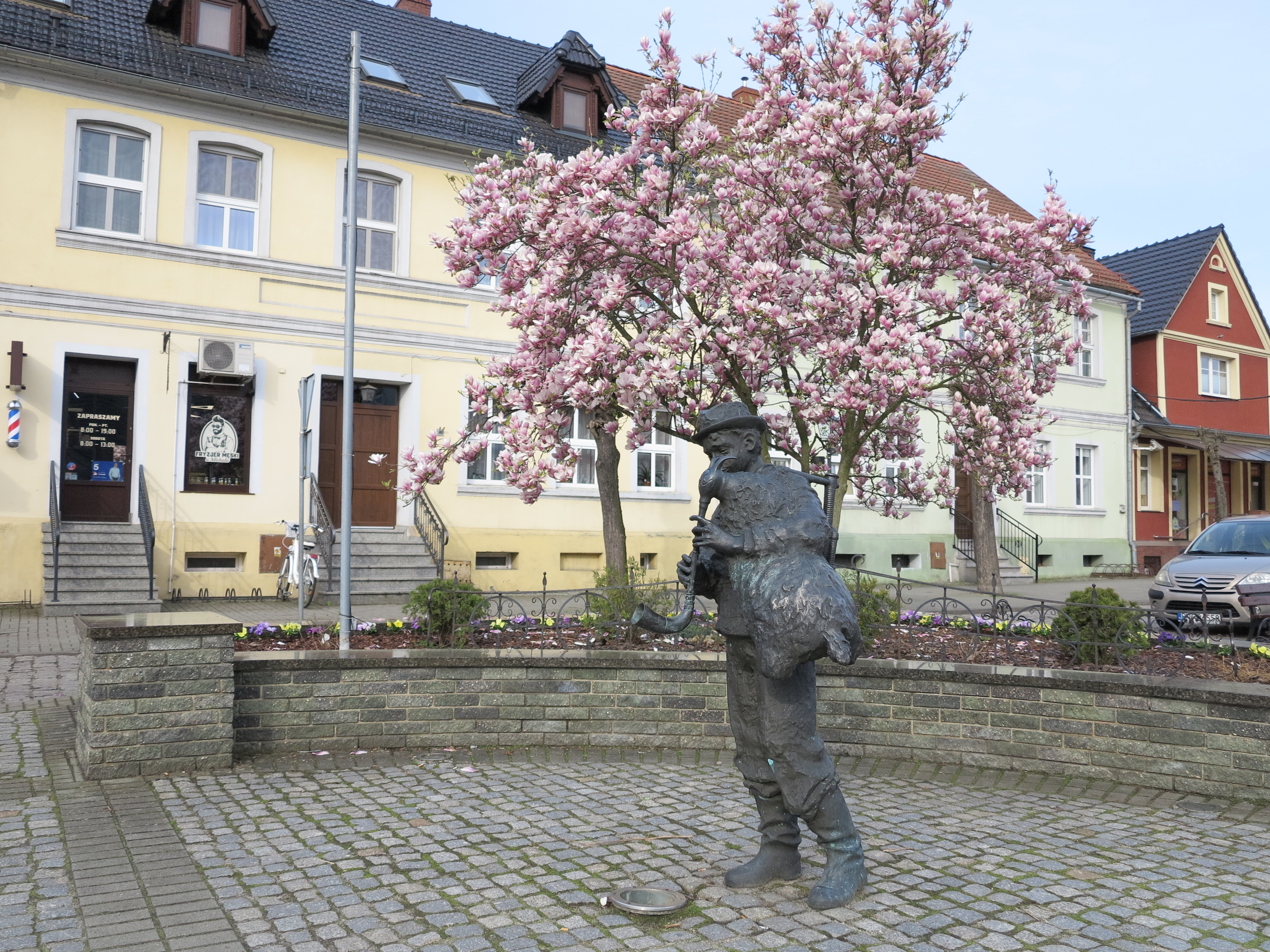
- Rynek (Market Square) in Zbąszyń

- Flag Coat of arms

- Location within Poland
- Coordinates: 52°15′11″N 15°55′4″E
- Country: Poland
- Voivodeship: Greater Poland
- County: Nowy Tomyśl
- Gmina: Zbąszyń
- First mentioned: 1231
- Town rights: before 1311

Area
  - Total: 5.57 km^{2} (2.15 sq mi)

Population (2010)
  - Total: 7,211
  - Density: 1,290/km^{2} (3,350/sq mi)
- Time zone: UTC+1 (CET)
  - Summer (DST): UTC+2 (CEST)
- Postal code: 64-360
- Website: http://www.zbaszyn.pl

Zbąszyń [ˈzbɔ̃ʂɨɲ] is a town in western Poland, in Greater Poland Voivodeship, in Nowy Tomyśl County. It is the administrative seat of Gmina Zbąszyń.

== Geography ==
The town is situated on the Obra river in the Greater Poland historic region, about 75 km (47 mi) west of Poznań. Gmina Zbąszyń is part of the Polish-German Pomerania Euroregion.

== History ==
=== Early history ===
Zbąszyń is part of the region of Greater Poland, considered the cradle of the Polish state. In early Poland, there was a Polish defensive stronghold in Zbąszyń, one of the strongholds that reinforced the defense of the western border in the event of a possible German invasion from the west, located east of the defensive strongholds in the Lubusz Land.

Baroque Church of the Assumption

While the earliest mentions of the settlement date back to 1231, the name Sbansin first appeared in a 1277 deed, issued by Duke Przemysł I of Greater Poland at his Poznań residence. Its citizens received town privileges before 1311, making Zbąszyń one of the oldest towns in Poland. It was held by the Polish monarchs until in 1393 King Władysław II Jagiełło ceded it to his Masovian governor Jan Głowacz Nałęcz. By the early 15th century, Zbąszyń evolved as a centre of the Greater Polish Hussite movement. Zbąszyń was a private town of Polish nobility, administratively located in the Kościan County in the Poznań Voivodeship in the Greater Poland Province of the Kingdom of Poland.

As a result of the Second Partition of Poland in 1793 it became part of the Kingdom of Prussia, under the Germanized name Bentschen and was administered as part of the newly established province of South Prussia. After the successful Greater Poland uprising of 1806, it was regained by the Poles and included within the short-lived Duchy of Warsaw. However in 1815, after the Napoleonic Wars, it was reannexed by Prussia and was part of the Grand Duchy of Posen which later became the Province of Posen. The Frankfurt-Posen railway line, which passed through the town was built in 1870.

In 1871, it became part of the German Empire. Having experienced a strong influx of population from Germany in the 17th century, Bentschen was predominantly German-speaking until 1920. According to the German census of 1890, Bentschen had a population of 3,176, of which 200 (6.3%) were Poles.

=== 20th century ===
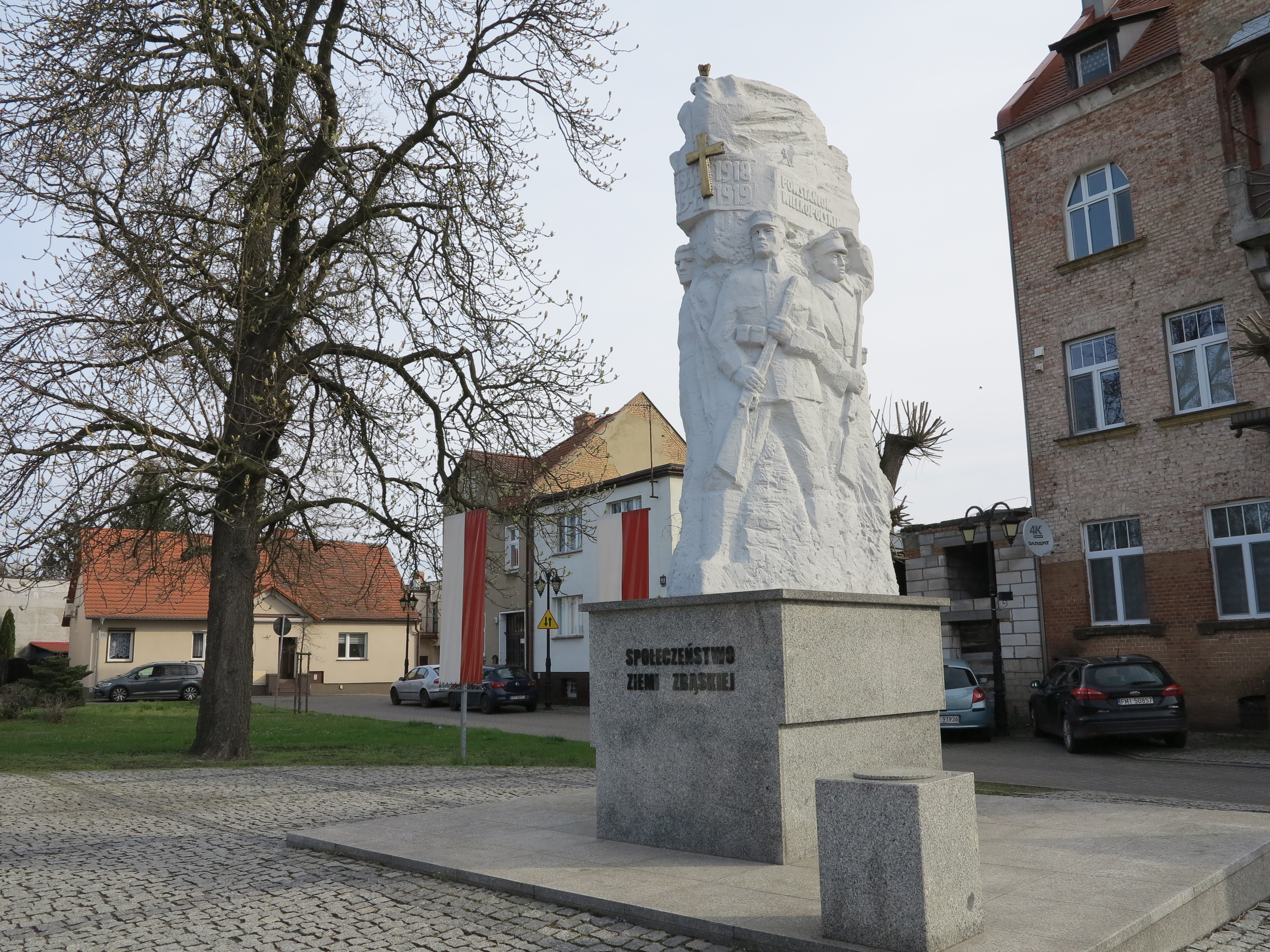
Greater Poland uprising (1918–1919) Monument

After Germany's defeat in World War I, Poland regained independence, and the Greater Poland uprising broke out, which goal was to reunite the region with the reborn Polish state. 42 Polish insurgents died in battle in Zbąszyń. At the local cemetery, there are graves of Polish insurgents who either died in battle, were executed by the Germans in the town, or died in German captivity. The town eventually became part of the Second Polish Republic in 1920, according to the terms of the Treaty of Versailles.

In the interwar period, the town was located on the border with Germany. International trains connecting Paris and Berlin with Warsaw and the Polish-Soviet border at Negoreloe ran through Zbąszyń, and in 1929 a new larger railway station building was erected to enable the handling of heavy traffic and accommodate the necessary offices. In this period, the proportion of Poles increased and in 1938, the population of the town stood at 5,400 which included 360 Germans and 52 Jews.

In October 1938, Nazi Germany decided to expel those German Jews who did not hold German citizenship or had it taken away, and who originally hailed from Poland. The Polenaktion began on October 27, 1938, as the Nazis began arresting Jews of Polish nationality in Germany with the intention of expelling them to Poland. The Nazis took this decision was the issuing of a decree by the Polish Ministry of the Interior on the 6 October 1938 which called for the passports of Polish citizens residing abroad would have to be checked and revalidated. A few days before that decree was to come into force, 17,000 German Jews that were or could be considered to be citizens of Poland were rounded up and unceremoniously dumped on the Polish border in various border towns, including 6,800 in Zbąszyń. The Polish government in turn refused to admit those of them who did not hold valid Polish passports. The Polish authorities hoped that the concentration of large numbers of Jews expelled from Germany near the border would exert pressure on the Germans and induce them to begin negotiations to hasten the return of the Jews back to their former homes. As a result, thousands of Jews were stuck on the border in makeshift facilities for several days or weeks in appalling conditions.

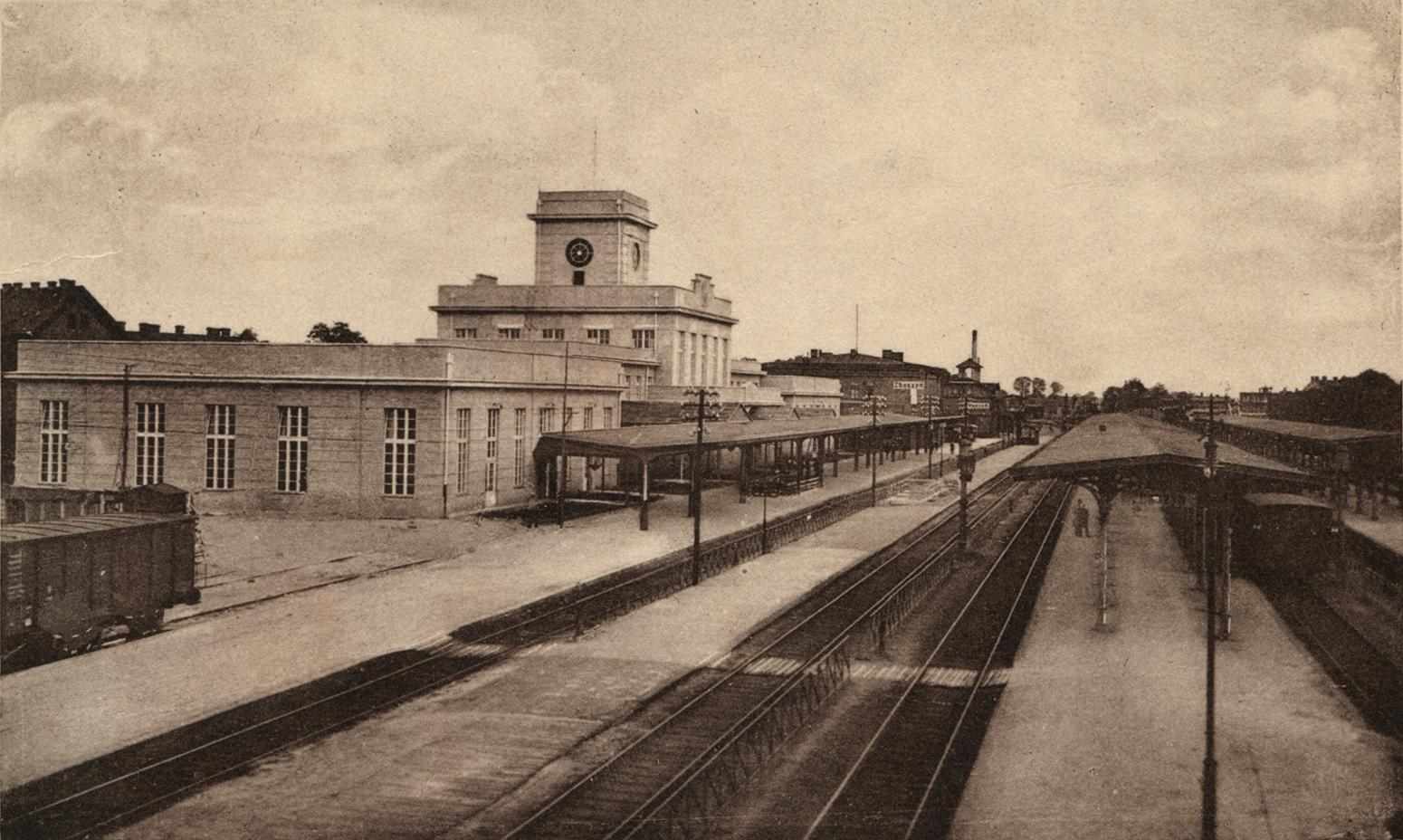
Zbąszyń railway station in the 1930s

During the initial stage, the local inhabitants of Zbąszyń responded to the authorities' appeal and provided the refugees with warm water and some food. On the afternoon of the 30 October 1938, help arrived from Warsaw supplied by Emanuel Ringelblum and Yitzhak Gitterman of the Joint Distribution Committee, who were to form the General Jewish Aid Committee for Jewish Refugees from Germany in Poland, established several days later on the 4 November 1938.

A committee to help the refugees was also set up in Zbąszyń headed by a Jewish flour-mill owner named Grzybowski. The refugees were housed in army barracks and in buildings forming part of the flour mill, and fifteen hundred of them were accommodated in private dwellings. Expenses were met by the aid committee.

The situation generated widespread outrage among the Jewish community in Poland, which conducted extensive efforts to help the internees in any way possible. It also prompted Herschel Grynszpan, a Polish Jew, to assassinate Ernst vom Rath, a German Embassy official in Paris, on November 7, 1938, which in turn provided the Nazis an excuse to carry out Kristallnacht, the anti-semitic pogrom of November 9–10, 1938. Eventually the Polish government finally allowed them, in stages, to enter the country.

Negotiations between the Polish authorities and the Germans came to an end on the 24 January 1939, when an agreement was signed under which the deportees were allowed to return to Germany, in groups not exceeding one hundred at a time, for a limited stay to settle their affairs and liquidate their businesses. The proceeds of such liquidation would have to be deposited in blocked accounts in Germany from which withdrawals were practically impossible.

The Polish government, for its part, enabled the families of the deportees to join them in Poland. These arrangements took until the summer of 1939, and most probably, a small number of refugees were still on their temporary stay in Germany when the Germans invaded Poland on 1 September 1939.

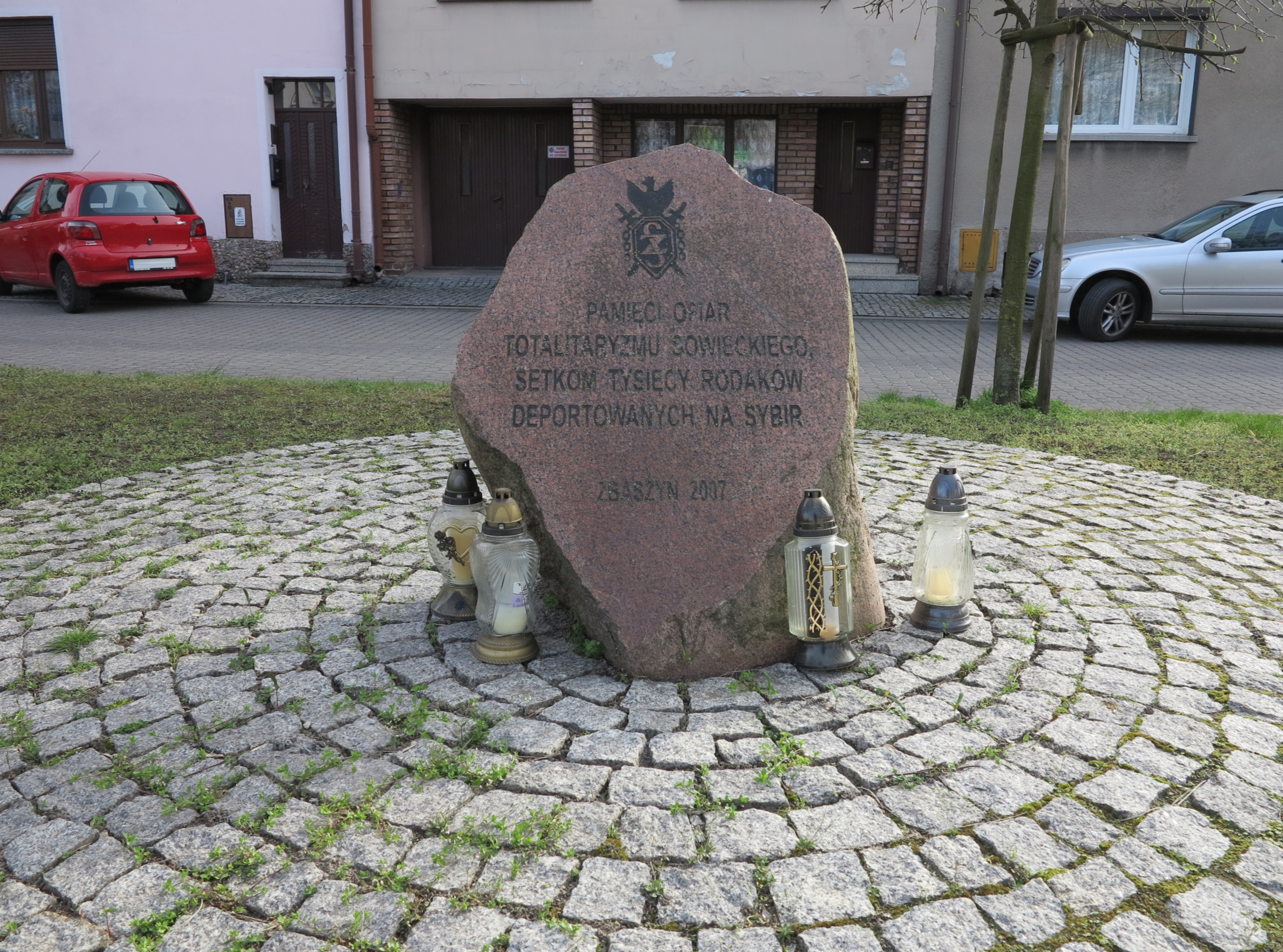
Memorial to Poles deported by the Soviets to Siberia

In 1939, frequent border violations by Germany took place, and on 25 August, Germany halted international rail transport. On 1 September 1939, the day of the German invasion of Poland, which marked the beginning of World War II, at dawn, the Germans invaded the town, which was recaptured by the Poles in the morning, however, it soon fell to Germany. During the German occupation, the Polish population was subjected to various crimes, and in December 1939 the Germans expelled 110 Poles, activists, officials and wealthier residents with entire families, whose homes were then handed over to German colonists as part of the Lebensraum policy. The German Nazis operated a Nazi prison and a forced labour camp for Jews in the town, and destroyed the pre-war monument dedicated to the Polish insurgents of the Greater Poland uprising of 1918–1919. The Polish resistance movement was present in Zbąszyń. The co-founder of the local unit of the Narodowa Organizacja Bojowa resistance organization, was arrested by the Germans in 1941, and sentenced to death and executed the following year. In January 1945, a German-perpetrated death march of prisoners of various nationalities from the dissolved camp in Żabikowo to the Sachsenhausen concentration camp passed through the town.

== Culture ==
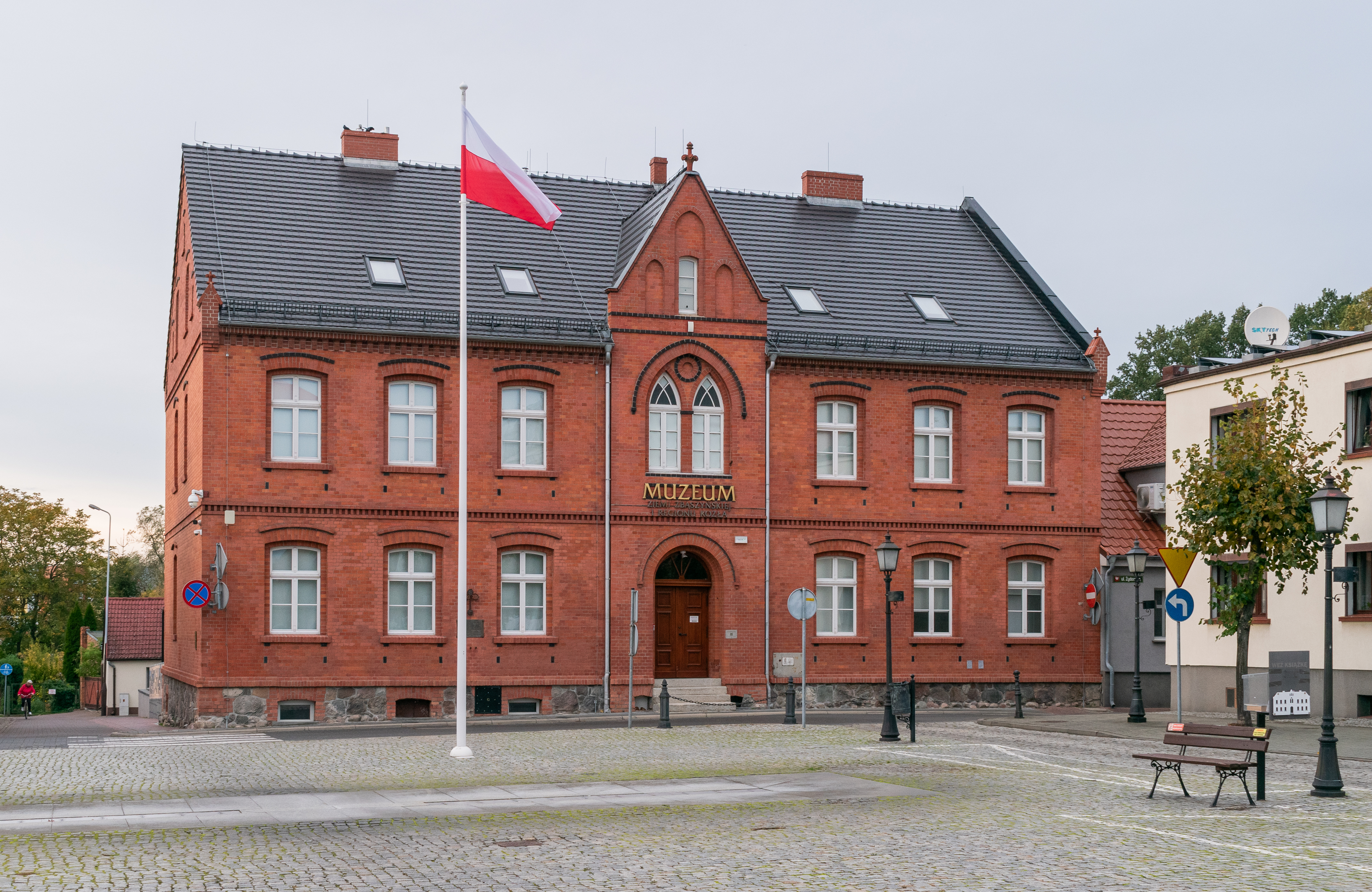
Museum in Zbąszyń

There is a historical and ethnographic museum in Zbąszyń (Muzeum Ziemi Zbąszyńskiej i Regionu Kozła).

== Demographics ==
Historical population

Year	Pop.	±%
1871	2,451	—
1880	2,677	+9.2%
1890	3,176	+18.6%
1900	3,787	+19.2%

Year	Pop.	±%
1910	4,473	+18.1%
1921	4,460	−0.3%
1931	5,432	+21.8%
1939	6,000	+10.5%

Year	Pop.	±%
1950	4,711	−21.5%
1960	5,521	+17.2%
2010	7,211	+30.6%

== Sports ==
The local football club is Obra Zbąszyń. It competes in the lower leagues.

== Notable residents ==
- Marcin Czechowic (1532–1613), Polish theologian
- Stefan Garczyński (1690–1756), Polish nobleman and writer
- Otto Schmirgal (1900–1944), German politician
- Hans Petersson (1902–1984), German mathematician
- Stanisław Olejniczak (born 1938), Polish former basketball player, member of the Poland men's national basketball team

== See also ==
- Henryk Rolirad
