= Feliks Chiczewski =

Polish diplomat (1889–1972)

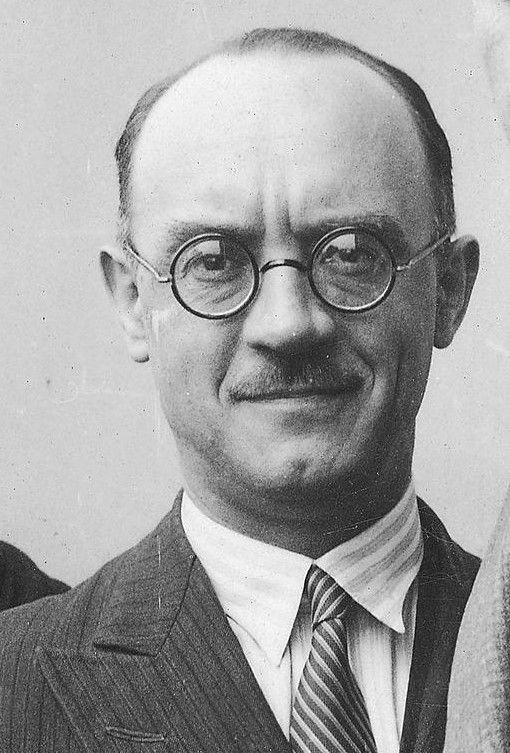
Image of Feliks Chiczewski

Feliks Chiczewski (18 May 1889–1972) was a Polish diplomat. He distinguished himself during the expulsions of Polish Jews (known as the Polish Action) from Leipzig by the Nazi regime in October 1938. His actions as consul general resulted in up to 1,500 Jews being spared from deportation.

== Career ==
Chiczewski was born in Sosnowiec, Poland, in 1889. He studied business in Antwerp followed by graduating from the University of Warsaw with a degree in higher administration.

He spent his career working for the Polish Ministry of Foreign Affairs, where he served many roles. From 1920 to 1922, he was the Consulate of the Republic of Poland in Gałacz. From 1922 to 1928, he held the same position in Bucharest, Romania. He left Romania in 1928 and worked at the Polish parliament and as a consul in Brussels until November 1934. On November 1, 1934, he became the Head of the Consulate of the Republic of Poland in Leipzig.

== Polish Action (Polenaktion) of 1938 in Leipzig ==
A 31 March 1938 decision made by the Polish government to terminate the citizenship of Poles who had lived abroad for more than 5 years left many Jews of Poland stateless. Rising tensions between the German and Polish foreign ministry lead to mass expulsions from the state of Saxony, the closest to the Polish border, beginning on 27 October 1938. 3,364 of Leipzig's Jews were of Polish origin, making it the second largest population of Eastern European Jews in Germany.

Around 4 a.m. on 27 October 1938, arrests of Jews began taking place in Leipzig by the Gestapo. The consulate learned of the ongoing arrests by 6 a.m. As warnings about the upcoming arrests and subsequent expulsions began to spread on 27 October, many Jews sought shelter at the Polish Consulate, which was a large villa that had been rented from the Ury family. Questions remained about the legitimacy of the villa as extraterritorial grounds since the Polish government had not purchased it outright. Despite this, the police did not enter the grounds over fears of further damaging the frail Germany-Poland relationship. Chiczewski and his staff supported Jews who arrived at his gates by providing food and shelter, albeit in a limited manner. The police checked identification papers of some people entering the villa, others were arrested outside of the consulate.

Personal accounts from survivors provide details of the situation inside the villa. Shlomo Wahrman, who spent several hours in the residence, described the Leipzigers as terrified about their unknown fate. Although Chiczewski had attempted to bring in as much food as he could, there was a severe food shortage. Since the villa lacked the means to support large numbers of people, significant assistance was provided by the local community, including families like the Wahrmans. Many Jews violated their religious observance of the Sabbath by cooking and baking on the grounds that saving lives overrides religious principle. The assistance of local businesses and individuals arriving at the villa supported the large population staying at the villa while Polish officials worked to protect them from deportation. Various sources estimate the number of Jews seeking shelter to have been between 1,200 and 1,500, with 1,296 Jews being a common figure. Police reports indicate 1,296 Jews had taken shelter there, roughly 50% of the Jewish population in Leipzig.

Chiczewski negotiated with the German foreign ministry to not only prevent the expulsion of the Leipzig Jews, but successfully allowed roughly 1,300 Jews to return to their homes in Leipzig. According to Chiczewski's report, he received assurance from the Police Chief of Leipzig that the Jews would not have any trouble remaining in Germany until the matter had been resolved with a Polish-German agreement. Most of those who sought assistance from Chiczewski at the villa received a passport renewal to prevent them from becoming stateless individuals. Police reports indicated that Chiczewski encouraged others to burn their passports in order to prevent formal identification of their citizenship used in displacement and the passage over the border into Poland. However, this information is not included in Chiczewski's own report.

For the remaining Jews who had either not been warned, arrested before they could flee, or chose not to seek shelter, Chiczewski attempted to prevent their expulsion at each stage of the process. Chiczewski was not alone in his belief that the expulsions could be prevented, thus he and other Polish diplomats assured the Jews that their detainment had been a "mistake." Chiczewski made efforts at calming the Jews at the gymnasium where the Jews had been gathered, as well as at the train station. Despite his negotiations, he was ultimately unsuccessful in his attempts to block the deportations. Estimates vary on the number of Jews deported from Leipzig between 1,500 and 3,500. Wahrman reported that about 5,000 were expelled.

== Commemoration ==
Feliks Chiczewski's actions during the expulsions of Polish Jews from Leipzig in October 1938 have garnered him recognition by the Polish Institute of Leipzig.

His actions were commemorated amongst other Polish heroes in the "They Risked Their Lives..." Exhibition which took place in Leipzig in 2015.

The Institute also honored the 70th anniversary of the event, where his sister in law, Gabriela Chiczewski, participated in his honor. In 2000, a plaque commemorating his actions was hung in front of the villa.
