= 1938 expulsion of Polish Jews from Germany =

Deportation of 17,000 Polish Jews by the Nazi regime

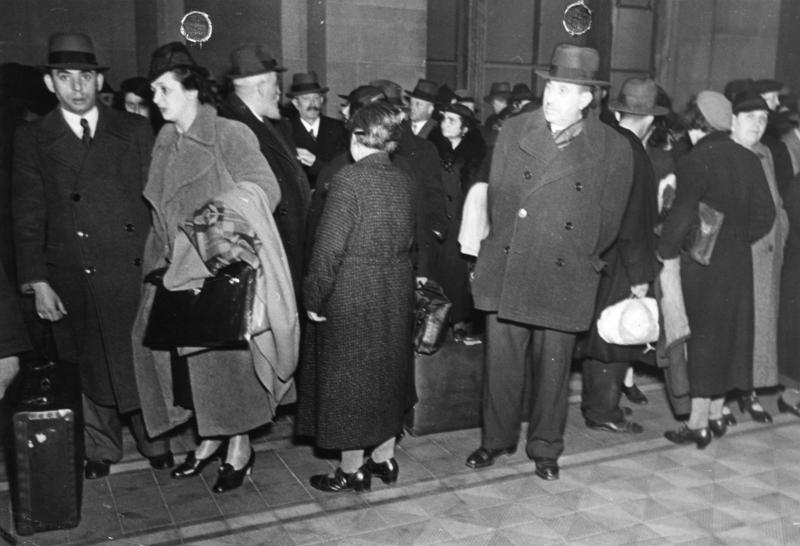
Polish Jews expelled from Nuremberg

In October 1938, about 17,000 Jewish Poles living in Nazi Germany were arrested and expelled. These deportations, termed by the Nazis Polenaktion ("Polish Action"), were ordered by SS officer and head of the Gestapo Reinhard Heydrich. The deported Jews were initially rejected by Poland and therefore had to live in makeshift encampments along the Germany–Poland border.

== Origins ==
From 1935 to 1938, Jews living within Germany had been stripped of most of their rights by the Nuremberg Laws, and faced intense persecution from the state. As a result, many Jewish refugees sought rapidly to emigrate out of the Reich. However, most countries, still feeling the effects of a global depression, enacted strict immigration laws and simply would not address the refugee problem. According to a census conducted in 1933, over 57 percent of the foreign Jews living in Germany were Polish. Following the German annexation of Austria on 13 March 1938, the Polish government became worried that it would face a large-scale return of Jewish citizens of Poland that had been living in Austria. On 31 March 1938, the parliament approved legislation enabling the revocation of Polish citizenship if the person had been living abroad for more than five years since the establishment of Poland in 1919. The German government, which did not want to be stuck with tens of thousands of stateless Jewish Poles, passed legislation in August that allowed it to deport any foreigner who had lost their citizenship from their home country. Additionally, a confidential directive was issued to not allow any new residence permits to be issued to Jews.

On October 6, 1938, the Polish Ministry of Internal Affairs announced an ordinance requiring that Polish citizens living outside Poland obtain an endorsement stamp on their passports before October 30. Any passport without the stamp would become void and the owner of the passport would have his citizenship rights revoked. When thousands of Polish Jews in Germany presented their passports at Polish consular offices, they were denied the necessary stamp for various reasons. By enacting this decree and denying the stamp to Jews, the Polish Government made it clear that they had no interest in taking in Jews from the Reich, even those who were Polish citizens.

The Polish decree did not please the German Government. In 1938, Nazi policy regarding the Jews was heavily centered on emigration from the Reich rather than the mass extermination that would arise in 1942 during World War II. Thus, Nazi officials saw the Polish decree as a hindrance to their attempts at forcing Jewish emigration. In a letter to Hans Lammers, Chief of the Reich Chancellery, SS Obergruppenfuhrer Werner Best wrote:

On the 6th of October 1938, the Polish Government issued and on the 15th of October published a decree whereby all passports must bear a control stamp in order to remain valid. Passports which do not have this stamp no longer can be used for entry into Polish territory. With this decree the Polish Government obviously intend to make it impossible for numerous Polish Jews living abroad – particularly in Germany – to return to Poland. This would mean some 70,000 Polish Jews in the Reich Territory would have to be tolerated permanently in Germany.

Fearing the prospect of thousands of Polish Jews unable to legally emigrate from the Reich, the German Government felt that it had to act. As head of the Gestapo, Heydrich ordered that Polish Jews be expelled from the Reich.

== Deportations ==
From October 27 until October 29, the day before the Polish decree regarding the eligibility of passports was set to take effect, state authorities in Germany arrested approximately 17,000 Polish Jews and cancelled their German permits of residence. The Gestapo was easily able to locate those arrested through registration data and census files.

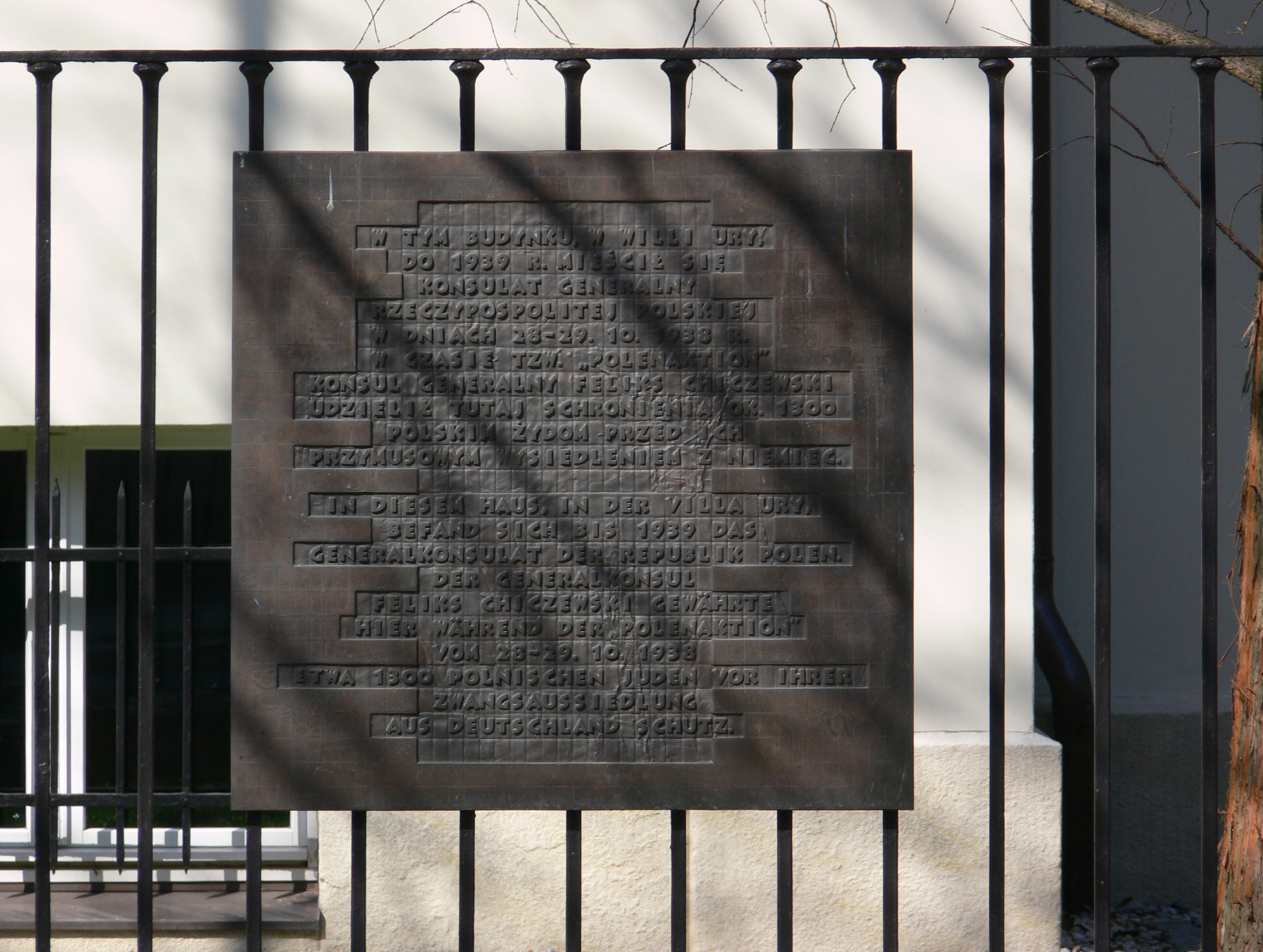
Memorial plaque at the former Polish Consulate in the Musikviertel neighbourhood in Leipzig, where 1,300 Polish Jews found shelter in 1938

After being arrested, thousands of Polish Jews were stripped of any personal property or money and put on trains. These trains brought the deportees to the Germany–Poland border. The Polish border authorities were overwhelmed at first by the unexpected influx of people and during the first day of expulsions they allowed thousands of Polish Jews entry into Poland. However, the Polish Government quickly responded by closing the border down and denying any further access. In the city of Leipzig, 1,300 Polish Jews were able to find refuge in the Polish consulate, assisted there by the Consul General Feliks Chiczewski.

By October 30, thousands of homeless Jews resided in no-man's land along the border. Historians estimate that 4,000 to 6,000 Jews were deported between the southern towns Bytom (then Beuthen) and Katowice, 1,500 were placed near the northern town of Chojnice, and 8,000 were sent to the town of Zbąszyń (source 2 pp. 123). In Zbąszyń a large refugee camp was established as an attempt to give shelter to those deported. For months, refugees in Zbąszyń slept in poorly constructed barracks with very few provisions. The severity of the conditions within the camp was witnessed by Polish historian Emanuel Ringelblum who described the hopelessness of the refugees in a letter to a colleague.

I do not think any Jewish community has ever experienced so cruel and merciless an expulsion as this one. The future is envisaged in desperate terms. People in the camp have received notices that they have lost their Polish citizenship […] Zbaszyn has become a symbol for the defenselessness of Polish Jews. Jews have been humiliated to the level of lepers, to fourth class citizens and as a result we are all affected by this terrible tragedy. Zbaszyn was a heavy moral blow to the Jewish population of Poland.

As a result of the Polenaktion of October 1938, most of the 17,000 expelled Jews would remain in refugee camps on the border for almost a year. It was not until just prior to the German Invasion of Poland in 1939 that the refugees of the Polenaktion gained access to Poland's interior.

== Response of Herschel Grynszpan ==
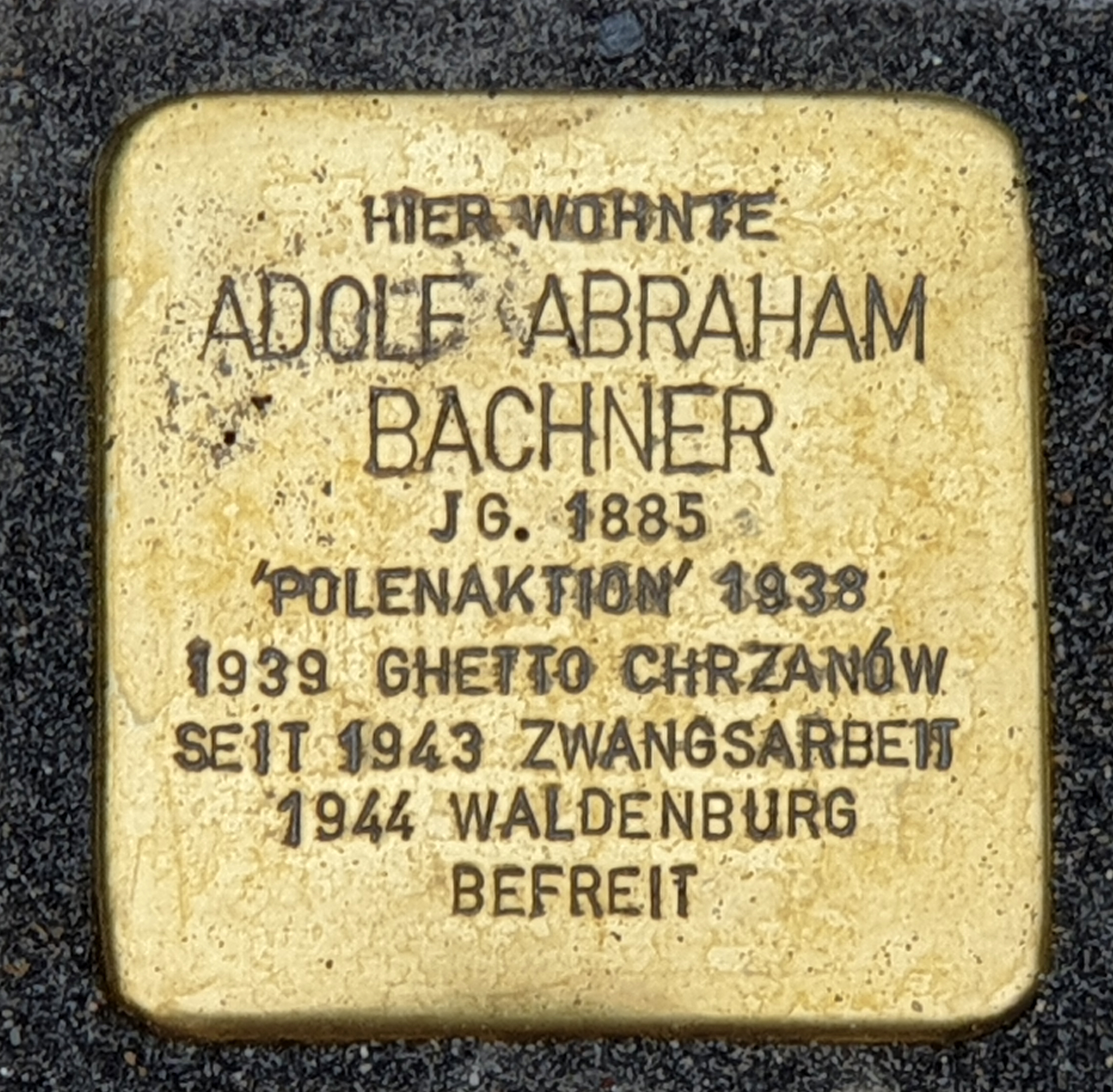
Stolperstein of Adolf Abraham Bachner, Polenaktion survivor

Among those deported on October 27 in Hanover, Germany was the family of Sendel Grynszpan. Grynszpan described police coming to their home on Thursday October 27, demanding that they go to the nearest precinct with their Polish passports. When they arrived, hundreds of people were waiting for further instructions. The police notified the crowd that they were to sign papers and present their passports. After doing so they were placed in police vans, taken to a train station, and forced onto the cars. On Saturday October 29, the Grynszpan family arrived in Zbąszyń, confused and scared.

On October 31, Sendel Grynszpan's daughter Berta was able to send a postcard from Zbąszyń to her brother Herschel Grynszpan in Paris. The postcard, which detailed the cruelty and tragedy of the family's forced relocation reached Grynszpan. Horrified and distressed by the plight of his family and the thousands of other Polish Jews, Grynszpan took it upon himself to enact revenge. Purchasing a pistol, he went to the German Embassy in Paris on November 7. There he shot and ultimately killed First Secretary of the Reich, Ernst vom Rath.

The assassination of vom Rath stunned the Nazi regime. On November 9 and 10 Jewish businesses, properties, and synagogues were destroyed, burned, and looted across the Reich, with the assassination being used by the Nazis as a pretext. This event, often referred to as Kristallnacht is often seen by historians as a key moment of significance in the formulation of the Holocaust.

== See also ==
- 1938 deportation of Jews from Slovakia
