= Miloslavov =

Miloslavov Annamajor
- Municipality
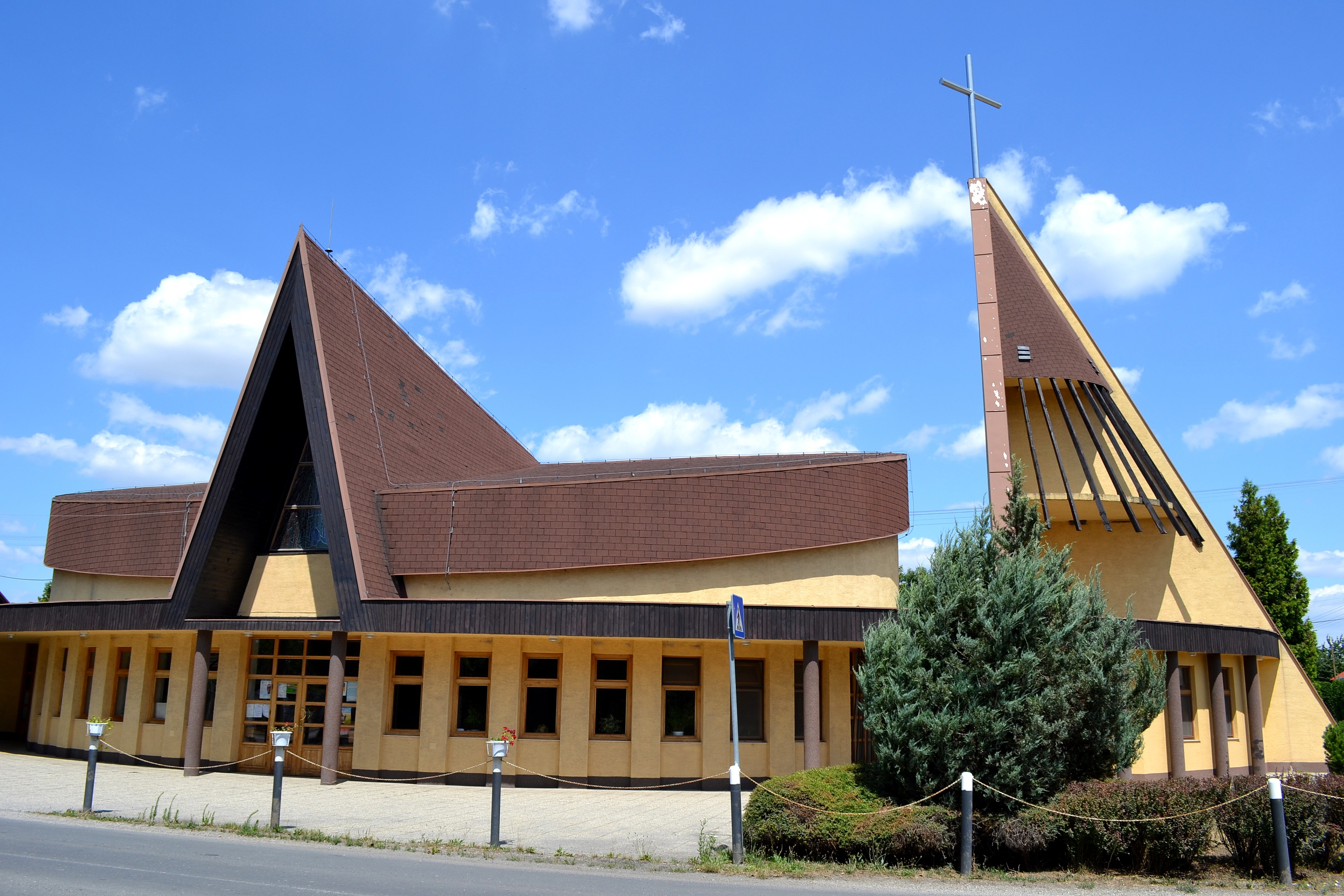
- Church in Miloslavov

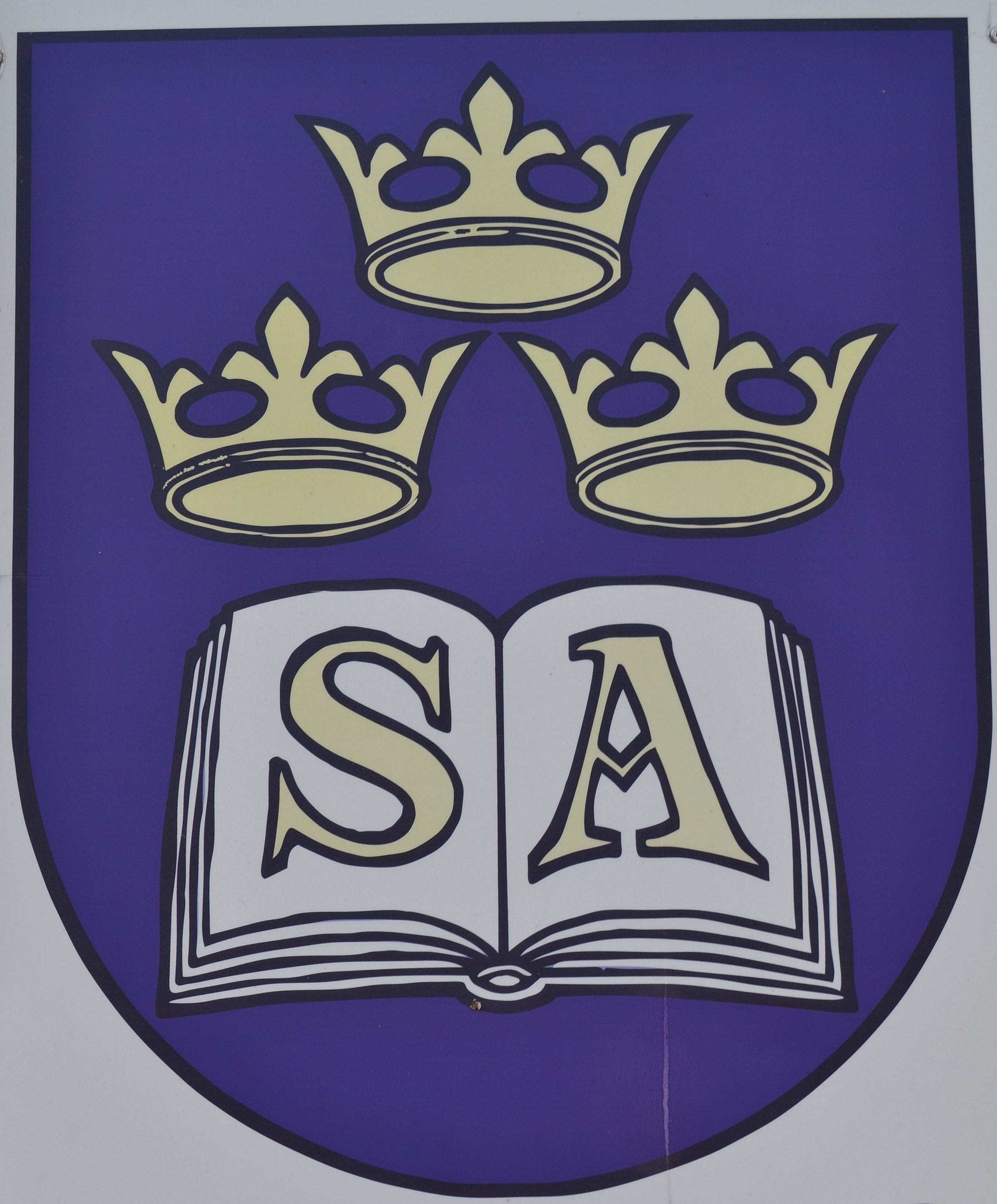
- Flag Coat of arms

- Location of Miloslavov in the Bratislava Region Location of Miloslavov in Slovakia
- Coordinates: 48.10°N 17.30°E
- Country: Slovakia
- Region: Bratislava Region
- District: Senec District
- First mentioned: 1936

Area
  - Total: 10.19 km^{2} (3.93 sq mi)
- Elevation: 128 m (420 ft)

Population (2025)
  - Total: 7,005
- Time zone: UTC+1 (CET)
  - Summer (DST): UTC+2 (CEST)
- Postal code: 900 42
- Area code: +421 17
- Vehicle registration plate (until 2022): SC
- Website: www.miloslavov.sk

Miloslavov (Hungarian: Annamajor) is a village and municipality in western Slovakia in Senec District in the Bratislava Region.

== History ==
In historical records the village was first mentioned in 1332–1337.

== Geography ==
The municipality lies at an altitude of 128 metres (420 ft) and covers an area of 10.19 km^{2} (3.93 sq mi) (2025). It consists of two parts. Miloslava and Alžbetin Dvor. Both are now under heavy real estate investment which is happening now all around Bratislava.

== Population ==
Population statistic (10 years)
Year	1995	2005	2015	2025
Count	768	1105	2265	7005
Difference		+43.88%	+104.97%	+209.27%

Population statistic
Year	2024	2025
Count	6548	7005
Difference		+6.97%

It has a population of 7005 people (31 December 2025).

=== Ethnicity ===
Census 2021 (1+ %)
Ethnicity	Number	Fraction
Slovak	3666	91.65%
Not found out	163	4.07%
Hungarian	126	3.15%
Czech	49	1.22%
Total	4000	

In year 2021 was 4000 people by ethnicity 3666 as Slovak, 163 as Not found out, 126 as Hungarian, 49 as Czech, 35 as Other, 22 as Ukrainian, 20 as Rusyn, 19 as Russian, 14 as Polish, 10 as Italian, 10 as German, 9 as Romani, 6 as Greek, 3 as Romanian, 3 as Bulgarian, 1 as Jewish, 1 as Vietnamese, 1 as Serbian, 1 as Silesian, 1 as Moravian and 1 as Albanian.

Note on population: The difference values of population numbers in the table "Population statistic" and in the sections "Ethnicity" & "Religion" is caused by the use of various statistical methods.

=== Religion ===
Census 2021 (1+ %)
Religion	Number	Fraction
None	1835	45.88%
Roman Catholic Church	1416	35.4%
Evangelical Church	241	6.03%
Not found out	167	4.18%
Baptists Church	85	2.13%
Greek Catholic Church	65	1.63%
Total	4000	

In year 2021 was 4000 people by religion 1835 from None, 1416 from Roman Catholic Church, 241 from Evangelical Church, 167 from Not found out, 85 from Baptists Church, 65 from Greek Catholic Church, 33 from Eastern Orthodox Church, 26 from Other, 21 from Other and not ascertained christian church, 20 from Calvinist Church, 15 from Islam, 15 from Ad hoc movements, 14 from Christian Congregations in Slovakia, 11 from Apostolic Church, 8 from Jehovah's Witnesses, 7 from Paganism and natural spirituality, 6 from United Methodist Church, 6 from Buddhism, 4 from Church of the Brethren, 3 from Hinduism and 2 from Jewish community.

According to the 2011 census, the municipality had 1,780 inhabitants. 1,589 of inhabitants were Slovaks, 47 Hungarians, 12 Czechs and 132 others and unspecified.

== External links/Sources ==
Media related to Miloslavov at Wikimedia Commons

- Miloslavov - Webpage of Miloslavov
- https://web.archive.org/web/20070513023228/http://www.statistics.sk/mosmis/eng/run.html
