= Veľký Kýr =

Village and municipality in Slovakia

- Municipality
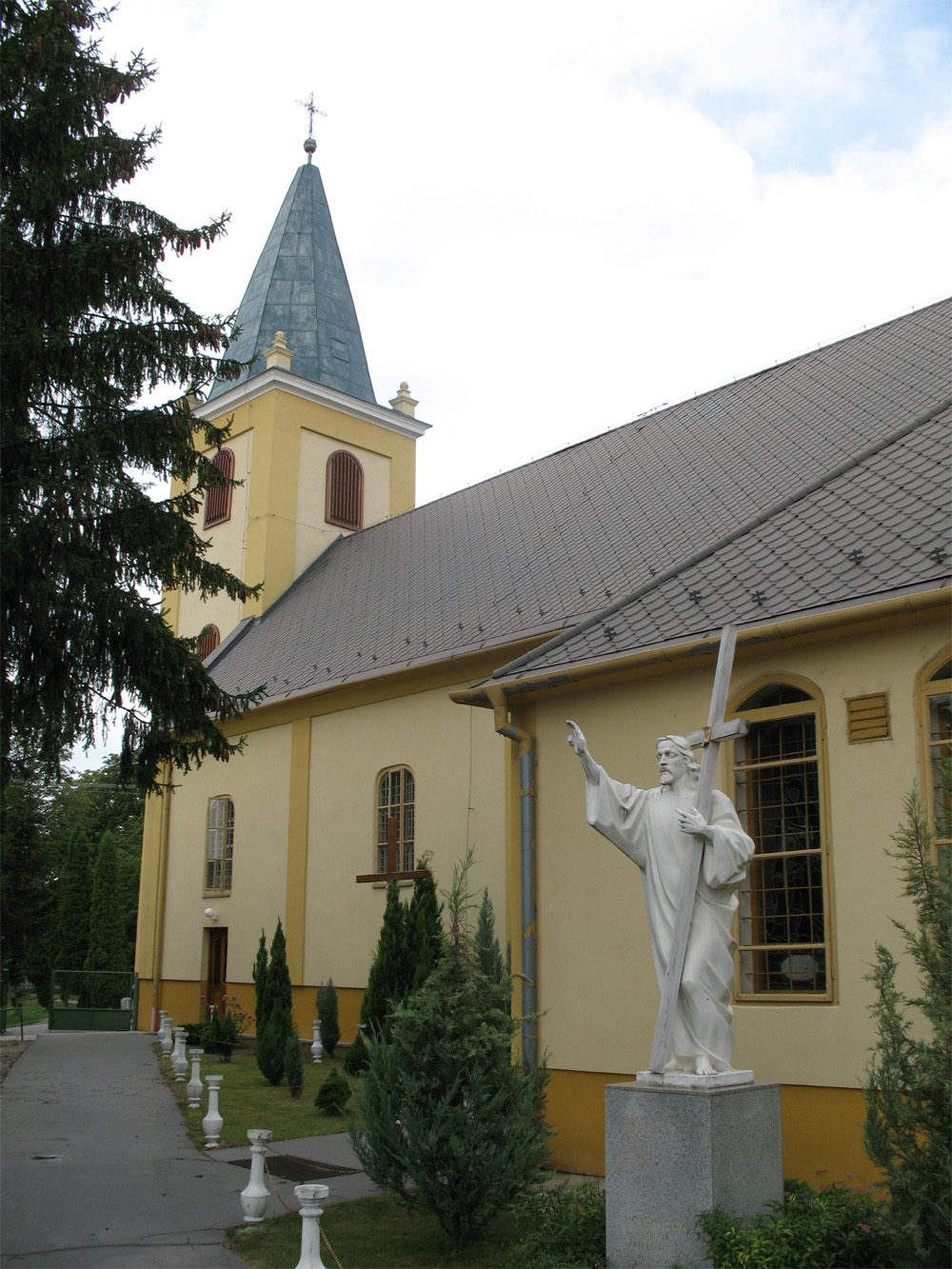
- Parish Church

- Flag Coat of arms

- Location of Veľký Kýr in the Nitra Region Location of Veľký Kýr in Slovakia
- Coordinates: 48.18°N 18.17°E
- Country: Slovakia
- Region: Nitra Region
- District: Nové Zámky District
- First mentioned: 1113

Area
  - Total: 23.63 km^{2} (9.12 sq mi)
- Elevation: 127 m (417 ft)

Population (2025)
  - Total: 2,899
- Time zone: UTC+1 (CET)
  - Summer (DST): UTC+2 (CEST)
- Postal code: 941 07
- Area code: +421 35
- Vehicle registration plate (until 2022): NZ
- Website: velkykyr.sk

Veľký Kýr (Hungarian: Nagykér or Nyitranagykér) is a village and municipality in the Nové Zámky District in the Nitra Region of south-west Slovakia.

== History ==
In historical records the village was first mentioned in 1113.

== Geography ==
The municipality lies at an altitude of 127 metres (417 ft) and covers an area of 23.63 km^{2} (9.12 sq mi) (2025).

== Population ==
Population statistic (10 years)
Year	1995	2005	2015	2025
Count	3321	3069	3002	2899
Difference		−7.58%	−2.18%	−3.43%

Population statistic
Year	2024	2025
Count	2931	2899
Difference		−1.09%

It has a population of 2899 people (31 December 2025).

=== Ethnicity ===
Census 2021 (1+ %)
Ethnicity	Number	Fraction
Slovak	1641	55.06%
Hungarian	1544	51.81%
Not found out	46	1.54%
Total	2980	

In year 2021 was 2980 people by ethnicity 1641 as Slovak, 1544 as Hungarian, 46 as Not found out, 14 as Czech, 9 as Other, 5 as Croatian, 3 as German, 2 as Romani, 1 as Jewish, 1 as Turkish, 1 as Italian, 1 as Rusyn, 1 as Russian, 1 as Greek and 1 as French.

Note on population: The difference values of population numbers in the table "Population statistic" and in the sections "Ethnicity" & "Religion" is caused by the use of various statistical methods.

=== Religion ===
Census 2021 (1+ %)
Religion	Number	Fraction
Roman Catholic Church	2594	87.05%
None	247	8.29%
Not found out	47	1.58%
Total	2980	

In year 2021 was 2980 people by religion 2594 from Roman Catholic Church, 247 from None, 47 from Not found out, 18 from Evangelical Church, 15 from Greek Catholic Church, 14 from Calvinist Church, 11 from Christian Congregations in Slovakia, 11 from Ad hoc movements, 5 from Buddhism, 4 from Old Catholic Church, 3 from Other and not ascertained christian church, 3 from Other, 2 from Eastern Orthodox Church, 2 from Islam, 2 from Seventh-day Adventist Church, 1 from Paganism and natural spirituality and 1 from Hinduism.

== Facilities ==
The village has a small public library a gym and football pitch. It also has a DVD rental store.
