= Johann Nepomuk Gobert d'Aspremont-Lynden =

Austrian nobleman (1732–1805)

Johann Nepomuk Gobert d'Aspremont-Lynden (23 August 1732 — 16 April 1805, Vienna) was an Austrian nobleman from the House of Aspremont-Lynden and the Count of Reckheim. The Aspremont Summer Palace in Bratislava is named after him.

== Family ==
Johann Nepomuk Gobert d'Aspremont-Lynden was the son of Karl Gobert d'Aspremont-Lynden and Marie Eleonore Kokorzowecz von Kokorzowa. Both his parents died when he was a teenager. On his father's side, he was also related to the Houses of Rákóczi and Báthory.

On 1 December 1756 Johann Nepomuk Gobert d'Aspremont-Lynden married Maria Elisabeth Franziska von Wolkenstein-Trostburg Countess of Wolkenstein-Trostburg. Their son, Johann Nepomuk Gobert d'Aspremont-Lynden, was born on 22 September 1757. The son had a single daughter who married into the Erdődy noble family.

His older sister was Maria Anna Elisabeth d'Aspremont-Lynden and she had previously also married a member of the House of Wolkenstein-Trostburg (Paris Ignaz).

Johann Nepomuk Gobert d'Aspremont-Lynden died on 16 April 1805 in Vienna. His wife had died 12 years prior on 5 January 1793.

== Legacy ==
Johann Nepomuk Gobert d'Aspremont-Lynden is nowadays best known for giving his name to the Aspremont Summer Palace in Bratislava, Slovakia. He bought the land in 1769 and in 1770 ordered the construction of the palace and a garden (today Medical Garden) based on designs by the architect Johann Joseph Thaler. The palace was built in a Baroque classicist style and it is one of the few remaining palaces in the immediate vicinity of Old Town, Bratislava.

It is unclear what exactly motivated Gobert d'Aspremont-Lynden to purchase the plot in Pressburg and build a palace there. At the time, he lived with his family between Vienna and his estate in Lednické Rovne. Although closer to Vienna, Pressburg (Bratislava) is situated between those two locations.

The ownership of the palace changed hands several times in the late 19th century before it was transferred to the Faculty of Medicine of the Comenius University. The palace has always housed the offices of the Faculty's dean. Despite carrying different names over its lifetime — after other owners such as the Esterházy family — the palace is nowadays most commonly referred to as the Aspremont Summer Palace.
