= Medical Garden =

Public park in Bratislava, Slovakia

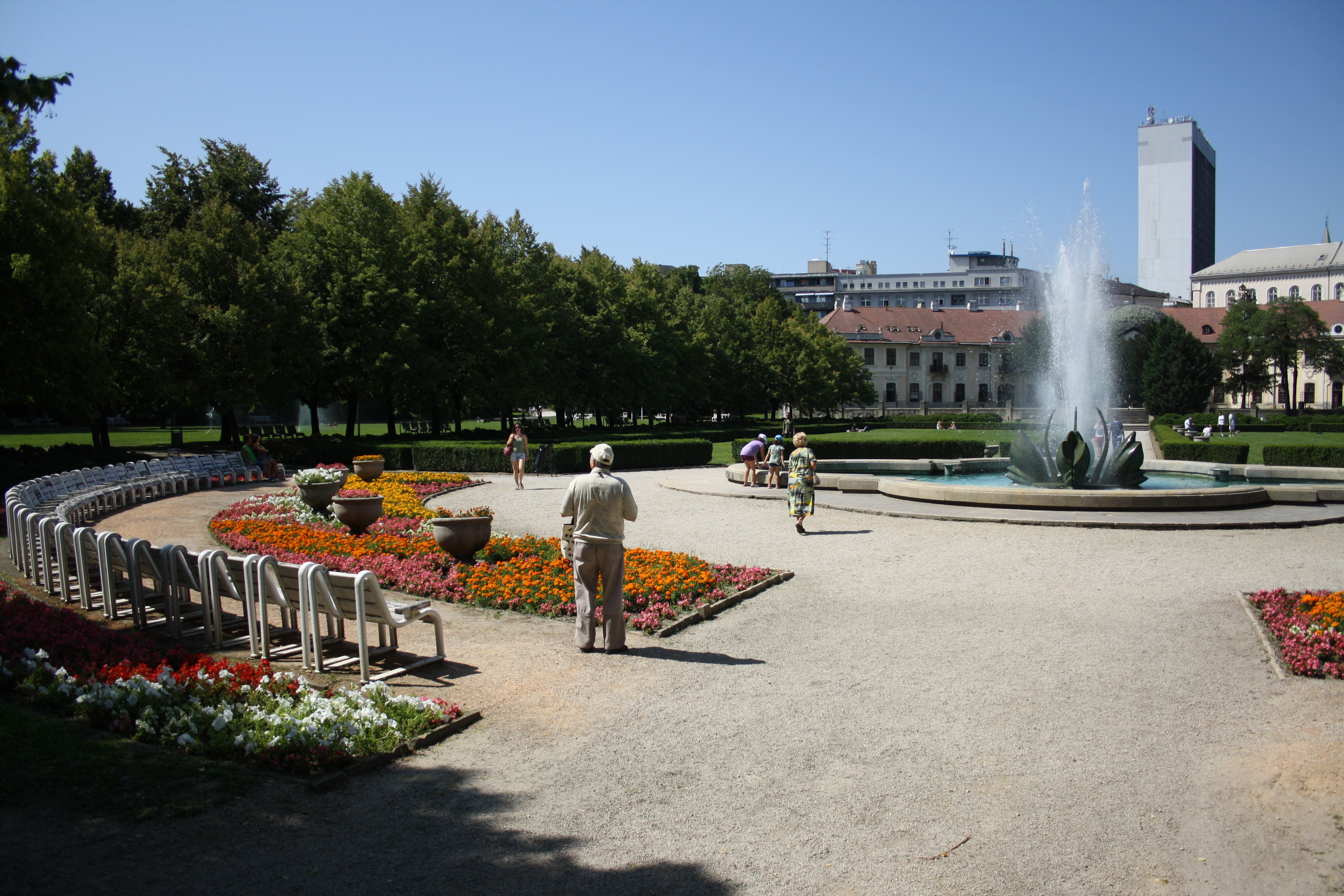
- View of the central part of the park
- Interactive map of Medical Garden
- Location: Bratislava, Slovakia
- Coordinates: 48°08′59″N 17°07′11″E
- Established: 1770

Medical Garden (Slovak: Medická záhrada) is a public park in Bratislava, Slovakia. It is located in the Old Town near the American square and behind the Aspremont Summer Palace.

The Medical Garden was built and renovated in the Baroque style and is an example of a French formal garden. The garden belongs to the city's most popular parks. It also includes a playground.

== Description ==
The Medical Garden was originally part of a Baroque palace complex built by Count Johann Nepomuk Gobert d'Aspremont-Lynden in 1770, during the reign of Maria Theresa. The Aspremont Summer Palace is preserved to this day and serves as the seat of the dean's office of the Medical Faculty of Comenius University in Bratislava. The garden was built and later renovated in the Baroque style and various types of ornamental and exotic plants were grown here, which were complemented by various artistic sculptures.

At the beginning of the 19th century, the garden was bought by Count Esterházy, who further expanded it and organized various orchestras, evening balls and parties. The famous composer Joseph Haydn is known to have performed there several times. Later, the garden changed owners and for a time it even kept cattle. As the character of the city changed, the Medical Garden found itself in the center surrounded by dense buildings. At the beginning of the 20th century, it was administered by the Faculty of Medicine, which made it available to the public. It quickly became a popular and sought-after location for all Bratislava residents.

In 1985, a renovation took place according to a project by Alfonso Tormom, when the garden took on its current form. No significant sculptures or architecture have been preserved from the original decoration. The swan fountain, authored by sculptor Pavol Mikšik, is the main landmark of the Medical Garden and can be found in the center of the park. The park also hosts two monuments: the writer Martin Kukučín and poet Sándor Petőfi. The park area is decorated with flower beds.

== See also ==
- Old Town, Bratislava
- Parks and gardens in Bratislava
