= List of palaces in Bratislava =

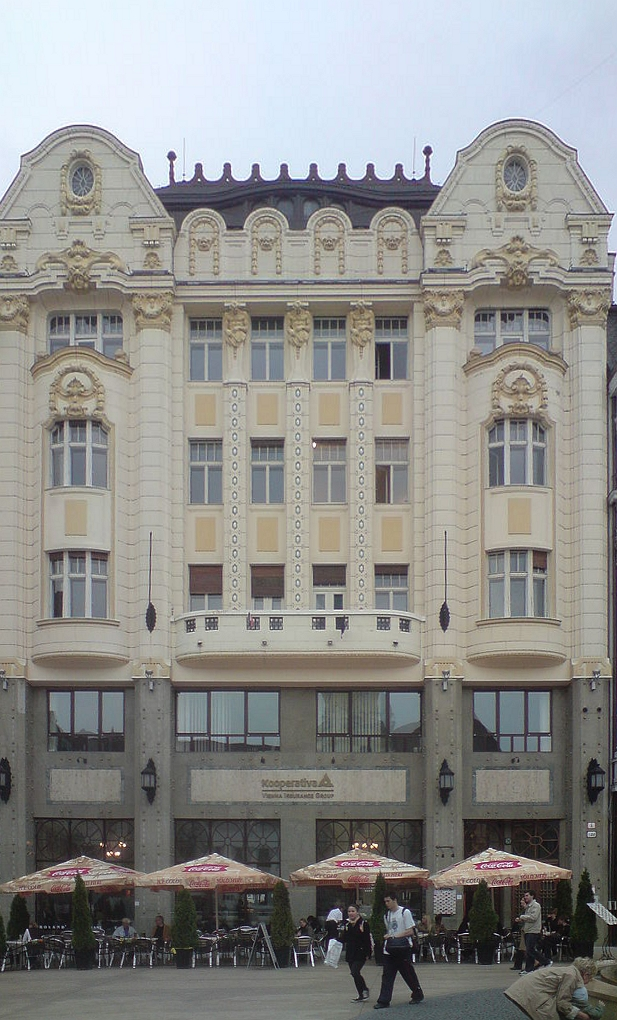
Palace of the Hungarian Discount and Exchange Bank

This is a list of palaces in Bratislava, both historical and from the modern era.

== Existing palaces ==
=== Panská Street ===
- Johann Pálffy Palace
- Keglevich Palace (Panská 27)
- Csaky Palace, Panská Street, Bratislava (Panská)
- Esterházy Palace, Panská Street, Bratislava (Panská)
- Balassov Palace (Panská 15)

=== Main Square ===
- Kutscherfeld Palace (Hlavné námestie 7, Sedlárska 7)
- Vice-Governor's Palace(Hlavné námestie 8)
- Palace of the Hungarian Discount and Exchange Bank (Hlavné námestie)
- Jeszenák Palace, Hlavné námestie, Bratislava (Hlavné námestie 4)
- Palugyay Palace, Hlavné námestie, Bratislava (Zelená, Hlavné námestie)

=== Ventúrska Street ===
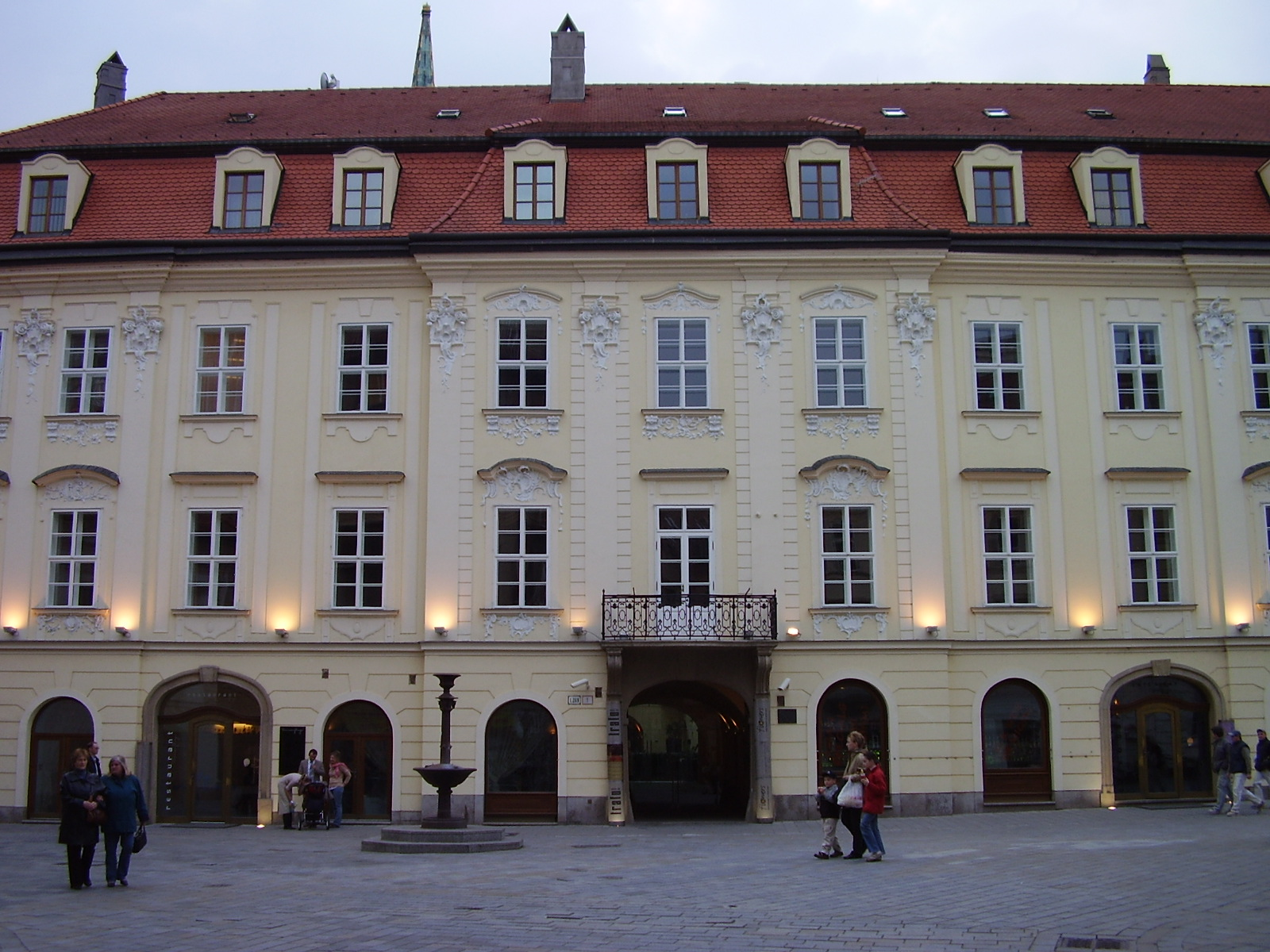
Erdödy Palace, Ventúrska

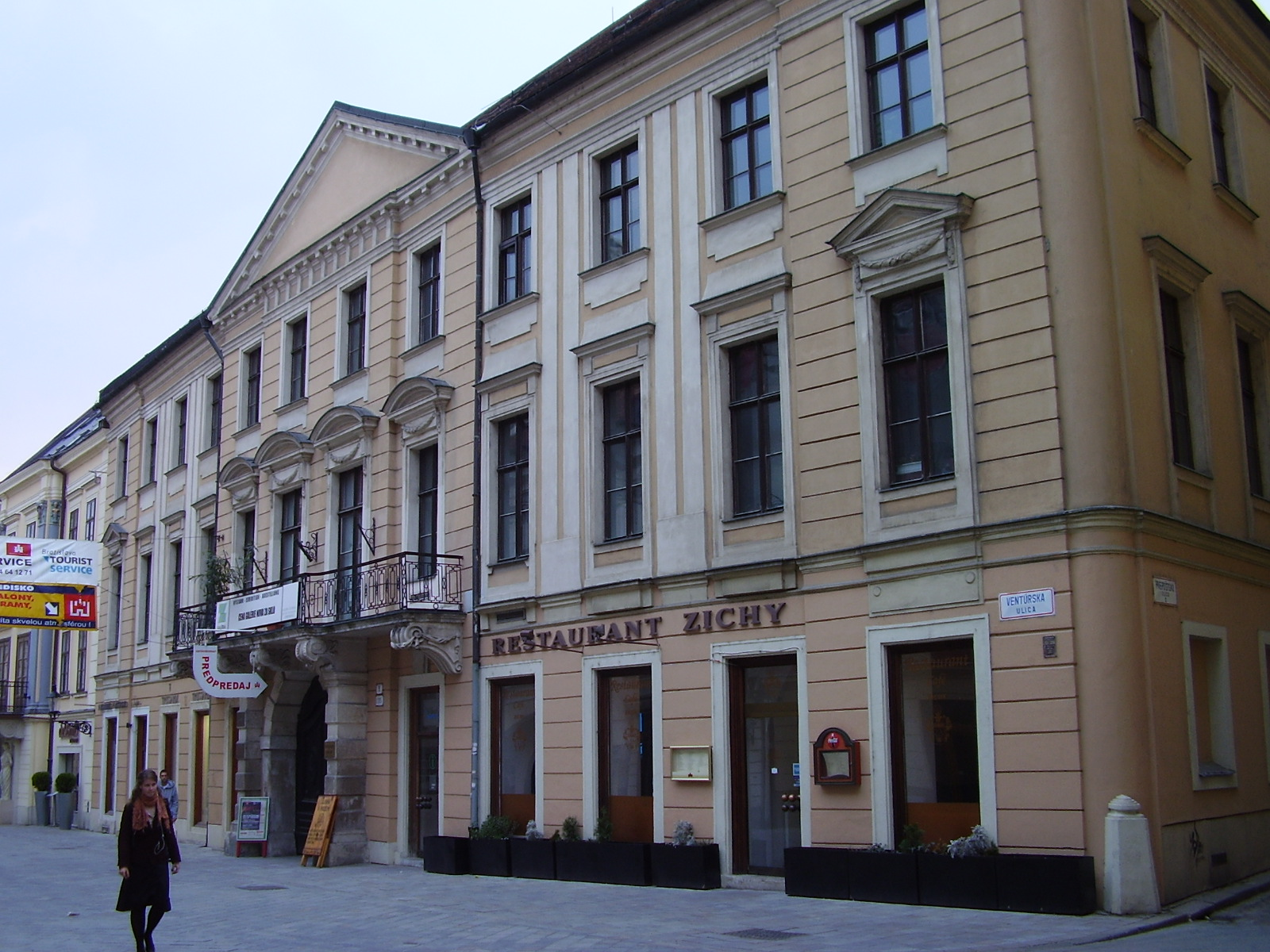
Zičhy Palace

- Erdödy Palace, Ventúrska Street, Bratislava (Ventúrska 1)
- Zichy Palace(Ventúrska 9)
- Pálffy Palace (Ventúrska 10)
- Leopold de Pauli Palace (Ventúrska 15)

=== Bratislava Castle (Podhradie) ===
- Royal Palace in Bratislava Castle
- Palace of Prince Rohan (Vydrica)

=== Hviezdoslavovo námestie ===
- Csomov Palace (Hviezdoslavovo námestie 6)
- Nesterov Palace (Hviezdoslavovo námestie)
- Pálffy Palace, Hviezdoslavovo námestie (Hviezdoslavovo námestie 18)
- Maldeghem Palace (Hviezdoslavovo námestie 12)

=== Ľudovíta Štúra Square ===
- Esterházy Palace (Námestie Ľudovíta Štúra)
- Dessewffyho Palace (Námestie Ľudovíta Štúra)
- Lanfranconiho Palace (Námestie Ľudovíta Štúra 1)

=== Gorkého Street ===
- Motešických Palace (Gorkého 5, Laurinská 8)

=== Štefánikova Street ===
- Pistoriho Palace (Štefánikova 25)
- Karáčoniho Palace (Štefánikova 2)

=== SNP Square ===
- Main Post Office, Bratislava (SNP Square)
- Tatra Bank Palace (SNP Square)

=== Kapitulská Street ===
- Prepoštský Place (Kapitulská)
- Esterházy Palace (Kapitulská 6-8)

=== Michalská Street ===
- Palace of the Hungarian King's Chamber (Michalská 1)
- Jesenákov palác (Michalská 3)

=== Panenská Street ===
- Georgievitsov palác (Panenská 11)
- Habermayerov palác (Panenská 15)

=== Vajanského Embankment ===
- Jurenákov palác (Vajanského nábrežie 3)

=== Dunajská Street ===
- Viczayov palác (demolished)

=== Sienkiewiczova Street ===
- Palác Robotníckej poisťovne (Sienkiewiczova 1)

=== Hodžovo námestie ===
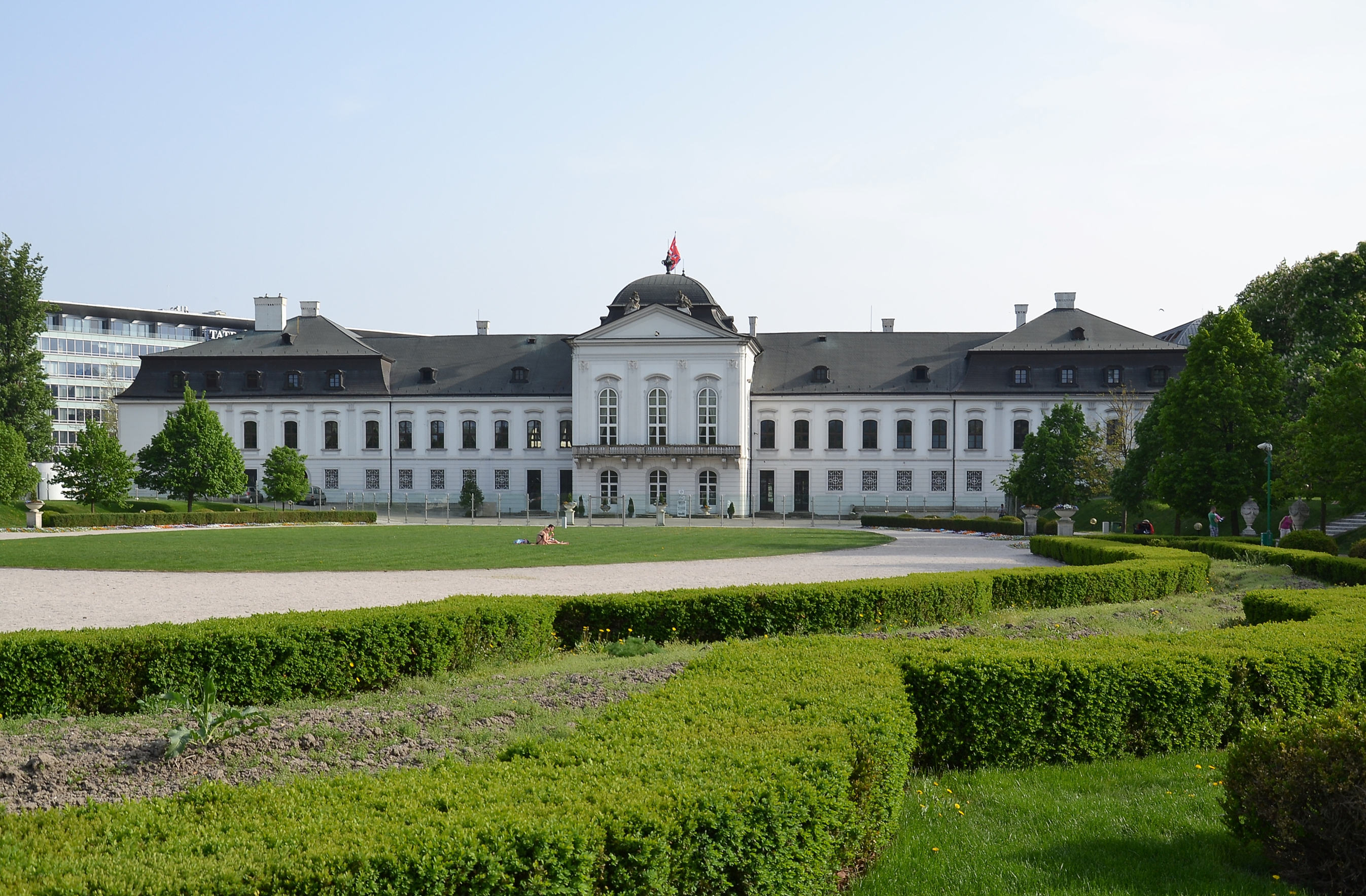
Grassalkovich Palace

- Grassalkovich Palace (Hodžovo námestie 1)

=== Godrova Street ===
- Erdödyho palác (Godrova 2)

=== Františkánske Square ===
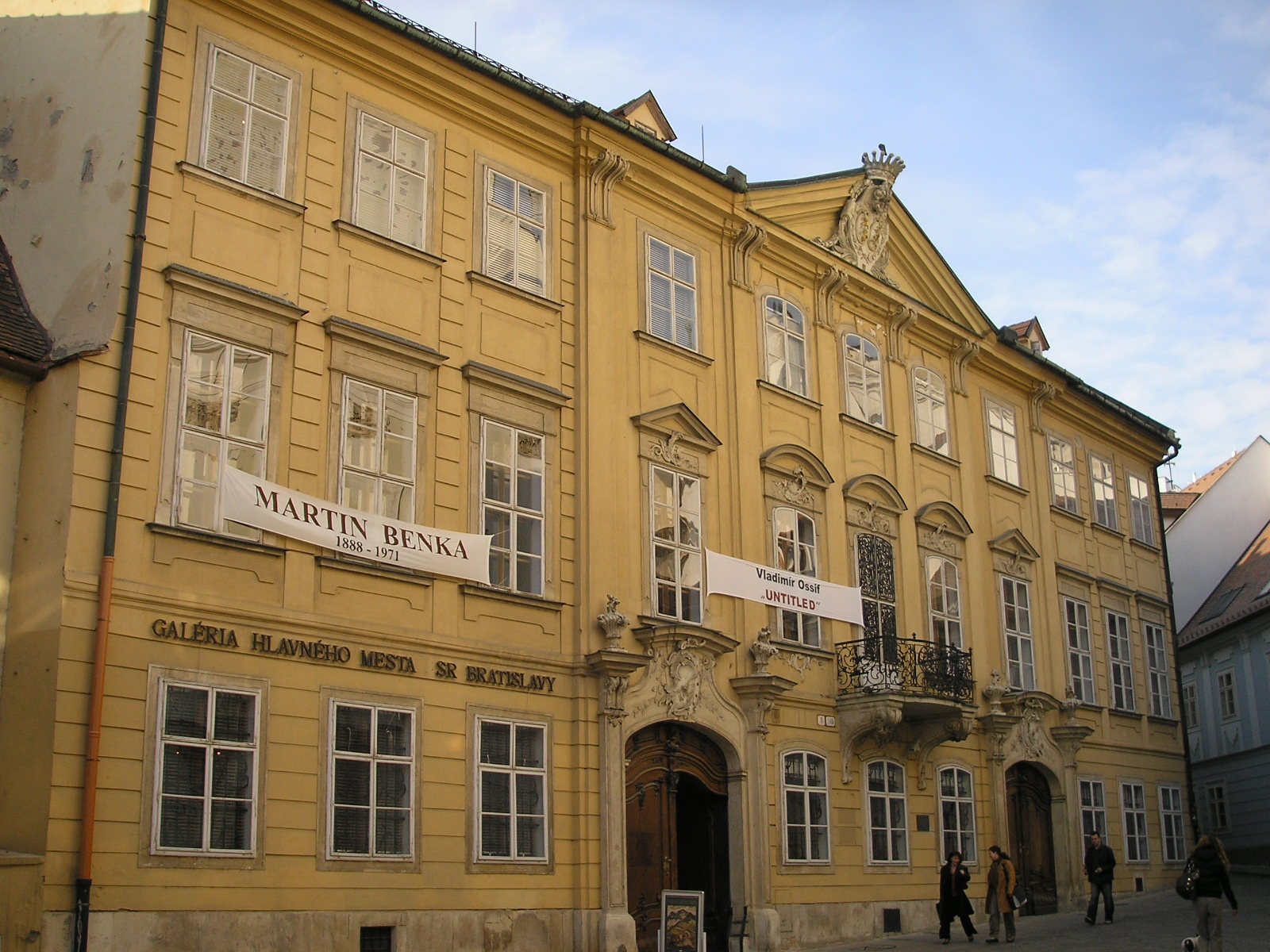
Mirbach Palace

- Mirbach Palace (Františkánske námestie)

=== Pražská Street ===
- Palugyayov palác (Pražská)

=== Štúrova Street ===
- Čákiho palác (Štúrova)

=== Radničná Street ===
- Aponiho palác (Radničná 1)

=== Špitálska Street ===
- Aspremont Summer Palace(Špitálska 24)

=== Uršulínska ===
- Palác Ruttkayovcov Vrútockých (Uršulínska 6)

=== Slobody Square ===
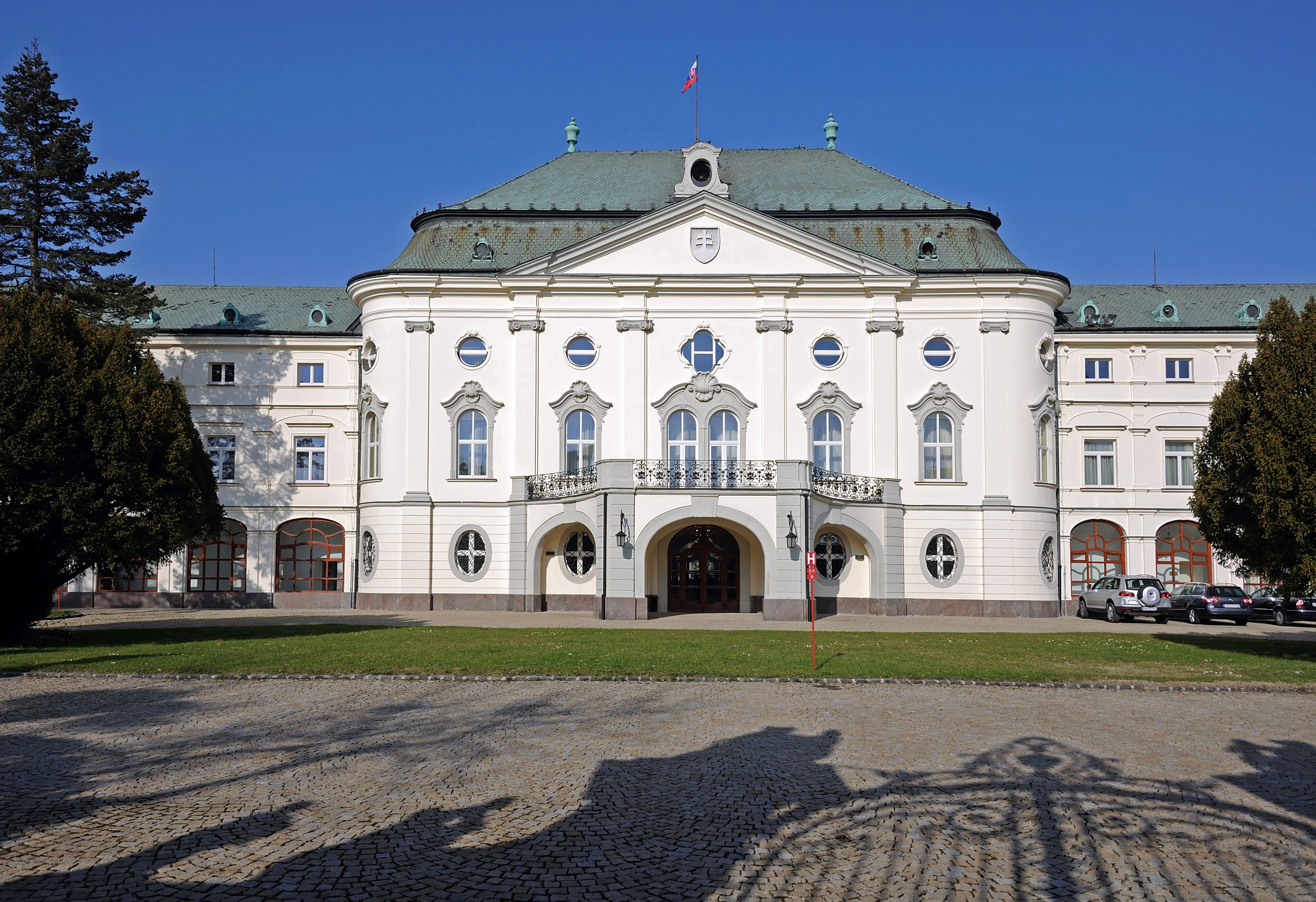
Episcopal Summer Palace

- Episcopal Summer Palace (Námestie slobody 1)

=== Primaciálne Square ===
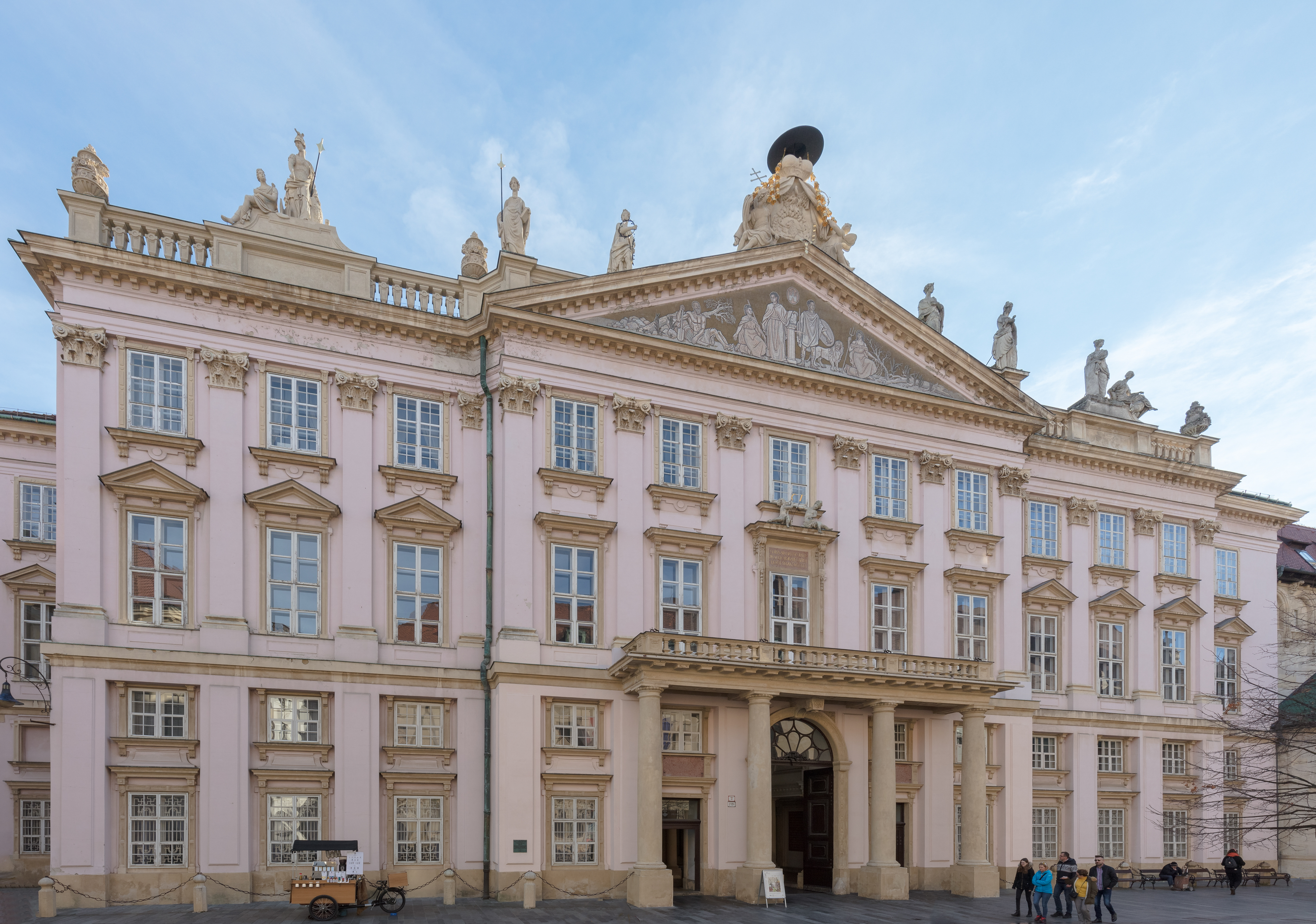
Primate's Palace

- Primate's Palace (Primaciálne námestie 2)

=== Krížna Street ===
- Ludwigov palác (Krížna)

=== Záhradnícka Street ===
- Justičný palác (Záhradnícka)

== Demolished palaces ==
- Berchtold Palace
- Braunecker Palace
- Czáky Palace, Rázusovo nábrežie, Bratislava
- Landerer Palace
- Pálffy Palace and Garden, Zámocká Street, Bratislava (Summer wing only survives)
- Pálffy Palace, Gorkého Street, Bratislava
