= Tatiana Rosová =

Slovak sociologist and politician

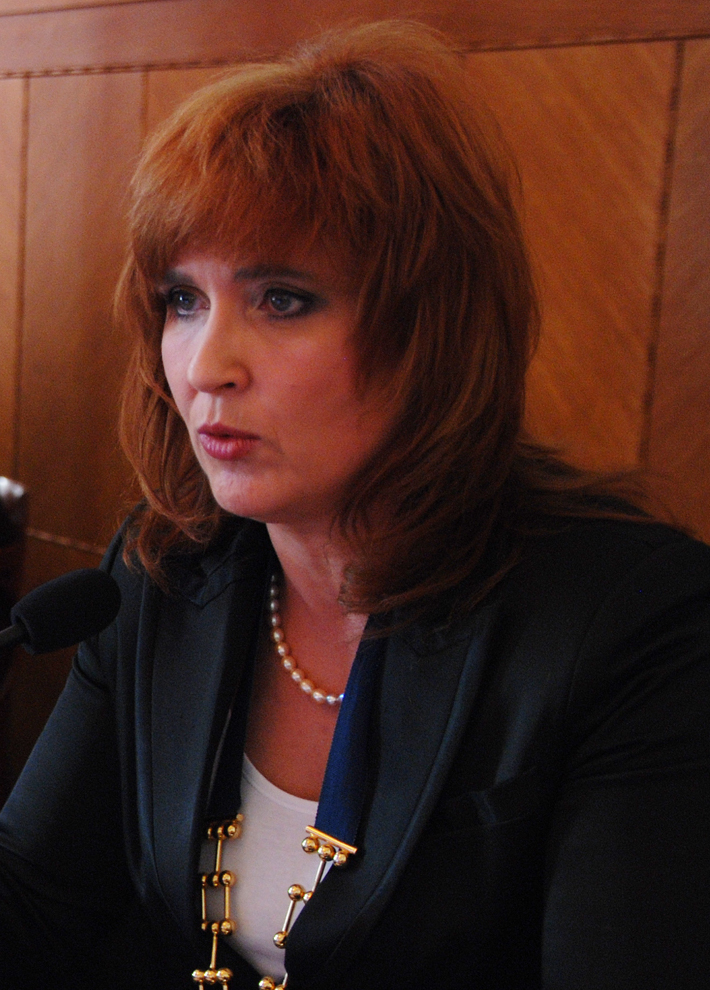

Member of the National Council
- In office 7 February 2006 – 4 April 2012

Personal details
- Born: 2 August 1961 (age 64) Bratislava, Czechoslovakia (now Slovakia)
- Party: Slovak Democratic and Christian Union – Democratic Party
- Children: 3
- Education: Comenius University

Tatiana Rosová (born 2 August 1961 in Bratislava) is a Slovak sociologist and politician. She served as a member of the National Council from 2006 to 2010.

Rosová studied sociology at the Comenius University, graduating in 1983. Before entering politics, she worked in polling and marketing research. In 2003-2006, she worked for the Slovak government.

In 2005 Rosová joined the Slovak Democratic and Christian Union – Democratic Party and became an MP for the party the following year. Between 2010 and 2014 she also served as the major of Bratislava Old Town borough. As a politician, she was criticized for receiving MP and major salary at the same time, amounting to over 7000 euro per month. After the end of her political career, she returned to polling.
