= Old Cathedral of Saint John of Matha and Saint Felix of Valois =

Church in Bratislava, Slovakia

Coordinates: 48°08′46″N 17°06′24″E

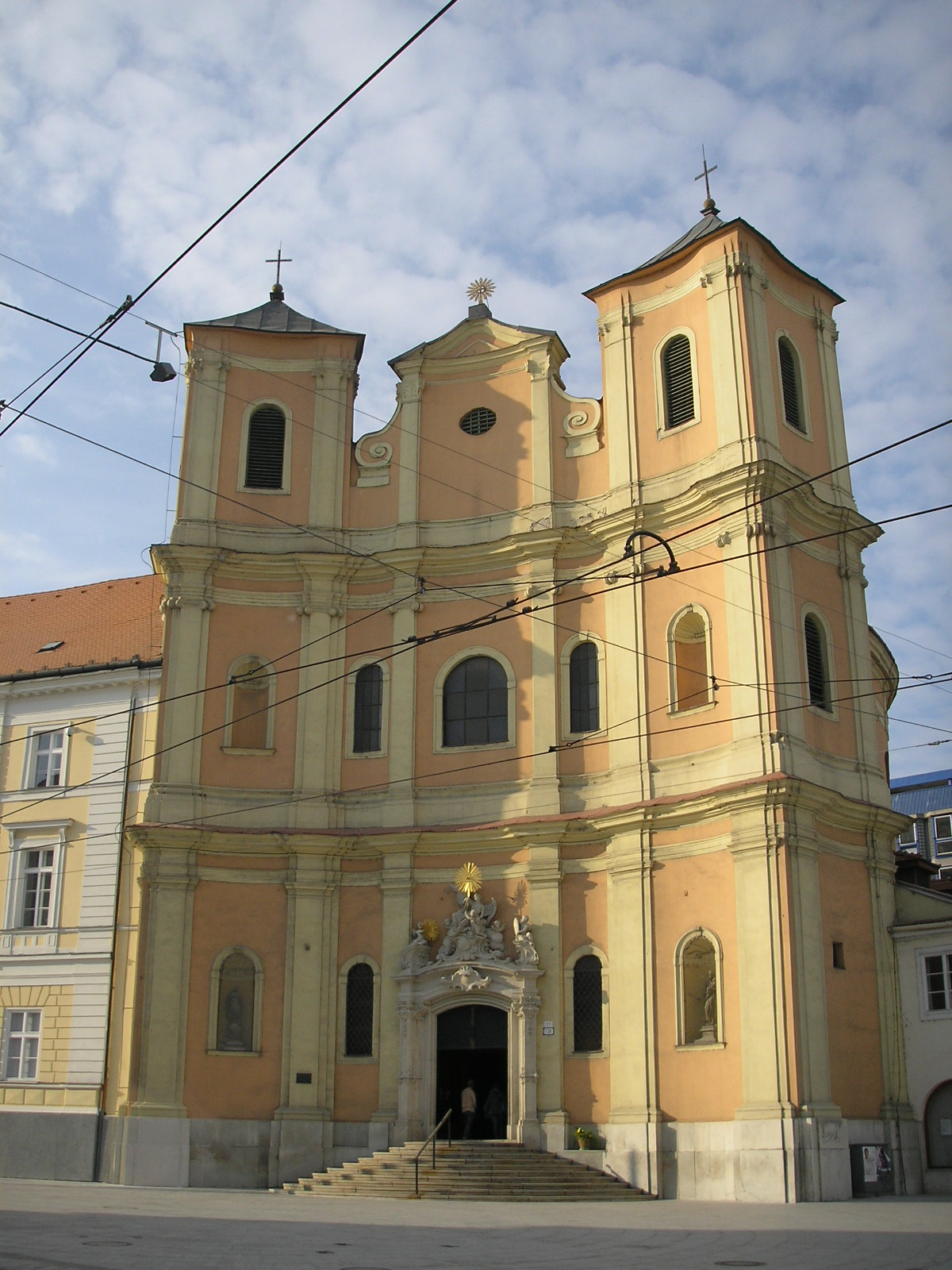
The church, as seen from the Župné námestie square

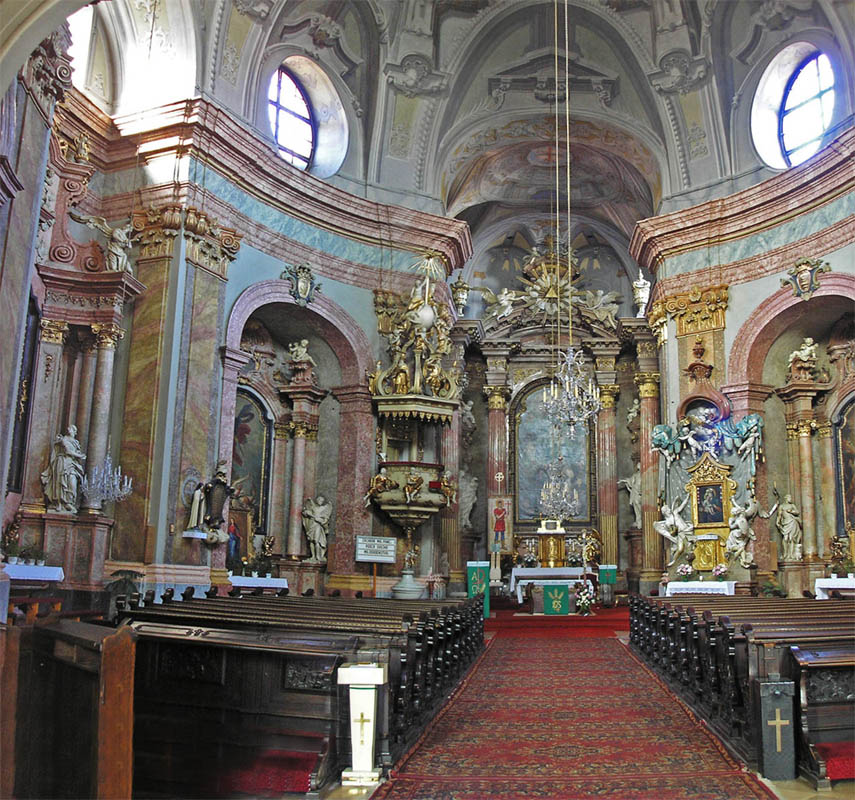
Interior of the Trinitarian Church in Bratislava

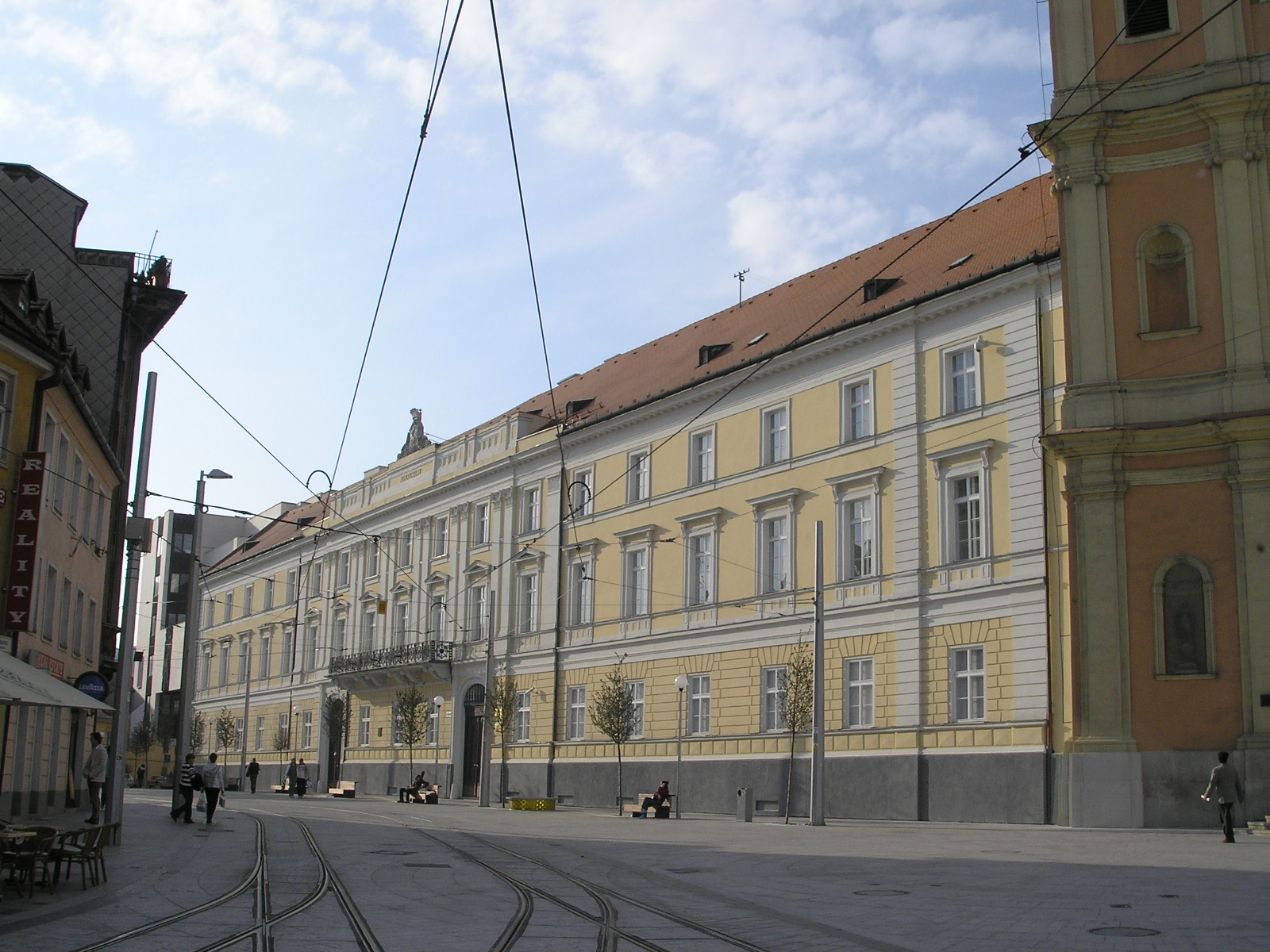
Image of the former monastery, now county house next to the church

The Trinitarian Church or Trinity Church, full name Church of Saint John of Matha and Saint Felix of Valois (Slovak: Kostol trinitárov, Trinitársky kostol or Trojičný kostol or Kostol svätého Jána z Mathy a svätého Felixa z Valois; incorrectly Holy Trinity Church (Kostol Najsvätejšej Trojice)), is a Baroque-style church in Bratislava's Old Town borough, on the Župné námestie square.

The church was built on the site of the older Church of St. Michael, which was demolished in 1529, along with the settlement of St. Michael, during the Ottoman wars, along with other suburbs, so as to see better the attacking Turks. The Trinitarian Order started construction of the church in 1717 and it was sanctified in 1727, although work in the interior continued into the first half of the 18th century.

== Description ==
The design is thought to be copied from the St. Peter's Church in Vienna. The arch is dominated by a cupola with trompe-l'œil fresco from Italian Baroque painter Antonio Galli Bibiena. The massive main altar of the church was presumably built by A. G. Bussi. Its main work of art is an altarpiece depicting St. John of Matha and St. Felix of Valois ransoming prisoners from Turkish capture. Statues of St. Agnes and St. Catherine situated at the rear of the main altar are attributed to the Bavarian sculptor Johann Baptist Straub. The rear altar of the Virgin Mary was built in 1736 on the order of the Count Zichy. This altar has a copy of the Regensburg painting of the Madonna. The main portal is richly decorated in Rococo style, celebrating the Holy Trinity.

== History ==
At the time of the consecration of the church, a Trinitarian monastery was built on the site of a nearby cemetery. However, the Trinitarian Order was closed by Joseph II in 1782 and the comitatus (county) office took possession of the building. However, it did not suit its needs and was almost wholly demolished; the "County House/Building" (Slovak: Župný dom, Hungarian: Vármegyeháza) was built in 1844 in its place and became the administrative seat of the Pressburg county. Concerts by various composers, for example by Franz Liszt or Johannes Brahms, took place in the Great Hall of the building.

From 1939 to 1994 Slovak National Councils (since 1992 National Council of the Slovak Republic) were housed in the building until the seat was moved into a new parliamentary building next to Bratislava Castle. Some of the notable political events that took place here included Tiso's government declaration of independent Slovakia on 14 March 1939 and the passing of the independence declaration on 17 July 1992.

From 2003 to 2009, the church was the cathedral of the Military Ordinariate of Slovakia.

== See also ==
- 18th-century Western domes
- Old Town, Bratislava
