= Schöner Náci =

Slovak entertainer

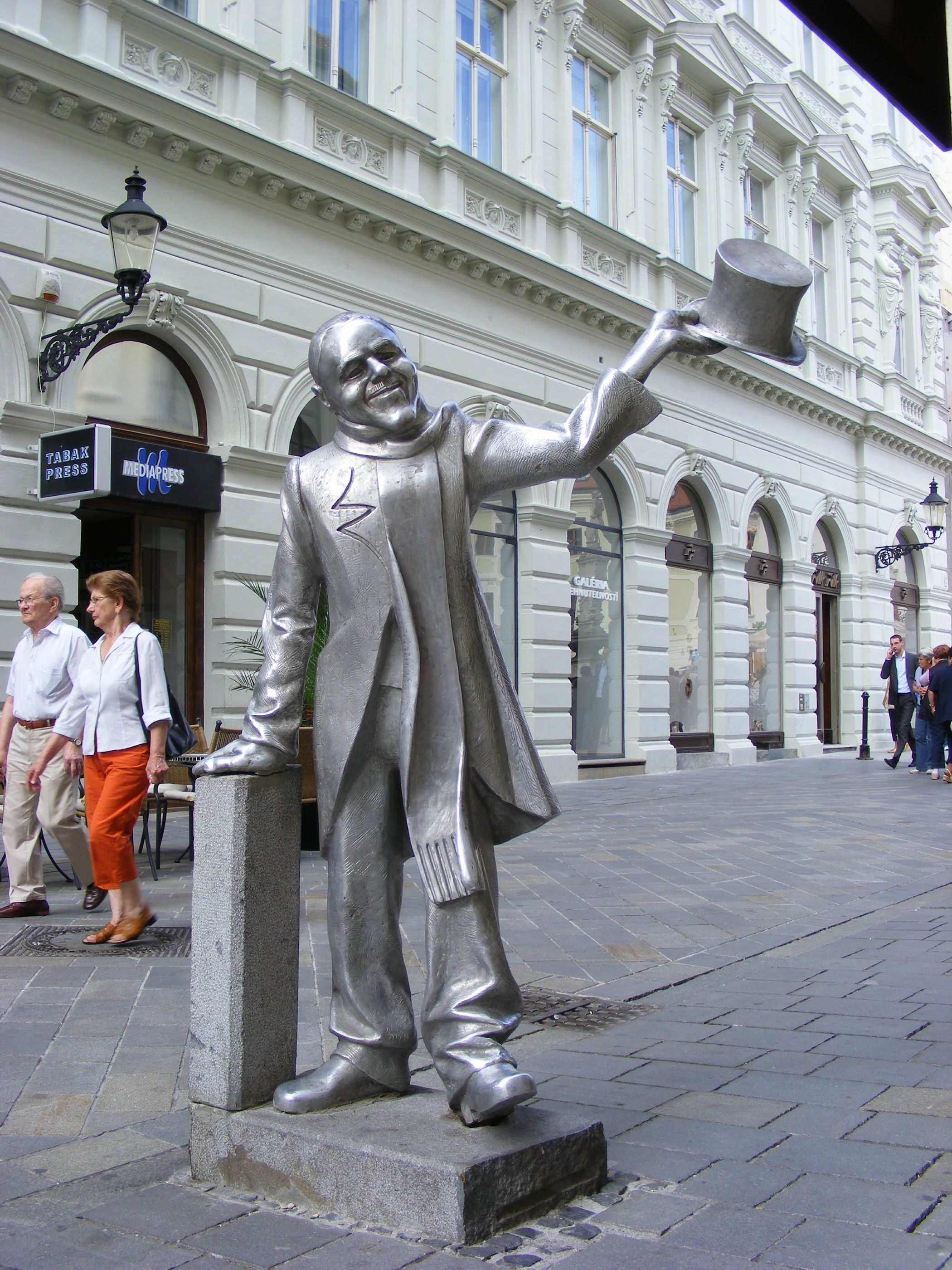
The statue of Schöner Náci by Kaffee Mayer

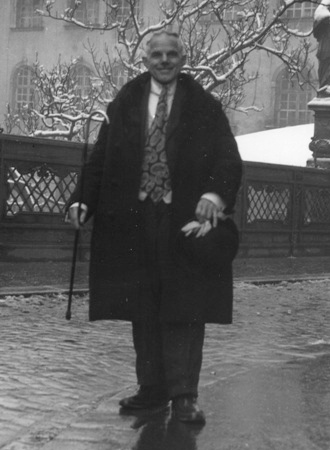
Schöner Náci himself in 1960

Schöner Náci or Schöne Náci (real name Ignác Lamár) was a renowned Bratislava character (German: Stadtoriginal) of the mid-20th century.

He was born in Petržalka on 11 August 1897 (then Hungary), and died of tuberculosis in Lehnice on October 23, 1967 (then Czechoslovakia). He was originally buried in Lehnice, but his remains were reburied in Bratislava's Ondrejský cemetery on September 2, 2007.

Schöner Náci was the son of a shoemaker and grandson of a famous clown, also Ignác Lamár, and was inspired by the latter's example to bring happiness to the streets of the city. He walked around the Old Town and in particular the stretch from Michael's Gate to the river, in top hat and tails, greeting women with the words, “I kiss your hand” in German, Hungarian and Slovak. He received free food from several of the city's cafes, and supported himself with occasional cleaning work.
