= Aspremont Summer Palace =

- Aspremontov letný palác
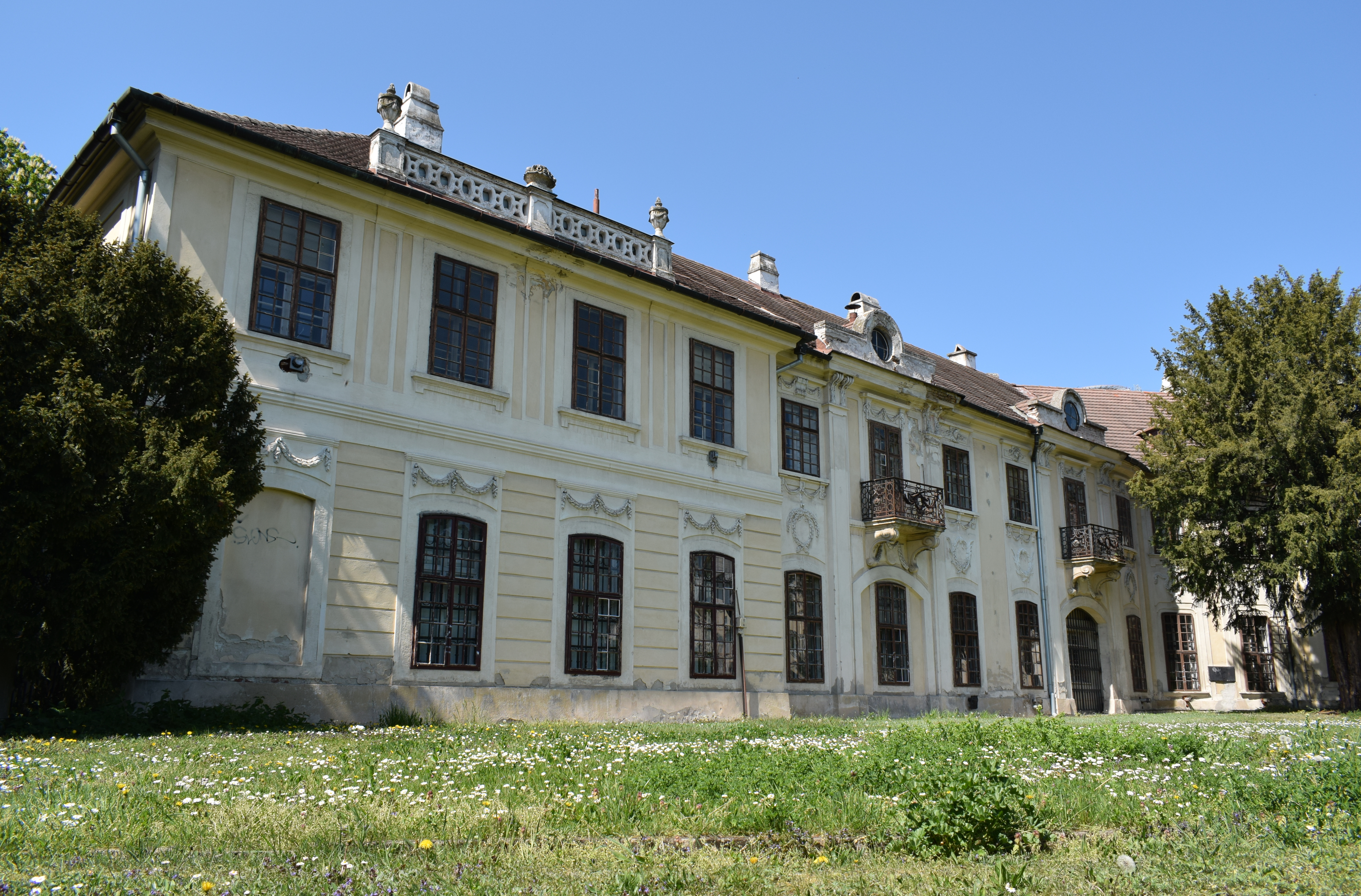
- View from Medical Garden

General information
- Type: Baroque palace
- Location: Bratislava, Slovakia, Špitálska ulica 24, 811 08, Bratislava
- Coordinates: 48°09′01″N 17°07′03″E
- Current tenants: Faculty of Medicine, Comenius University
- Completed: 1770

Technical details
- Floor count: 1

Aspremont Summer Palace (Slovak: Aspremontov letný palác) is a baroque palace in the Old Town of Bratislava, Slovakia. It was built along with the Medical Garden in 1770 for Count Johann Nepomuk Gobert d'Aspremont-Lynden. Nowadays the palace houses the office of the dean of the Faculty of Medicine of Comenius University.

== Description ==
In 1769 Count Johann Nepomuk Gobert d'Aspremont-Lynden bought the land in what is today Bratislava and in 1770 he had the palace built according to a design by the architect Johann Joseph Thaler. Count d'Aspremont-Lynden was a descendant of the famous Hungarian magnate families of Rákóczi and Báthory. In 1781, the palace and the garden became the property of Count Esterházy. In the second half of the 19th century, the property was bought by the Jankovits family and in 1862 by the Bratislava merchant Karol Schiffbeck. As a result, for much of history the palace was commonly known as Esterházy or Schiffbeck Palace. The Schiffbeck family gifted the palace to the Faculty of Medicine of Comenius University.

The palace façades and interiors were influenced by the décor of Louis XVI. It contains motifs of laurel wreaths, ribbon garlands and medallions, which are preserved especially well in the ceremonial hall. The palace also includes a late baroque style chapel featuring paintings depicting Old and New Testament allegory, plus an Altar of the Crucifixion fashioned from white and red marble.

== See also ==
- Old Town, Bratislava
- Grassalkovich Palace
- Medical Garden
