= Old Town, Bratislava =

Old Town Staré Mesto Óváros Altstadt
- Borough
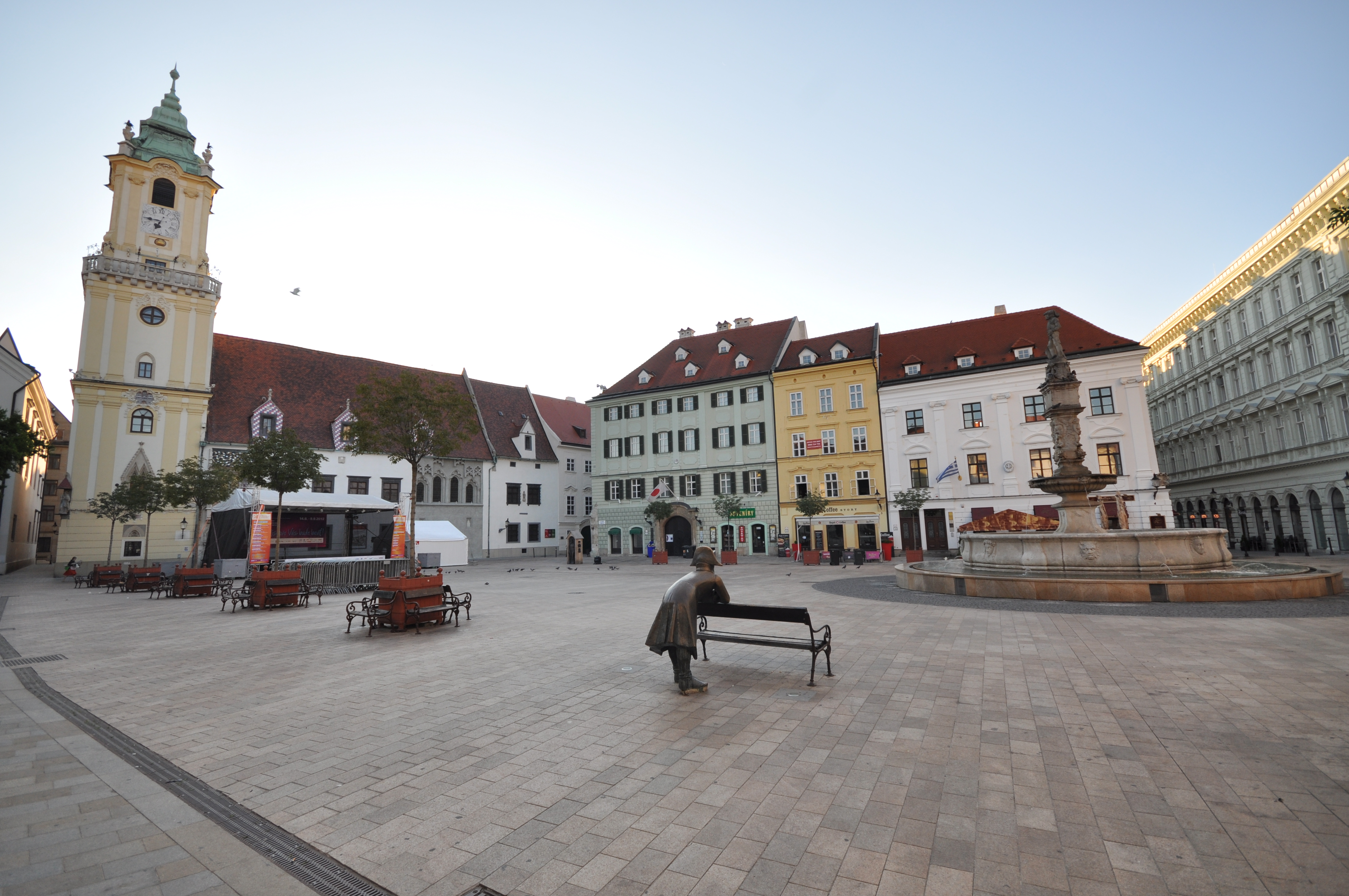
- Bratislava's main square

- Flag Coat of arms

- Area of Staré Mesto in Bratislava

- Location of Staré Mesto in Slovakia
- Coordinates: 48°08′36″N 17°06′27″E
- Country: Slovakia
- Region: Bratislava Region
- District: Bratislava I
- First mentioned: 907

Government
  - Mayor: Matej Vagač

Area
  - Total: 9.59 km^{2} (3.70 sq mi)
- Elevation: 138 m (453 ft)

Population (2025)
  - Total: 47,896
- Time zone: UTC+1 (CET)
  - Summer (DST): UTC+2 (CEST)
- Postal code: 811 0X
- Area code: +421-2
- Website: www.staremesto.sk

The Old Town of Bratislava (Slovak: Staré Mesto, Hungarian: Óváros, German: Altstadt) is the historic center and one of the boroughs of Bratislava, in the Bratislava Region of Slovakia. It is coextensive with the smallest Slovak administrative district by area, Bratislava I. It contains the small, but preserved medieval city center, Bratislava Castle and other important landmarks. Bratislava's Old Town is known for its many churches, the Bratislava Riverfront and cultural institutions, it is also the location of most of the foreign states embassies and important Slovak institutions including the National Council of the Slovak Republic; the Summer Archbishop's Palace, seat of the Government of Slovakia; and Grassalkovich Palace, seat of the President of Slovakia.

== Location ==
The Old Town is bordered by the river Danube to the west, Karlova Ves to the north, the New Town to the north and east, and Ružinov to the east and south.

The municipality lies at an altitude of 138 metres (453 ft) and covers an area of 9.59 km^{2} (3.70 sq mi) (2025).

=== Division ===
The Old Town is divided into several local parts: the historical center, Vydrica, Zukermandel, Blumentál, and others. Some of the local parts were demolished by the Communist government after World War II, including Vydrica and Zukermandel.

== Characteristics ==
As its name suggests, the district houses many historic monuments and Bratislava's central institutions. It also contains many Slovak governmental offices and institutions, such as the Ministry of Interior, the Ministry of Culture, and the Ministry of Justice.

The western part of the district is a hilly area (technically part of the Small Carpathians mountain range) featuring Bratislava Castle, the Slavín monument, Horský park (literally Mountain(ous) Park), many detached houses, and most of the foreign embassies in Slovakia. The hilly area ends in the south at the Danube with the Chatam Sofer Memorial and the Bratislava Castle hill, and in the west at the D2 Motorway. This part of Bratislava is more quiet than the other parts of the city's Old Town and, apart from the castle, it is seldom visited by tourists.

The eastern section is the historical and administrative center. Notable buildings and spaces include the Grassalkovich Palace, Trinity Church, Bratislava's Town Hall, St. Martin's Cathedral, Michael's Gate, the Primate's Palace, Comenius University, the main railway station (Hlavná stanica), the Slovak National Theatre (both the old and new sites), SNP Square, the Main Square (Hlavné námestie), Hviezdoslav Square (Hviezdoslavovo námestie), Kamenné námestie ('Stone Square'), Obchodná ulica ('Shop Street' equivalent to High Street), Pharmacy Salvator, Zochova Street from the 14th century and many other old churches and palaces. There are still some remnants of the medieval Bratislava city walls, although not open to the public for the time being.

== Population ==
Population statistic (10 years)
Year	1995	2005	2015	2025
Count	47,896	42,241	39,470	47,896
Difference		−11.80%	−6.55%	+21.34%

Population statistic
Year	2024	2025
Count	47,635	47,896
Difference		+0.54%

It has a population of 47,896 people (31 December 2025).

=== Ethnicity ===
Census 2021 (1+ %)
Ethnicity	Number	Fraction
Slovak	37,280	80.9%
Not found out	5982	12.98%
Hungarian	1283	2.78%
Czech	1014	2.2%
Other	999	2.16%
Total	46,080	

In year 2021 was 46,080 people by ethnicity 37,280 as Slovak, 5982 as Not found out, 1283 as Hungarian, 1014 as Czech, 999 as Other, 417 as German, 245 as Ukrainian, 232 as Russian, 228 as Jewish, 196 as Rusyn, 161 as Italian, 158 as French, 102 as Romani, 97 as Bulgarian, 87 as Polish, 82 as Austrian, 71 as Greek, 55 as Moravian, 55 as Croatian, 50 as Serbian, 41 as Romanian, 40 as English, 33 as Albanian, 25 as Vietnamese, 25 as Canadian, 22 as Turkish, 21 as Iranian, 17 as Irish, 17 as Korean, 9 as Chinese and 1 as Silesian.

Note on population: The difference values of population numbers in the table "Population statistic" and in the sections "Ethnicity" & "Religion" is caused by the use of various statistical methods.

=== Religion ===
Census 2021 (1+ %)
Religion	Number	Fraction
None	19,948	43.29%
Roman Catholic Church	15,008	32.57%
Not found out	5951	12.91%
Evangelical Church	2341	5.08%
Total	46,080	

In year 2021 was 46,080 people by religion 19,948 from None, 15,008 from Roman Catholic Church, 5951 from Not found out, 2341 from Evangelical Church, 458 from Greek Catholic Church, 319 from Eastern Orthodox Church, 303 from Other, 245 from Jewish community, 218 from Other and not ascertained christian church, 212 from Ad hoc movements, 195 from Buddhism, 162 from Calvinist Church, 131 from Church of the Brethren, 100 from Islam, 94 from Jehovah's Witnesses, 81 from Christian Congregations in Slovakia, 68 from Baptists Church, 56 from Apostolic Church, 36 from Paganism and natural spirituality, 35 from United Methodist Church, 30 from Czechoslovak Hussite Church, 30 from Seventh-day Adventist Church, 23 from Old Catholic Church, 19 from Hinduism, 12 from Bahá'i Community and 5 from Church of Jesus Christ of Latter-day Saints.

== Mayors ==
- 1990–1994 – Miloslava Zemková (DS)
- 1994–1998 – Andrej Ďurkovský (KDH)
- 1998–2002 – Andrej Ďurkovský (KDH)
- 2002–2006 – Peter Čiernik (KDH)
- 2006–2010 – Andrej Petrek (independent, later SDKÚ-DS, expelled in 2008)
- 2010–2014 – Tatiana Rosová (SDKÚ-DS)
- 2014–2018 – Radoslav Števčík (independent)
- 2018–2022 – Zuzana Aufrichtová
- 2022–2026 – Matej Vagač (coalition Progressive Slovakia | Team Bratislava)

== Twin towns ==
- Obrenovac, Serbia
- Olomouc, Czech Republic

== See also ==
Personalities

- Ignác Lamár

Tourism

- Eurovea City
- River Park
- List of palaces in Bratislava
- List of fountains in Bratislava
- List of castles in Slovakia
- Tourism in Slovakia

Other

- Old Town, Košice - An analogous borough in Slovakia's second largest city, Košice.

== Gallery ==
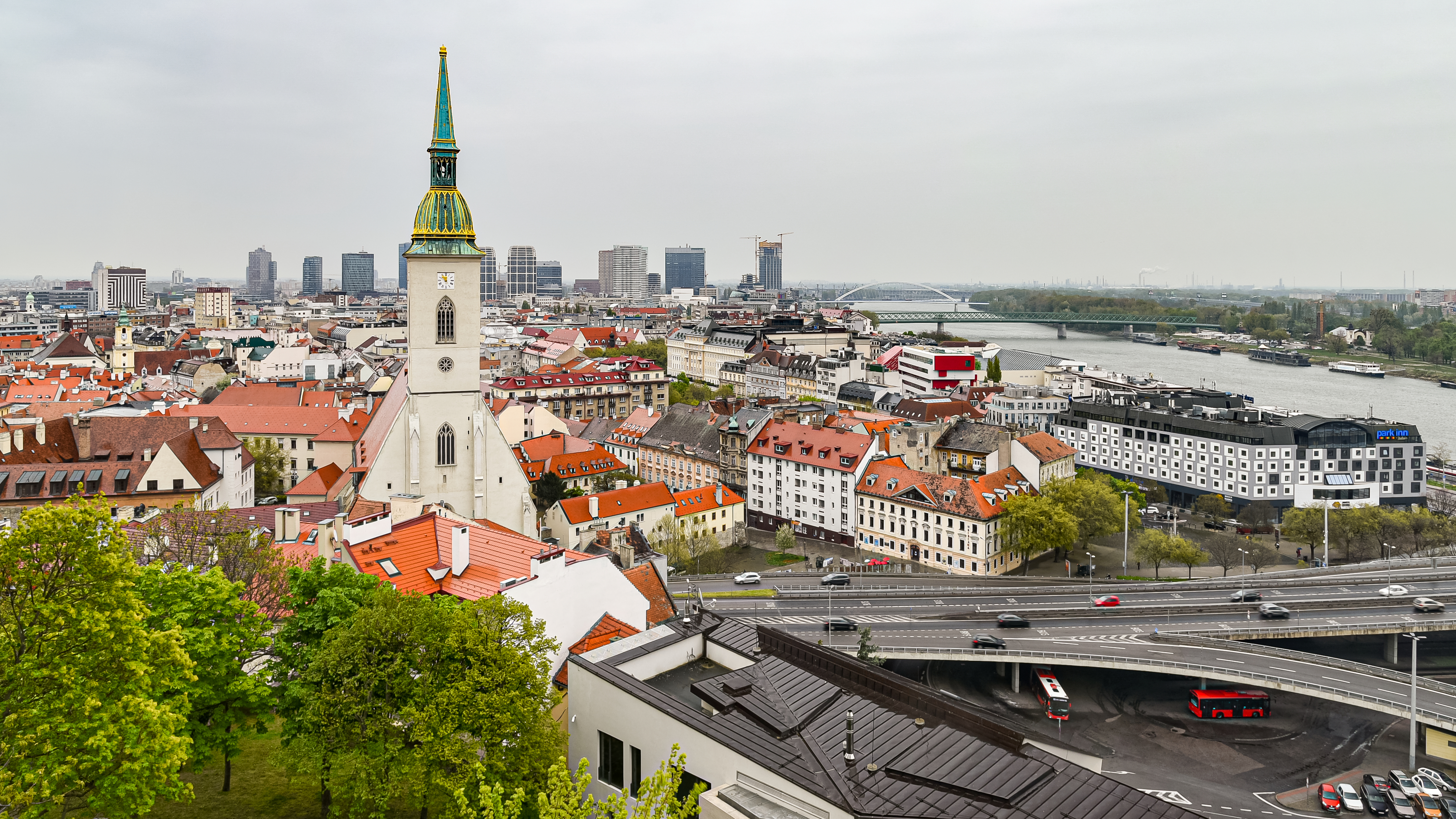
Old Town from the castle hill

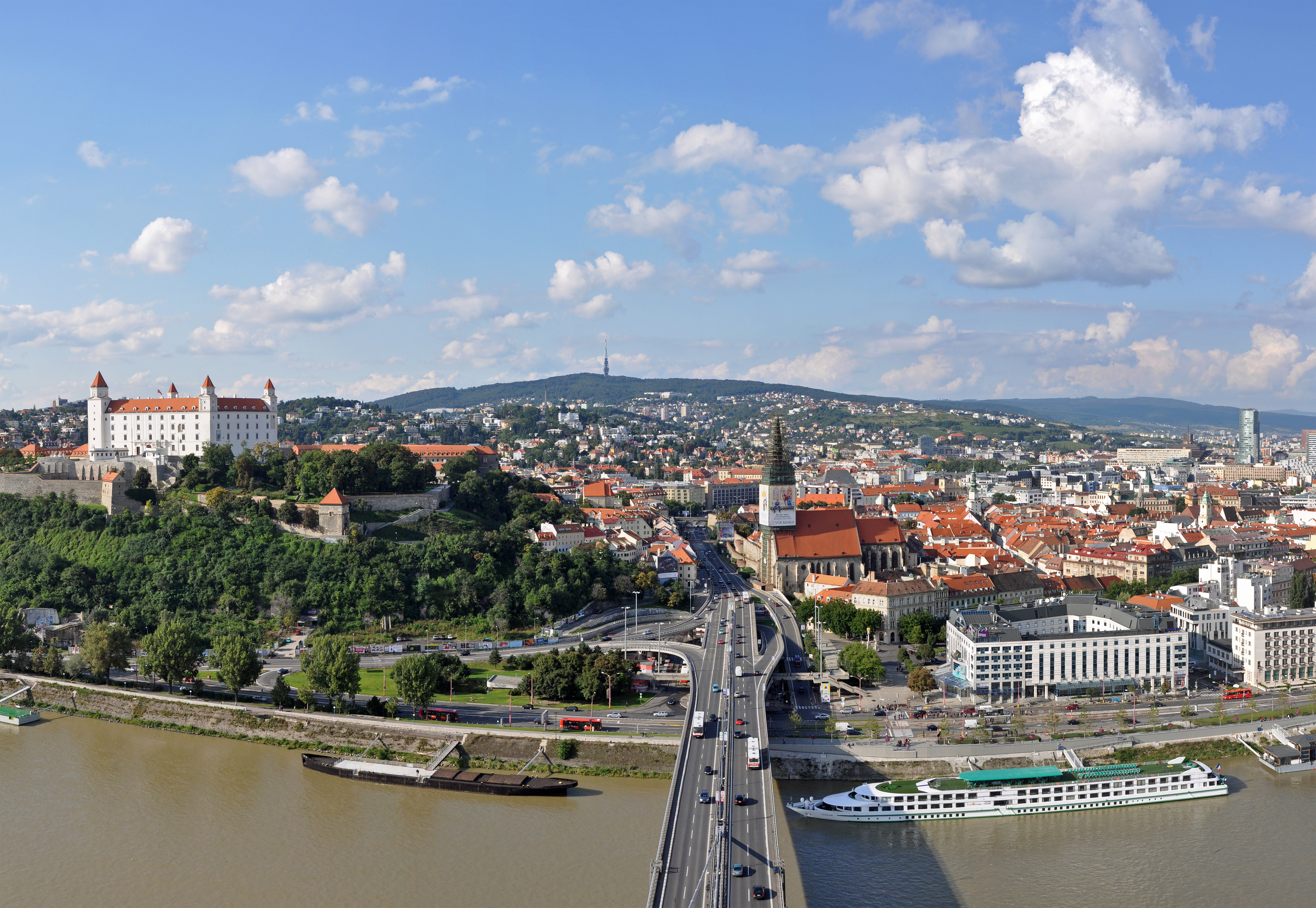
Old Town from the Nový Most bridge

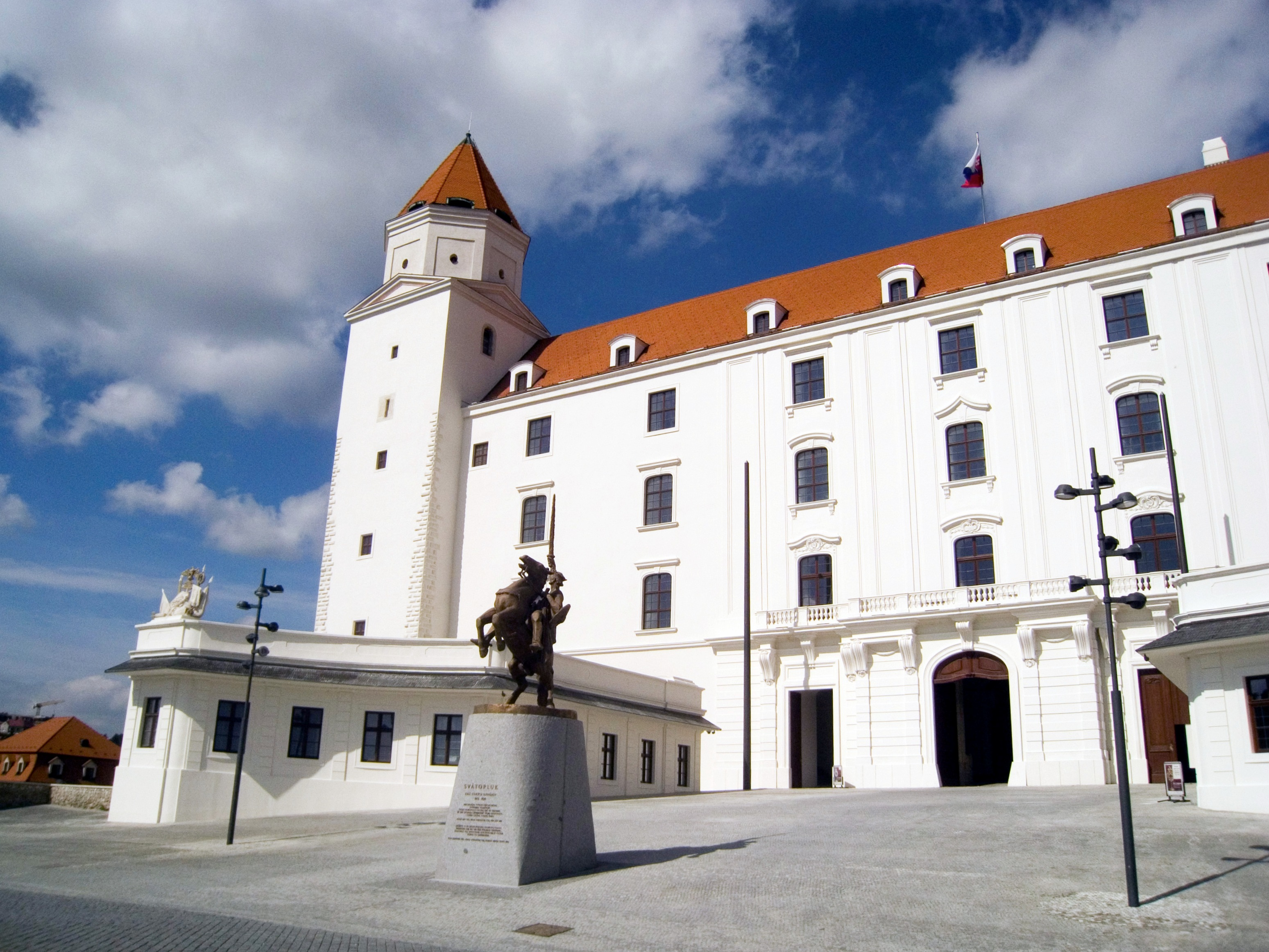
Main entrance of the Bratislava Castle

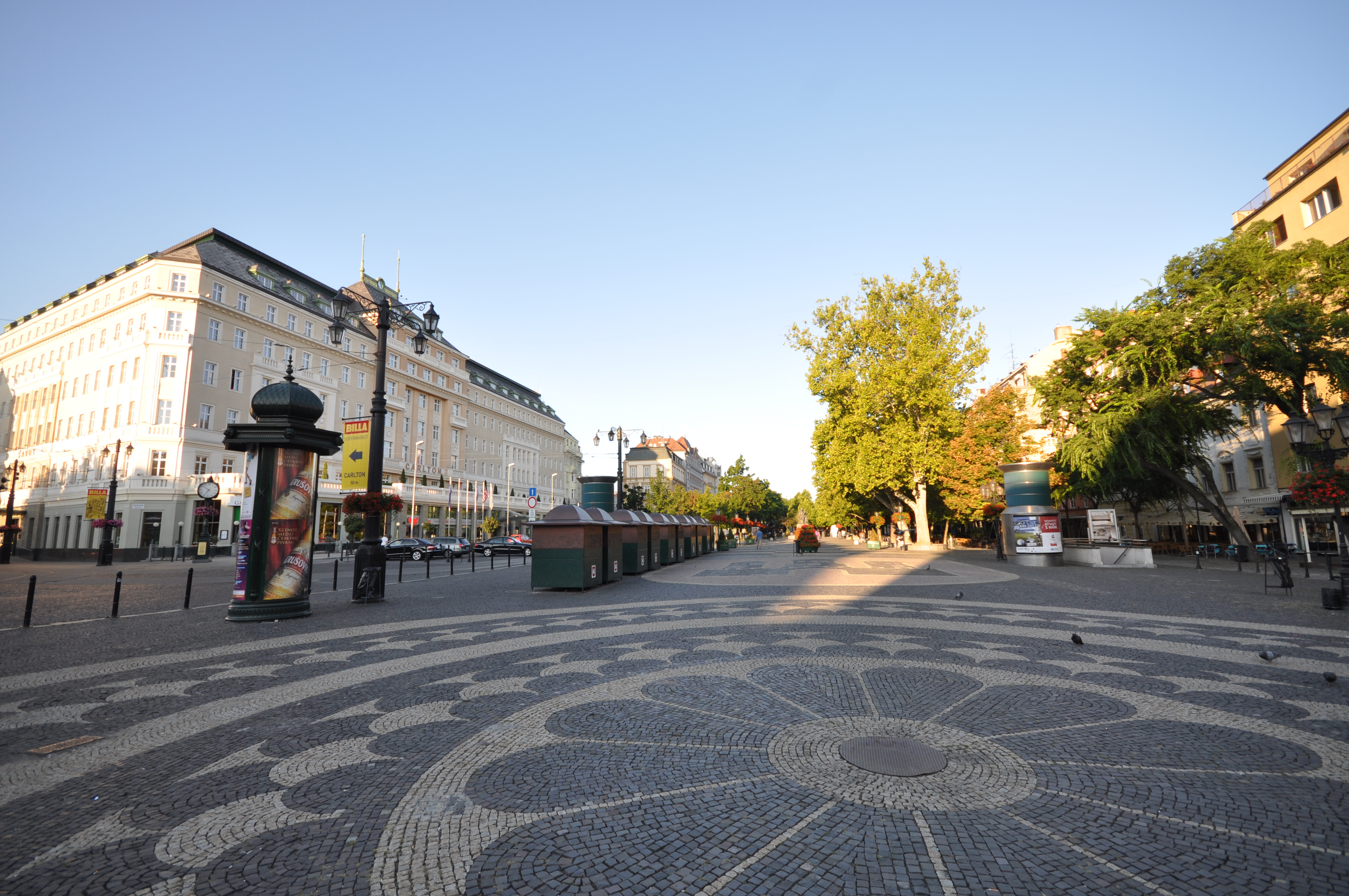
Hviezdoslav Square

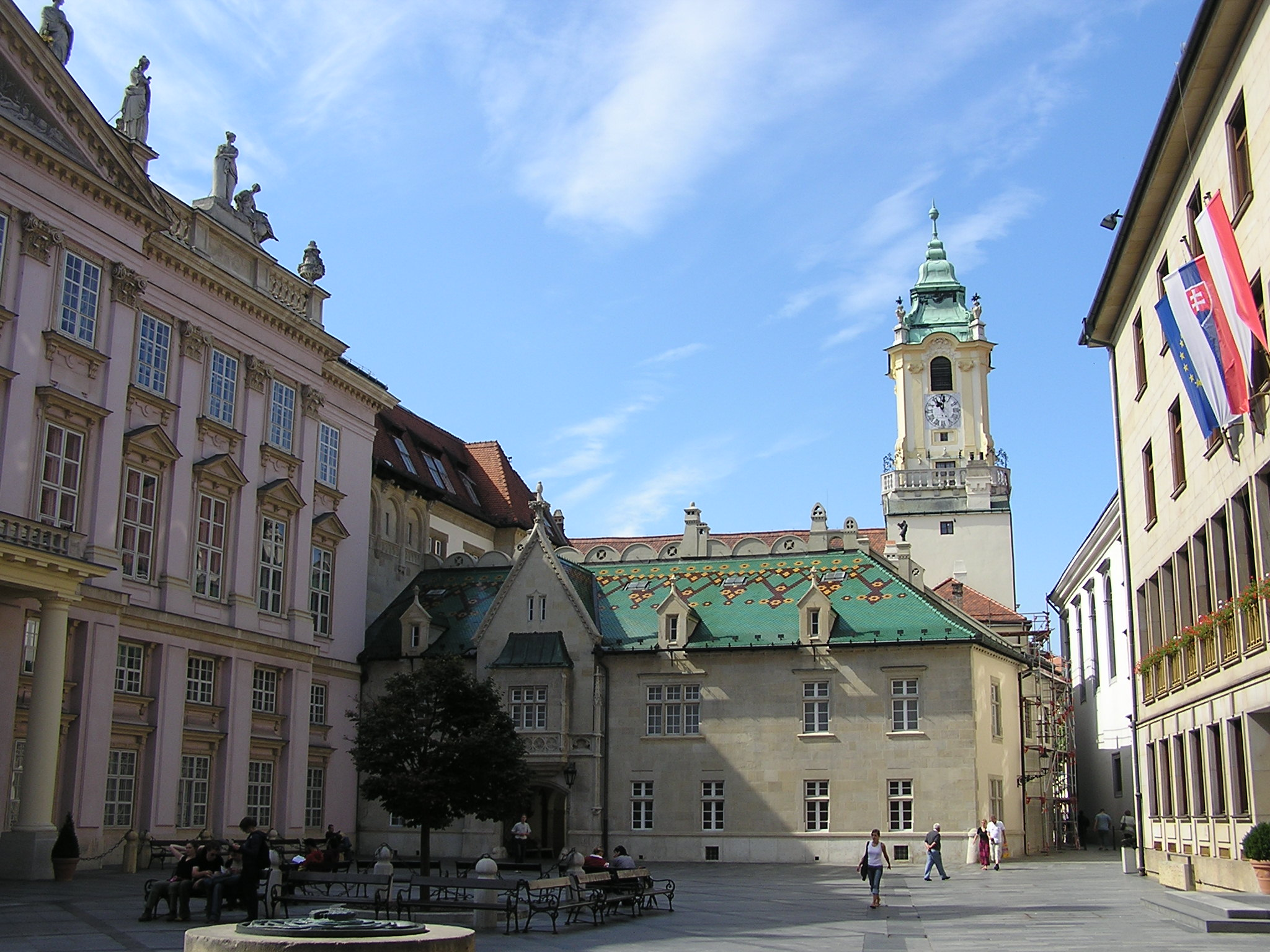
Primate's Square

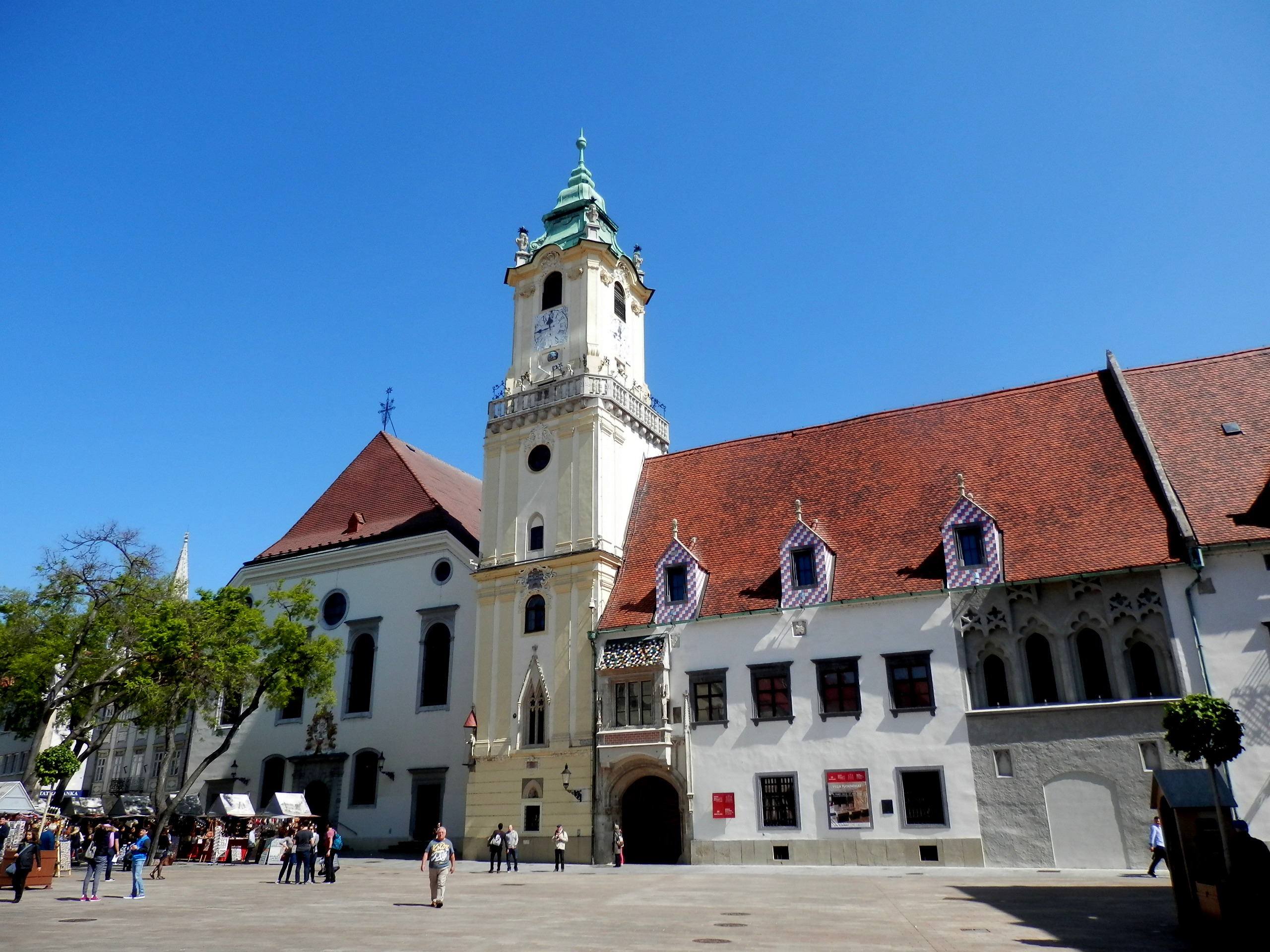
The Old Town Hall, the oldest city hall in the country

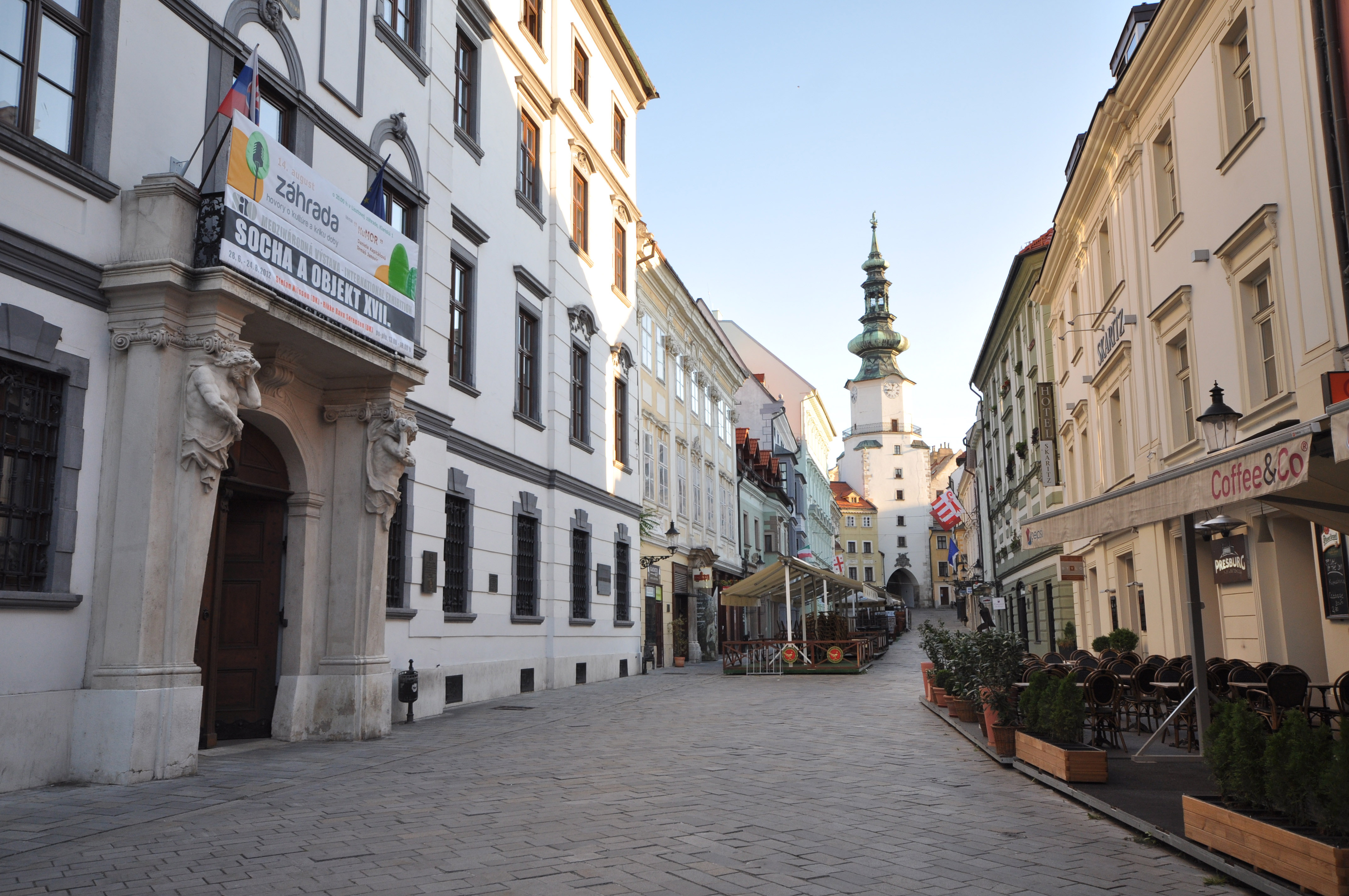
Michael's Gate

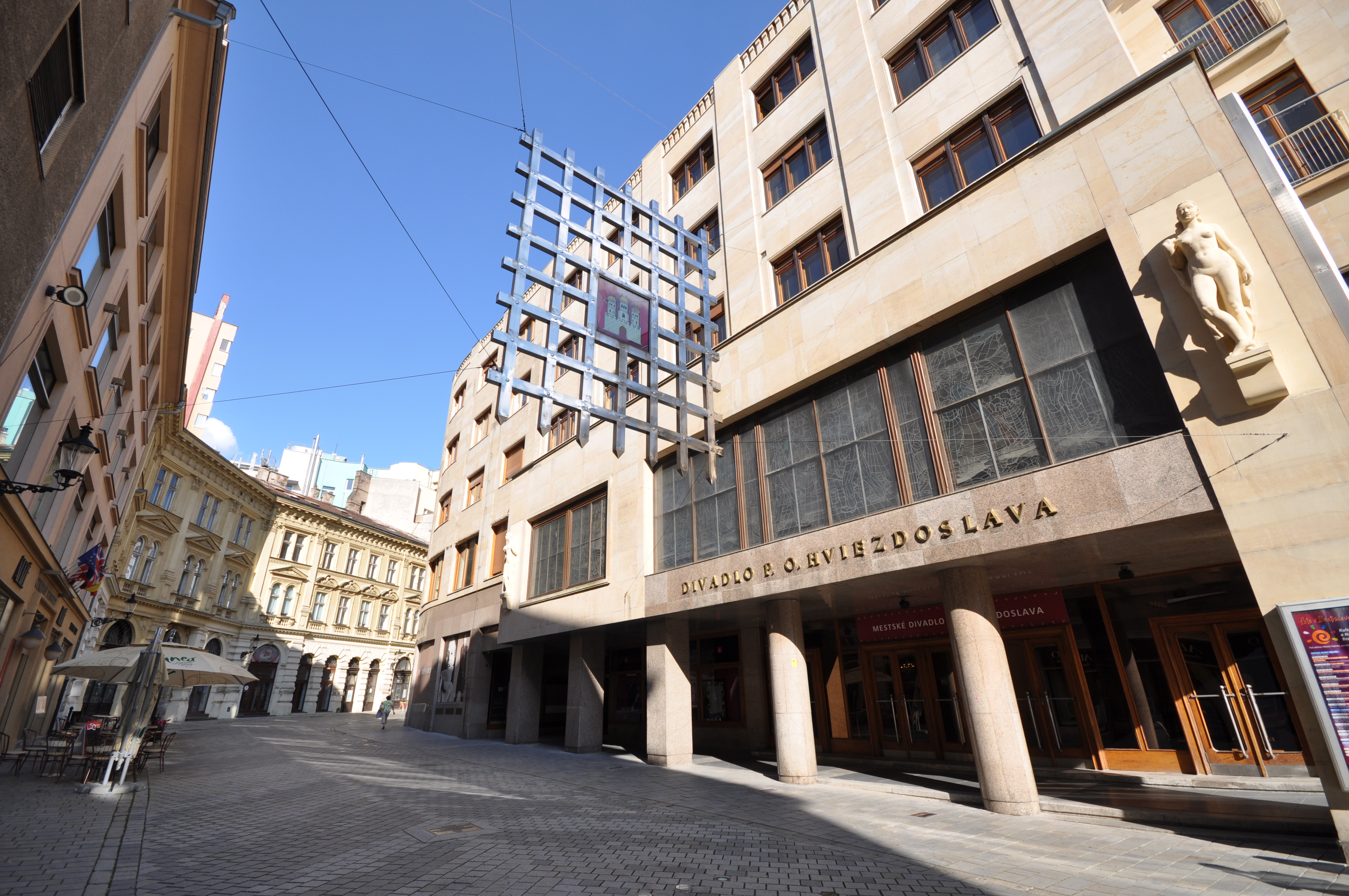
Laurinc Gate

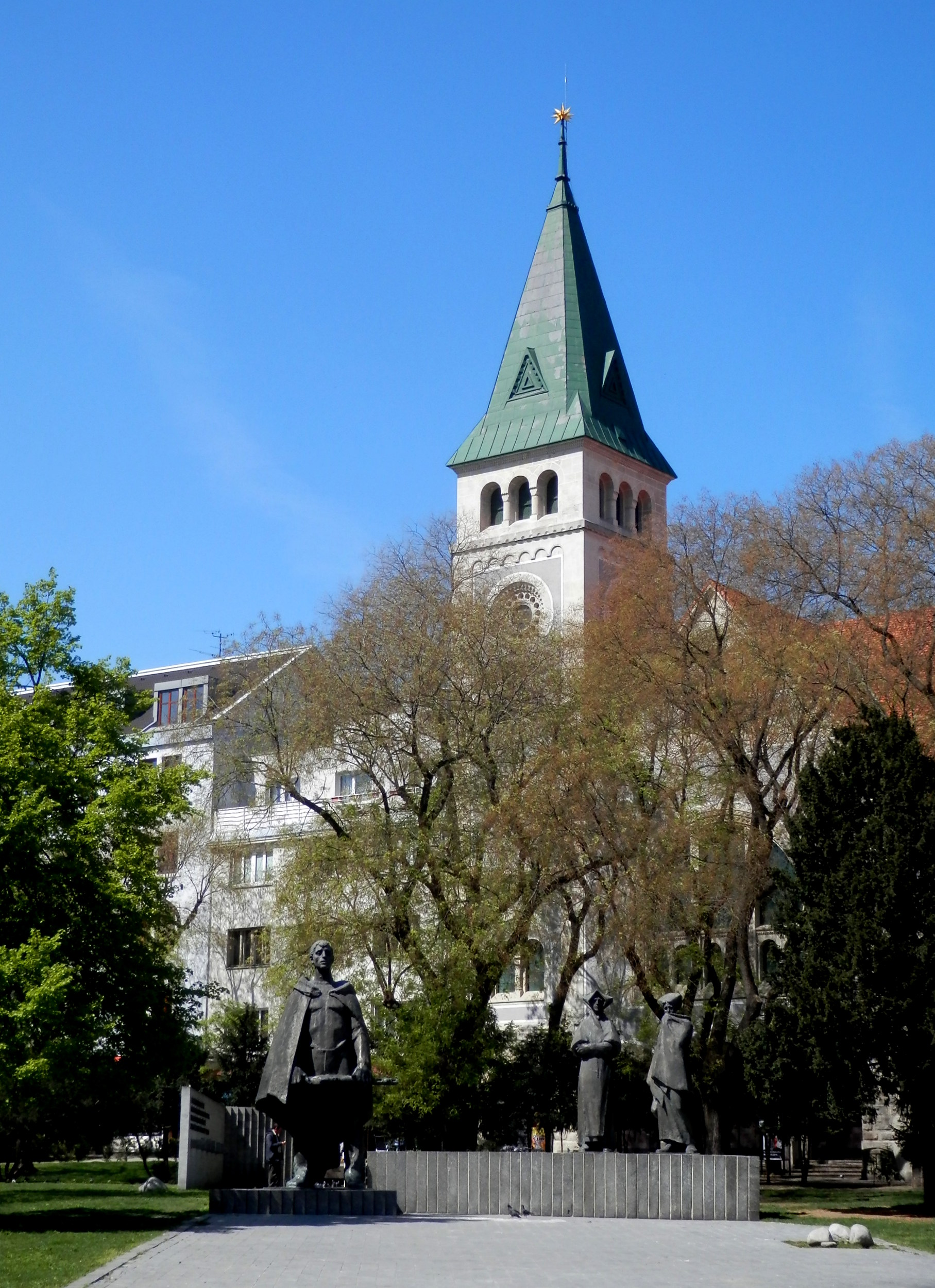
Reformed church

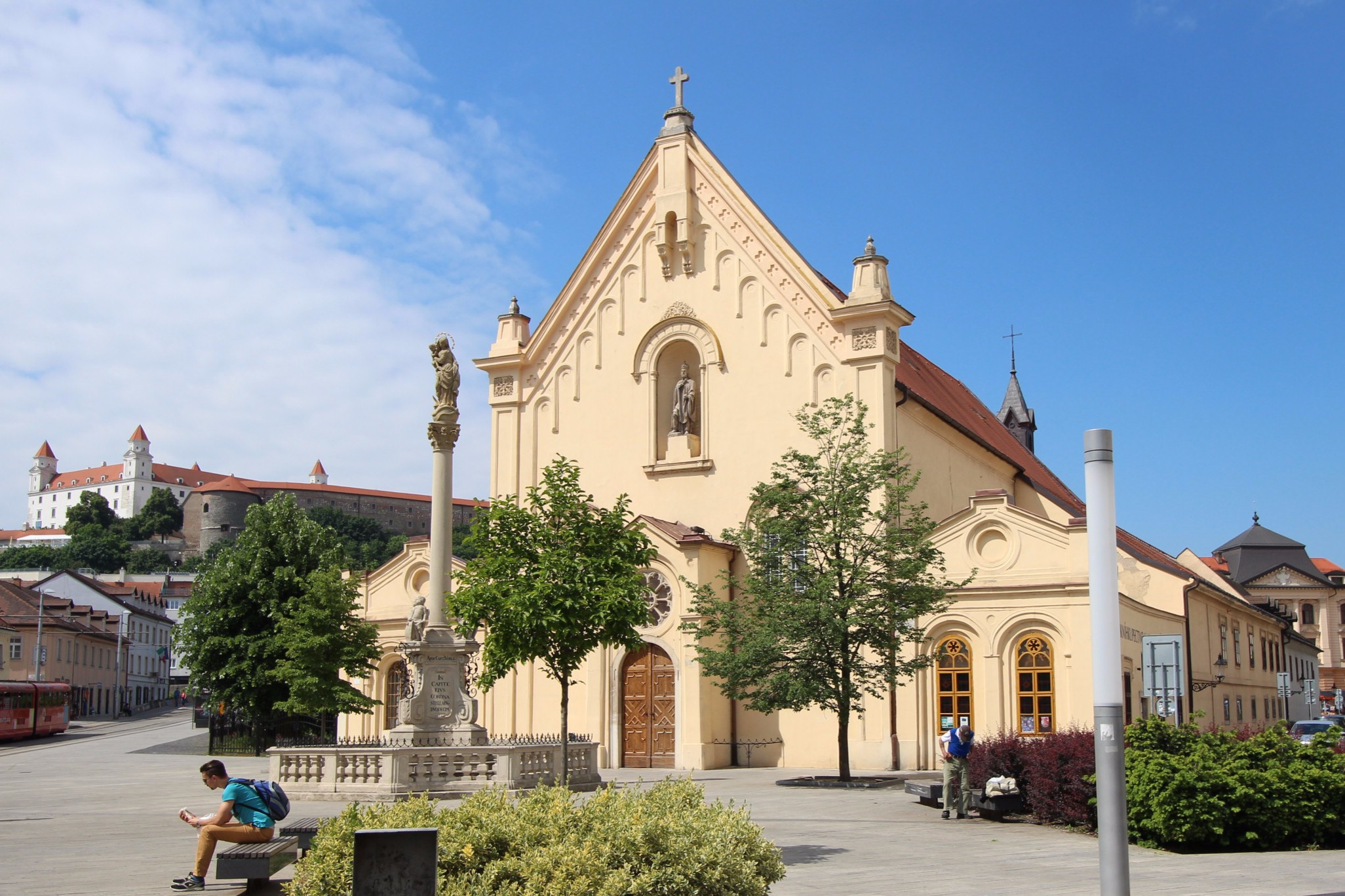
Church of Saint Stephen

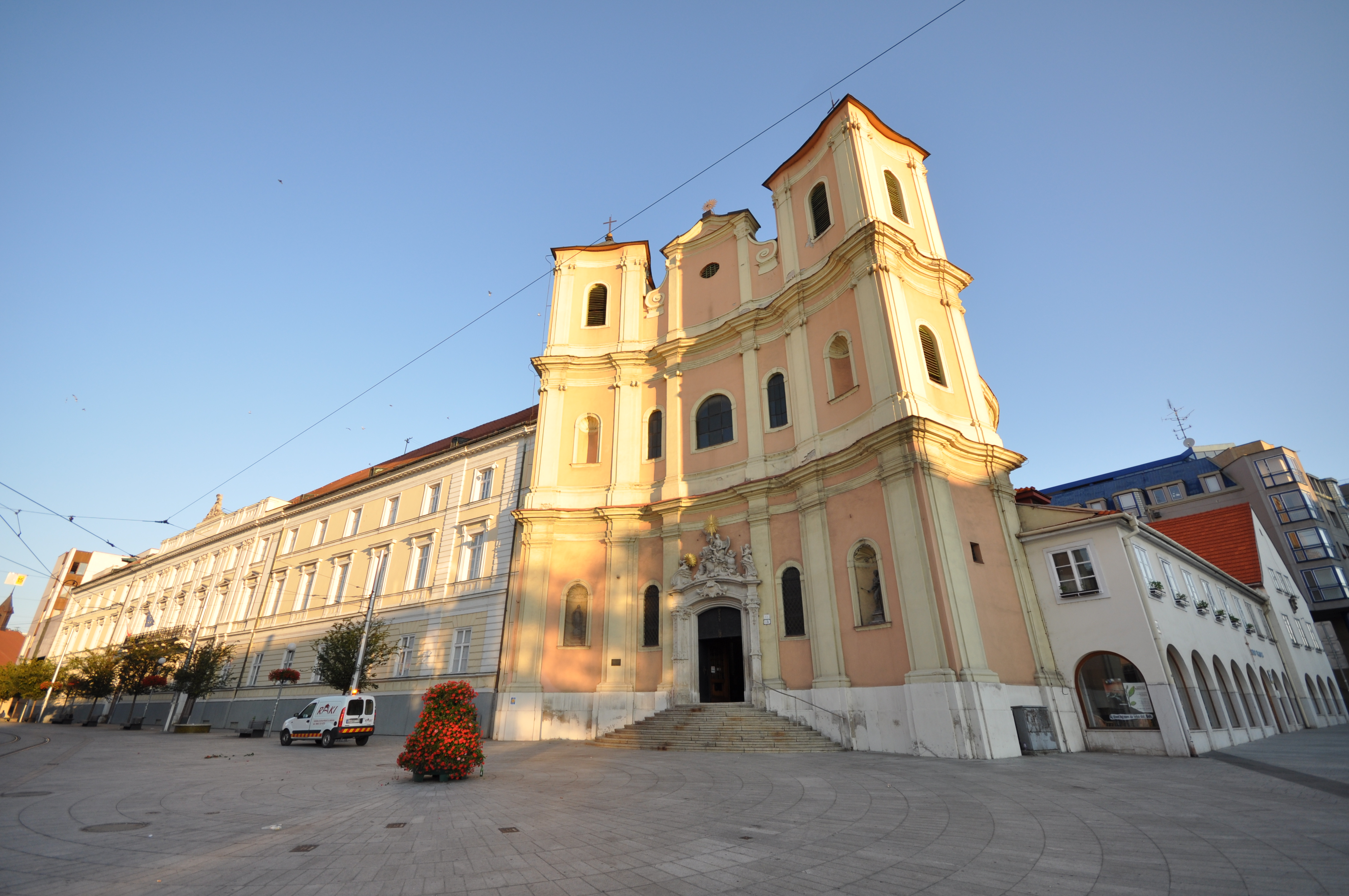
Trinitarian Church

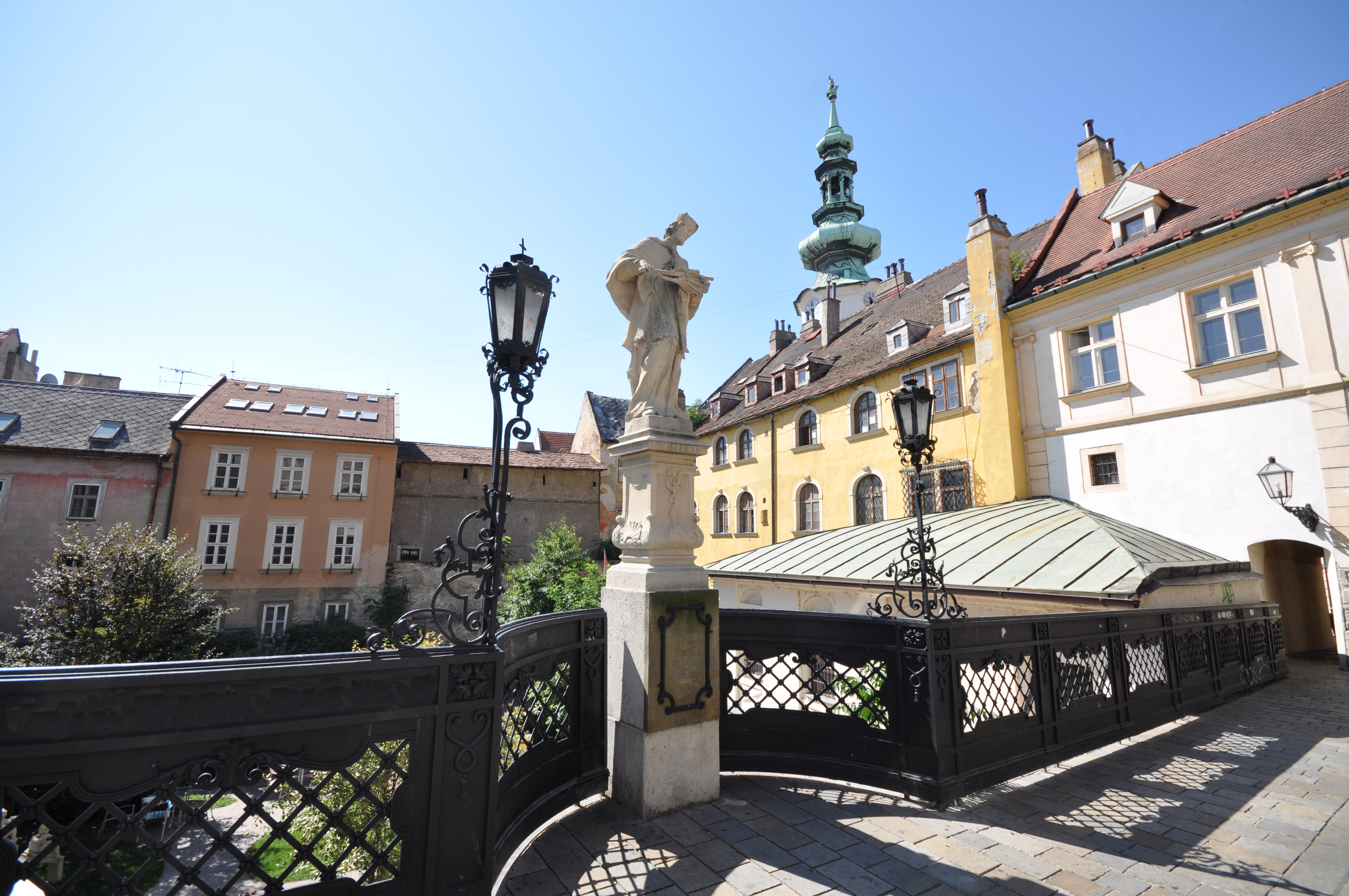
The Old Town of Bratislava

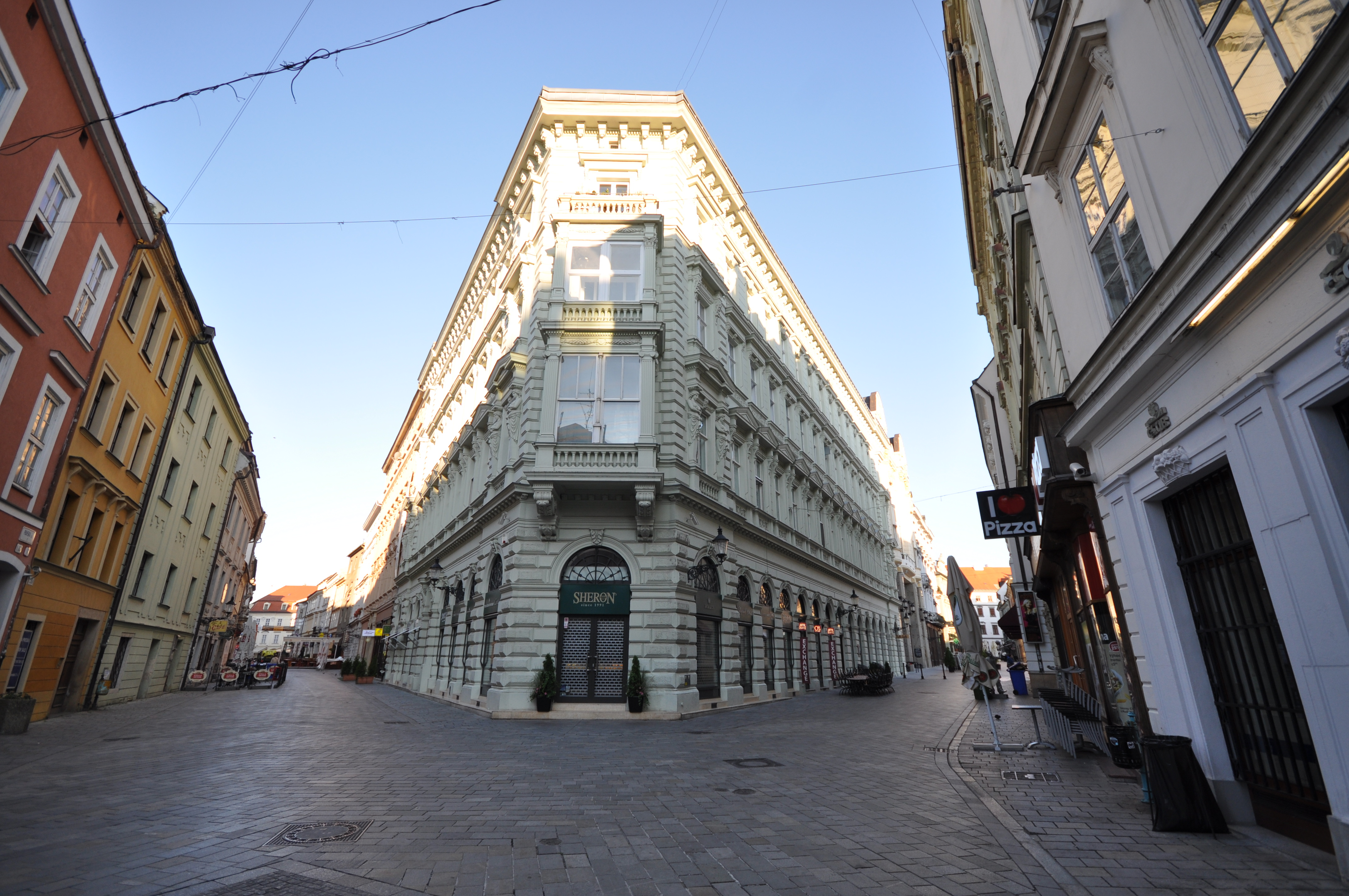
Streets of the Old Town

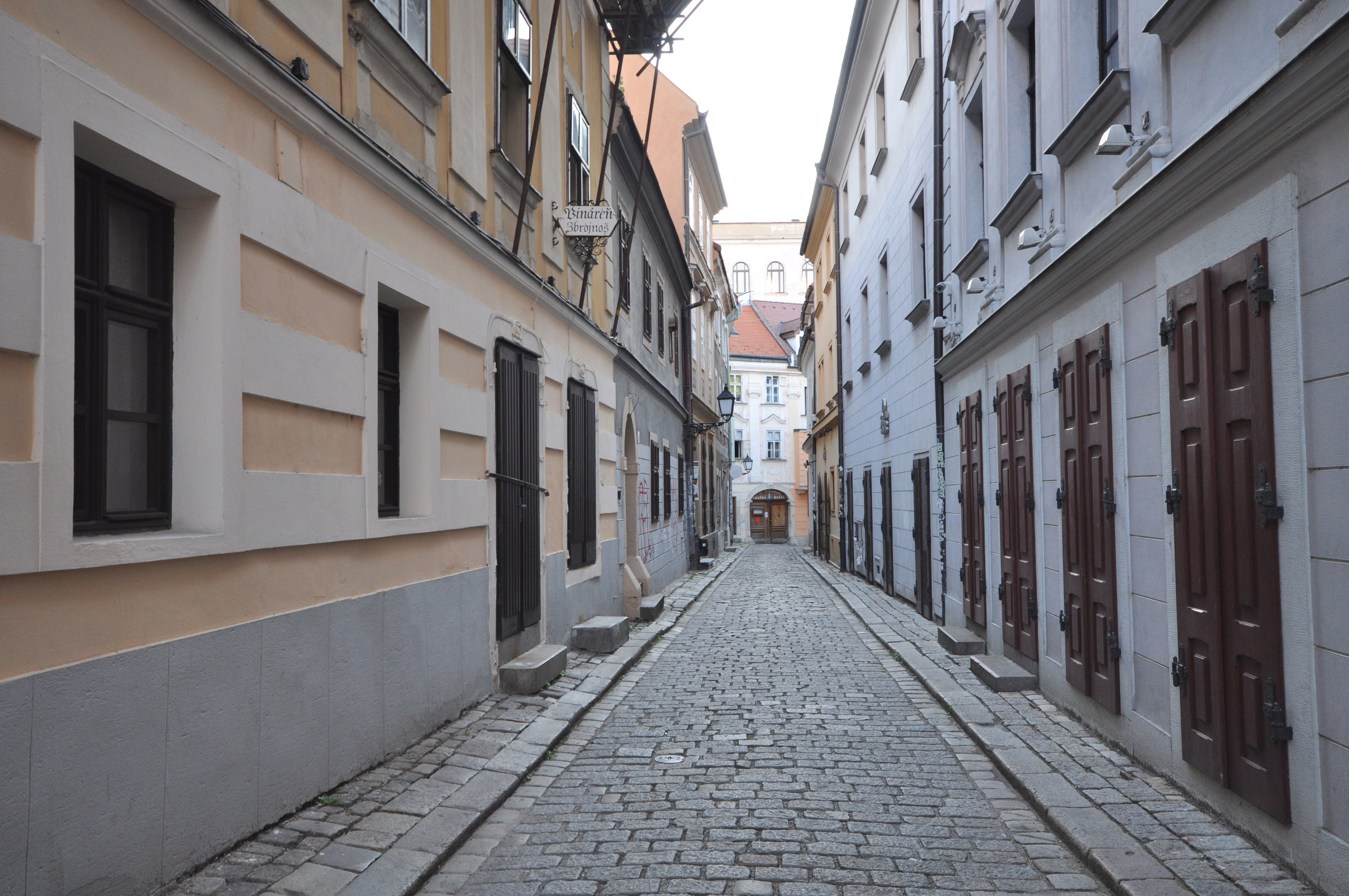
Bratislava Old Town

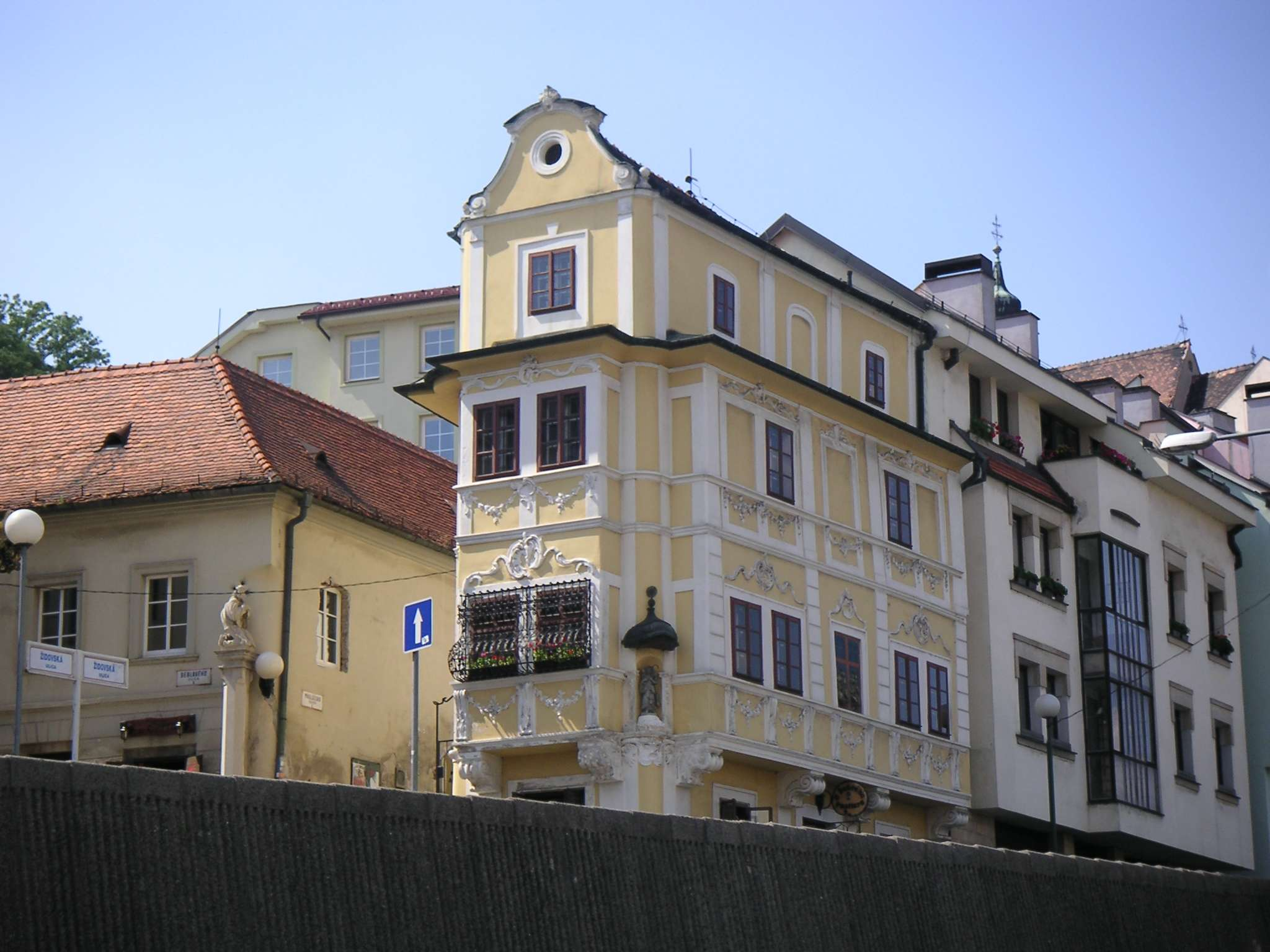
The Rococo-style "House of the Good Shepherd", home to the Museum of Clocks

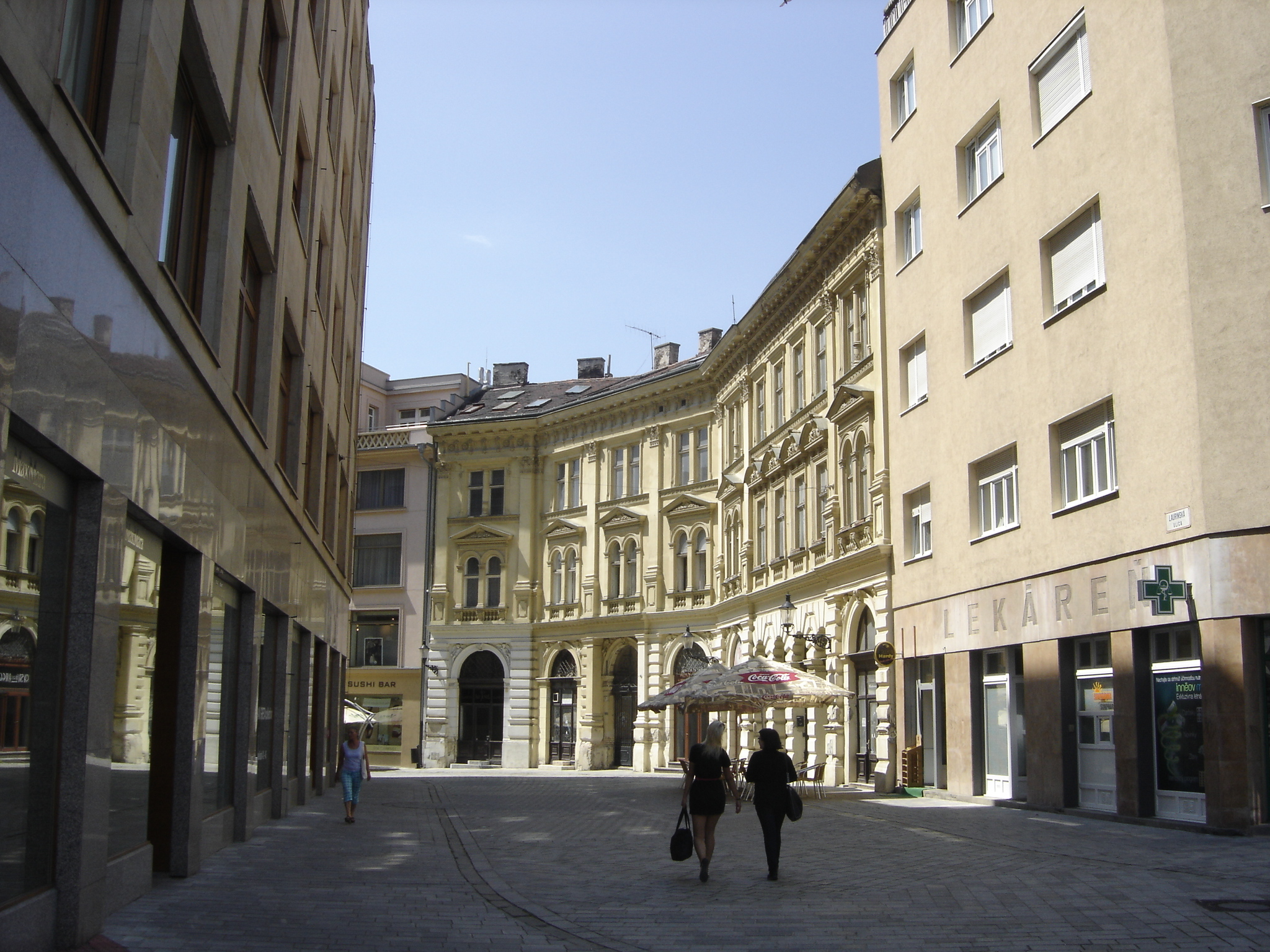
Laurinská Street

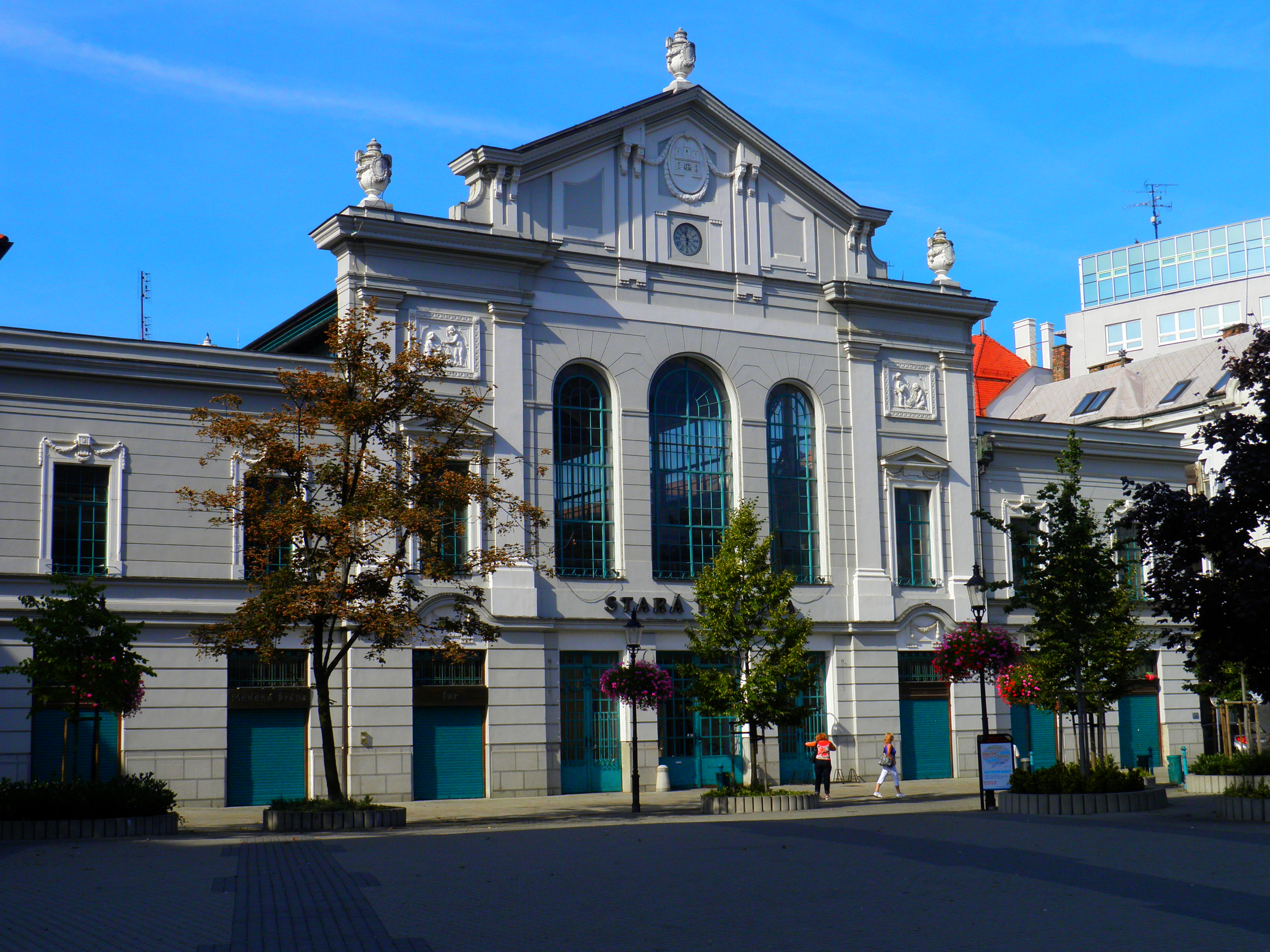
Stará Tržnica Market Hall, the oldest indoor market in Bratislava
