= SNP Square (Bratislava) =

Square in central Bratislava, Slovakia

Slovak National Uprising Square (SNP Square)
- Hungarian: A Szlovák Nemzeti Felkelés tere; German: Platz des Slowakischen Nationalaufstandes; Slovak: Námestie Slovenského Národného Povstania; Czech: Náměstí Slovenskího Národního Povstání
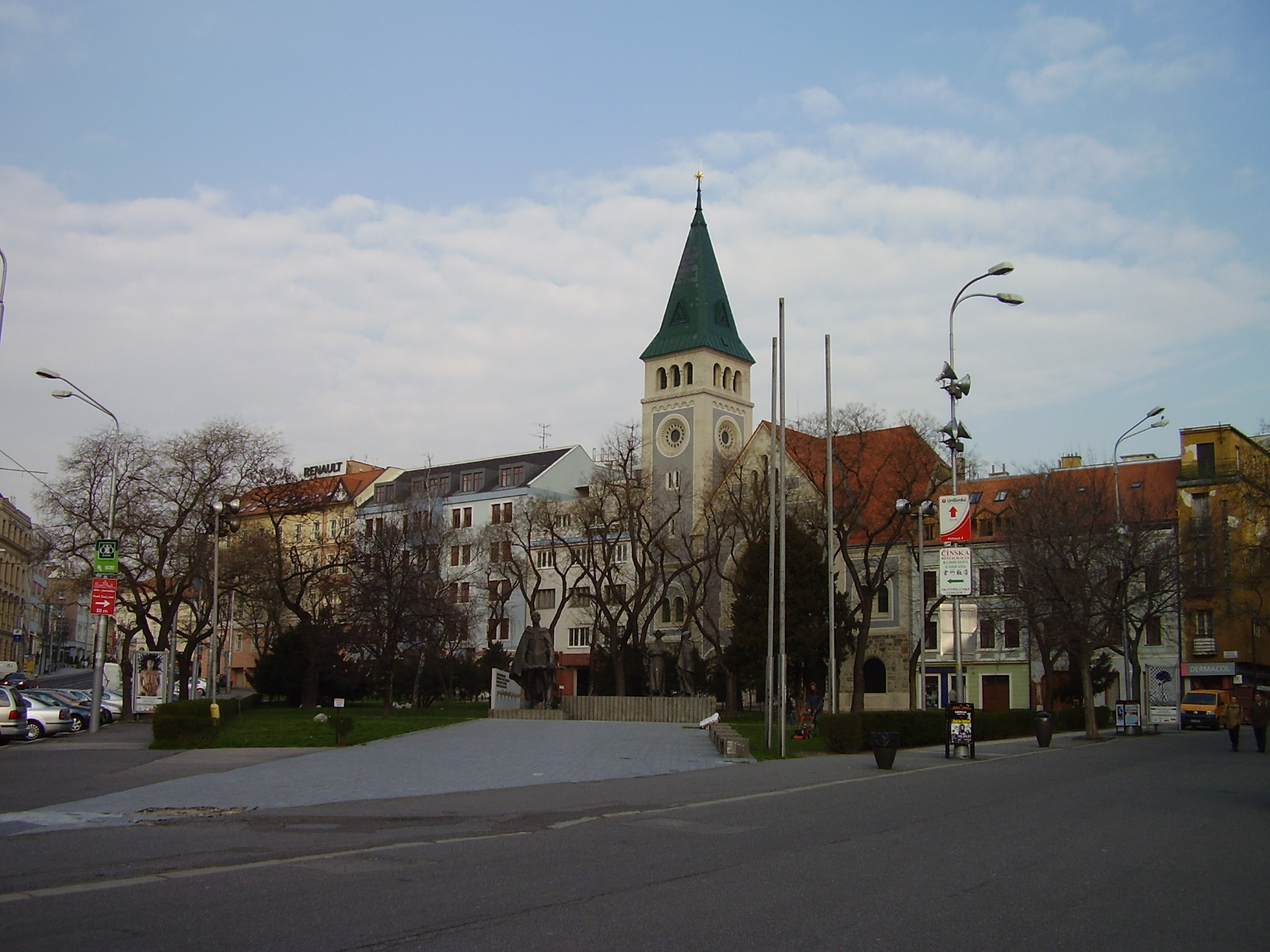
- SNP square

- Location within Slovakia
- Location: Slovakia
- Coordinates: 48.145466°N 17.110795°E

Slovak National Uprising Square (SNP square; Slovak: Námestie Slovenského národného povstania, shortcut: Námestie SNP or Nám. SNP) is a square in central Bratislava, Slovakia.

In the 20th century, it served as the focal point for national demonstrations for independence and sovereignty.

== Public transport ==
- Trams:
  - SNP square (Slovak: Námestie SNP): 1, 7, 8, 9
  - Stone square (Slovak: Kamenné námestie): 3, 4, 7, 9

== Gallery ==
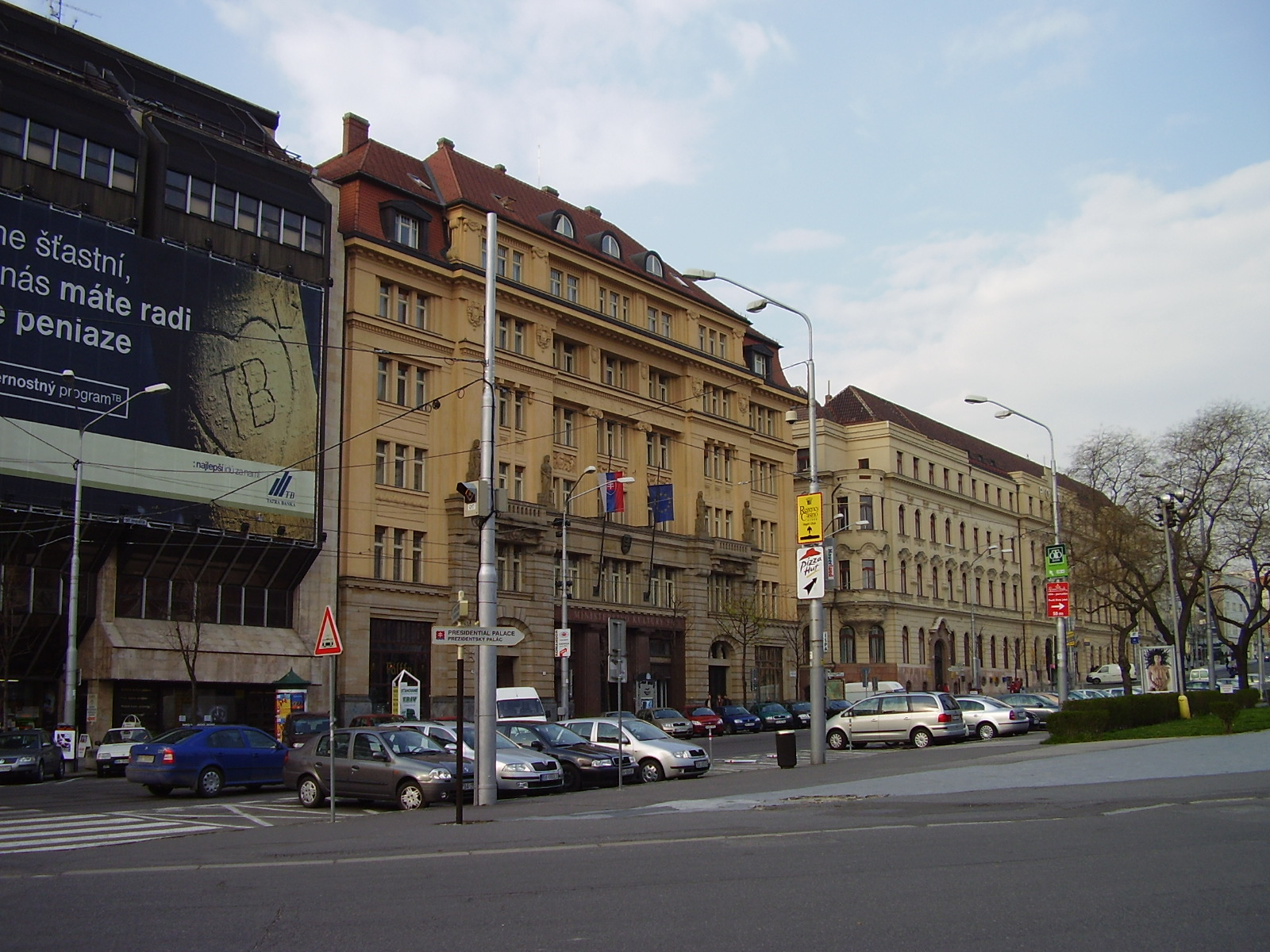
The SNP square street

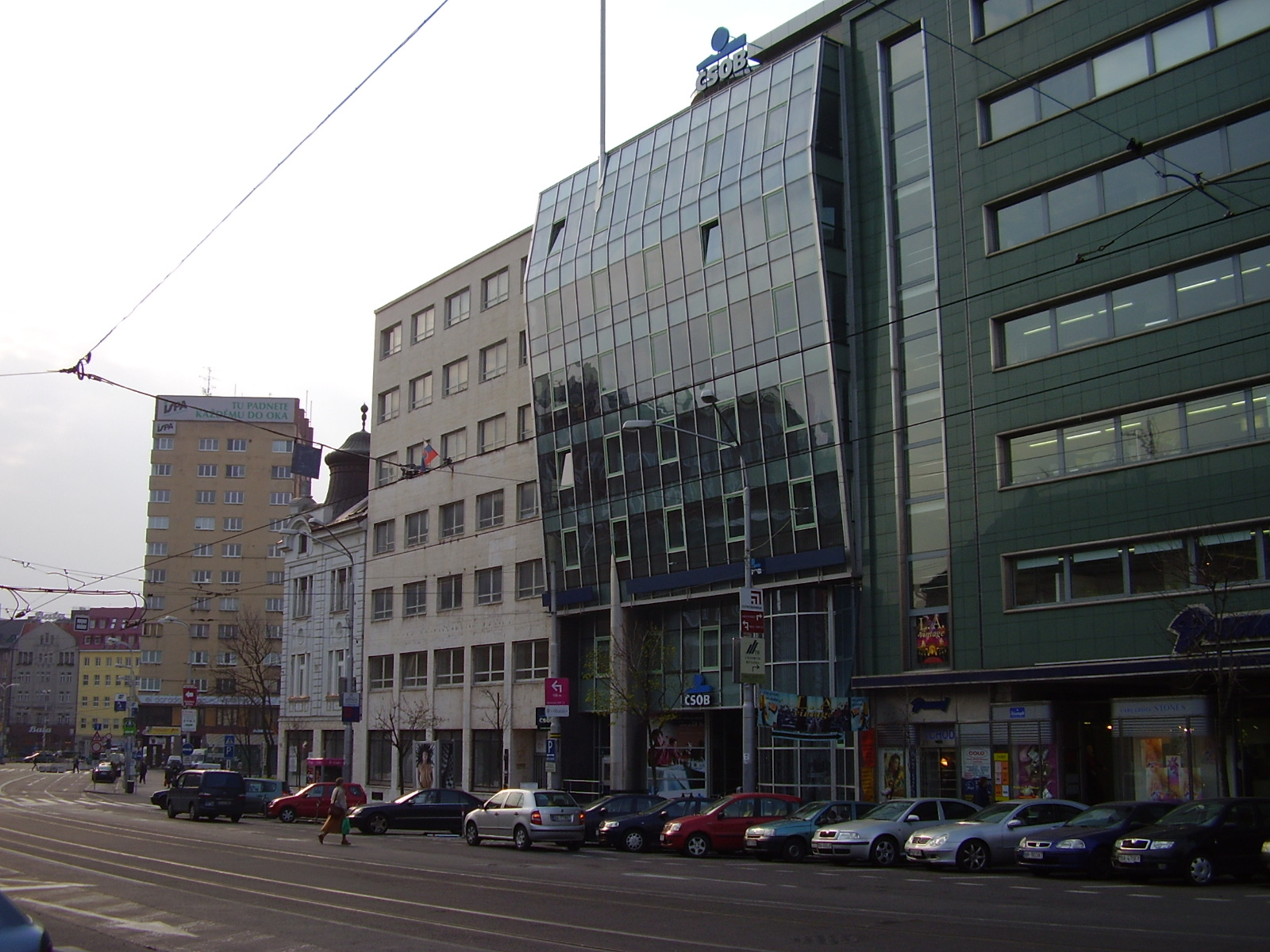
The SNP square street

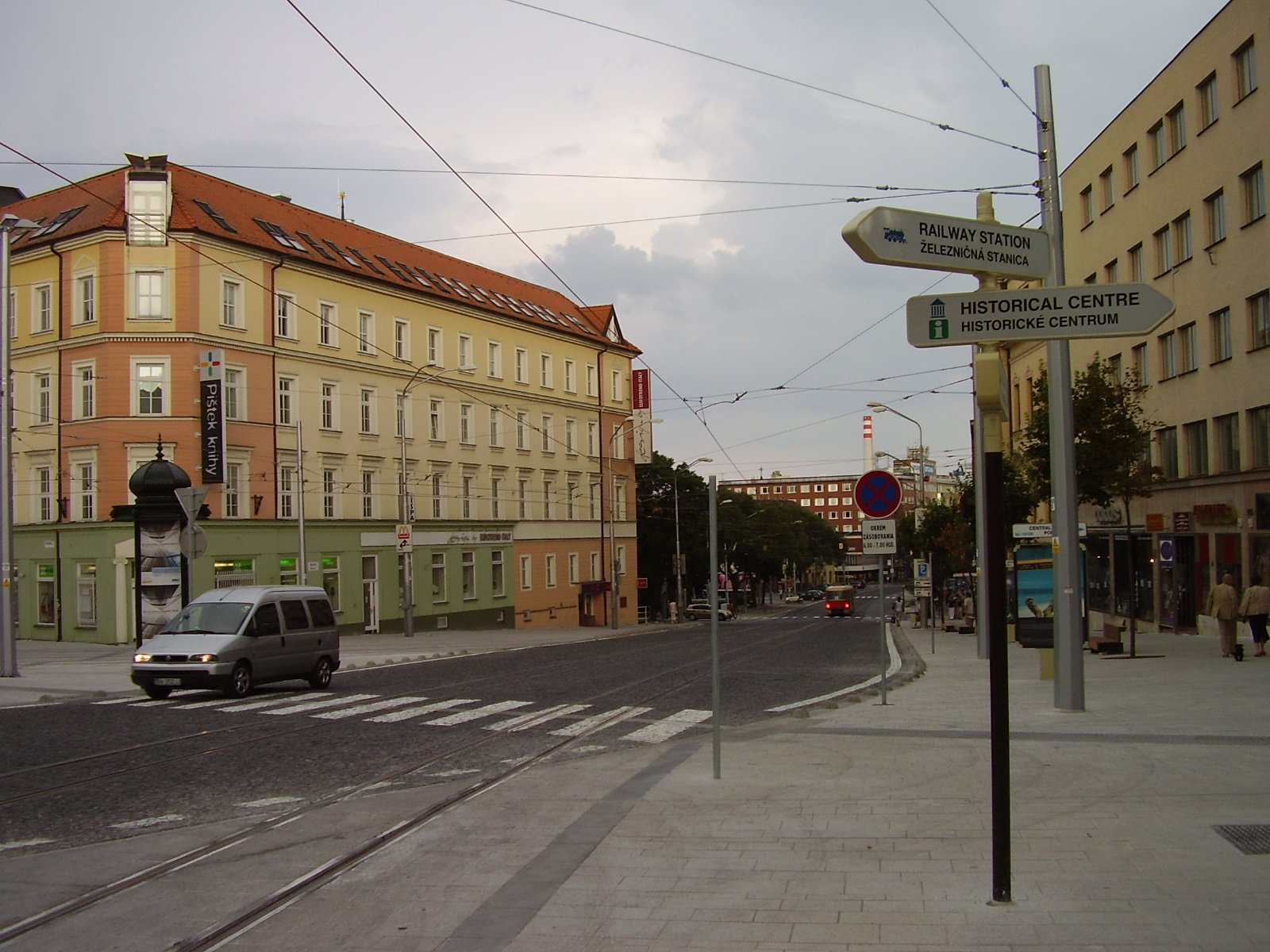
The SNP square junction
