= List of museums in Slovakia =

This is a list of museums in Slovakia.

- Andy Warhol Museum of Modern Art
- Bratislava City Gallery
- Bratislava City Museum
- Bratislava Transport Museum
- East Slovak Gallery
- East Slovak Museum
- House of the Good Shepherd
- Museum of Danube Komarno
- Museum of the Slovak Village
- Orthodox synagogue in Bratislava
- Slovak National Gallery
- Slovak National Museum
- Slovak National Museum in Martin
- Slovak Red Cross Museum
- Slovak Technical Museum
- Small Carpathian Museum
- St. Urban Tower
- Prešov Regional Museum
- Fiľakovo Castle Museum
- Tekov Museum
- Franz Schubert City Museum in Želiezovce
- West Slovak Museum in Trnava

== See also ==
- Open-air museums in Slovakia
- Museums and galleries of Bratislava
- List of museums
- Tourism in Slovakia
- Culture of Slovakia
- Museum of Vojvodina Slovaks
