= Open-air museums in Slovakia =

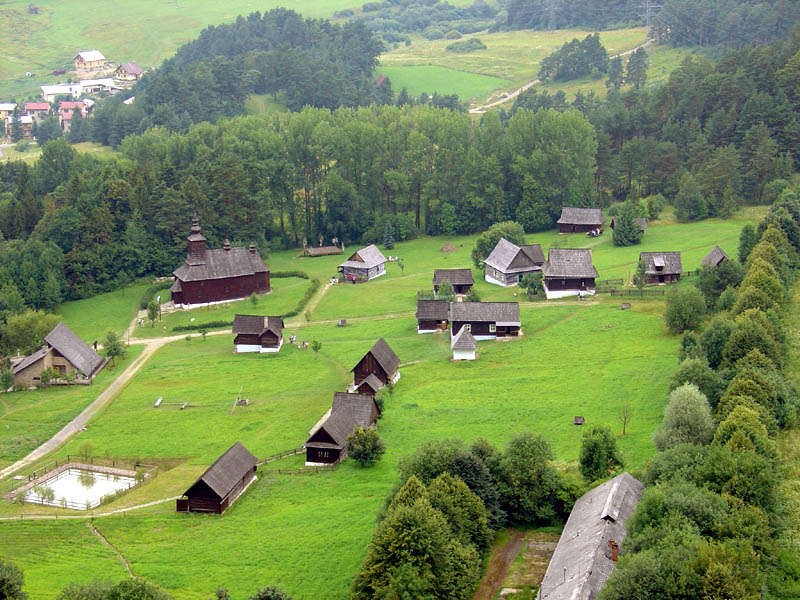
An aerial photograph of the open-air museum at Stará Ľubovňa, Slovakia

Slovakia has around 14 open-air museums, or skanzens, showcasing the country's folk traditions, architecture, and economic history. The museums include examples of traditional buildings and furnishings, and many offer demonstrations of traditional handicrafts. The largest open-air museum is the Slovak Village Open Air Museum in Martin.

== List of museums ==
- Archeoskanzen Havránok - Archaeological Park Havránok

A dedicated archaeological park beside the Liptovská Mara dam.

- Slovenské banské múzeum - Slovak Mining Museum, Open-Air Exhibition, Banská Štiavnica

Located in Banská Štiavnica, a designated UNESCO World Heritage Site in central Slovakia, it allows access in the old gold and silver mine.

- Čičmany Museum Village

Many of the village houses are built in the traditional style.

- Hornonitriansky banský skanzen – Baňa Cigeľ

Located in Sebedražie near Prievidza, it allows access in the brown coal mine.

- Expozícia ľudovej architektúry Rusínov - Ukrajincov - Exhibition of Folk Architecture of Ruthenians - Ukrainians, Svidník
- Ľubovnianske múzeum, národopisná expozícia v prírode (skanzen) - Ľubovňa Museum, Ethnographic Open-Air Collection, Stará Ľubovňa

Part of the Ľubovňa Castle complex in northern Slovakia.

- Múzeum ľudovej architektúry, Národopisná expozícia Bardejovské Kúpele - Museum of Folk Architecture, Ethnographic Open-Air Collection, Bardejov Spa

Part of the Bardejov Spa complex.

- Múzeum slovenskej dediny - Museum of the Slovak Village, Martin

Slovakia's largest open-air museum, located in Martin.

- Múzeum liptovskej dediny - Museum of the Liptov Village, Pribylina

Located in Pribylina, in the Liptov area.

- Vlkolínec Museum Village

Features many traditional buildings and is also a UNESCO World Heritage Site

- Múzeum kysuckej dediny - Museum of the Kysuce Village, Vychylovka

Located in Vychylovka, the site also features a restored forest logging railway.

- Múzeum oravskej dediny - Museum of the Orava Village, Zuberec – Brestová

Located in Zuberec, a 20-hectare site housing numerous traditional buildings relocated to the site for preservation from throughout the Orava region.

- Slovenské poľnohospodárske múzeum - Slovak Agricultural Museum, Nitra

Located in Nitra.

- Vihorlatské múzeum, expozícia ľudovej architektúry a bývania - Vihorlat Museum, Exhibition of the Folk Architecture and Dwelling

Located in Humenné, north-east Slovakia.

== Gallery ==
Open-air museums in Slovakia
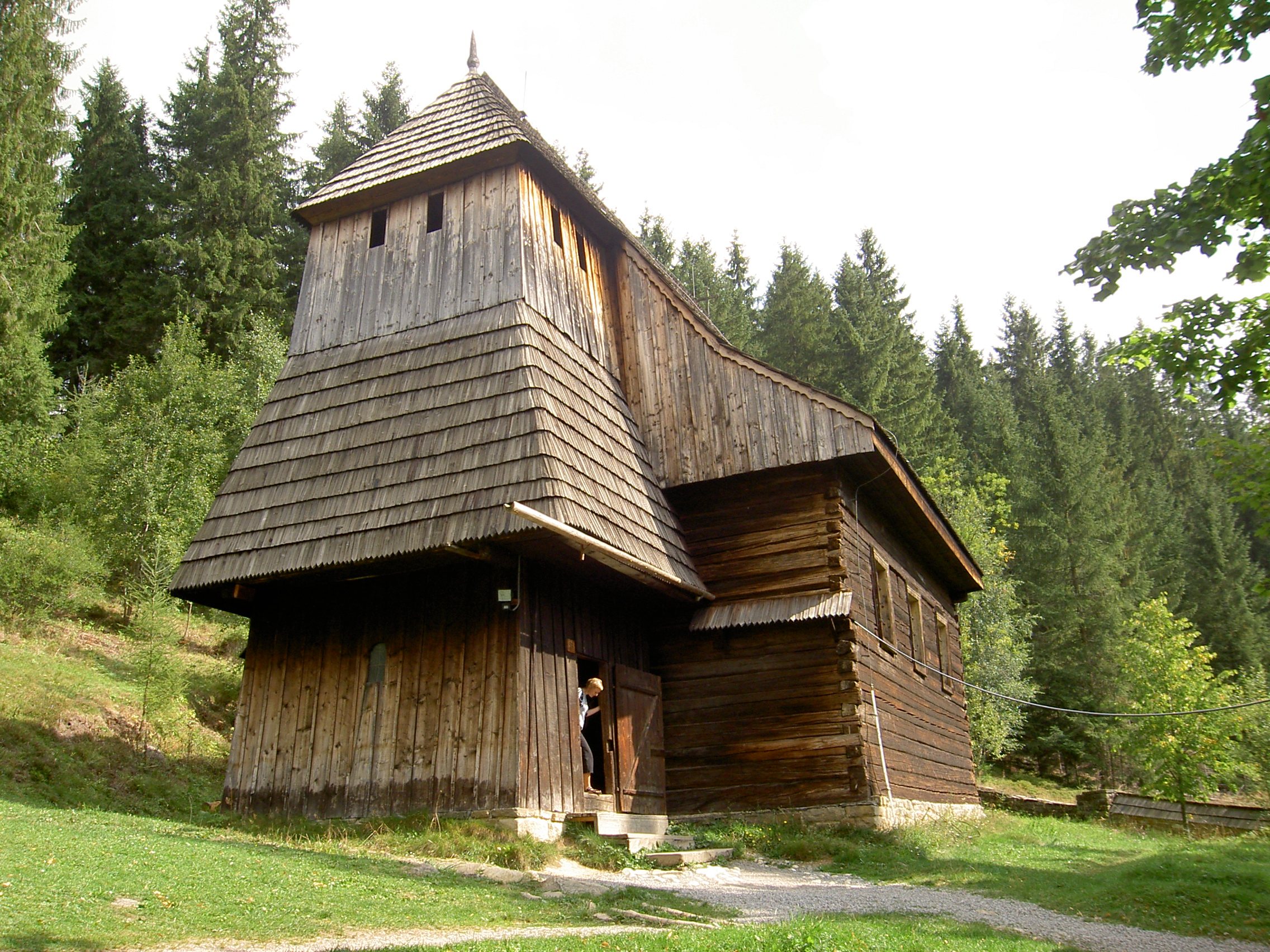
Wooden church at the Open Air Museum, Zuberec – Brestová

== See also ==
- List of museums in Slovakia
