= Matej Cifra =

Slovak YouTuber and TV presenter

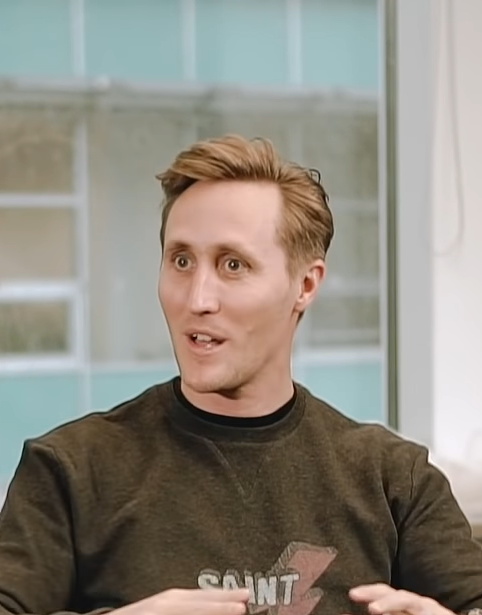
- Born: 10 July 1979 (age 45); Bratislava, Czechoslovakia
- Occupation(s): Presenter; YouTuber; Language teacher
- Spouse: Veronika Cifrová Ostrihoňová (m. 2016)
- Children: 2

Matej Cifra (born 10 July 1979), also known as Sajfa, is a Slovak YouTuber, presenter, and former language teacher.

In 2024, Cifra ranked eighth in Trend.sk list of the most expensive Slovak social media influencers with estimated price per one commercial post in the area of 2,608€ - 3,130€.

== Early life ==
Cifra was born on 10 July 1979 in Bratislava. He is the youngest of three brothers. Cifra graduated from the Faculty of Philosophy, Comenius University, teaching English and Slovak for five years.

== Career ==
Cifra became radio presenter appearing on Fun Rádio in 2002, hosting the programme's morning block alongside Adela Vinczeová. They wrote a book from behind the scenes of the radio titled Veci, o ktorých viete pomerne málo (lit. 'Things You Know Relatively Little About'). He debuted as a TV presenter with Didiana in Noci Vyvolených (lit. 'The Night of the Chosen') in 2005.

In 2015, Cifra started creating a talk show on YouTube called LevelLama (lvlLama), where he always invites a group of Slovak public figures to play video games with them.

== Personal life ==
Cifra got engaged to editor, presenter, model, and politician Veronika Cifrová Ostrihoňová in 2015, with whom he owns the Versaj Production company, whose sales reached almost 350,000 Euros in 2019. The couple got married in September 2016. In 2021, Cifra and Ostrihoňová filed a criminal complaint against journalist Martin Daňo, who was accused of tax fraud and was about to be in court.

Cifra supports the charity projects Úsmev as a gift or the Children's Hour project. He enjoys running in his free time, often participating in local marathon tournaments.

== Philanthropy ==
In 2009, Cifra participated at Tesco Run for Live charity event and donated some proceeds for cancer patients to the Cancer Research Foundation in Žilina. One year later, during the fourth edition of Rajecký half-marathon tournament hosted in the same city, he donated some proceeds for cancer patients to the children's department of the Faculty Polyclinic and Hospital.

Together with the other presenters of Fun Rádio in 2011, Cifra was going to participate in the 16th drop of blood campaign organised by the Slovak Red Cross Museum. However, after 450 ml of the rare fluid drained from his body, Sajfa's blood pressure dropped and he had to receive treatment.

== Bibliography ==
- Banášová, Adela; Cifra, Matej: Veci, o ktorých viete pomerne málo: (receptáriky). 1. vyd. Bratislava: Kelion, 2006. 125 s. ISBN 80-969573-4-1.
