= West Slovak Museum in Trnava =

Museum located in Slovakia

- Západoslovenské múzeum v Trnave
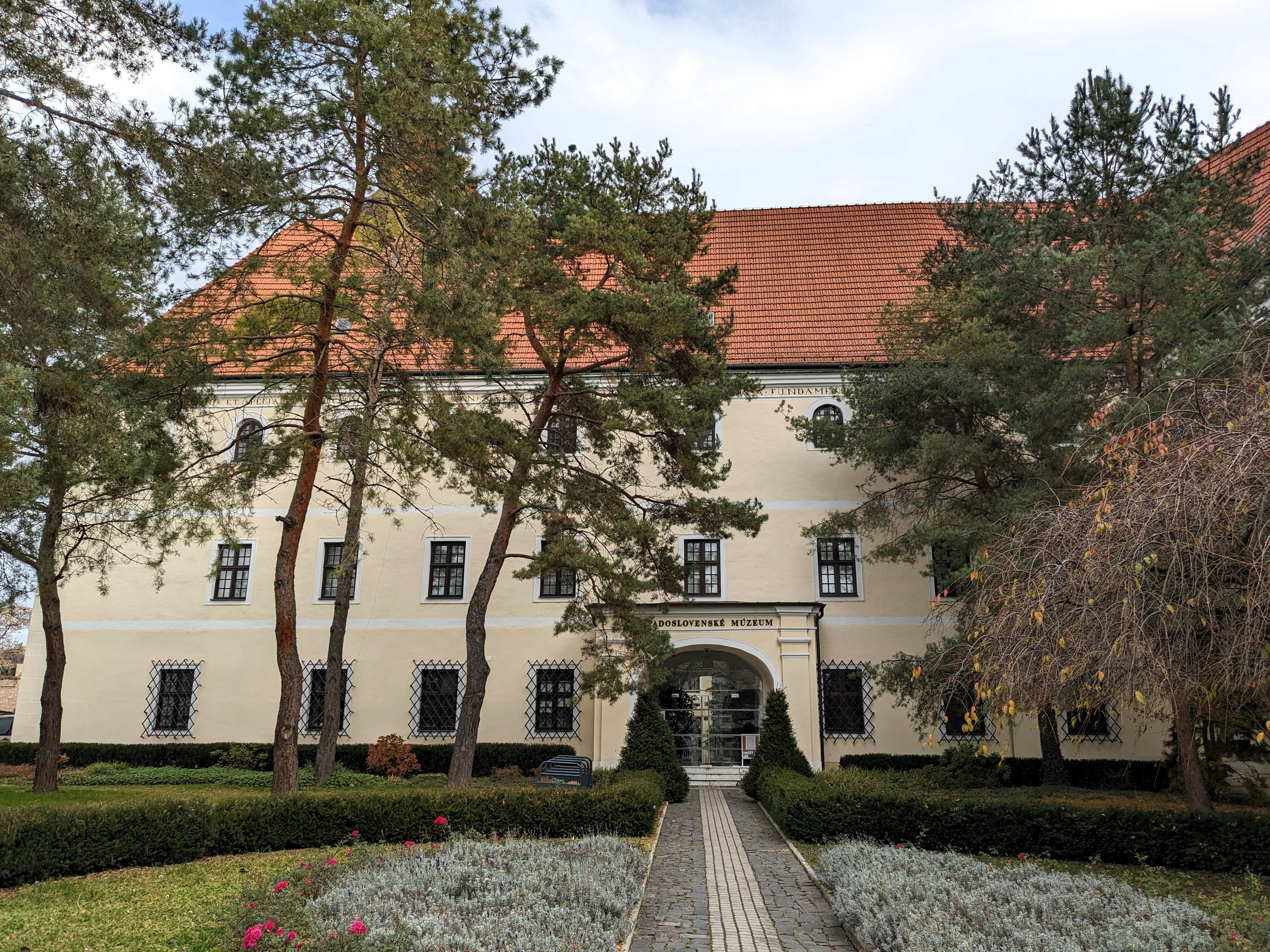
- View from the entrance of the museum
- Location: Trnava, Slovakia
- Coordinates: 22.52980°N 35.6041°E
- Type: Regional local history museum

The West Slovak Museum in Trnava (Slovak: Západoslovenské múzeum v Trnave) is a regional museum of local history with social and natural history expositions and exhibitions. It is one of the largest museums in Slovakia. It was established in 1954 as the Regional Museum in Trnava. The museum is located in Trnava, in the building of the former Poor Clare monastery from the 13th century.

== Exhibitions ==
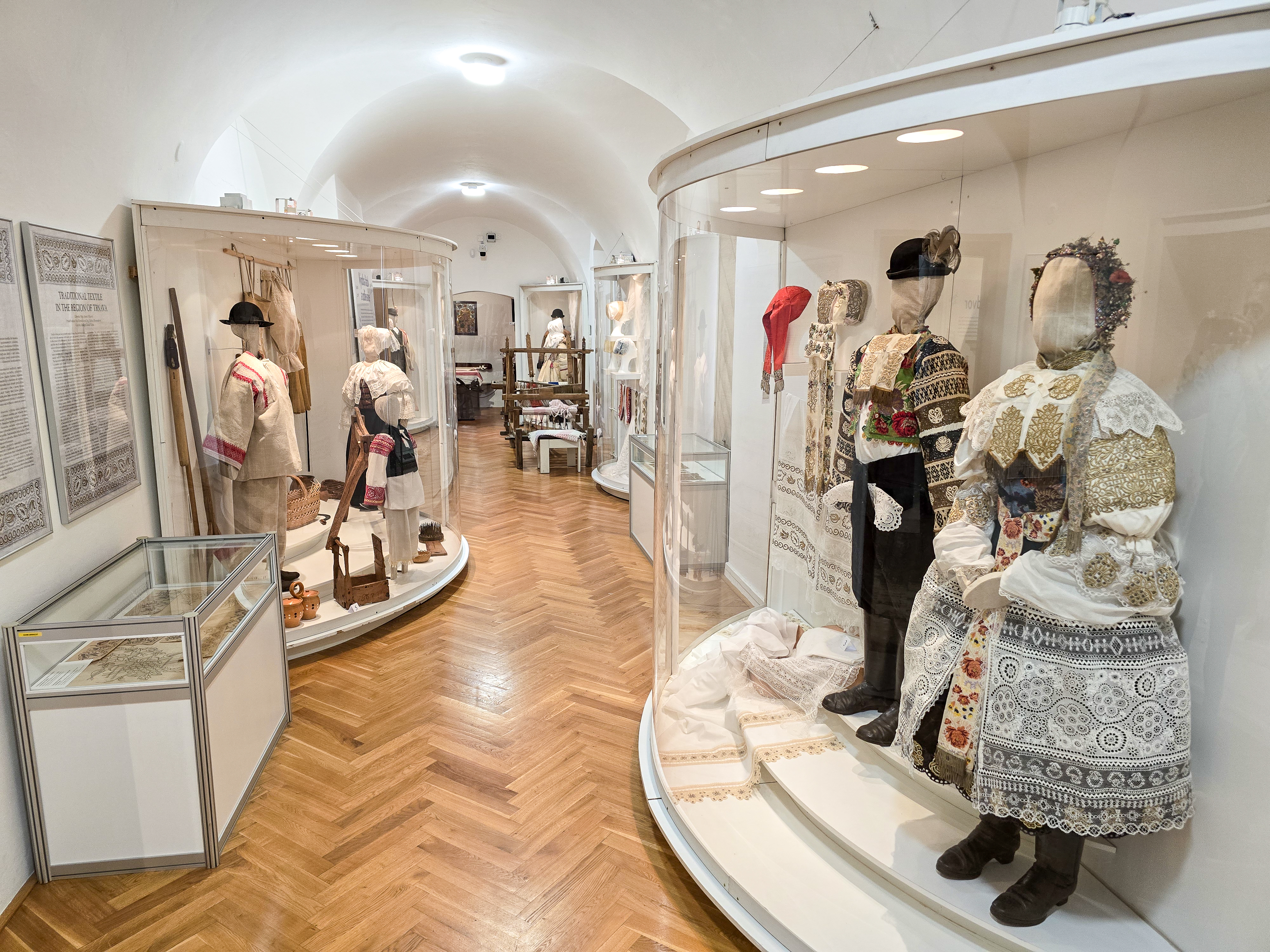
One of the exhibitions

It manages 149,643 collection items in its collections, of which 65,970 relate to natural sciences, 49,376 to history and 34,297 to ethnology. It keeps 50,039 book units in the historical library. The West Slovak Museum also includes the Museum of Book Culture located in the Olláh Seminary and the Mikuláš Schneidr Trnavský House of Music. Around 40,000 visitors visit the museum's exhibitions, expositions and events annually. In addition to topics related to the region of Western Slovakia, the museum specializes in the history of book culture, the history of campanology, the history of brickmaking, the personality of Mikuláš Schneidr Trnavský and his works, invertebrates in the field of paleontology, the history of the Slovak learned fellowship, the personality of Anton Bernolák and the origin and history of the Dobrofest festival.

== See also ==
- List of museums in Slovakia
