= Zora Mintalová-Zubercová =

Slovak historian

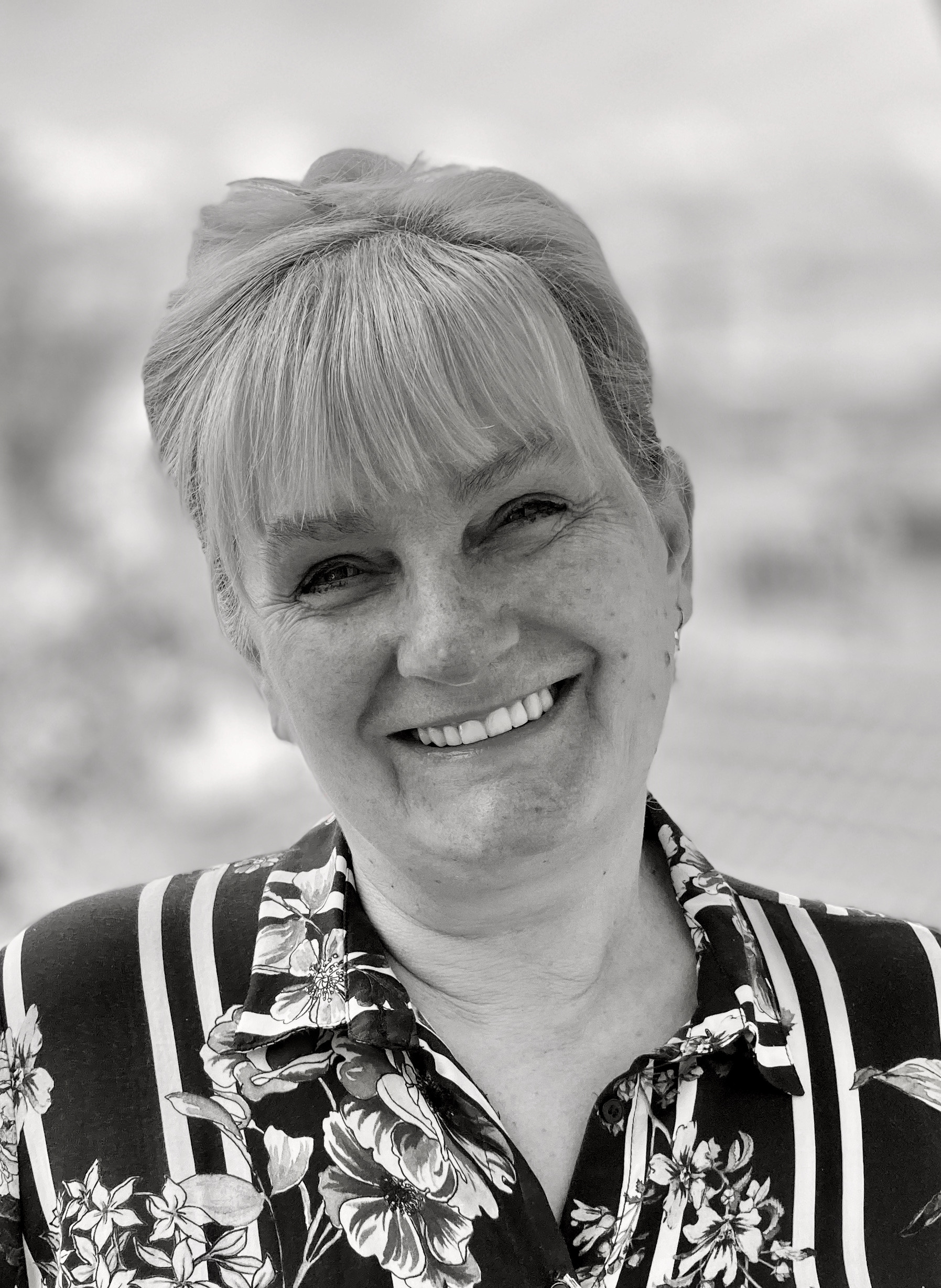
- Zubercova in 2020
- Born: Zora Zubercová; 7 June 1950 (age 76); Martin, Czechoslovakia (modern-day Slovakia)
- Education: Comenius University in Bratislava (PhDr., 1980)
- Scientific career
- Fields: Food history, culinary history, material culture, history of the Red Cross movement
- Workplaces: Slovak National Museum; Slovak Red Cross Museum

Zora Mintalová-Zubercová (née Zubercová; born 7 June 1950) is a Slovak ethnographer, historian, museologist and popular science author, best known for her study of food history and material culture of Slovakia and the history of the Slovak Red Cross. Her work has, among others, earned her the Pitrè Prize as well as the National Medal of Science of the Slovak Republic.

Mintalova-Zubercová spent more than thirty years as a researcher and later senior researcher and head of the Scientific-Research Department of the Slovak National Museum in Martin, subsequently also serving as the museum's deputy director. She was instrumental in founding the Slovak Red Cross Museum and later served as its inaugural director until her retirement in 2009.

== Early life and education ==
Mintalová Zubercová was born in Martin, the elder daughter of Slovak publishing editor and playwright Ján Zuberec, and Darina Zubercová (née Pobudová). Both her parents had a gentry background and belonged to the Slovak intellectual circles, which attracted negative attention by the then rising Communist Party of Czechoslovakia. After the country fell under the Communist rule the family fortune of her parents was nationalised, and her father was assigned as a worker to a brick factory. Growing up in Martin, Mintalová-Zubercová attended the local grammar school, and later thanks to a family friend was despite her personnel files held by the Communist party able to apply for university. She went on to study ethnography and history at the Faculty of Arts at Comenius University in Bratislava, graduating in 1974 with a Prom. Etnograf degree. She then started working the same year as a research assistant at the Ethnographic Institute of the Slovak National Museum. After earning her PhDr. in ethnography and history in 1980 from the Comenius University in Bratislava, she was promoted to a Researcher.

== Career ==
Because of her gentry background, Mintalová-Zubercová was not allowed to hold any senior scientific positions during the socialist era in Czechoslovakia. This changed only after the Velvet revolution of 1989, and the fall of the Communist party. She became a Senior Researcher and in 1990 the Head of the Scientific-Research department of the Slovak National Museum. This led to her scientific co-operation with many regional, national and international scientific organizations as the Musée national des Arts et Traditions Populaires Paris – department of Muséum national d'Histoire naturelle; Slovak Academy of Sciences; Museo Nazionale delle Arti e Tradizioni Popolari in Rome – Italy etc; State Russian Museum in St. Petersburg; etc. During her career at the Slovak National Museum she participated in more than 29 international and national Scientific-research tasks as a Principal Investigator an Co-Investigator, and curatored and co-authored more than 50 museum exhibitions in Slovakia and abroad including Cuba, Netherlands, Germany, Italy etc.

From 1996 to 2000, she also served as the Vice director of the Slovak National Museum in Martin. In the year 2000, she was entrusted by the Supreme Body of the Slovak Red Cross to found the Slovak Red Cross Museum. Two years later she was appointed to serve as the first director of the newly established museum.

Mintalová-Zubercová retired from her active scientific career in 2009, but still continues to work in the field of food history research, publishing books and articles. Currently, she serves on the board of National Culture of the Slovak Republic.

== Honors and awards ==
- Award of the Slovak ethnographic society at the Slovak Academy of Sciences in the category exhibitions for „Z kuchyne starých matiek", 1987
- Ciechanów Voivodeship Medal of Merit, Ciechanów – Poland, 1987
- National Medal of Science of the Slovak Republic, 1991,(member of the scientific team);
- Slovak Academy of Sciences award for scientific-research, 1995, (member of the scientific team);
- Giuseppe Pitrè-Salvatore Salomone Marino International award for ethnological and anthropological studies, Palermo-Italy, 1995, for „Encyklopédia ľudovej kultúry Slovenska (member of the group of authors)
- Award of the Slovak Museum Association for the development of Slovak museology, 1981 and 2000
- Slovak National Museum medal for the development of museology, 2000
- Commemorative medal of the Slovak Red Cross, 2009
- Best Culinary History Book in Slovakia (Gourmand World Cookbook Award), 2012
- Award of the Žilina Self Governing Region
- Honorary Citizenship of Vrútky

== Bibliography ==
During her career Mintalová-Zubecová authored and co-authored more than 14 monographs, and published more than 250 scientific papers in the fields of history and ethnology.

=== Books ===
- Z ľudovej kultúry Turca, ISBN 80-7090-760-6 (co-author, editor)
- Red Cross in Slovakia in the years 1919–1938, ISBN 80-969221-9-X.
- Red Cross in Slovakia in the years 1939–1947, ISBN 80-89208-03-7.
- Z turčianskej kuchyne, ISBN 978-80-89208-64-7
- Veľká kniha slovenských Vianoc, ISBN 978-80-89208-92-0
- Všetko okolo stola I., ISBN 978-80-89208-94-4
- Všetko okolo stola II., ISBN 978-80-81150-13-5
- Vianoce na Slovensku, ISBN 978-80-556-0444-2
- Tradície na Slovensku ISBN 978-80-556-1482-3
- Príbeh vlákna ISBN 978-80-556-2365-8
- Ako sme kedysi žili ISBN 978-80-556-2795-3
