= Veronika Cifrová Ostrihoňová =

Slovak politician

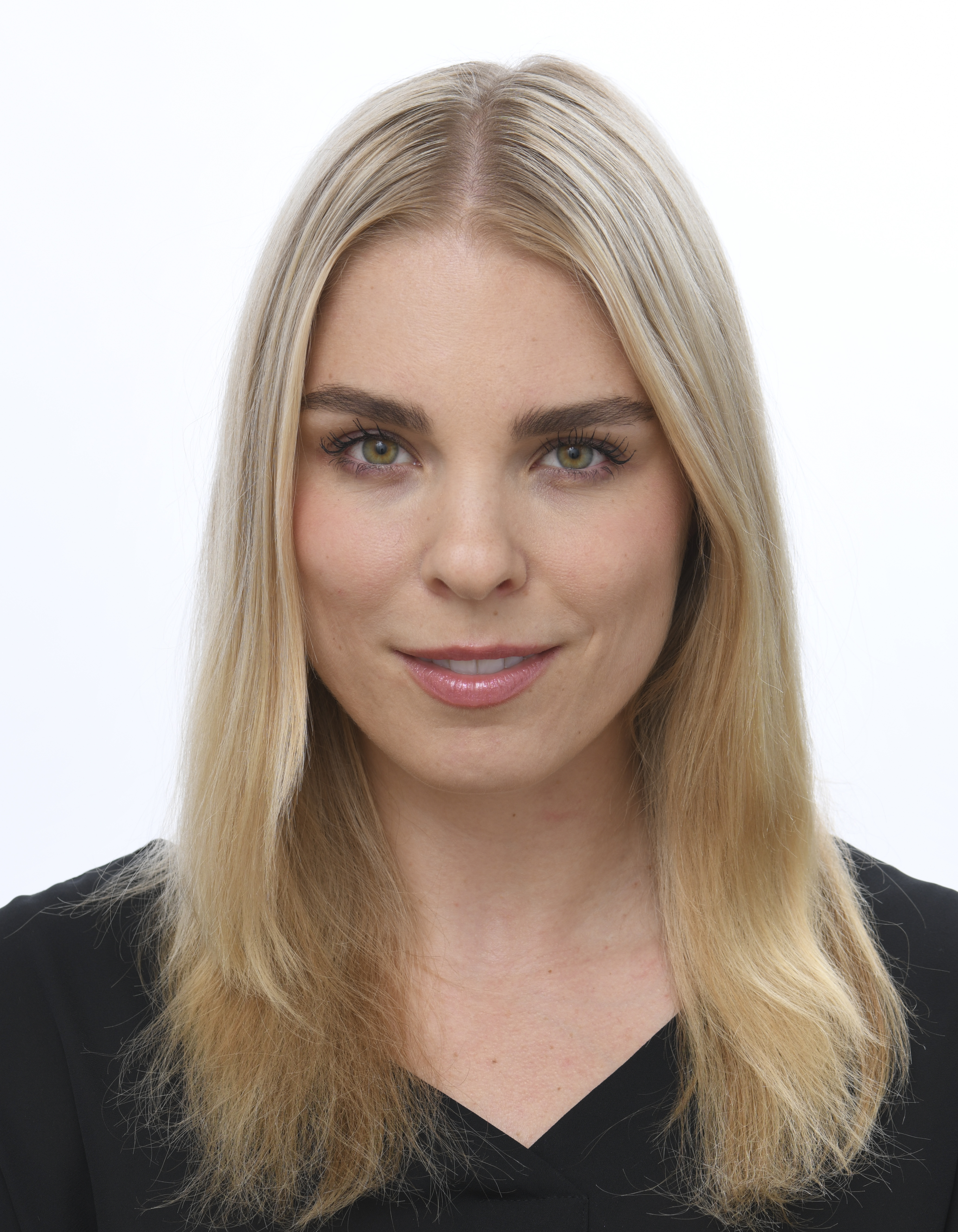

Member of the European Parliament for Slovakia
- Incumbent
- Assumed office 16 July 2024

Personal details
- Born: 3 February 1989 (age 37) Bratislava, Czechoslovakia (now Slovakia)
- Party: Progressive Slovakia
- Other political affiliations: Renew Europe; Alliance of Liberals and Democrats for Europe Party
- Education: New York University

Veronika Cifrová Ostrihoňová (born 1989) is a former Slovak television editor, reporter, and presenter. She became a member of the European Parliament for the social-liberal Progressive Slovakia party in the June 2024 election.

== Early life and education ==
Ostrihoňová was born on 3 February 1989 in Bratislava in what was at the time Czechoslovakia but is now the capital of Slovakia. She graduated from the International Baccalaureate Diploma programme at the Gymnasium Jur Hronec, a bilingual English-Slovak school. Ostrihoňová studied political science and history at New York University (NYU). She graduated "summa cum laude" in 2012 and was a member of the Phi Beta Kappa academic society.

== Career ==
=== Television ===
Ostrihoňová started to work on television in 2013 on the Markíza TV station, where she was an editor in the news programme Televízne noviny, focusing on health topics. In 2015, Ostrihoňová presented Showbiz noviny. She hosted the talk show Sit down with Veronika in 2017, travelling throughout Slovakia to interview inspiring celebrities. Among the programme's guests were journalist Monika Tódová, president of Slovakia, Zuzana Čaputová, Slovak ice hockey player Richard Lintner, and actor Ján Koleník. In 2019, Ostrihoňová created a YouTube channel titled Very Veri. In 2019, she won the Slovak TV Screen Personality award in the News Editor category.

Ostrihoňová founded the ŽEMY podcast in 2020, explaining the role of women in decision-making. From 2021 to 2024, she co-created and moderated the discussion show for women titled Silná zostva on Radio and Television of Slovakia.

In 2023, the Slovak edition of Forbes magazine listed her in seventh place in the ranking of Slovak "influencers". She also was the editor-in-chief of the first ever issue of ForbesWomen in Slovakia.

In 2025 Ostrihoňová was a winner at the MEP Awards for Best Use of Social Media.

=== Politics ===
In presenting programmes, her interests were related to gender and other inequalities, current affairs, history, culture, and politics. She led 2024 European Parliament election as a Progressive Slovakia candidate, becoming a member of the Renew Europe grouping within the European Parliament. Ostrihoňová was elected together with five other candidates from the Progressive Slovakia list, the party's biggest-ever delegation in Brussels. As a result of her political activities, RTVS terminated her role in Silná zostava.

At the European Parliament, Ostrihoňová is a full member of the Committee on Civil Liberties, Justice and Home Affairs (LIBE) and the Committee on Public Health (SANT). She is a substitute member of the Committee on Internal Market and Consumer Protection (IMCO) as well as the Committee on Women’s Rights and Gender Equality (FEMM). Ostrihoňová is also a member of the EU–UK Parliamentary Partnership Assembly and a substitute at the Delegation of the European Parliament for relations with Canada. She is also a Vice-Chair of the EP’s Intergroup on Children’s rights.

== Personal life ==
On 10 September 2016, Ostrihoňová married radio and television presenter and YouTuber Matej Cifra. They had a daughter and son, born in 2019 and 2022 respectively.
