= Franz Schubert City Museum in Želiezovce =

Museum in Nitra Region, Slovakia

City Museum
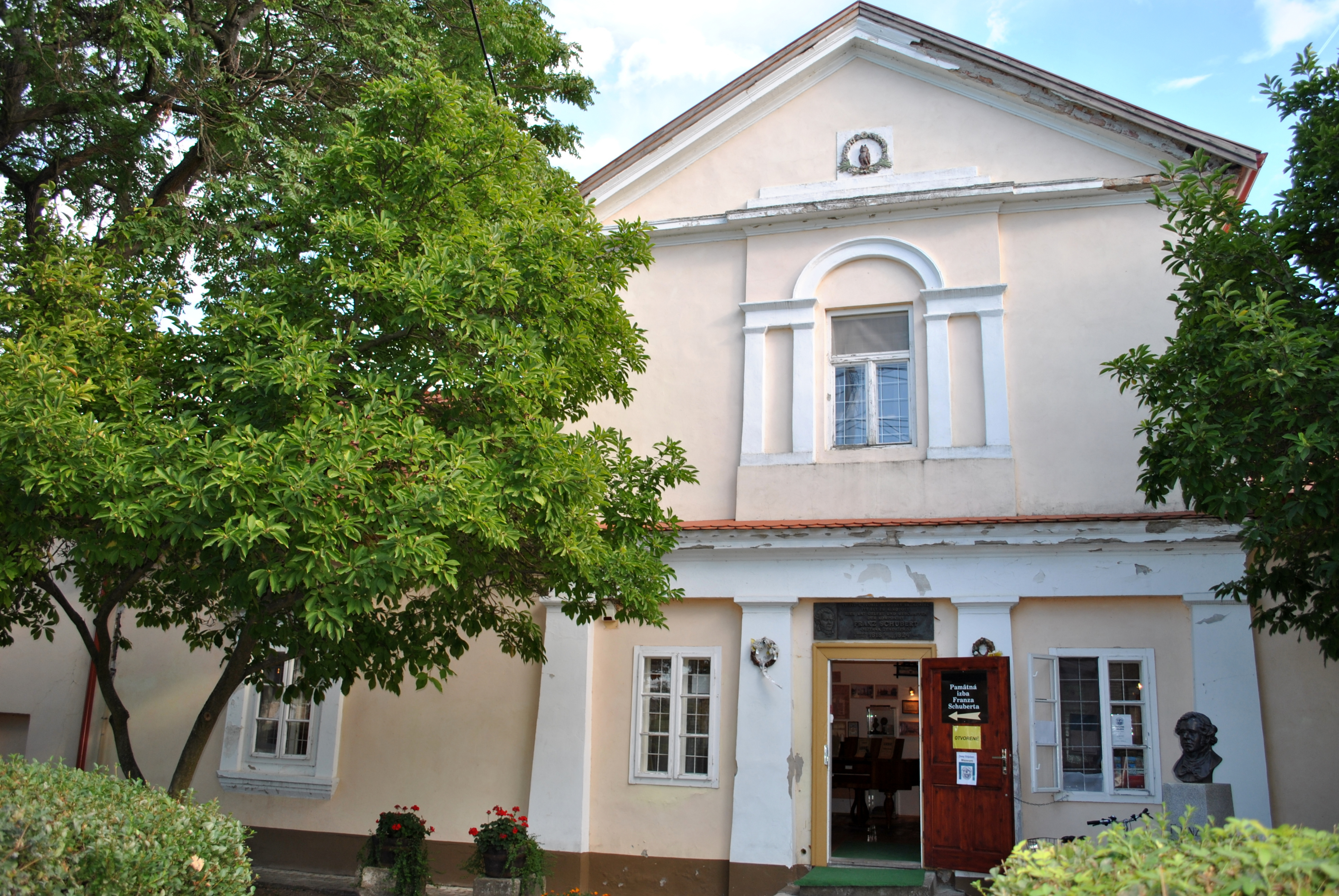
- The museum in 2016
- Coordinates: 48.04657°N 18.660101°E

The Franz Schubert City Museum and Memorial Room in Želiezovce (Slovak: Mestské múzeum a pamätná izba Franza Schuberta; also referred to as the Memorial room of Franz Schubert or the Želiezovce Museum) is a museum located in Želiezovce. It was part of the Tekov Museum in Levice, but was later moved to a part of the city museum in the Slovak town of Želiezovce.

The museum was originally built in 1824 to house Austrian composer Franz Schubert. It contains exhibitions of the history of the town, archaeological findings, and of Schubert.

== History ==
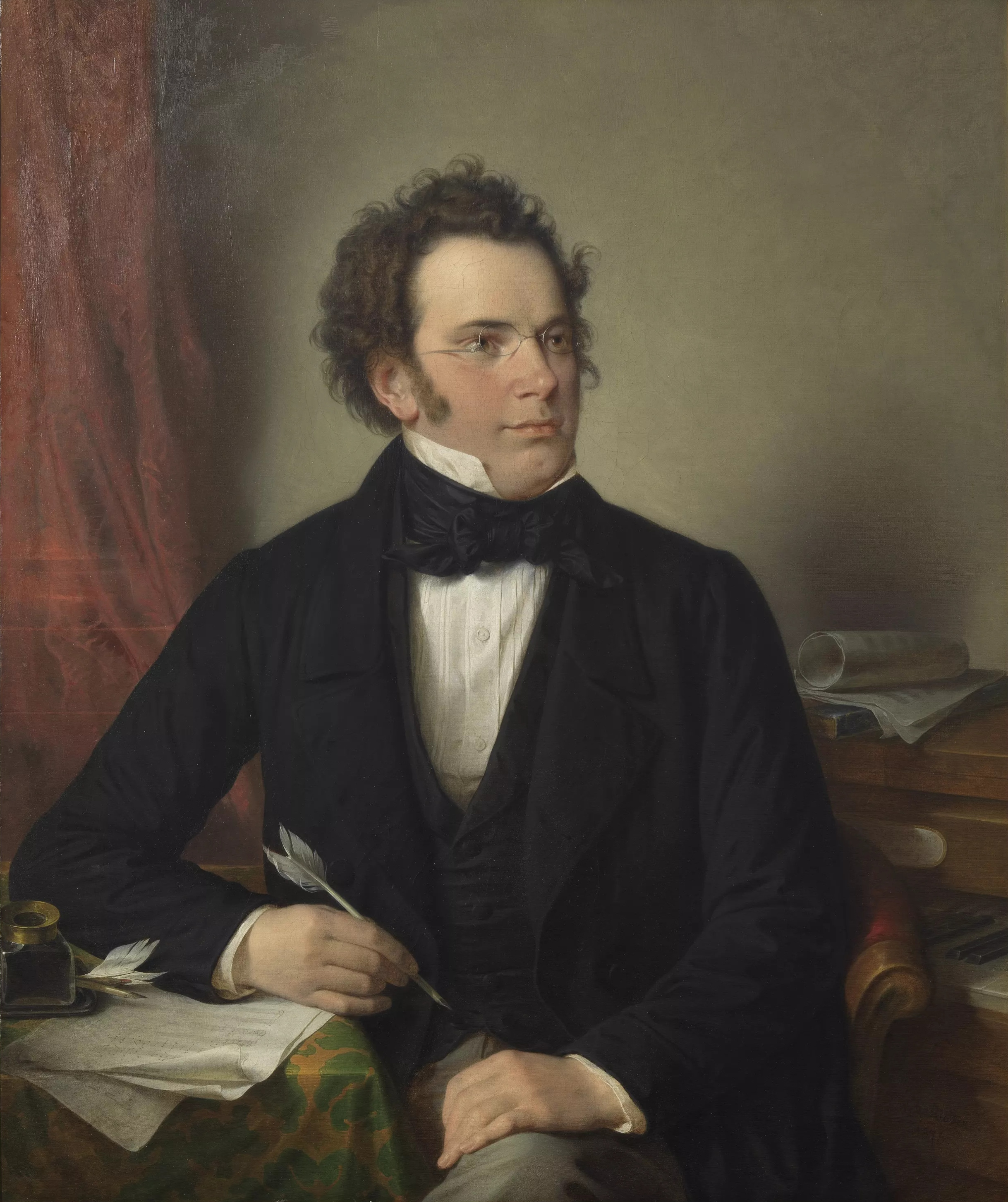
1875 portrait of Schubert

In the summers of 1818 and 1824, Franz Schubert traveled to Želiezovce, where he worked as a music teacher in the family of Count Johann Esterházy. He was accommodated in the Owl Castle, where the museum is now located. The building originally was built so that Schubert could stay there during his second visit. Until October 2009, it was an exhibition of the Tekovský Museum in Levice, after which it was inaccessible to the public due to the reconstruction of the building. During the repairs, the exposition was expanded to two more rooms, and on May 15, 2010, it was officially called the Franz Schubert City Museum and Memorial Room.

== Exhibitions ==
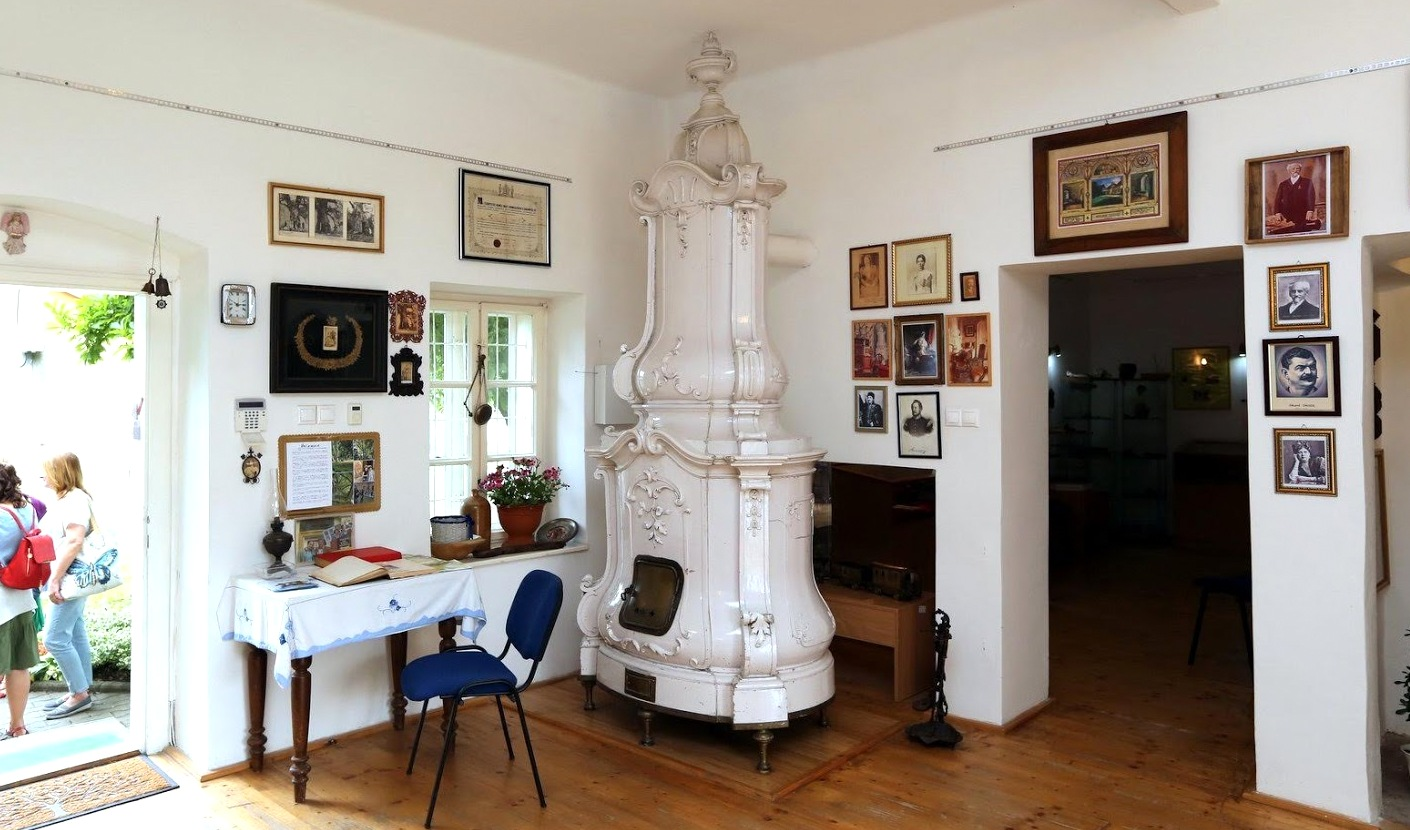
Exhibition of the Owl House

The original exposition documented the life and work of Franz Schubert. After the reconstruction in 2009–2010, expositions mapping the history of the town of Želiezovce were added. Most of the objects come from the collections of the Slovak National Museum - the Archaeological Museum, the Music Museum, the Tekovský Museum in Levice, but also from private collectors, mainly from the local historian Pavel Polka.

In the first room, there are objects and archaeological finds from the period of the Iron Age culture, the Stone Age, Bronze Age, Iron Age, Roman Age and the migration of peoples. The second room focuses on the Esterházy family, whose summer residence was located in a nearby mansion. It also contains documents about the town native bishop Augustín Fischer-Colbriem, who ordained later president of Slovakia Jozef Tiso as a priest. The third room shows the period of the First and Second World Wars, the deportation of Jews in the area and the local folk culture. The fourth room is located on the first floor of the building and is dedicated to the life and work of Schubert.

== See also ==
- List of museums in Slovakia
