= Tekov Museum =

Museum in Slovakia

- Tekovské múzeum
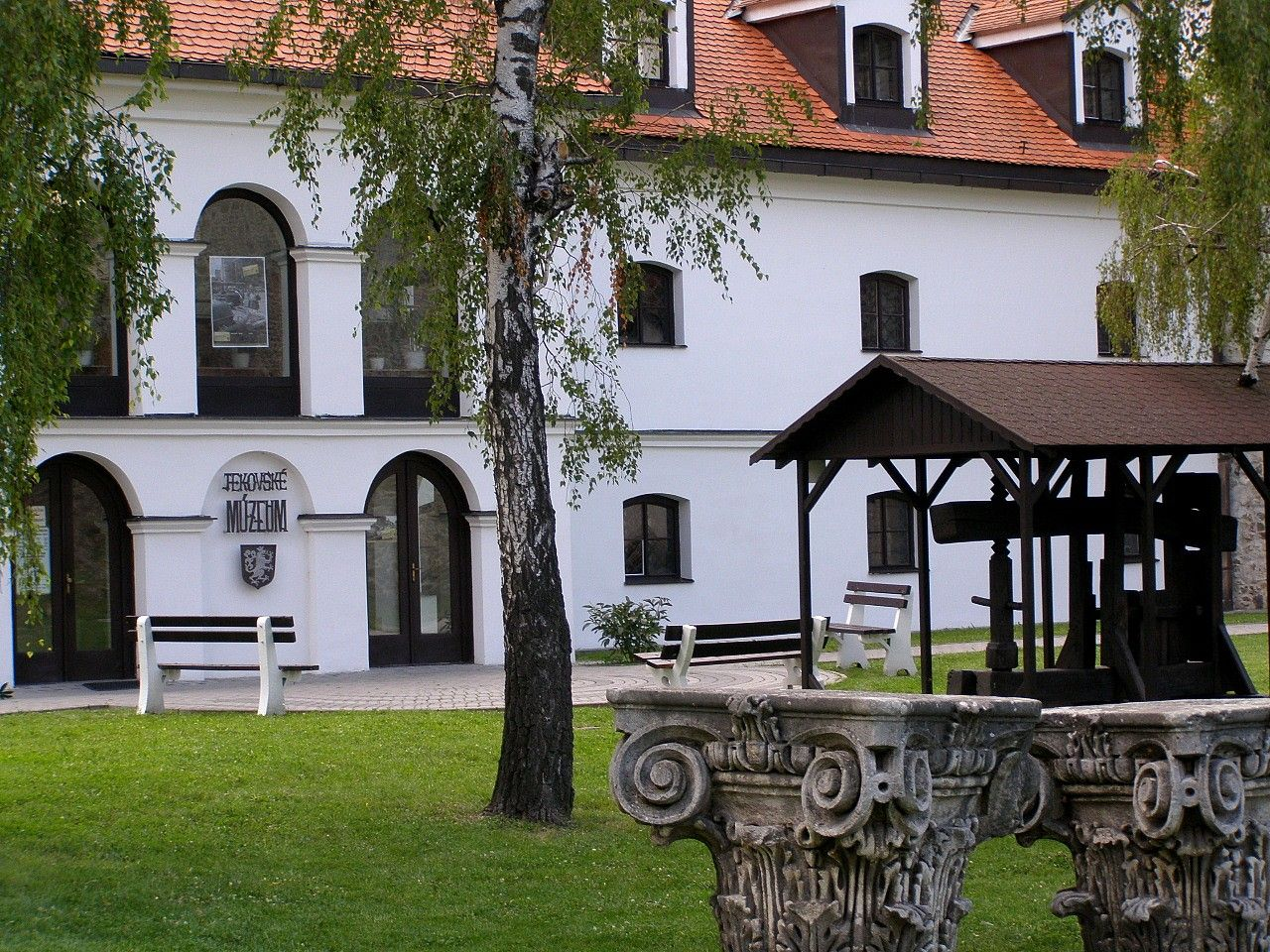
- Established: 1927; 99 years ago
- Coordinates: 48.221216°N 18.60128°E
- Website: muzeumlevice.sk

The Tekov Museum (Slovak: Tekovské múzeum; also referred to as Levice Museum) is a regional local history museum located in the town of Levice which documents the history, natural sciences, and folk culture of the region. It owns over 110,000 collection items from the fields of living and non-living nature, history, archaeology, and folk culture. It is a part of the Levice Castle.

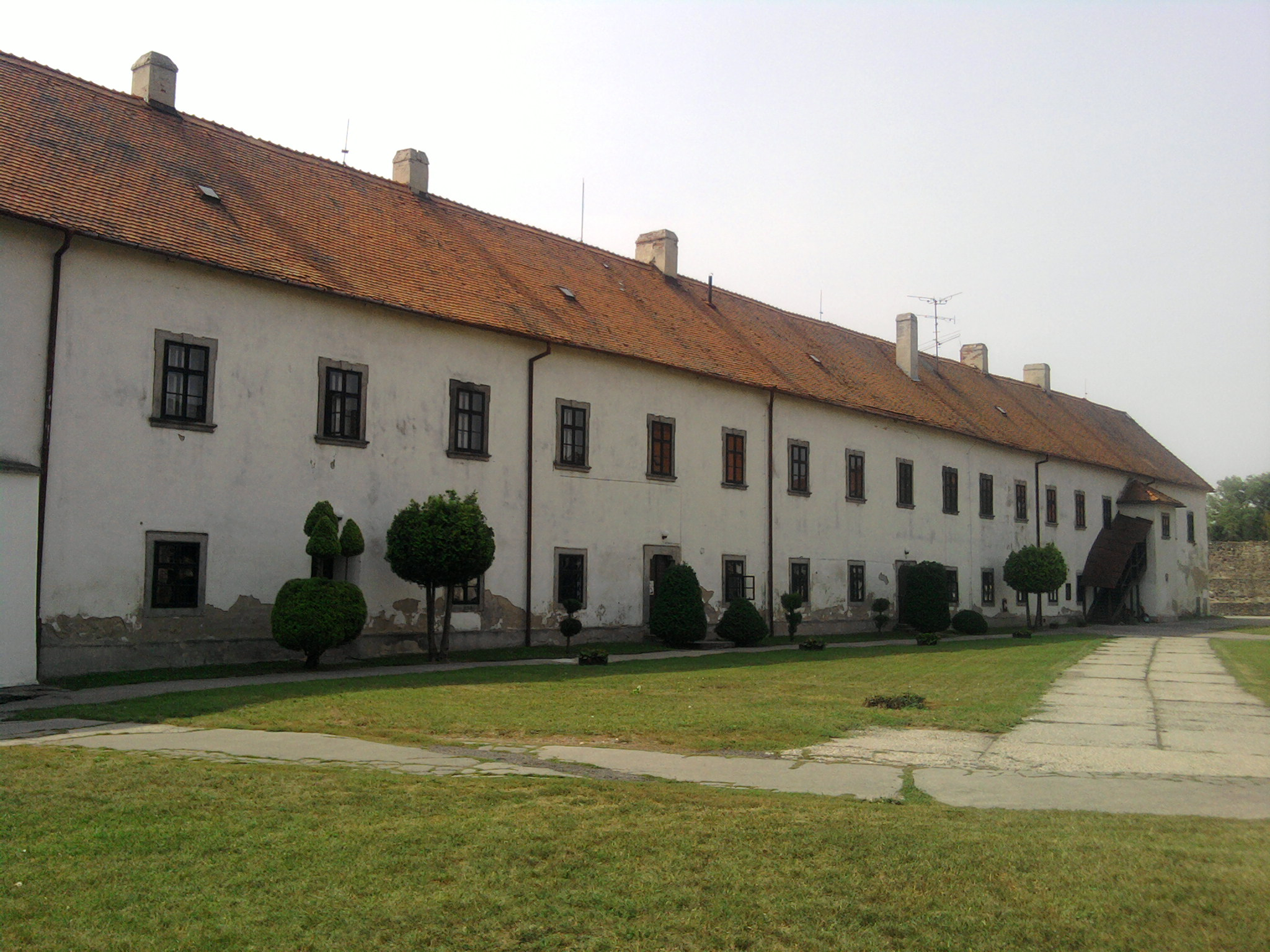
The Palace of Dobó

== History ==
The Tekov Museum was established in 1927 after a donation of a large collection by Jozef Nécsey. Over the years, the museum expanded its collection to include archaeological and ethnographic items, paintings, family archives, and books. Its first location was on the second floor of a town house, with an exhibition called Nécsey's Room. Later, the museum received donations from local residents, schools, and institutions, including artifacts from the former Piarist Gymnasium and collections from Austro-Hungarian traveler Kálmán Kittenberger. Since 1958, the museum has been housed in the Captain's Building, which underwent extensive reconstruction from 1982 to 1998. In 2001, a permanent exhibition dedicated to the history of pharmacy and the castle was opened, along with the Jozef Nécsey Gallery, which serves as the entrance to the permanent exhibits. The museum also uses the Palace of Dobó for exhibitions. It focuses on ethnographic and natural science research, collecting items from regions such as the eastern part of the Danube Upland, Štiavnické Hills, Pohronský Inovec, and the Krupina Plain.

== See also ==
- List of museums in Slovakia
- Franz Schubert City Museum in Želiezovce
