= Museum of Danube Komarno =

Cultural and natural history museum in Komárno, Slovakia

Coordinates: 47°45′27″N 18°07′37″E

The Museum of Danube in Komárno is a cultural and natural history museum in Komárno, Slovakia. The museum processes and makes accessible documents on the development of nature and society of the southern part of the Danube lowland and of Hungarian nationality culture in the Slovak Republic.

== History ==
The Historical and Archaeological Society in Komárňa County was founded in 1886, corresponding with the development of the city of Komarna. The collection this society had formed the foundational collection of the museum. In 1900, the association was renamed the Museum Association of the Komárňa County and City of Komárna and was divided into four departments; historical, archaeological, natural history, and ethnography.

In 1911, The Jókai Educational and Museum Association was created by merging the Museum Association with the Education Association and the county library. In 1913, Budapest University professor Dezső Hültla had built the Cultural Palace, which is today the museum headquarters.

In 1948, the District Museum was founded, and was renamed the Danube Museum in 1949. Due to lack of staff and space to grow, the museum did not undergo a lot of development until the 1970s. In 1970, permanent exhibits were opened, and the building was repaired. Through the decade, more workers were hired, and more research was undertaken.

Beginning in 1975, the museum began renting more space to show temporary exhibitions, and has continued this practice. In 1979, the museum began publishing research in a newsletter, containing research by staff and events at the museum.

In 1991, the collections of the museum were expanded to include more artifacts from all of Slovakia; this also included Hungarian artifacts. A Hungarian department was established in the museum to coordinate display and use of the Hungarian artifacts.

== Current Affairs ==
=== Mission and Purpose ===
The museum focuses on collecting and preserving the history and development of the Komárno region, as well as the area surrounding it. It also researches the history and culture of the Hungarian minority in the region, and it specializes in researching Roman monuments in the area.

The museum also documents the present culture of the region. It also works to document and preserve wildlife and natural habitats in the region.

=== Permanent exhibitions ===
The historical development of the Komárno region from pre-history to the mid-1800s. Artifacts seen in this exhibition are of Roman, Celtic, late Avar, and Turkish origin.

An exhibition of the works of Károly Harmos, a painter who lived and worked in the area between the two World Wars. Harmos also worked as a drawing teacher and he worked to organize and develop the region's cultural and artistic life.

== Photographs ==
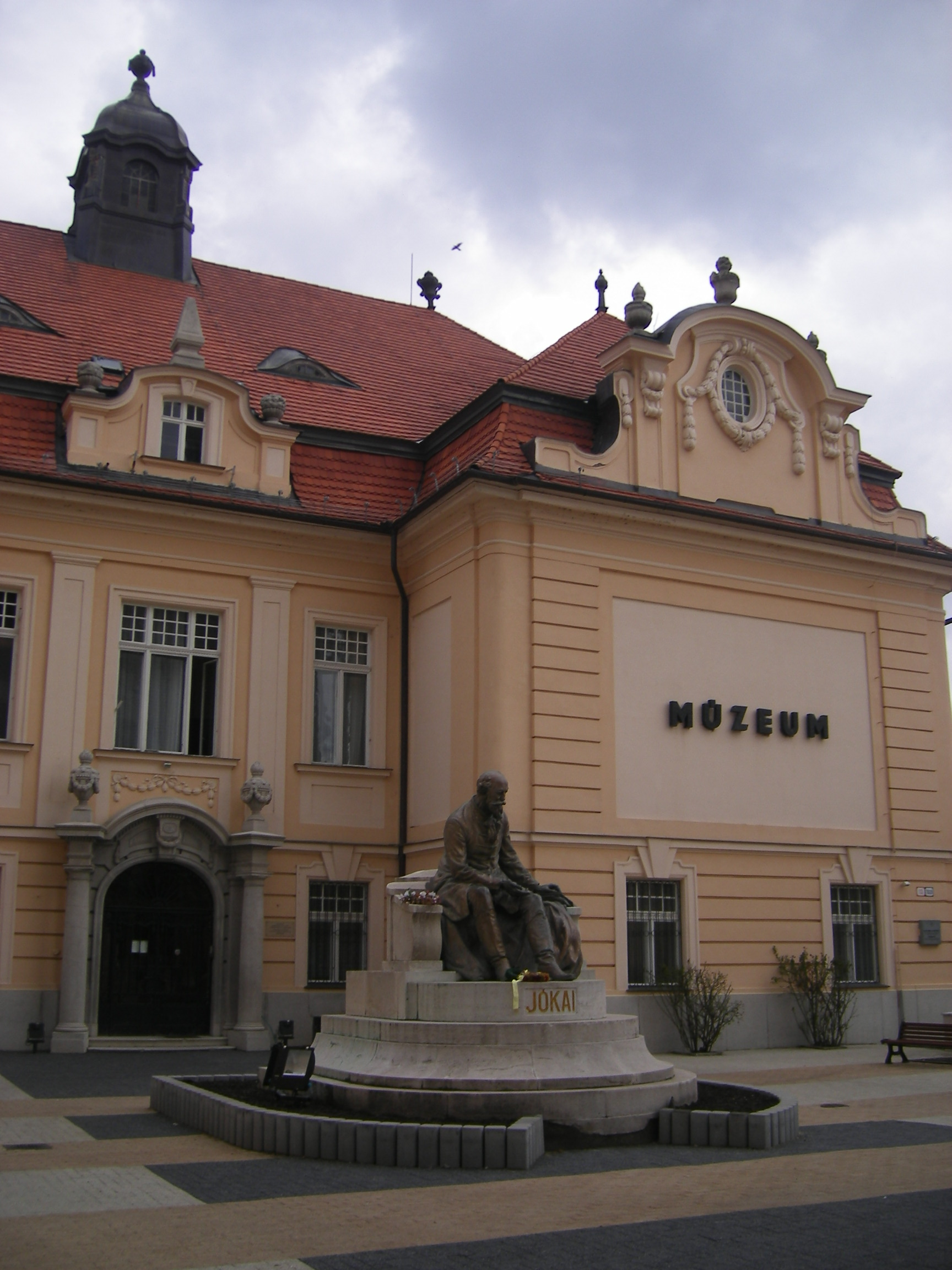

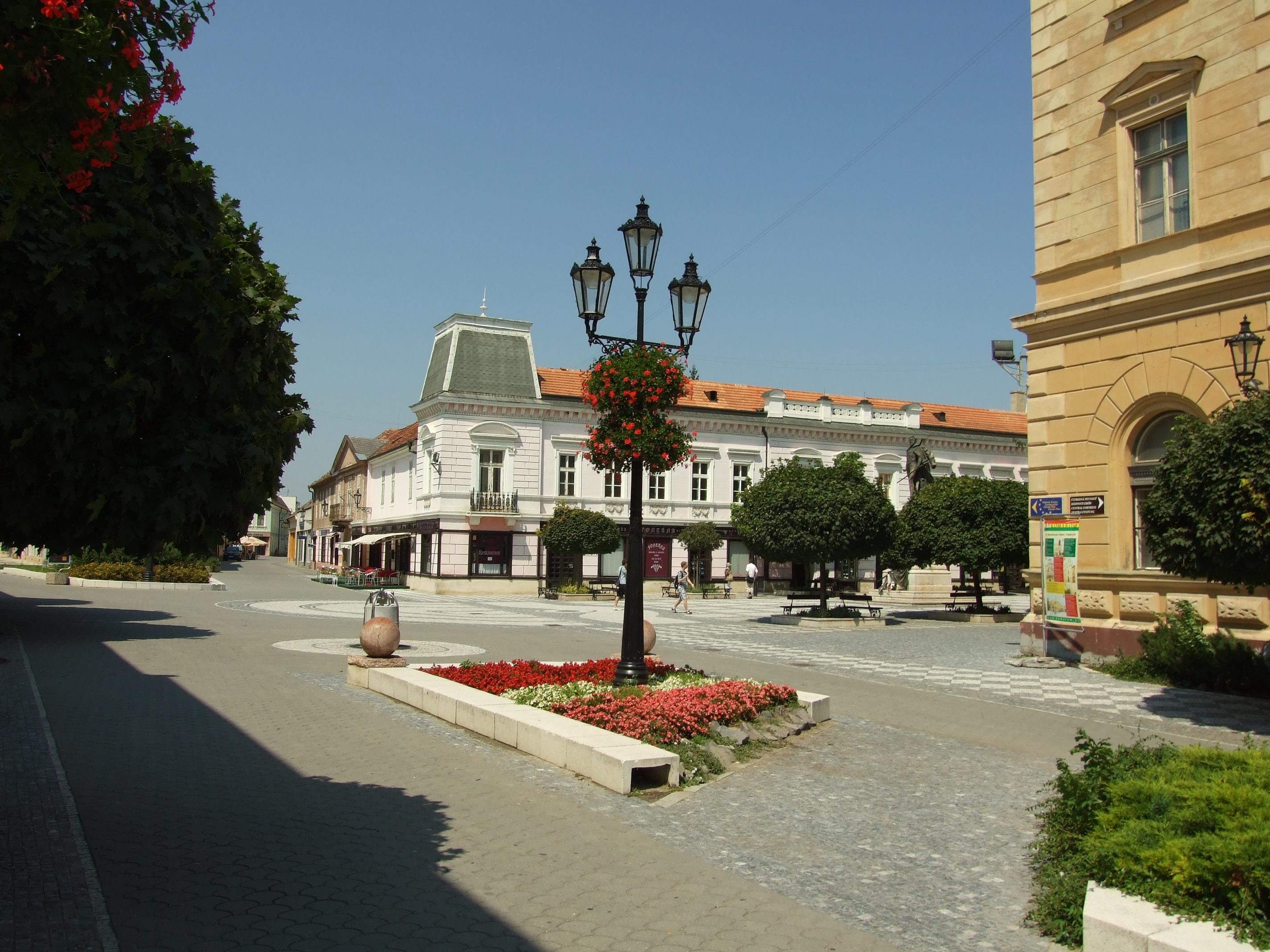
Zichy palace

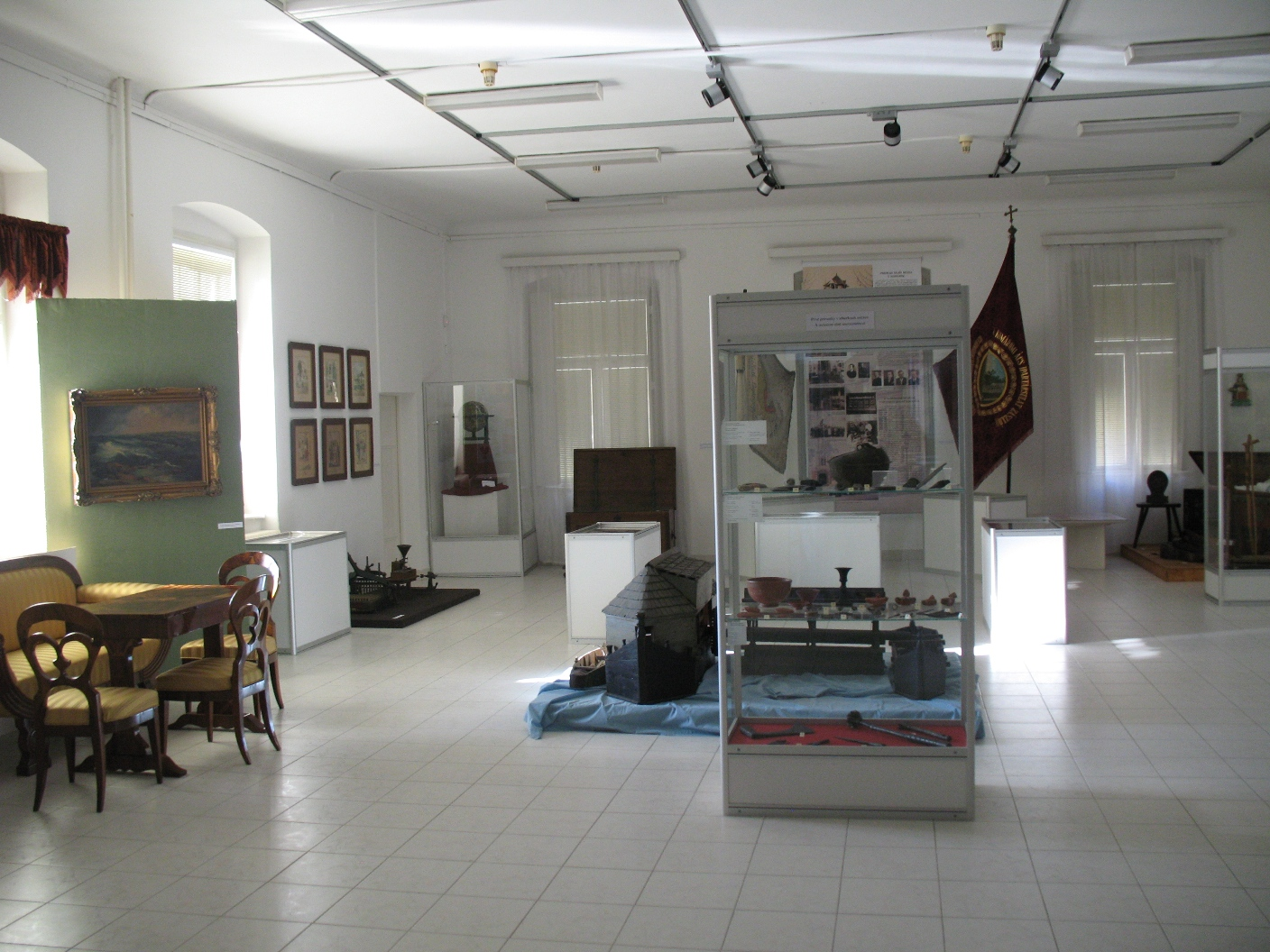
2012

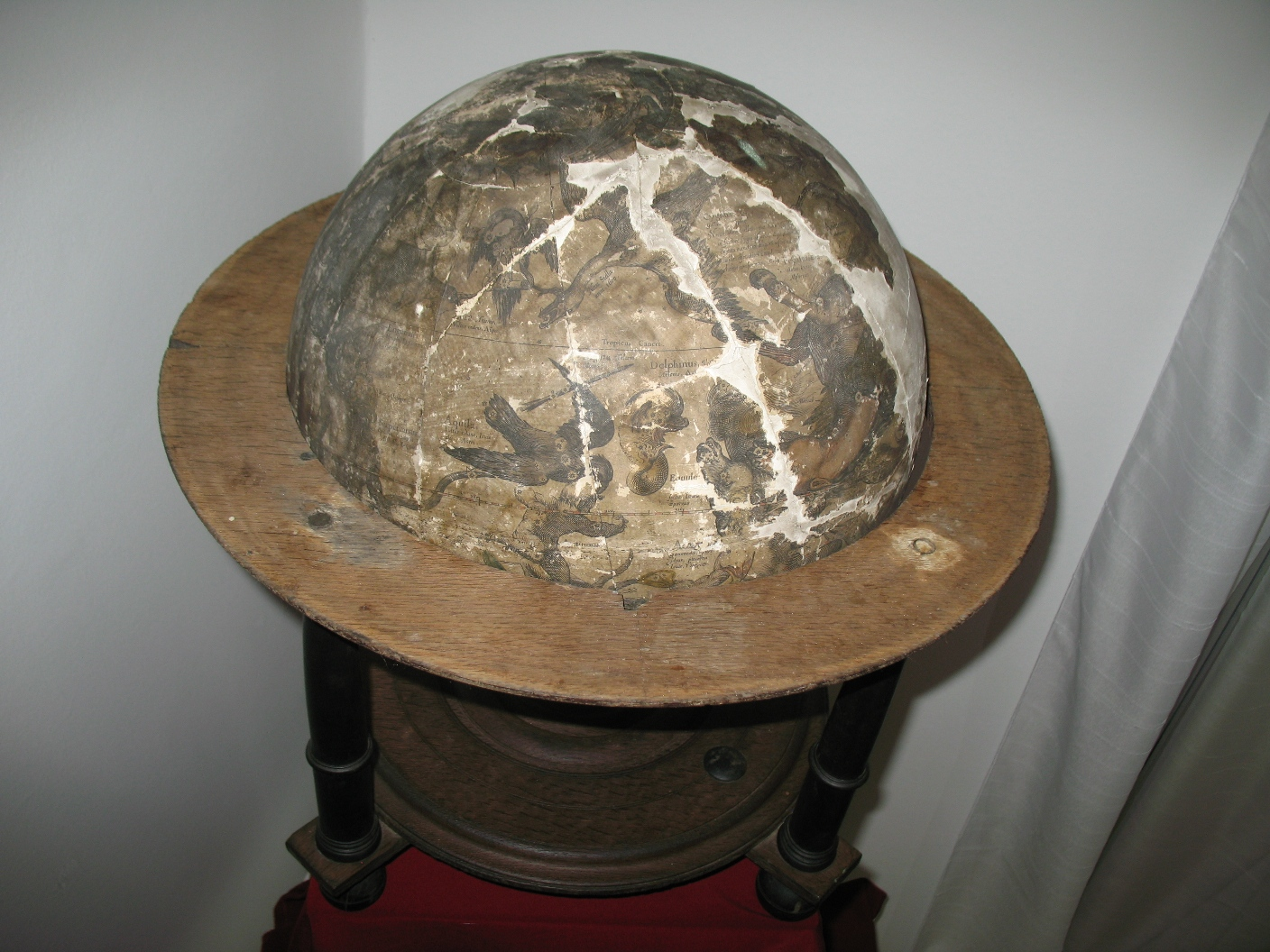
Celestial sphere of Willem Jansz Blaeu (1603)

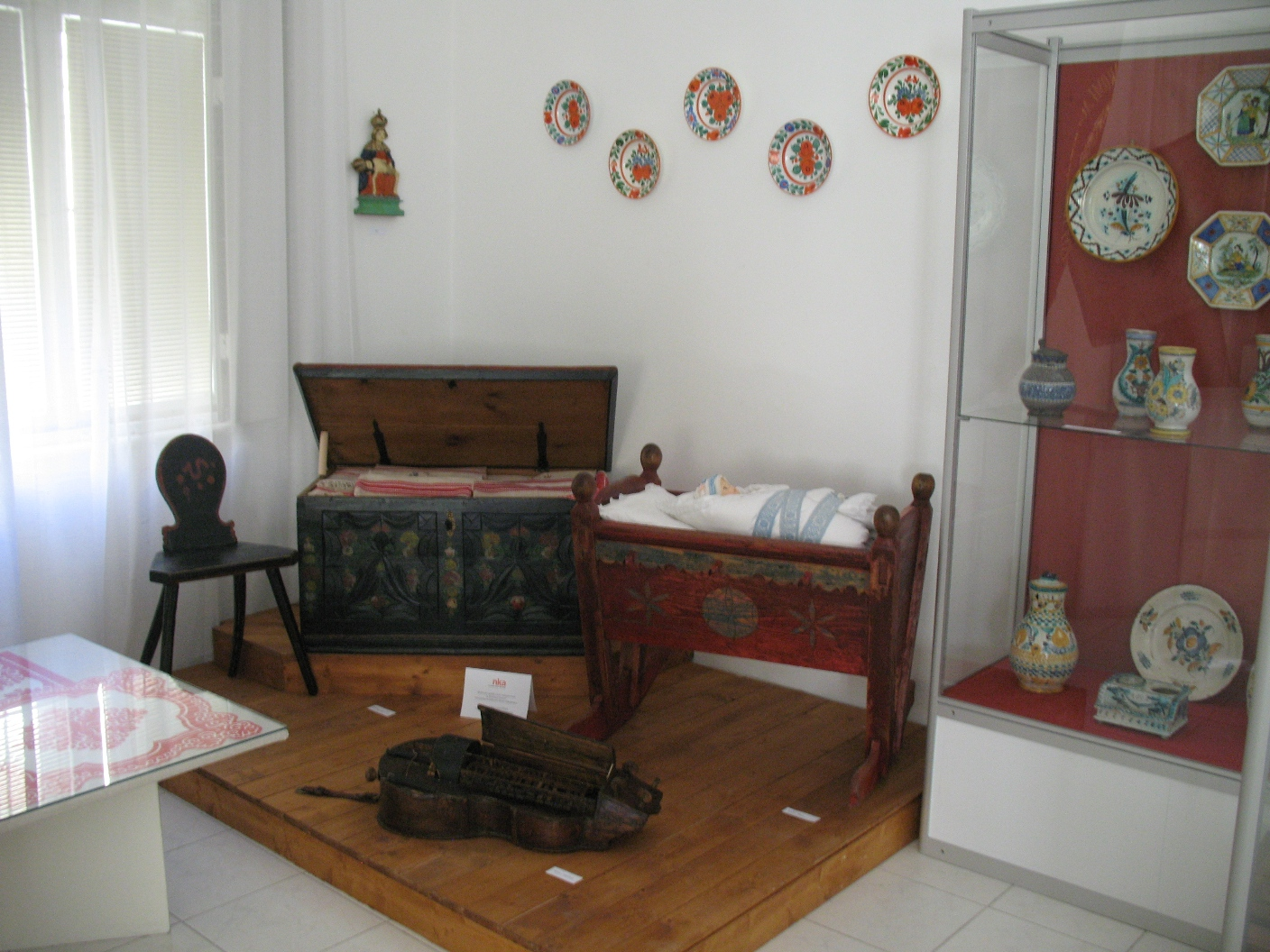
Ethnology

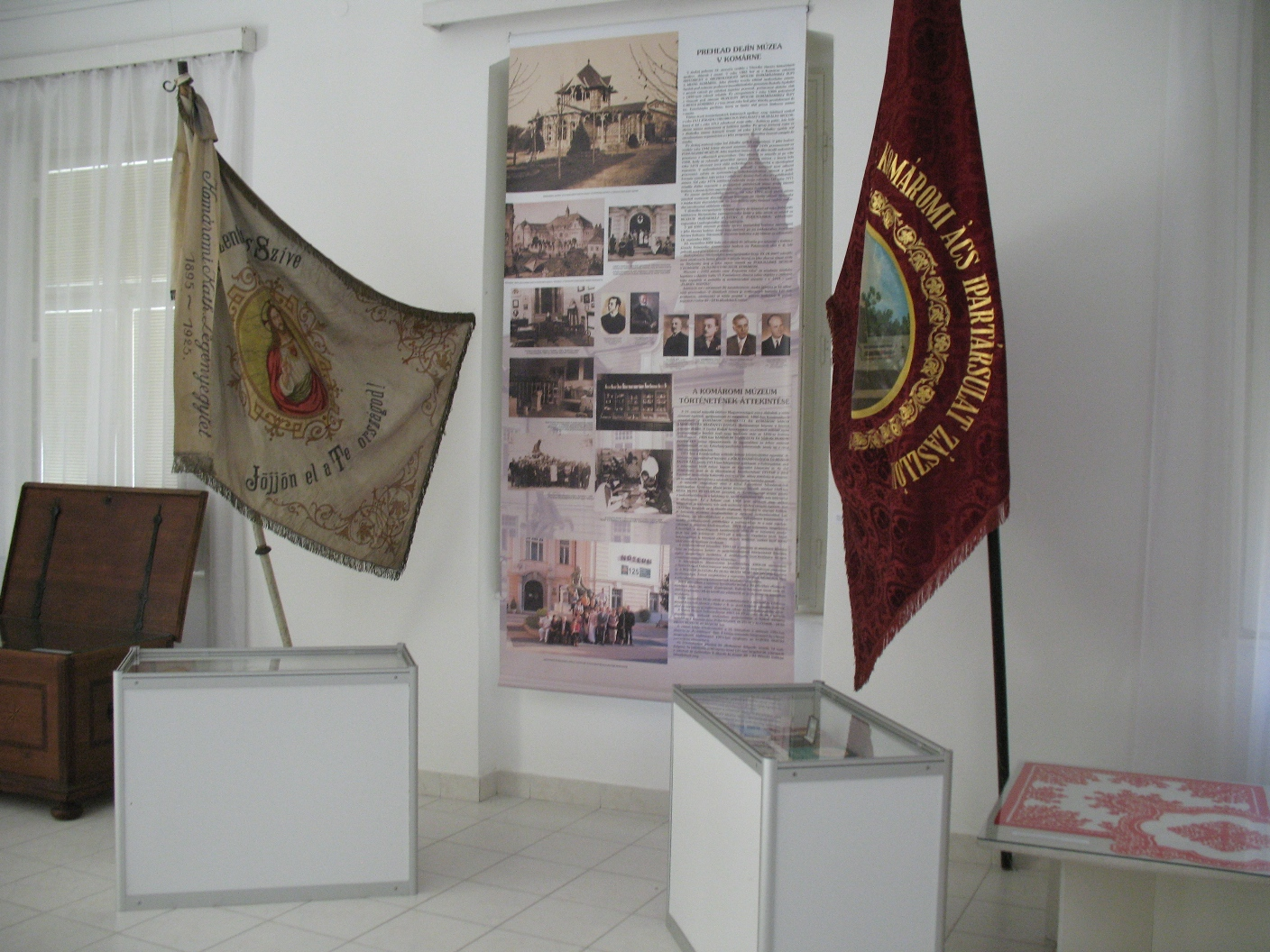
Flags

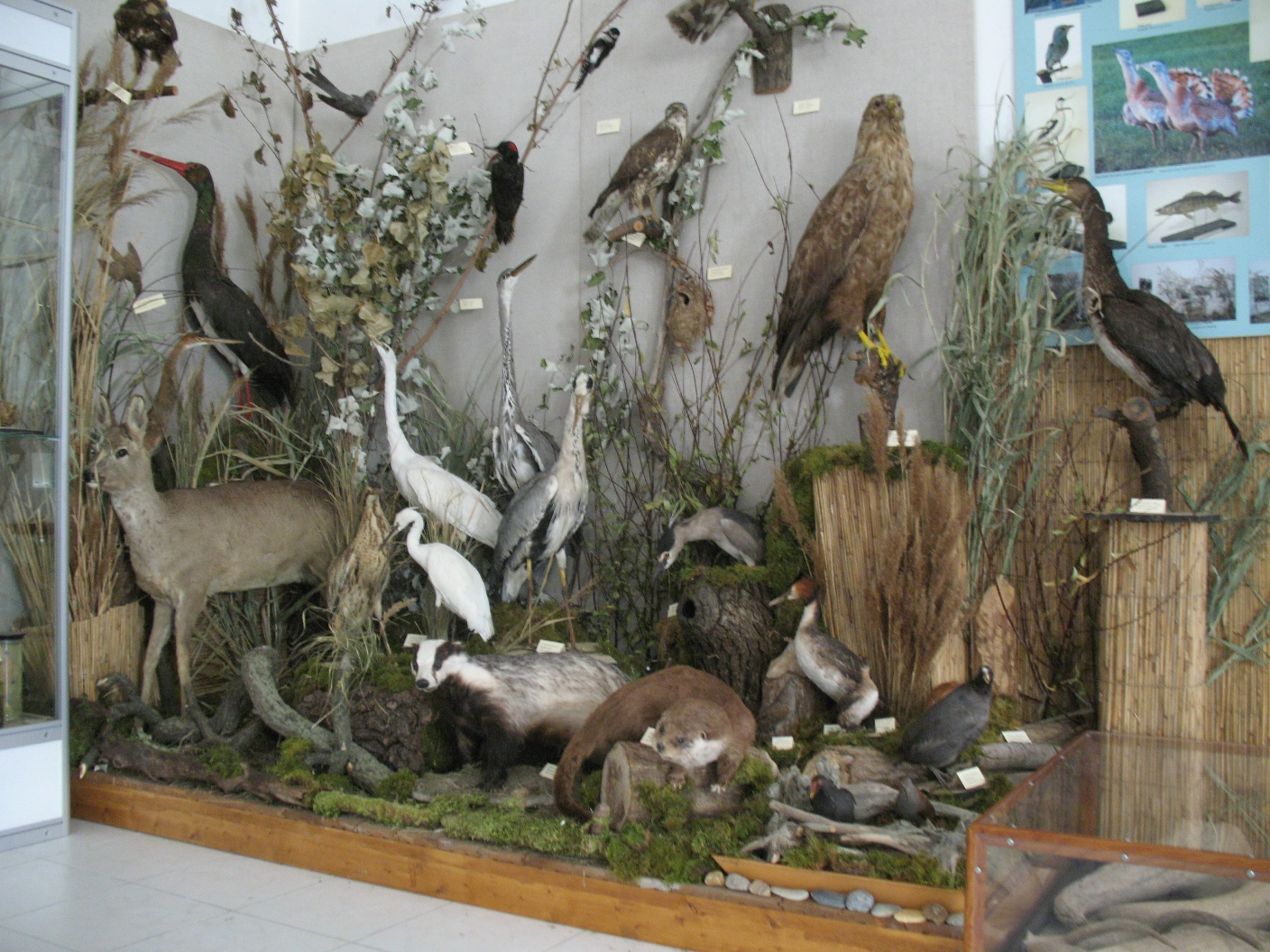
Zoology
