= Slovak National Museum in Martin =

Slovenské národné múzeum Martin
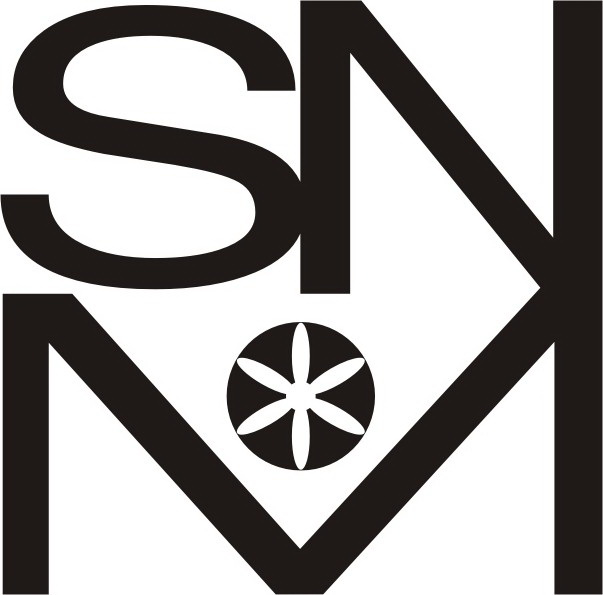
- Established: 1893
- Location: Martin
- Coordinates: 49°3′55.4″N 18°55′12.2″E
- Director: Dr. Mária Halmová

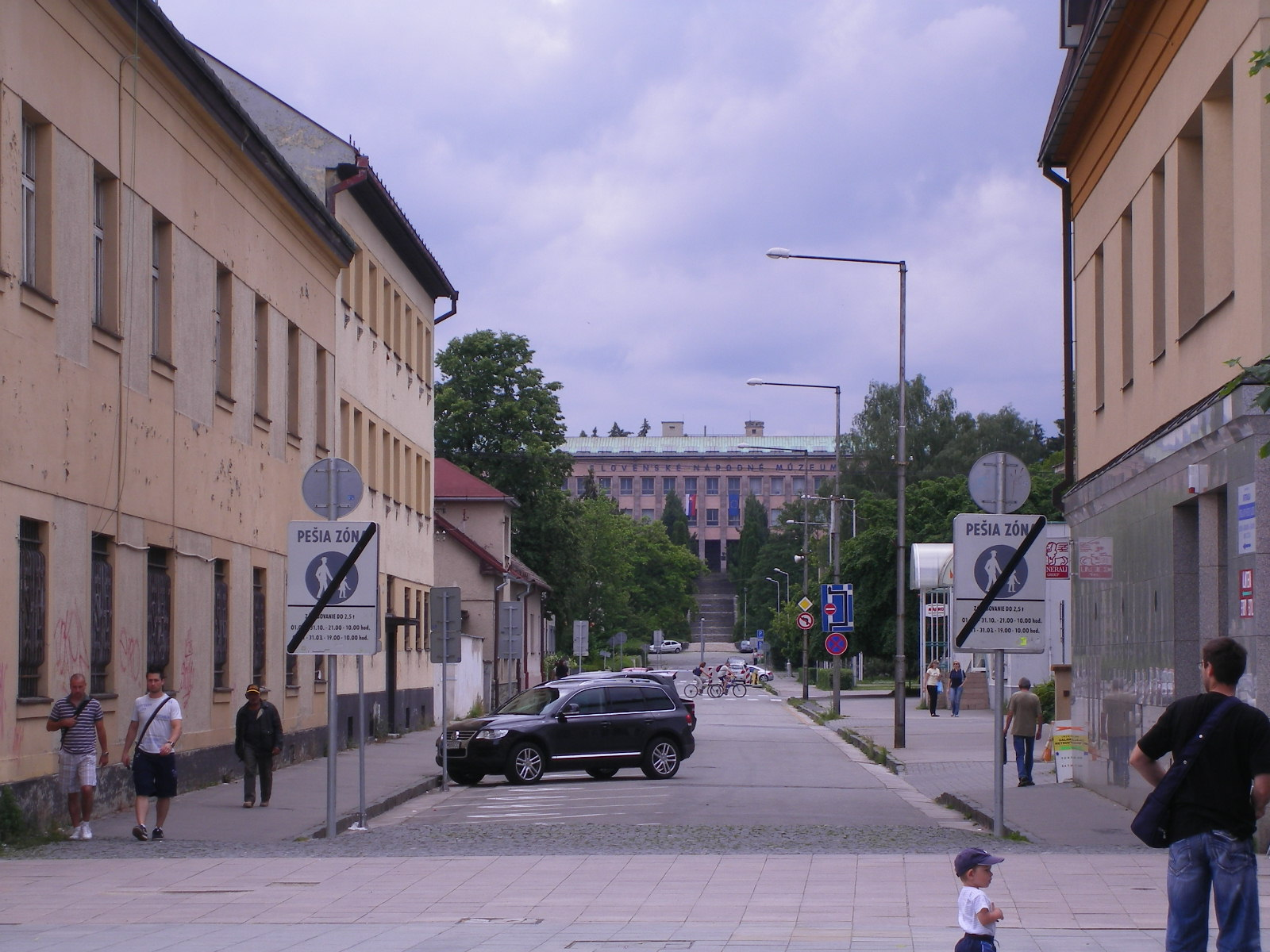
Martin - view toward Slovak National Museum

The Slovak National Museum in Martin (from 1961 - The Ethnographic Museum in Martin) is an ethnographically oriented branch of the Slovak National Museum, it's located in Martin, Slovakia.

== History ==
The Slovak National Museum in Martin is the oldest and the largest workplace in the Slovak National Museum. It dates backs to the end of the 19th century, and it is connected with the establishment of the Slovak Museology Society in (1893). The foundation, development, activity and accumulation of the SNM-MT collections in Martin are connected with the work of its founding father, Andrej Kmeť, and other important personalities from the Slovak history like Ján Geryk, an ethnographer, a director, an author of open-air museum in Martin. Since its establishment the museum has acquired collections of national-geographic and historical nature (ethnography, archaeology, history, numismatics, art-history, art and sculpture, archiving and library) from the whole territory of Slovakia and also from abroad. In 1961 it was merged with the Slovak Museum in Bratislava.

== Gallery ==
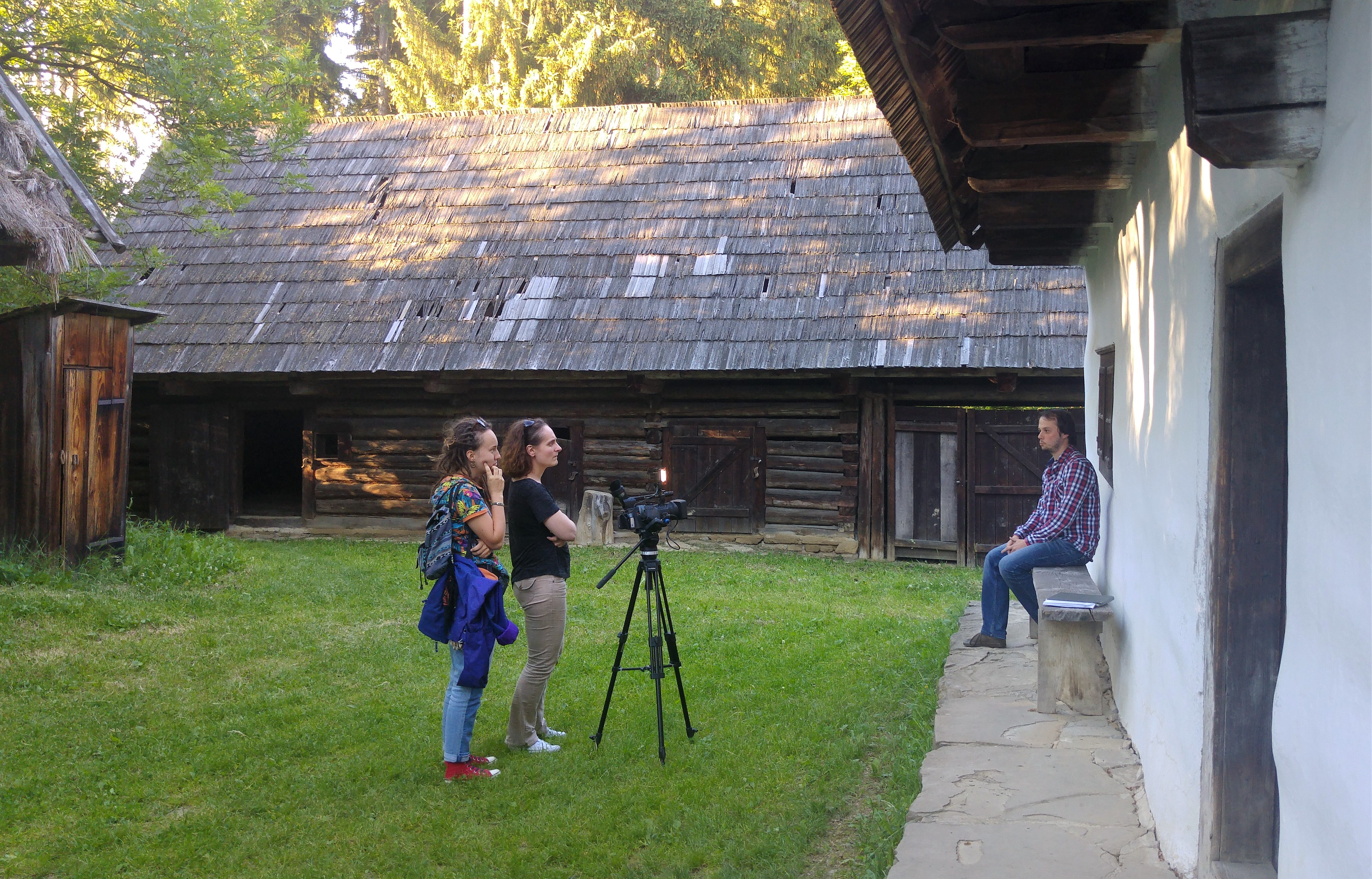
Wikipedians and museum workers doing interview in open-air museum in Martin

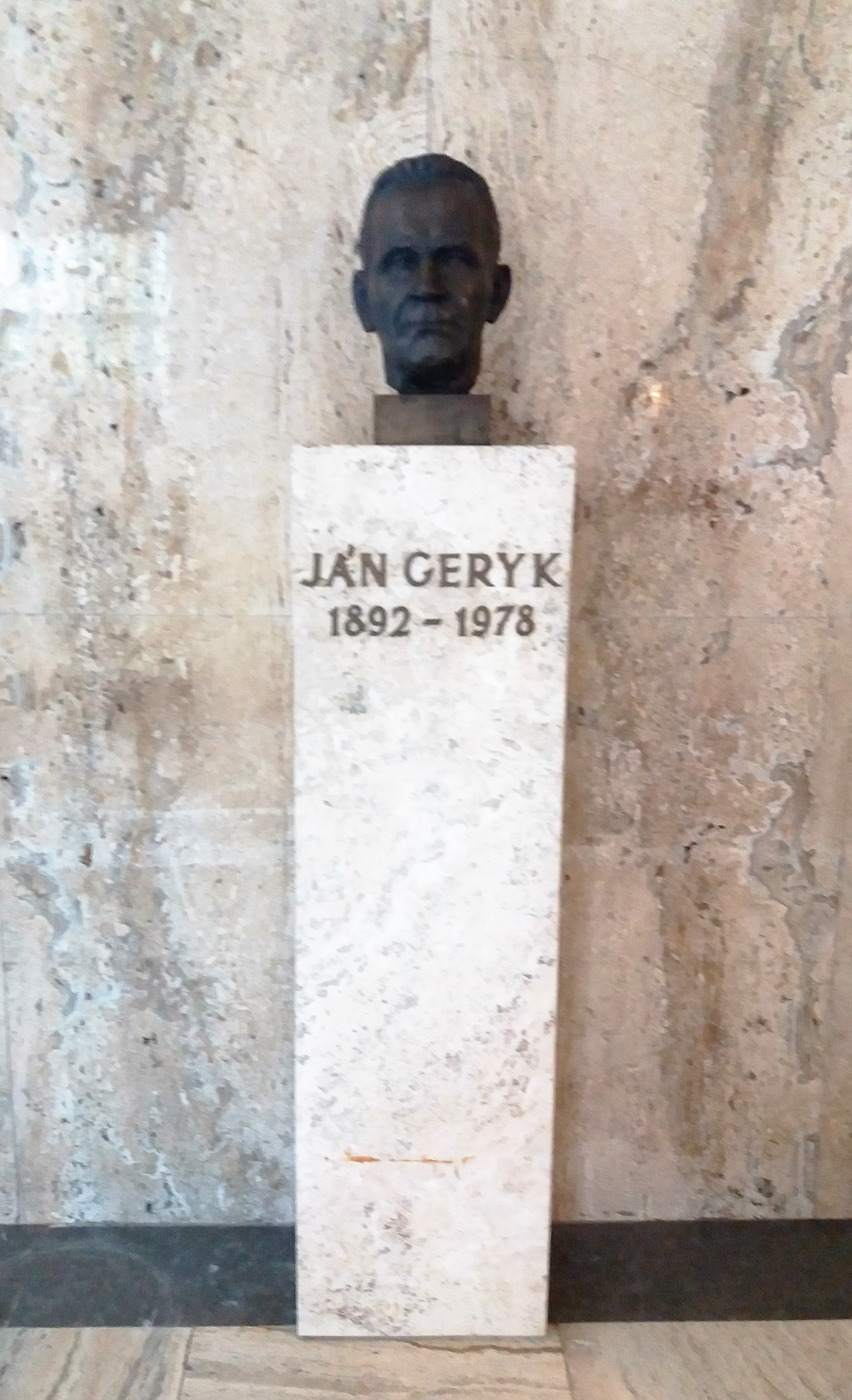
Jan Geryk's postument in the Museum's hall

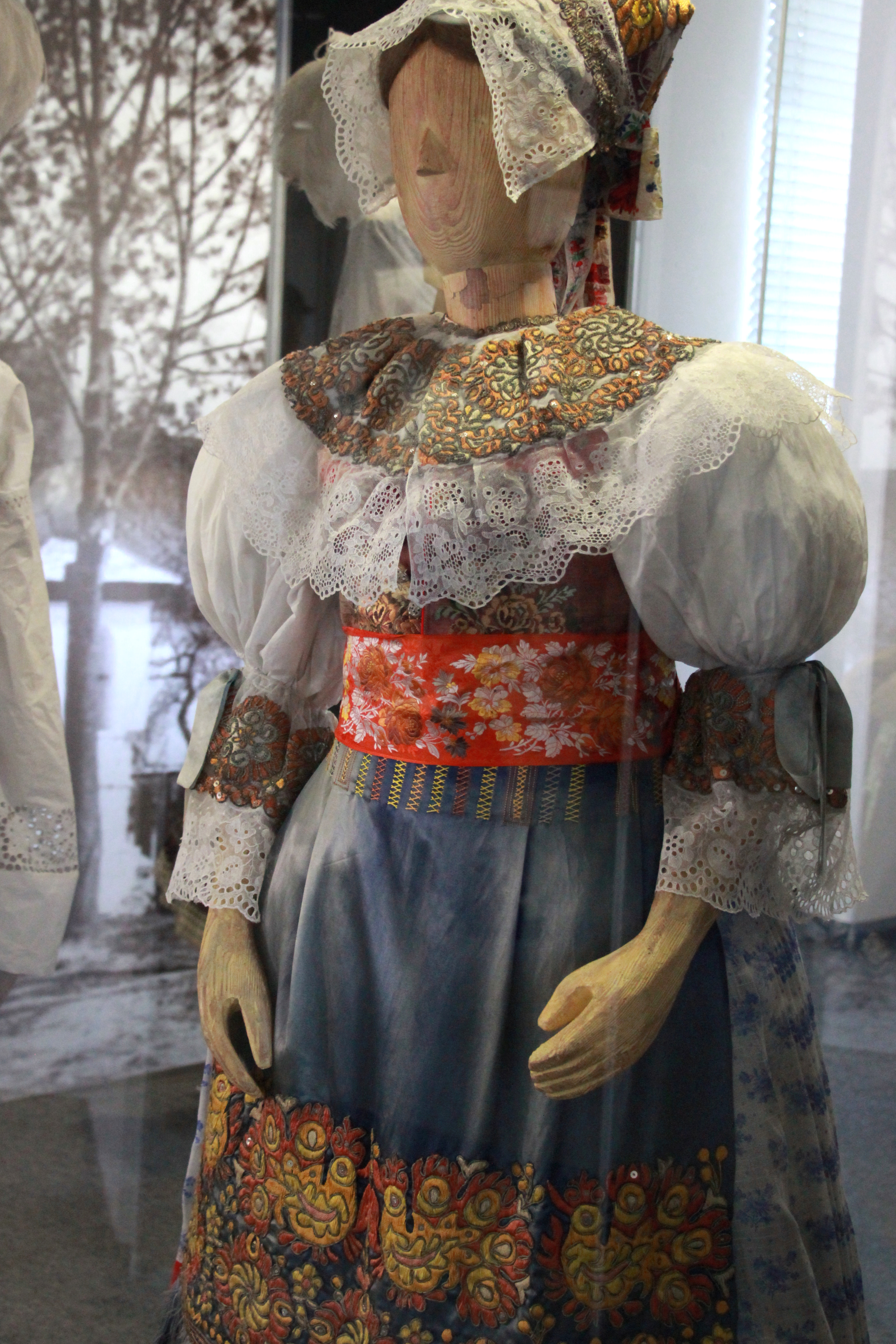
Folk costume from the core exhibition in the Ethnographic Museum in Martin

Curator of the folk costumes collection in the Museum of Ethnography, part of the Slovak National Museum, speaks about skirt and bonnet of the female folk costume from Trnava, Slovakia

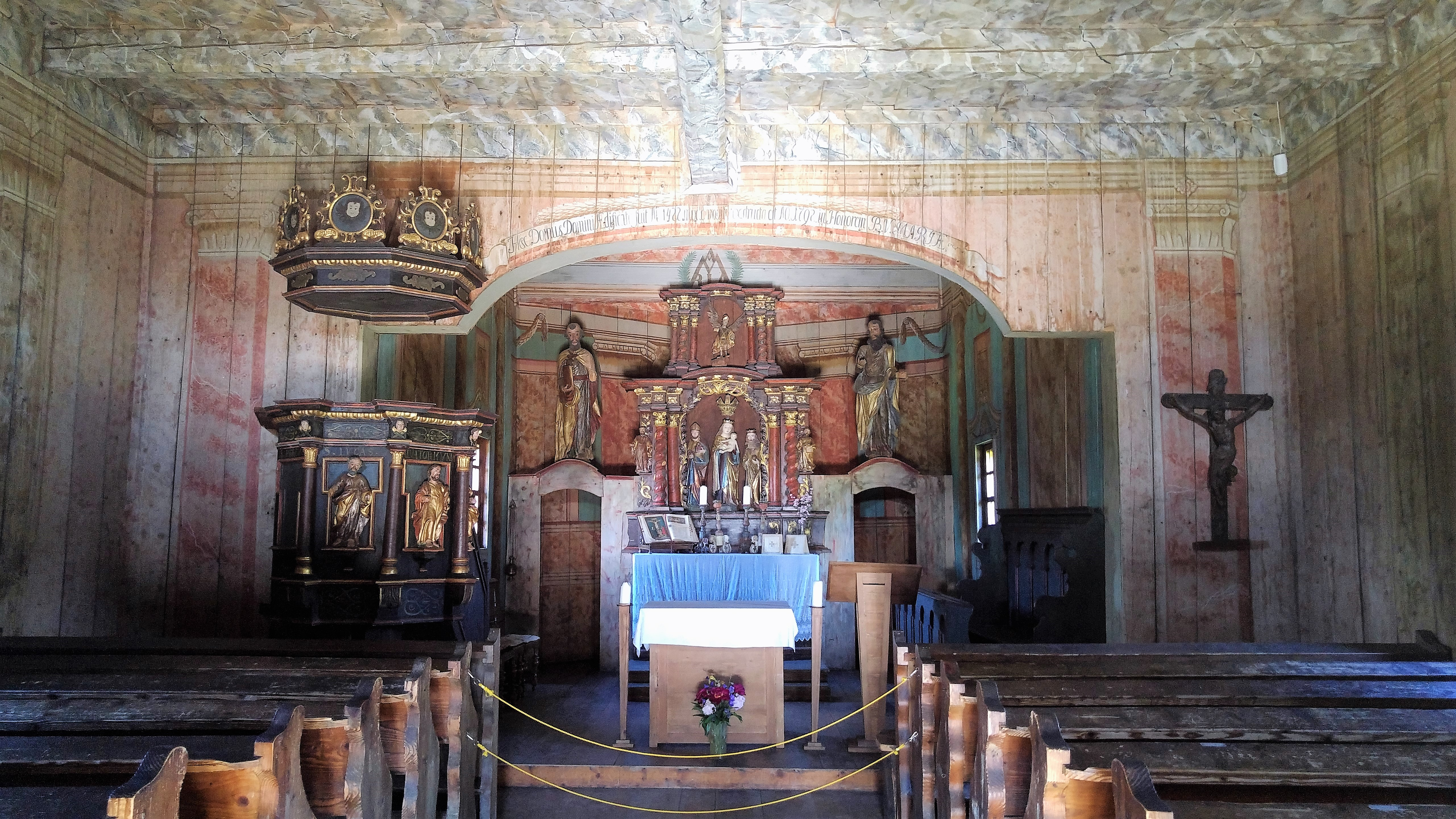

== See also ==
- Museum of the Slovak Village, Martin, Slovakia
