= Slovak Red Cross Museum =

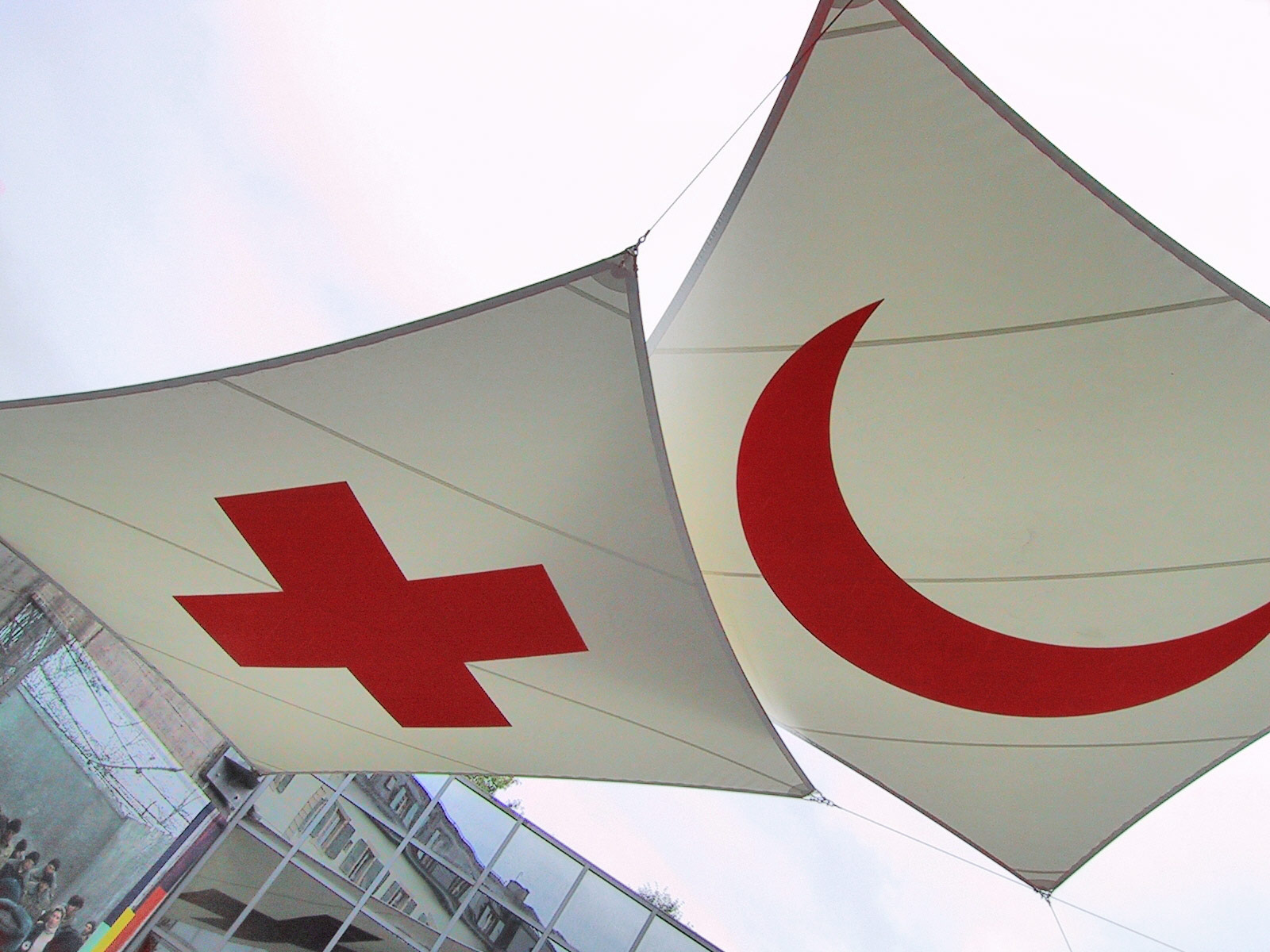
- The Red Cross and Red Crescent emblems
- Established: February 1, 2000
- Location: Martin, Slovakia
- Type: History
- Website: www.redcross.sk

The Slovak Red Cross Museum (Slovakian: Múzeum Slovenského Červeného kríža) or simply SCK Museum is a specialized museum of the Slovak Red Cross with a nationwide scope. The museum operates under the authority of the Supreme Board of the Slovak Red Cross as an independent entity registered in the Slovak Ministry of Culture's Museum register.

Its mission is to document, research, preserve, collect, interpret and exhibit significant objects and themes in the areas of Red Cross history and humanitarian history in the territory of what is now the Slovak Republic. It is also Slovak's largest archive on humanitarian history of Slovakia.

== History ==
In the year 2000, the Supreme Body of the Slovak Red Cross entrusted Dr. Zora Mintalová - Zubercová to found the Slovak Red Cross Museum. The museum was established on February 1, 2000, and as soon as on February 24, 2000, it was ceremonially opened by an exhibition named "The Red Cross at Peace and War Times".

It is headquartered in the 1927 former dispensary building of the Red Cross in Martin, Slovakia. The town of Martin was choose as the seat of the Slovak Red Cross Museum, because it has got a long Red Cross tradition. In 1924 – 1938, Martin was the seat of the Slovak division of the Czechoslovak RC. This is mostly the credit of Dr. Alica Masaryková, the first president of the Czechoslovak RC (CSRC). She ensured and organized nationwide activities of the Red Cross from Martin: sanitary movement, nursing, humanitarian aid, activities of young CSRC members and many others. An extensive publishing activity of the CSRC had been associated with the names of renowned Slovak writers. The museum thoroughly documents and presents these history activities of the Red Cross in Slovakia.

== Activities ==
As a result of its scientific and research activities the museum provides 2 to 3 premiere exhibitions each year. It also publishes books and textbooks on humanitarian history as well as on Slovak Red Cross history. The SCK-museum offers through its school awareness program specialized lectures on international humanitarian law for schools and other organizations, to teach the students the basic humanitarian principles and to promote humanism among the young generation. Documents and catalogues of the museum archive are provided through the museum's science program to researchers and students for preparation of their projects, seminars, or theses.

In the year 2006 the SCK museum organized an international scientific conference "Červený Kríž, Alica G. Masaryková a Slovensko" under the patronage of the first lady of the Slovak Republic, Mrs. Silvia Gašparovičová. The conference was hosted in the Milan Rastislav Štefánik Institute in Martin. Among the 97 invited speakers and guests were also Sylvia Countess of Limerick, CBE; Dr. Marie L. Neudorflova from the Czech Academy of Sciences, Dr. Bohumila Ferenčuhová from the Slovak Academy of Sciences etc.

=== Publications ===
- Red Cross in Slovakia in the years 1919-1938, ISBN 80-969221-9-X.
- Red Cross in Slovakia in the years 1939-1947, ISBN 80-89208-03-7.
- Otázky a odpovede o Medzinárodnom hnutí Červeného kríža a Červeného polmesiaca - Questions and Answers about the International Red Cross and Red Crescent, ISBN 80-07-01458-6
- Red Cross, Alica G. Masaryková and Slovakia, ISBN 80-969550-8-X
