= Museum of the Slovak Village =

Open-air museum in Slovakia

Coordinates: 49°2′38″N 18°55′27″E

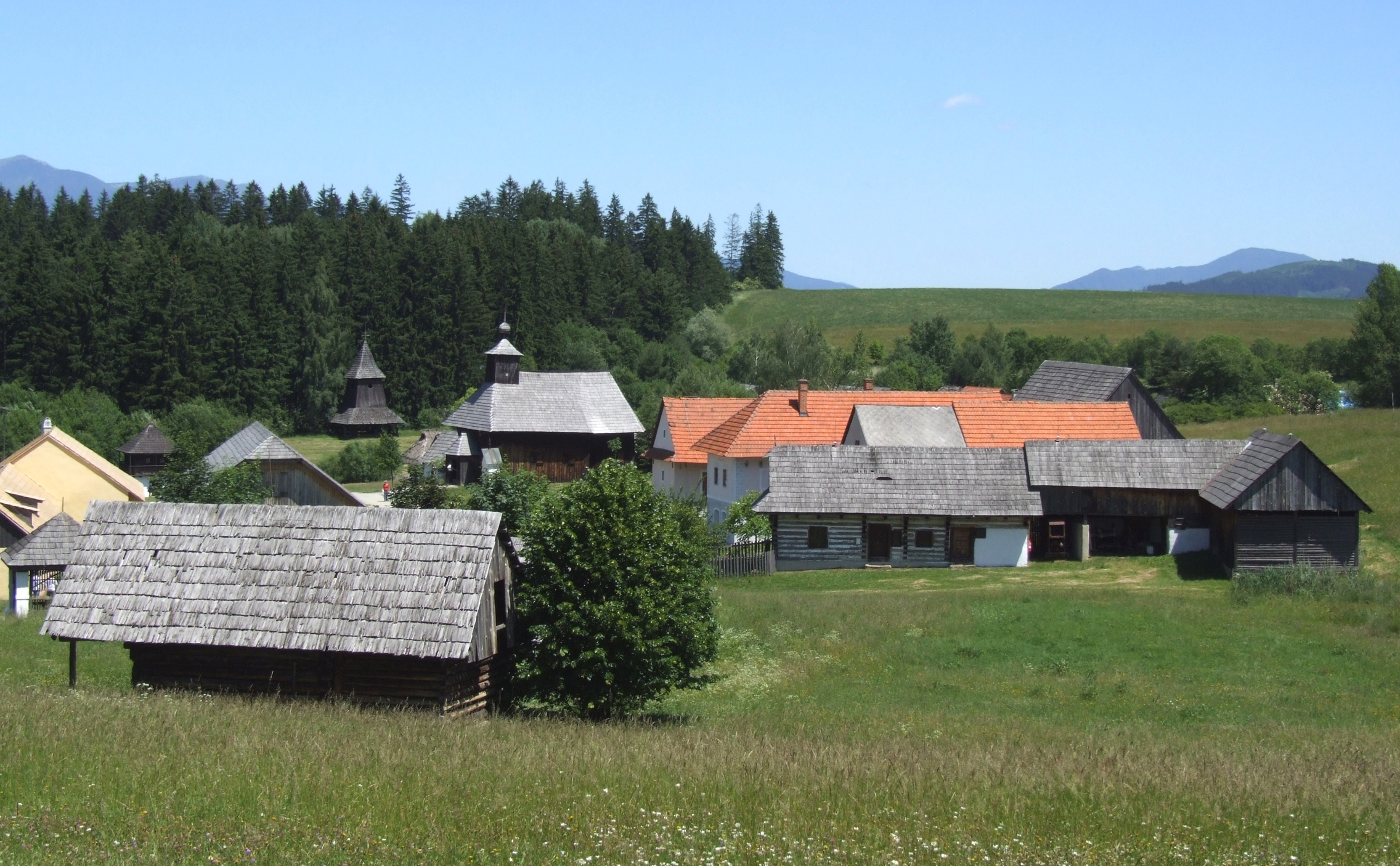
View of the museum

The large open-air Museum of the Slovak Village (in Slovak: Múzeum slovenskej dediny) is situated on the outskirts of the northern city of Martin in Slovakia.

== History ==
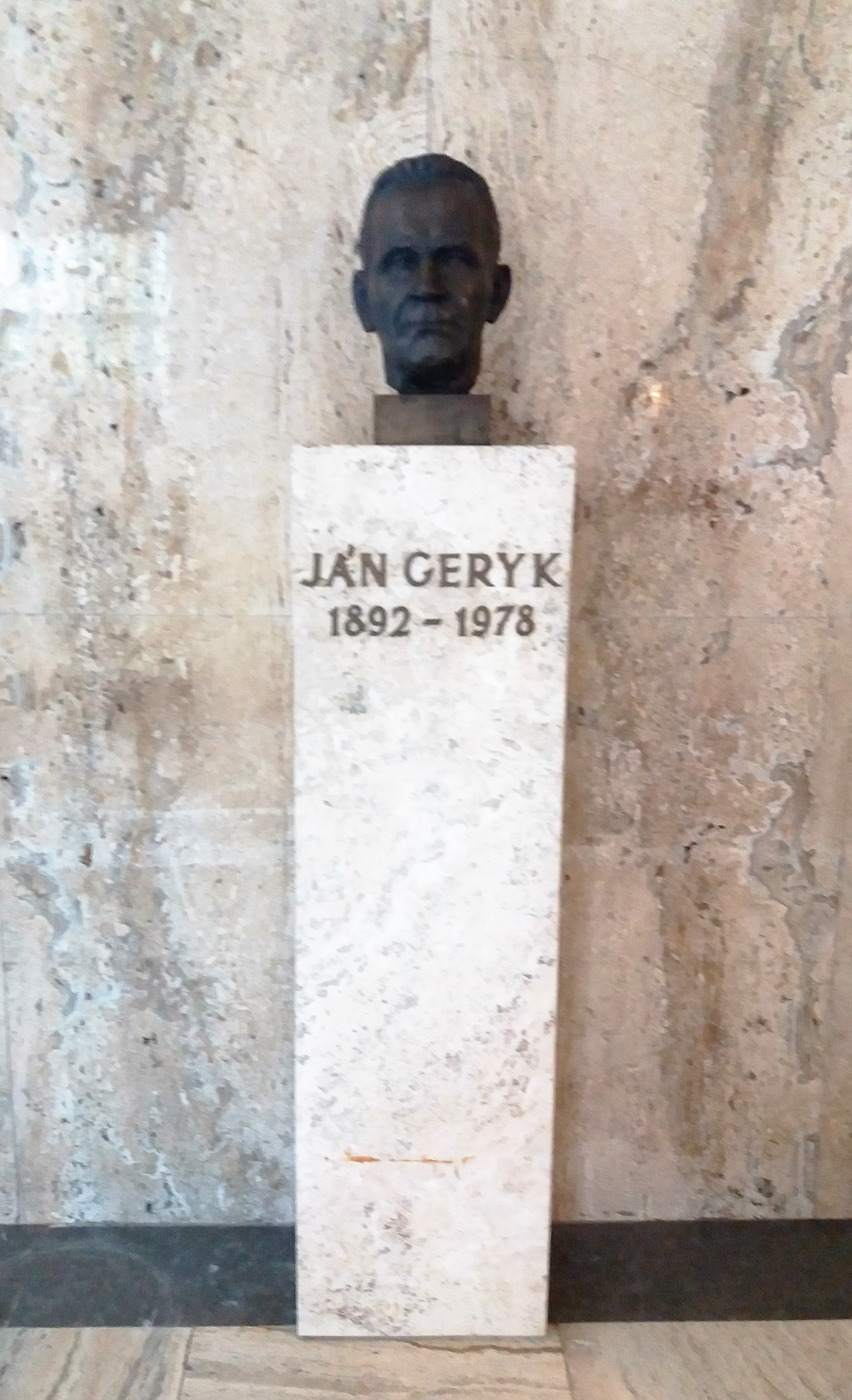
Jan Geryk - an ethnographer and director of the Museum; sculpture situated in the museum's hall.

The first idea of the open-air museum was put forward by Ján Geryk, the SNM secretary, on 16 April 1931 and it was thought to be built in Opleta. The museum was planned around Scandinavian designs of open-air museums and was mentioned to be real-life place for whole families: they would live and work there "in the old way of life". Finally, the museum was established in the 1961, by the Slovak National Museum in Martin and in 1964-66 the 218 objects from 113 villages were selected to create the reconstructed village settlements from 13 regions. The foundation stone of the Museum of Slovak Village was laid on 3 September 1968. The first group of buildings was of the Orava region and was open to public in 1972.

== Objects ==
The museum presents northwest Slovak traditional folk architecture, typical in its habitation and lifestyle of traditional rural communities in Slovakia from the 19th to the early 20th century. In an area of 15,5 hectares there are 129 dwelling, farm, technical, social, and religious buildings. Besides many domestic buildings, there are for example croftlofts, a pub, a village store, a garden house, a firehouse, a wooden Renaissance bellhouse, an elementary school, and an exhibition on Romano Drom (Journey of Gypsies). In this open-air museum, visitors can see interesting technical objects – such as vegetable (mainly flax) oil production, worsted production and weaving cloth. These buildings are from different Slovak regions – Orava, Liptov, Turiec and Kysuce-Podjavorniky. 22 objects (mainly agricultural homesteads) are furnished and open to visitors. Agricultural exhibitions show the cultivation of traditional plants, trees, spices, medicinal and magic herbs.

One of the most interesting objects is Catholic church from Rudno (1792) with its decorative paintings and Baroque altar with statutes of St. Stephen, St. Nicolas and Virgin Mary inside.

== Other ==
At the Museum of the Slovak Village, various events are held every year. These whole-day events show or reconstruct traditional professions, production and handicrafts, ceremonies, traditional manners and folklore. For instance, Easter in the Countryside, Days of Firefighters, Children Sunday, Michal's Market or Christmas in the Countryside.

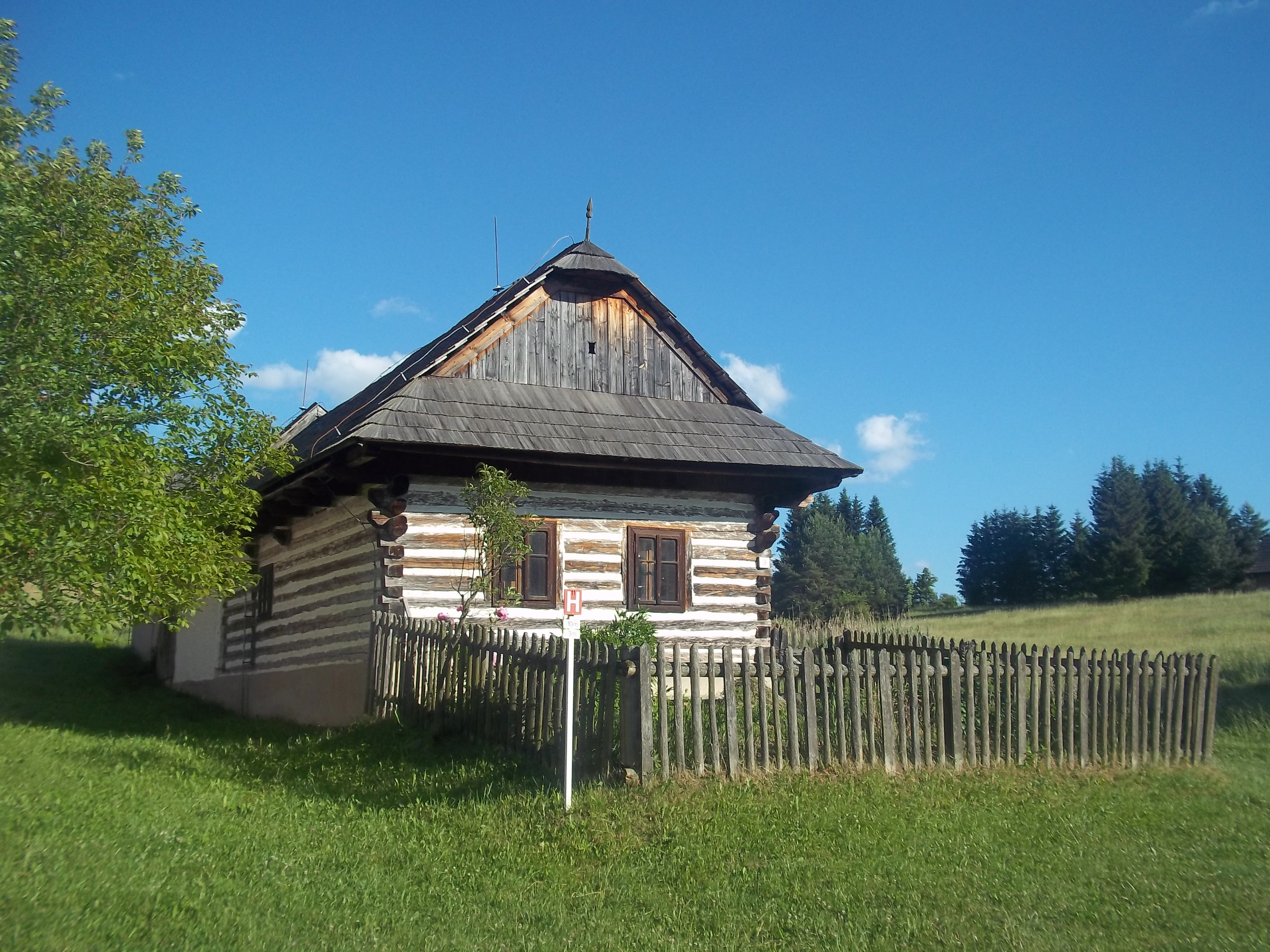
Museum of the Slovak Village, Martin, Slovakia.

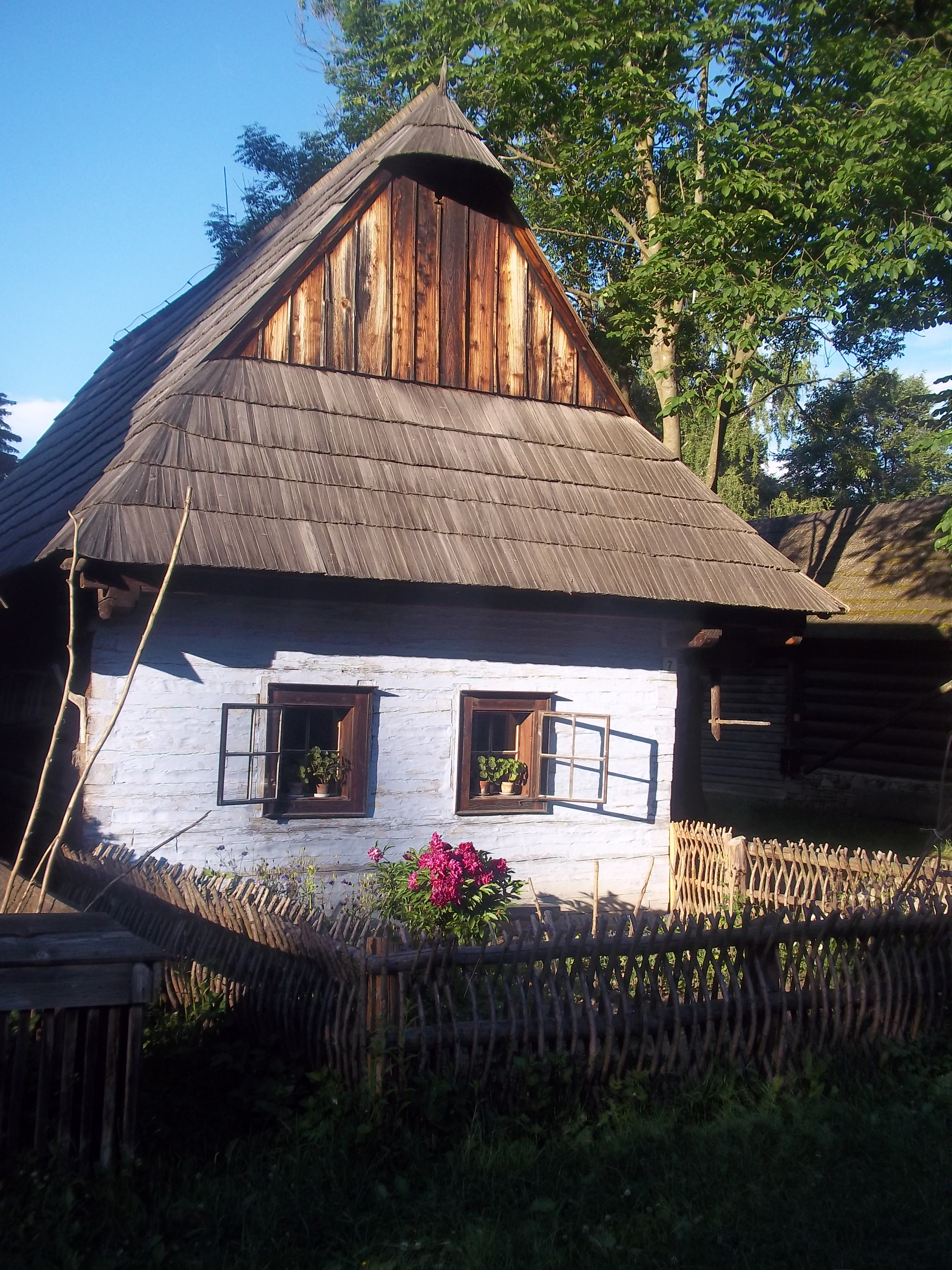
One of the objects in the Museum of Slovak Village, Martin, Slovakia

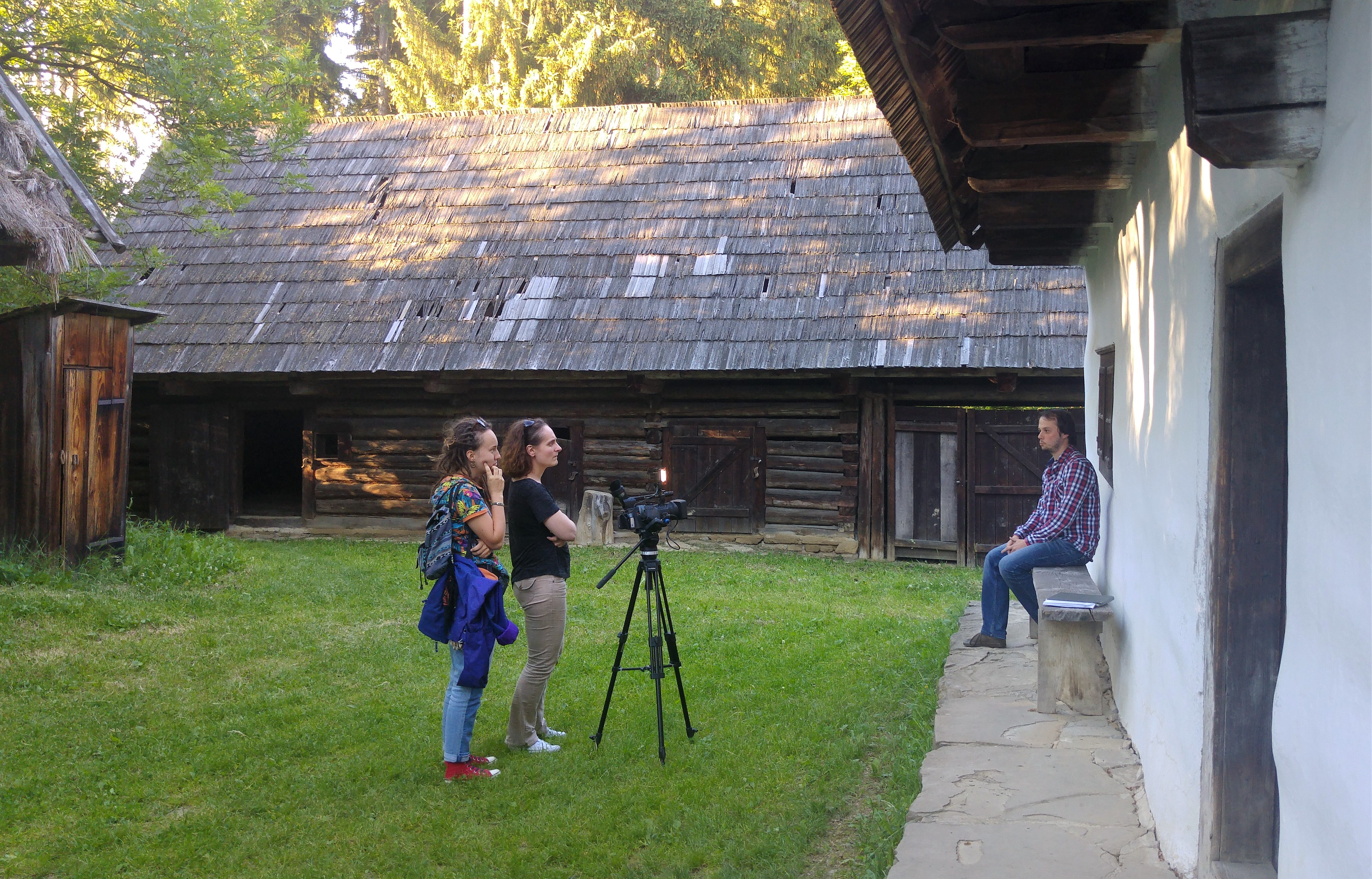
Wikipedians & museum workers during interview in the Slovak Village Museum

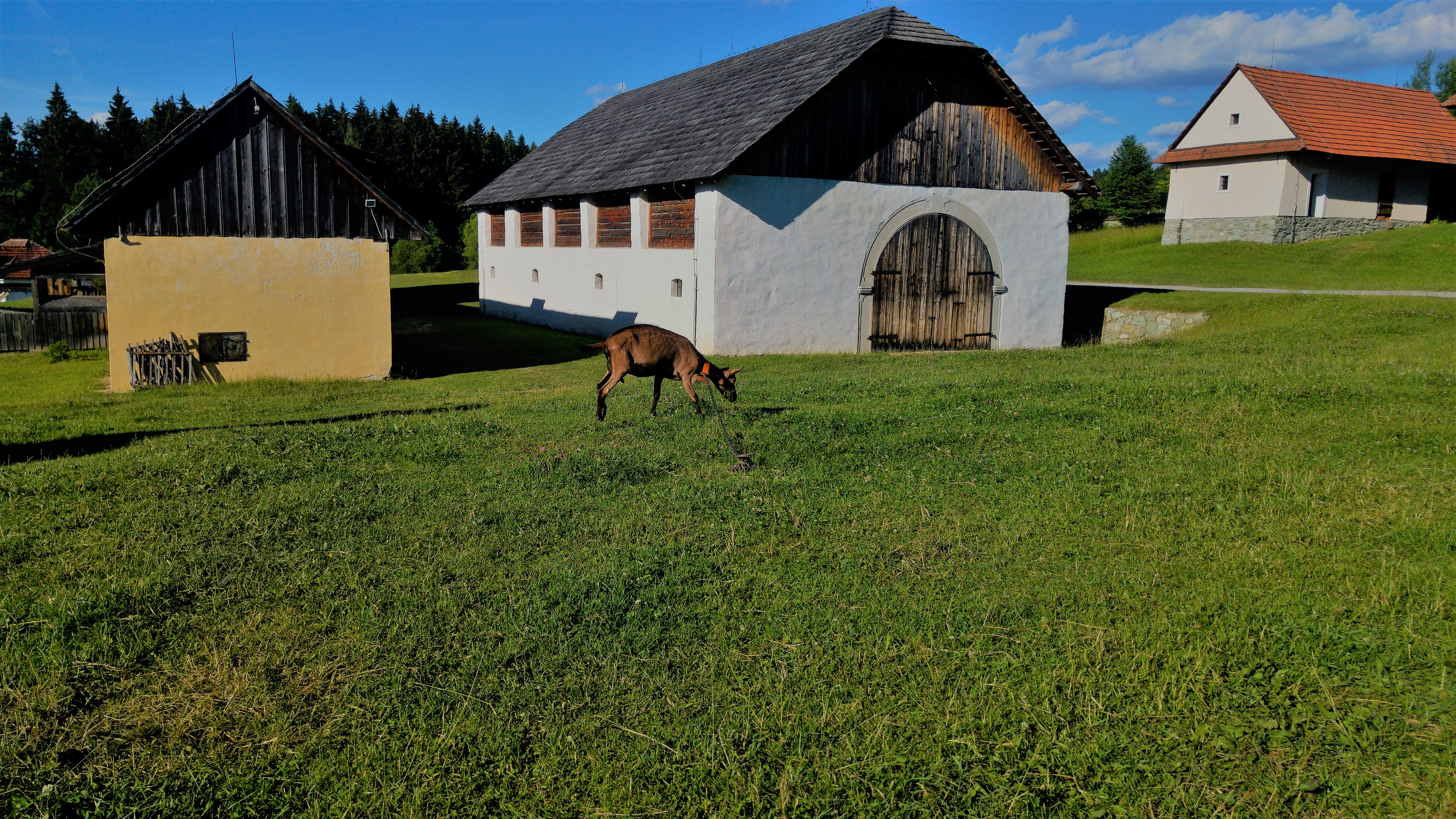
Museum of the Slovak Village

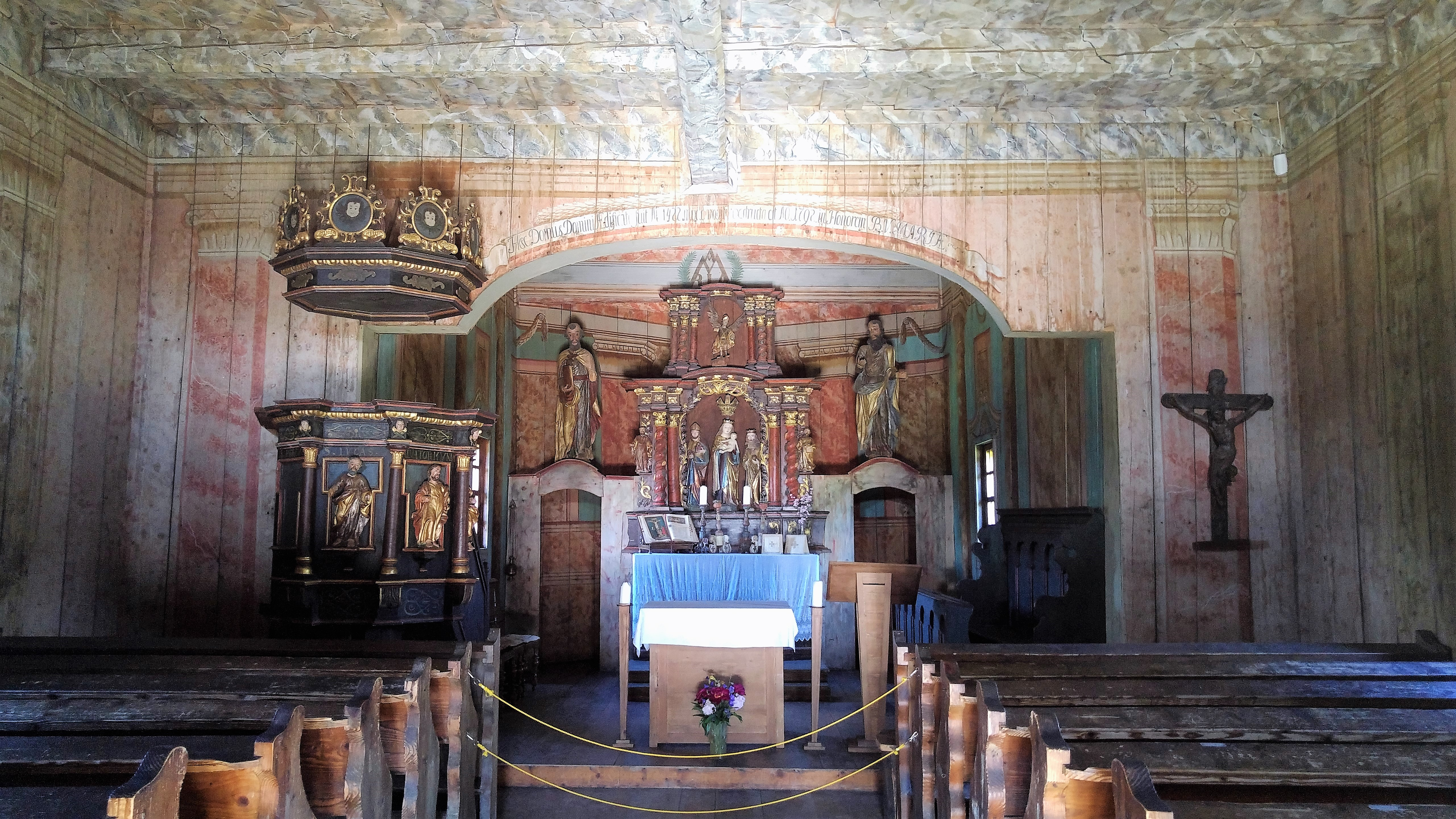
Interior of the church from Rudno in the Slovak Village open-air museum.

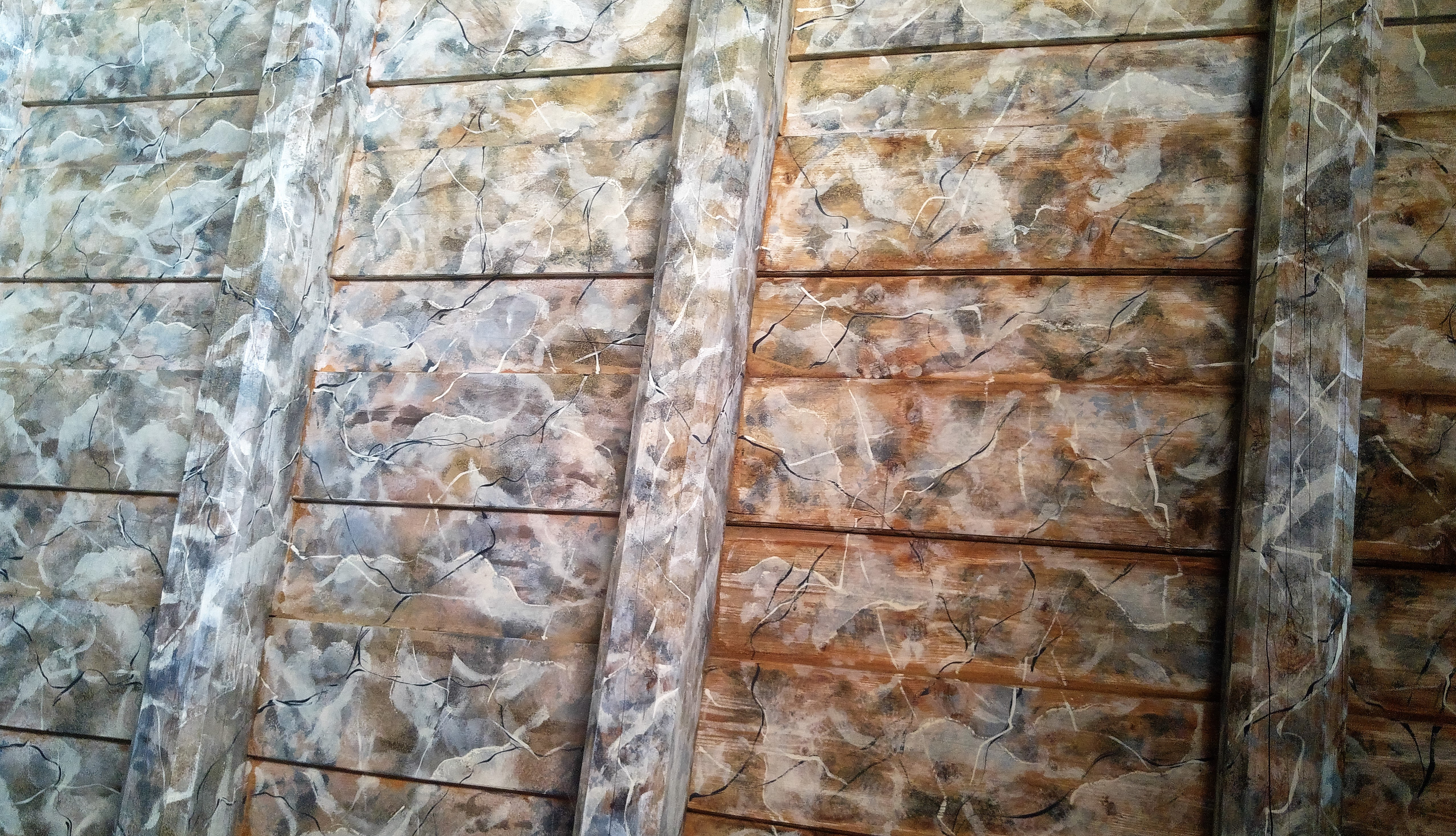
A detail of ceiling in the church from Rudno.
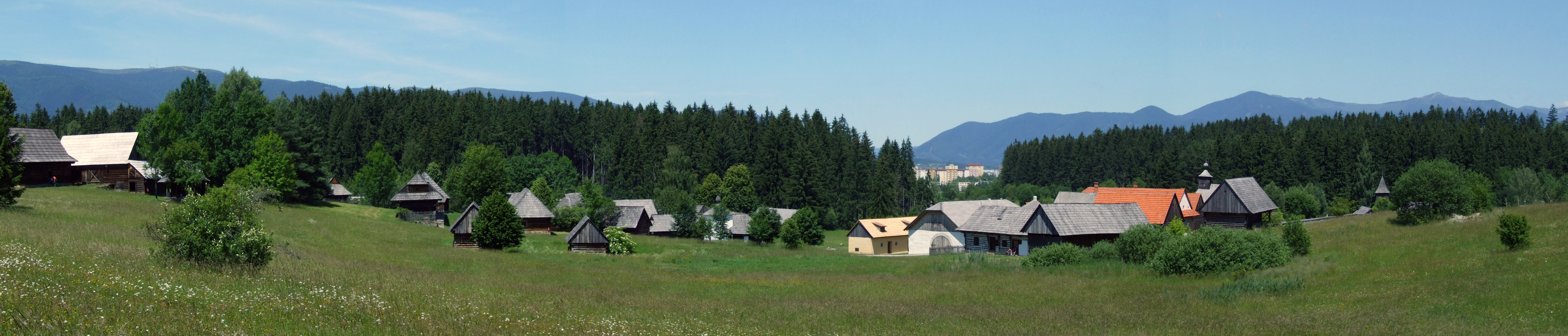
Panoramic view of the museum.

== Services for visitors ==
Services available for visitors include:

- Guided tours or individual visits
- Refreshment and catering in a pub of Oravska Polhora
- Hire of spaces (family or business celebrations)
- Marriage ceremonies in a Roman Catholic church of Rudno
- Roman Catholic or Evangelistic masses during events
- Souvenir shop with postcards, professional publications and folk-art products
- Creative workshops for elementary schools
