= Timeline of Bratislava =

Coordinates: 48.143889°N 17.109722°E

The following is a timeline of the history of the city of Bratislava, Slovakia.

== Prior to 17th century ==
- 2nd C. BCE – Gerulata Roman military camp established.
- 9th C. CE – Castle built.
- 907 – July 4–7: Battle of Pressburg.
- 1271 – Town captured by Ottokar II of Bohemia and on July 2 he signs a Peace treaty with Stephen V of Hungary.
- 1286 – City taken by "lords of Kysek".
- 1288 – Rathaus built.
- 1291 – Town privileges granted.
- 1297 – Franciscan Church consecrated.
- 1405 – Free royal town status granted.
- 1436 – Coat of arms of Bratislava adopted.
- 1452 – St. Martin's Cathedral consecrated.
- 1465 – Universitas Istropolitana established by Matthias Corvinus.
- 1490 – Universitas Istropolitana closed.
- 1491 – Peace treaty signed.
- 1529 – Saint James's Chapel and Church of St. Michael demolished.
- 1536 – City becomes capital of the Kingdom of Hungary.
- 1552 – Holy Crown of Hungary housed in Pozsony Castle.
- 1563 – September: Coronation of Hungarian monarchs Maximilian and Maria.
- 1572
  - September: Coronation of Hungarian monarch Rudolf.
  - Roland Fountain installed in Main Square.
- 1599 – Town Hall renovated.

== 17th century ==
- 1606 – Lutheran Lyceum established.
- 1608 – November: Coronation of Hungarian monarch Matthias II.
- 1613 – March: Coronation of Hungarian monarch Anna of Tyrol.
- 1618 – July: Coronation of Hungarian monarch Ferdinand II.
- 1619 – City taken by forces of Gabriel Bethlen (until 1621).
- 1622 – July: Coronation of Hungarian monarch Eleanor Gonzaga.
- 1626 – Peace treaty signed.
- 1632 – Prepoštský Palace built.
- 1638
  - Protestant church built on Franciscan Square.
  - February: Coronation of Hungarian monarch Maria Anna of Spain.
- 1647 – June: Coronation of Hungarian monarch Ferdinand IV.
- 1655 – June: Coronation of Hungarian monarchs Eleanor Gonzaga and Leopold I.
- 1661 – St. Nicholas' Church built.
- 1666 – Summer Archbishop's Palace built (approximate date).
- 1672 – Column of the Virgin erected.
- 1680 – Chapel of Saint Rozalia built.
- 1687 – December: Coronation of Hungarian monarch Joseph I.

== 18th century ==
- 1704 – Rákóczi Uprising.
- 1710 – Plague.
- 1712 – May: Coronation of Hungarian monarch Charles III.
- 1714 – October: Coronation of Hungarian monarch Elisabeth Christine of Brunswick-Wolfenbuttel.
- 1727 – Trinitarian Church consecrated.
- 1730 – Jesenákov Palace built.
- 1741 – June: Coronation of Hungarian monarch Maria Theresa.
- 1743 – Esterházy Palace built.
- 1747 – Pálffy Palace built.
- 1754 – Notre Dame convent founded.
- 1758 – Michael's Gate rebuilt.
- 1760 – Grassalkovich Palace built.
- 1762 – Apponyi Palace and Balassa Palace built.
- 1763 – 28 June: 1763 Komárom earthquake.
- 1764 – Pressburger Zeitung begins publication.
- 1765 – House of the Good Shepherd built.
- 1769 – Aspremont Palace built.
- 1770 – Mirbach Palace and Erdödy Palace built.
- 1775
  - Old fortifications dismantled.
  - Palace Csaky built.
- 1776 – Sad Janka Kráľa (park) established.
- 1778 – Catholic cemetery established on Račianske mýto.
- 1780 – Magyar hírmondó newspaper begins publication.
- 1781
  - Primate's Palace built.
  - Protestant cemetery established on Račianske mýto.
- 1783
  - Presspurske Nowiny newspaper begins publication.
  - Landhaus built.
- 1784 – Hungarian capital city moves to Buda but remains the seat of parliament until 1848.
- 1790 – November: Coronation of Hungarian monarch Leopold II.

== 19th century ==
- 1802 – Hungarian parliament meetings begin.
- 1805 – Peace agreement signed between France and Austria.
- 1806 – Pressburg Yeshiva founded (approximate date).
- 1808 – September: Coronation of Hungarian monarch Maria Ludovika of Austria-Este.
- 1809 – City besieged by French forces.
- 1811 – Bratislava Castle destroyed by fire.
- 1825
  - September: Coronation of Hungarian monarch Caroline Augusta of Bavaria.
  - Pontoon bridge constructed over Danube.
- 1828 – Arena Theatre established.
- 1830 – September: Coronation of Hungarian monarch Ferdinand V.
- 1848 – Railway station built.
- 1850 – City designated capital of Military District of Preßburg.
- 1851 – Population: 43,463.
- 1860 – Holy Cross church consecrated.
- 1866 – July 22: Battle of Lamacs.
- 1868
  - Omnibuses begins operating.
  - City Museum established.
- 1870 – Esterházy Palace built.
- 1879
  - Pozsony Singing Society founded.
  - Church Mena Panny Márie built.
- 1885 – Johann Pálffy Palace built (approximate date).
- 1886 – City Theatre built.
- 1890
  - Konig-Franz-Josef Bridge built.
  - Population: 52,500.
- 1895 – Trams begin operating.
- 1898 – Pozsonyi Torna Egyesület football club formed.
- 1900
  - Petržalka Stadium opens.
  - Population: 61,537.

== 20th century ==
- 1902 – Westungarische Volksstimme newspaper begins publication.
- 1903 – March: Hungarian Zionist Congress held in city.
- 1908 – Church of St. Elisabeth built.
- 1909 – Trolleybuses begin operating.
- 1912 – Slávičie údolie cemetery established.
- 1919
  - City becomes part of Czechoslovakia.
  - March: City renamed "Bratislava."
  - Comenius University founded.
- 1921 – YMCA built.
- 1923
  - City becomes seat of Bratislava Region.
  - Vajnory Airport in operation.
- 1924 – Agricultural Museum founded.
- 1926 – Synagogue built.
- 1928 – School of Applied Arts founded.
- 1929 – Radio Symphony Orchestra formed.
- 1937 – University of Technology established.
- 1939 – City becomes capital of First Slovak Republic.
- 1940 – College of Commerce established.
- 1942 – Slovak Academy of Sciences and Botanical Garden of the Comenius University established.
- 1943 – Karlova Ves village annexed to city.
- 1945
  - April 4: Soviet Army defeats occupying German forces.
  - Old Bridge rebuilt.
- 1946
  - Devín, Dúbravka, Lamač, Petržalka, Rača, and Vajnory villages annexed to city.
  - Nova Scena Theatre founded.
- 1948
  - Communists in power.
  - New Town Hall built in Primate's Square.
  - Slovak National Gallery established.
- 1949
  - Academy of Fine Arts and Design, Academy of Performing Arts, and Slovak Philharmonic established.
  - Új Szó newspaper begins publication.
- 1951 – M. R. Štefánik Airport opens.
- 1953
  - Museum of Pharmacy active.
  - School of Library and Information Studies established.
- 1957 – Bratislava Castle restoration begins.
- 1959 – Gymnázium Jura Hronca established.
- 1960
  - Slavín military monument unveiled.
  - Bratislava Zoo opens.
- 1961 – Slovak National Museum and Bratislava City Gallery established.
- 1964 – Population: 262,380 (approximate).
- 1966 – Institute of Further Education of Physicians and Pharmacists relocates to Bratislava.
- 1967 – Incheba built.
- 1968 – August 3: Soviets sign Bratislava Declaration.
- 1969 – City becomes capital of Slovak Socialist Republic.
- 1970 – Ladislav Martinák becomes mayor.
- 1972
  - Čunovo, Devínska Nová Ves, Jarovce, Podunajské Biskupice, Rusovce, Vrakuňa, and Záhorská Bystrica villages annexed to city.
  - Novy Most bridge constructed.
- 1974 – Television tower constructed.
- 1975 – Bratislava Jazz Days festival begins.
- 1980 – Fountain installed in Námestie Slobody.
- 1981 – Istropolis cultural center built.
- 1983
  - Central State Archives building established.
  - Cappella Istropolitana chamber orchestra formed.
- 1984 – Technopol built.
- 1985
  - Dukla Heroes' Bridge built.
  - Population: 413,002 (estimate).
- 1988
  - March 25: Candle demonstration against communist regime.
  - Tower 115 built.
- 1989 – Velvet Revolution.
- 1990
  - Peter Kresánek becomes mayor.
  - Lafranconi Bridge opens.
  - Association of Slovak Archivists headquartered in city.
- 1991 – Bratislava Stock Exchange founded.
- 1992 – Museum of Jewish Culture established.
- 1993
  - City becomes capital of Slovak Republic.
  - Slovak Television begins broadcasting.
- 1994 – Bratislava Forest Park and Museum of Carpathian German Culture established.
- 1995 – Evangelical Church opens.
- 1998
  - Jozef Moravčík becomes mayor.
  - Bratislava-Petržalka railway station rebuilt.
- 1999
  - International Film Festival Bratislava begins.
  - Bratislava Transport Museum opens.
- 2000 – Polus City Center shopping mall opens.

== 21st century ==
- 2001
  - Tatracentrum built on Hodžovo námestie.
  - Aupark shopping mall opens.
  - Museum of Hungarian Culture in Slovakia established.
- 2002
  - Andrej Ďurkovský becomes mayor.
  - Prievoz viaduct opens.
  - National Bank of Slovakia and Chatam Sofer Memorial built.
  - Slovak Medical University established.
- 2003
  - HIT Gallery founded.
  - Church of Saint Family built.
- 2004 – Slovakia joins European Union.
- 2005
  - Apollo Bridge opens.
  - February: USA-Russia meeting held.
  - Museum of Croatian Culture in Slovakia established.
- 2006 – City Business Center I built.
- 2007
  - Sitina Tunnel and Slovak National Theatre open.
  - Aupark Tower built.
- 2010
  - Eurovea opens.
  - August 30: 2010 Bratislava shooting.
  - Milan Ftáčnik becomes mayor.
- 2012 – Population: 462,603.

== See also ==
- History of Bratislava
- List of Mayors of Bratislava
- Boroughs and localities of Bratislava
- Parks and gardens in Bratislava
- List of palaces in Bratislava
- Other names of Bratislava

== Bibliography ==
- Edward Brown (1673). "Presburg". Brief Account of Some Travels in Hungaria, Servia, Bulgaria, Macedonia, Thessaly, Austria, Styria, Carinthia, Carniola, and Friuli. London: Benj. Tooke.
- Richard Brookes (1786), "Presburg", General Gazetteer (6th ed.), London: J.F.C. Rivington
- Abraham Rees (1819), "Presburg", The Cyclopaedia, London: Longman, Hurst, Rees, Orme & Brown
- Charles Knight, ed. (1867). "Presburg". Geography. English Cyclopaedia. Vol. 4. London: Charles Knight. hdl:2027/nyp.33433000064810.
- Norddeutscher Lloyd (1896), "Pressburg", Guide through Germany, Austria-Hungary, Italy, Switzerland, France, Belgium, Holland and England, Berlin: J. Reichmann & Cantor, OCLC 8395555
- "Pressburg", Austria-Hungary, Including Dalmatia and Bosnia, Leipzig: Karl Baedeker, 1905, OCLC 344268
- "Pressburg" . Encyclopædia Britannica. Vol. 22 (11th ed.). 1910. p. 299.
- Benjamin Vincent (1910), "Presburg", Haydn's Dictionary of Dates (25th ed.), London: Ward, Lock & Co.
- "Slovakia: Bratislava", Eastern and Central Europe (17th ed.), Fodor's, 1996, OL 7697674M
