= Museums and galleries of Bratislava =

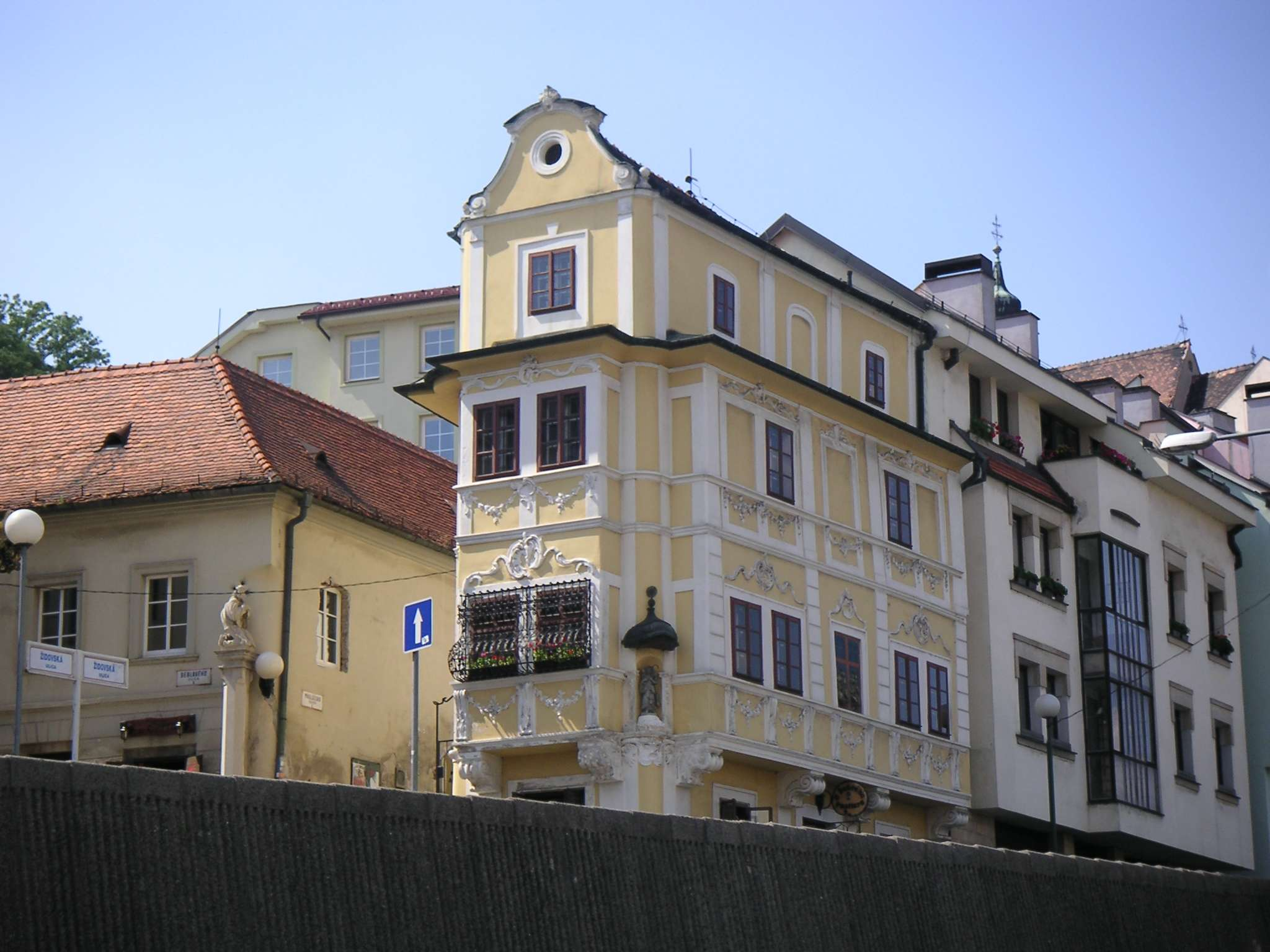
House of the Good Shepherd, home to the Museum of Clocks

Bratislava is the capital city and the cultural and economic centre of Slovakia. It is home to several museums and galleries, including the Slovak National Museum and the Slovak National Gallery.

== Museums ==
=== Slovak National Museum ===
The Slovak National Museum (Slovenské národné múzeum) has its headquarters in Bratislava on Vajanského nábrežie (a riverfront street in the Old Town), along with the Natural Science Museum, which is one of its subdivisions.

The Slovak Museum was established in Bratislava in 1940 by merging the Slovak National Geographic and History Museum and the Agricultural Museum. In 1961 the Slovak National Museum in Martin was merged with the Slovak Museum, creating the new Slovak National Museum based in Bratislava. The SNM is the highest institution focusing on scientific research and cultural education in the field of museological activity in Slovakia. The SNM manages 16 specialized museums in and outside Bratislava.

The museums situated in Bratislava are:

- Natural Science Museum (Prírodovedné múzeum)
- Archaeological Museum (Archeologické múzeum)
- Museum of History (Historické múzeum) – in Bratislava Castle
- Museum of Jewish Culture (Múzeum židovskej kultúry)
- Museum of Hungarian Culture in Slovakia (Múzeum kultúry Maďarov na Slovensku)
- Museum of Carpathian German Culture (Múzeum kultúry karpatských Nemcov)
- Otis Laubert Museum (Múzeum Otisa Lauberta)

=== Bratislava City Museum ===
The Bratislava City Museum (Múzeum mesta Bratislavy) established in 1868 is the oldest museum in continuous operation in Slovakia. The museum's primary goal is to chronicle Bratislava's history in various forms from the earliest periods using historical and archaeological collections. The museum offers nine permanent displays in eight specialized museums, mainly situated in the Old Town. The Museum of the City History situated in the Old Town Hall documents Bratislava's history from the mediaeval period to the 20th century. The Museum of Arms is located on Michael's (Michalská) Street at Michael's Gate. The museum focuses on Bratislava's history and developments in firearms, gunsmithing, metalworking, and town fortifications. The building also offers a view over the historical centre and its surroundings. The Museum of Clocks is situated on Jewish (Židovská) Street below Bratislava Castle, in the Rococo-style "House of the Good Shepherd", built from 1760 to 1765. The museum exhibits antique clocks from the end of 17th to the end of the 19th century, mainly from Bratislava's clockmakers. Other displays include the Devín Castle and ancient Gerulata.

=== Other museums ===
The Bratislava Transport Museum, a branch of the Slovak Technical Museum in Košice, is situated on the site of the first steam-railway station in Bratislava on Šancová Street, near the current main railway station. It was opened on June 24, 1999.

The Water Museum (Vodárenské múzeum), which is administered by the Bratislava Water Company (Bratislavská vodárenská spoločnosť), is located in Karlova Ves. It focuses on history of waterworks and water supply in Bratislava, exhibiting tools, machines and photographs.

The Museum of Education and Pedagogy was established in 1970 by the Department of Education and is administered by the Institute of Information and Prognoses of Education (Ústav informácií a prognóz školstva). The museum contains almost 40,000 exhibits from the 16th to the 20th century.

== Galleries ==
=== Slovak National Gallery ===
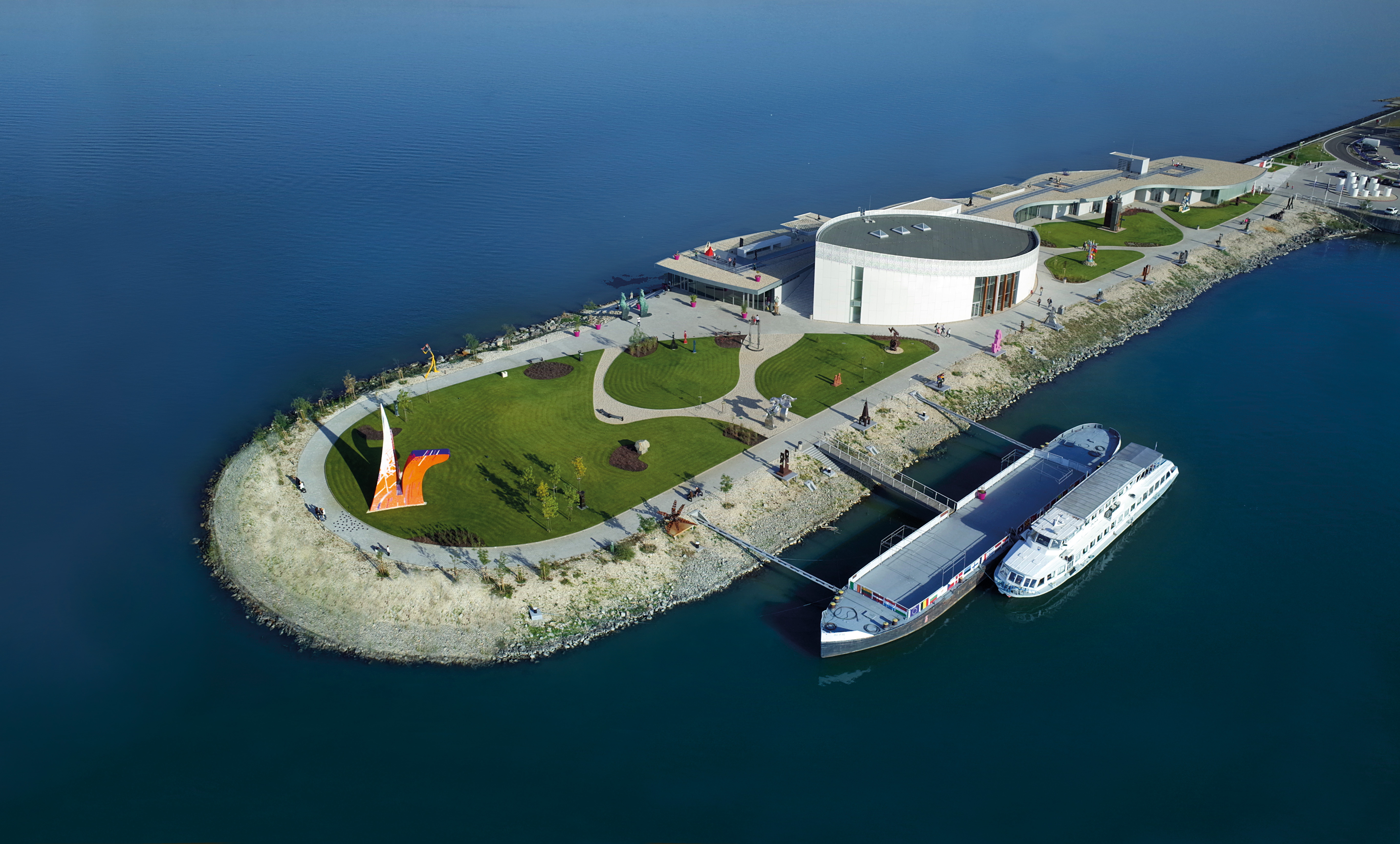
Danubiana Art Museum at the Čunovo waterworks

The Slovak National Gallery (abbr. SNG), founded in 1948, is the biggest network of galleries in Slovakia. Two displays in Bratislava are situated in Esterházy Palace (Esterházyho palác) and the Water Barracks (Vodné kasárne), adjacent one to another. They are located on the Danube riverfront in the Old Town.

=== Other galleries ===
The Bratislava City Gallery, founded in 1961, is the second biggest Slovak gallery of its kind. It stores about 35,000 pieces of Slovak and international art and offers permanent displays in Pálffy Palace and Mirbach Palace, located in the Old Town. Danubiana Art Museum, one of the youngest art museums in Europe, is situated near Čunovo waterworks (part of Gabčíkovo Waterworks). It opened on September 9, 2000. Gallery Enter, near the Bratislava City Gallery, is host to new digital media art.

== See also ==
- List of museums in Slovakia
