= Jezuitský kostol =

Jezuitský kostol may refer to:

- Jesuit Church, Bratislava
- Premonstratensian Church (Košice)
