= Miestodržiteľský palác =

Palace in Bratislava, Slovakia

- Miestodržiteľský palác
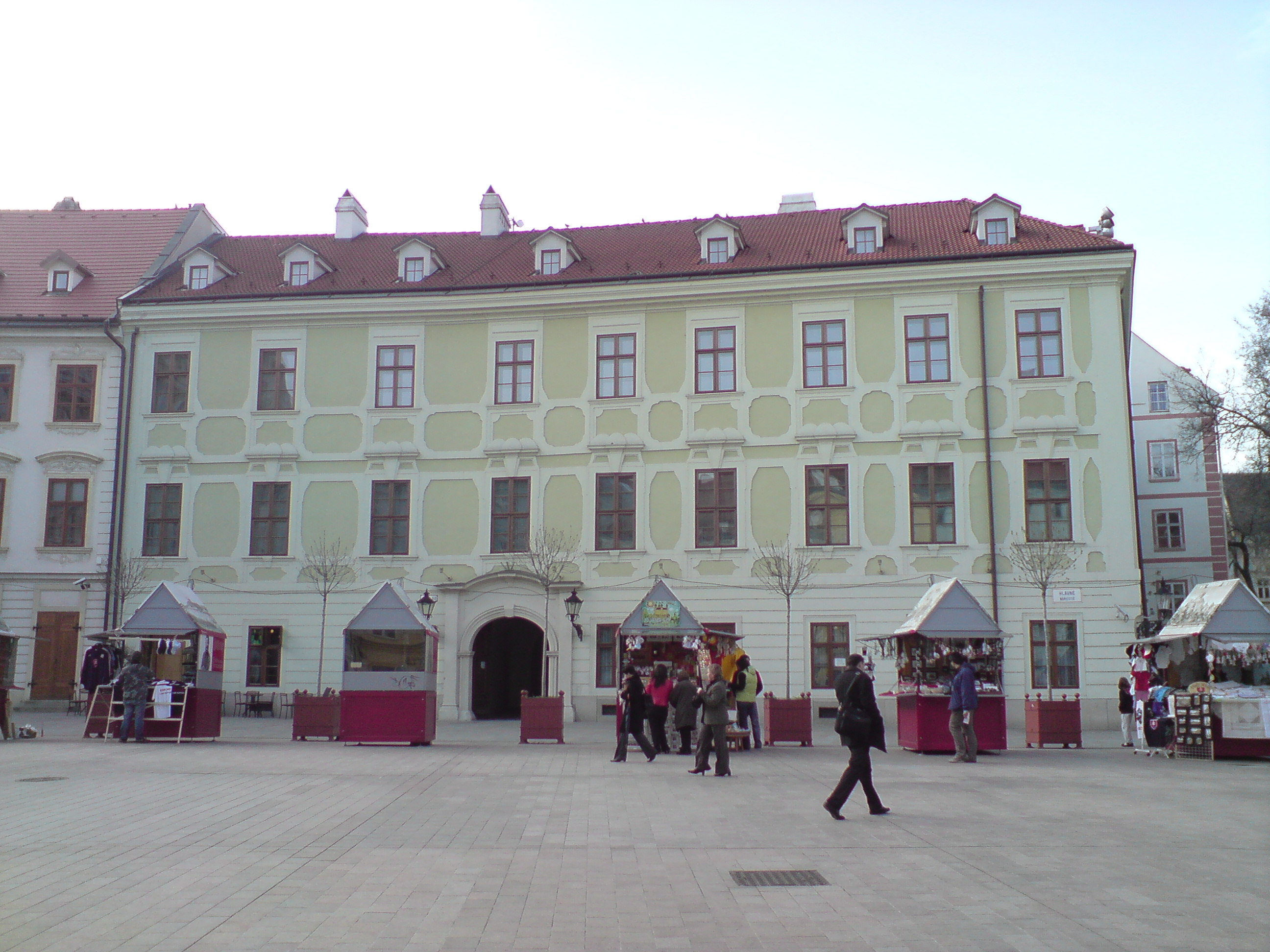

General information
- Type: Palace
- Location: Old Town, Bratislava
- Country: Slovakia
- Coordinates: 48.1437°N 17.1080°E

Miestodržiteľský palác (Vice Governor's palace in Bratislava) is an old and historically important building, located in Bratislava, the capital of Slovakia, in the Main Square, Old Town.

It was owned by the city of Bratislava until it was bought by the state in the 18th century for the purpose of housing The Vice Governor's Council. After World War II, the building was used by many institutions, until the Velvet Revolution in 1989.

Currently, it is owned by The Slovak Republic Government office and serves as one of many buildings used to host special events.
