= Apponyi Palace =

Monument in Bratislava

- Aponiho palác
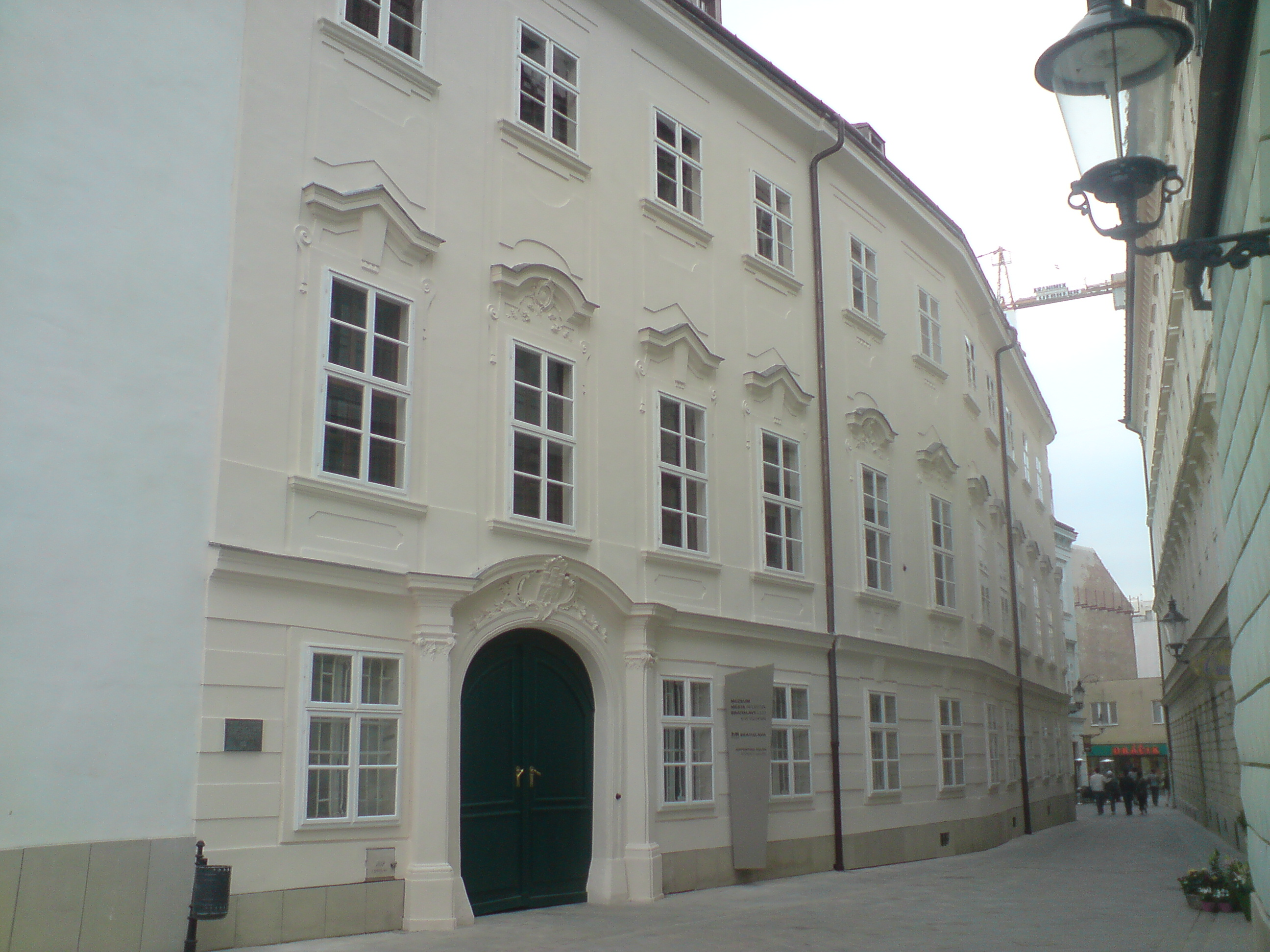

General information
- Type: Palace
- Location: Old Town, Bratislava
- Country: Slovakia
- Coordinates: 48.1434°N 17.1091°E

Apponyi Palace is a prominent monument in Bratislava, Slovakia, adjacent to the Old Town Hall. Its address is Radničná 577/1.

== History ==
The Apponyi Palace was built in 1761–1762 by Count György Apponyi, a member of the ancient Apponyi family and advisor to the King of Hungary, in place of two older townhouses. It was acquired in 1867 from the Apponyis by the Bratislava municipality, which subsequently added its arms on the cartouche above the street doorway. Two of its original four wings were demolished in 1910–1912 for the construction of a new municipal building. It was comprehensively renovated between 2003 and 2007.

== Description ==
The ground floor was both residential and used for storage. The first floor is the representative piano nobile with preserved rococo-classical interior decorations. The second floor was used as private quarters by the Apponyi family, with less high ceilings and less elaborate decorations. The attic was used for accommodation from the 18th century until the first half of the 19th century (it was common for visitors to coronations and other major events to sleep in the attics of townhouses and palaces of the noble). Today, the wooden booths for sleeping have been removed.

The palace now houses two museums, the Museum of Viticulture in the basement, and the Period Rooms Museum upstairs.

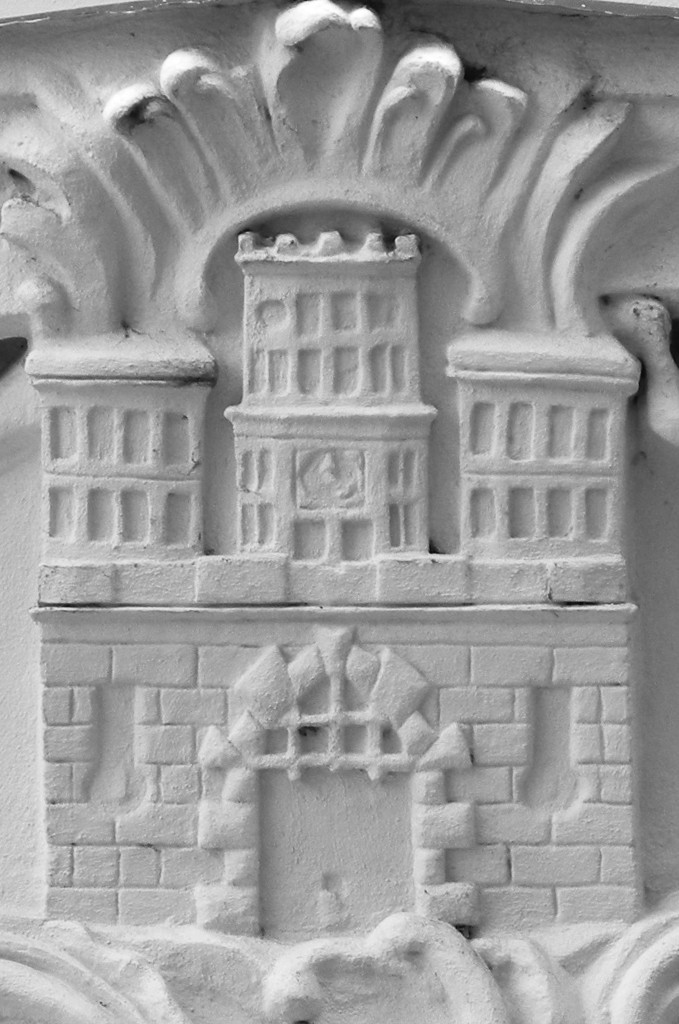
Municipal coat of arms above the entrance

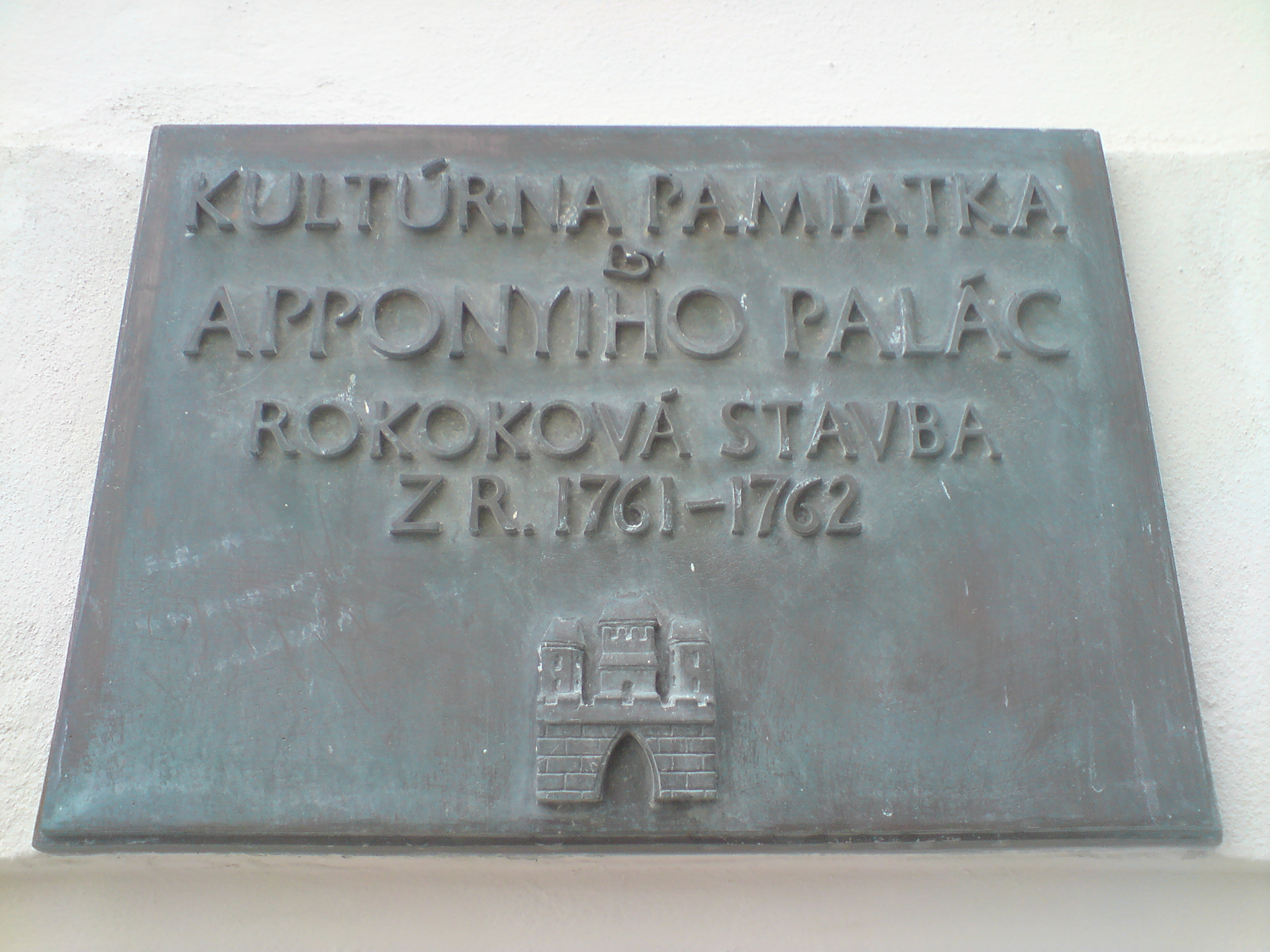
Plaque on the street facade

== See also ==
- Old Town Hall (Bratislava)
