= Bratislava City Gallery =

Coordinates: 48.14478°N 17.10785°E

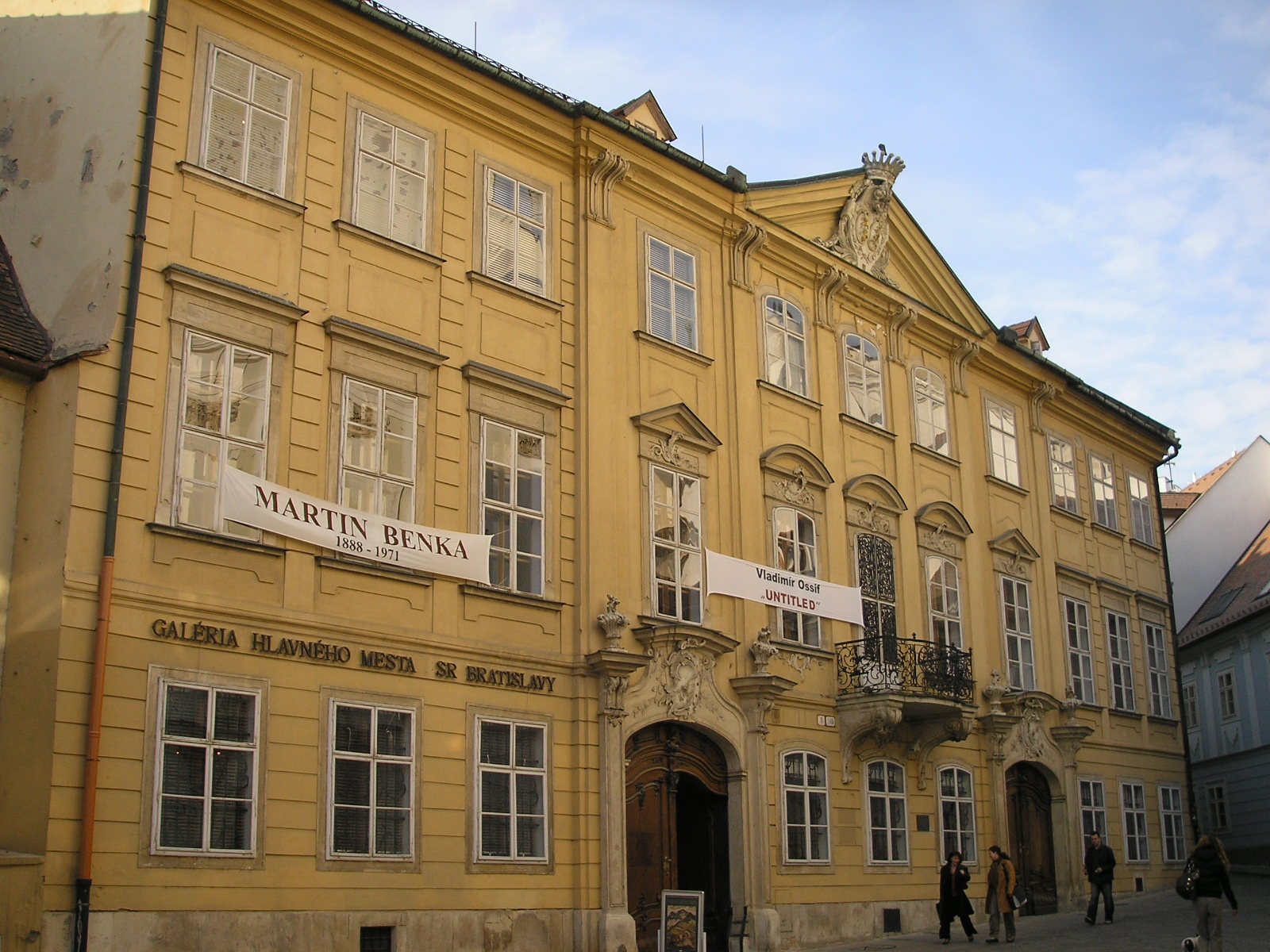
Mirbach Palace, seat of the Bratislava City Gallery

The Bratislava City Gallery (Slovak: Galéria mesta Bratislava, abbr. GMB) is a gallery located in Bratislava, Slovakia, in the Old Town. It is the second largest Slovak gallery of its kind. The gallery is housed at the Mirbach Palace (Mirbachov palác) and Pálffy Palace (Pálffyho palác).

The gallery was founded in 1961, although the first attempts to collect works of arts began in the 19th century, when the Bratislava City Museum was established. It currently contains approximately 35,000 works of art.
