= Bratislava City Museum =

Museum in Bratislava, Slovakia

Coordinates: 48°08′38″N 17°06′32″E

- Múzeum mesta Bratislavy
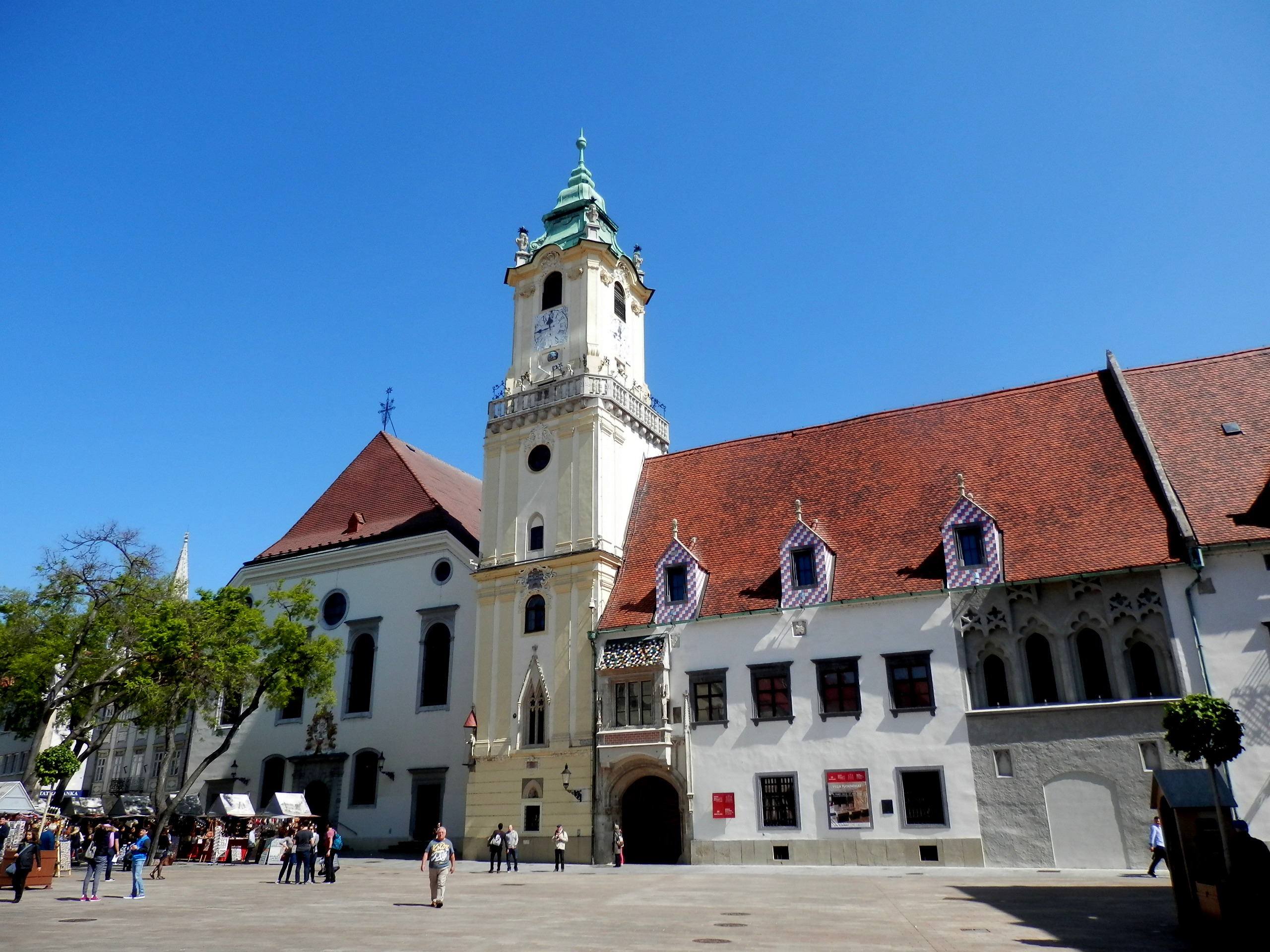
- Bratislava City Museum
- Established: 1868
- Location: Old Town Hall, Bratislava, Slovakia

The Bratislava City Museum (Slovak: Múzeum mesta Bratislavy, abbr. MMB) is a museum in Bratislava, Slovakia, established in 1868. Its headquarters are located in the Old Town, near the Main Square at the Old Town Hall. The museum is owned by one of the 11 allowance organizations of the City of Bratislava.

The museum documents the history of Bratislava from the earliest periods until the 20th century. The Bratislava City Museum is the oldest museum in continuous operation in Slovakia.

== History ==
The museum was first founded in 1864 when Bratislava was a part of Austria-Hungary and known as Pressburg. It was created by the Bratislava (Pressburg) Beautification Society at the behest of Jozef Könyöki, a local professor whom wished to take advantage of contemporary public interest in history. The Maoyr of Pressburg also supported the museum and granted it exhibition space in the Old Town Hall, where it remains. Following the end of the Second World War and Bratislava falling under communist Czechoslovakia, the museum was forced to promote Soviet ideology and a number of museum employees were removed as a result. In 1976, the museum opened an extension to their exhibition space with a Rococo house, called The Good Shepherd's House, being bought and transformed into an exhibition space for historical clocks. Following the fall of communism and establishment of Slovakia, the Old Town Hall was renovated to allow the museum to use previously inaccesable areas as public exhibition spaces.

== Displays ==
The Bratislava City Museum manages eight specialized museums with nine permanent displays throughout the city:

- Museum of the City History: main museum, which displays archaeological discoveries and findings and documents a history of pharmacy, culture, social life and numismatics
- Museum of Arms and City Fortifications in the tower above Michael's Gate
- Museum of Clocks, housed at the House of the Good Shepherd
- Johann Nepomuk Hummel museum
- Arthur Fleischmann museum
- Janko Jesenský museum
- Devín Castle National Cultural Monument in Devín
- Gerulata National Cultural Monument in Rusovce.

== See also ==
- Museums and galleries of Bratislava
