= Peace of Pressburg =

Peace of Pressburg or Treaty of Pressburg may refer to:

- Peace of Pressburg (1271), a treaty settling territorial claims between Bohemia and Hungary
- Peace of Pressburg (1491), between Hungary and the Holy Roman Empire over Lower Austria and the Hungarian succession
- Peace of Pressburg (1626), between Gabriel Bethlen of Transylvania, the leader of an uprising against the Habsburg Monarchy, and Ferdinand II, Holy Roman Emperor
- Peace of Pressburg (1805), between France and Austria, ending the War of the Third Coalition and marking the effective end of the Holy Roman Empire

== See also ==
- List of treaties
