= Old Town Hall (Bratislava) =

- Stará radnica
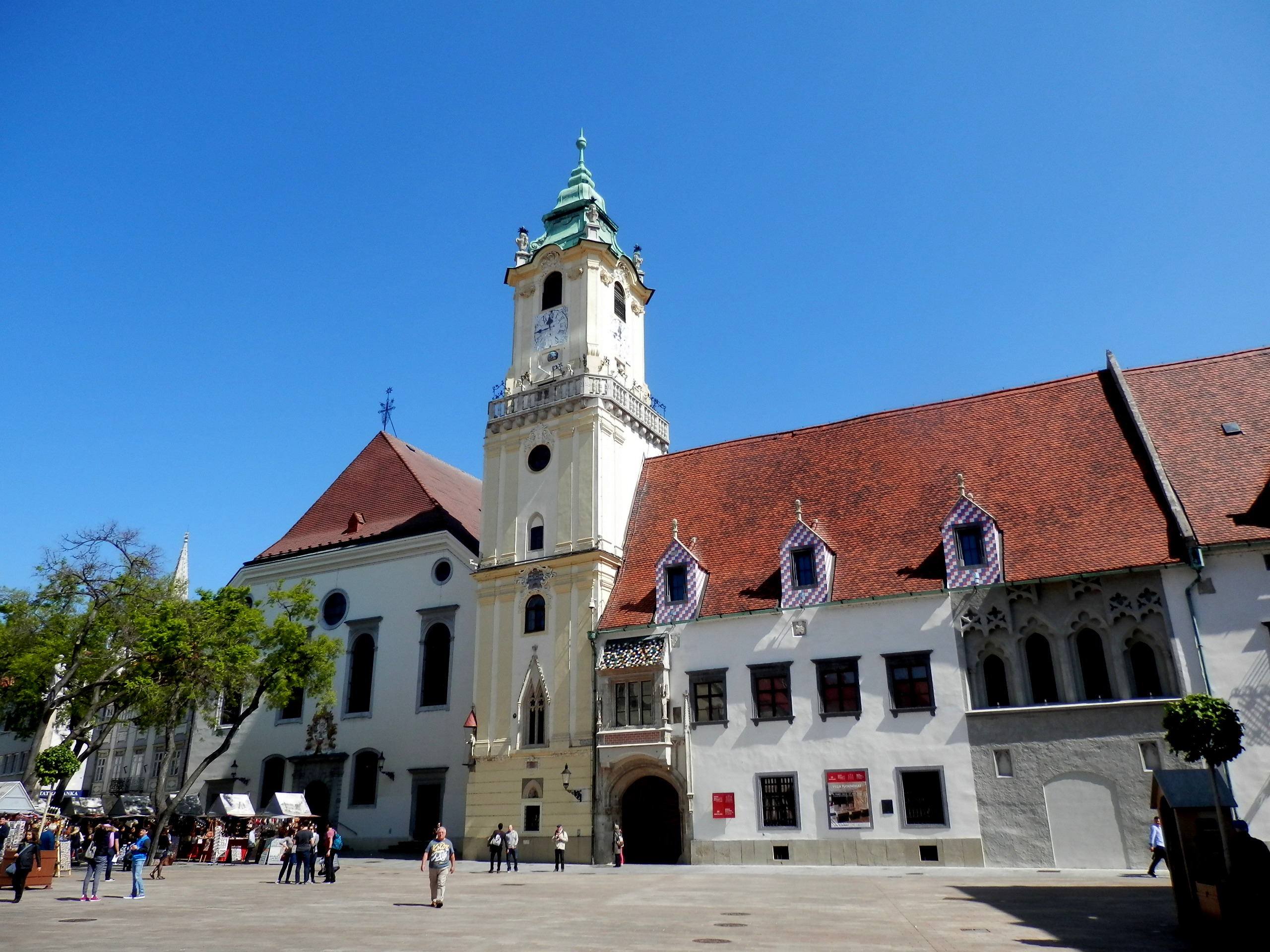
- Old Town Hall in Bratislava, Slovakia
- Interactive map of the Old Town Hall area
- Former names: Régi városháza

General information
- Type: Town hall
- Architectural style: originally Gothic, now baroque, neo-Renaissance and neo-Gothic
- Location: Main square, Bratislava, Slovakia
- Current tenants: Museum
- Construction started: 13th century
- Completed: 1599
- Renovated: 18th century, 20th century

Old Town Hall (Slovak: Stará radnica, Hungarian: Régi városháza) is a complex of buildings from the 14th century in the Old Town of Bratislava, the capital of Slovakia. It is the oldest city hall in the country and it is one of the oldest stone buildings still standing in Bratislava, with the tower being built approximately in 1370. The town hall was created in the 15th century by connecting three townhouses, and then went through several reconstructions in the course of the centuries.

It houses the oldest museum in Bratislava, the Bratislava City Museum, founded in 1868, featuring an exhibit of the city history and an exhibit of torture devices. The outlook from the top of the Old Town Hall tower offers a round view of Bratislava Old Town and its environs.

== Location ==
The Old Town Hall is located in the heart of the Bratislava, between the Main Square and the Primate's square at: 48°08′38.0″N 17°06′32.8″E. It is next to the Jesuit Church and near the Greek and Japanese embassies. It is easily recognizable by its colorful tiled roof.

== History ==
Finished in the Gothic style in the 15th century, it resulted from the joining several buildings: Jacobus' house with a tower, Pawer's house, Unger's house and the Apponyi palace (Slovak: Pawerov dom, Ungerov dom, Aponyiho palác, Hungarian: Pawer ház, Unger ház, Apponyi palota). The principal building adjacent to the tower and facing the Main Square was built by the town Mayor Jacobus II (also called Jakab, Jakub) in the 14th century, while the tower (originally Gothic) was erected in the late 13th century. Towers made of stone were part of some medieval townhouses in order to provide safety in case of war or protection of wealth in case of fire. Although exact date cannot be specified, details of the gothic windows suggest it was built approximately in 1370. The tower's ground floor was one meter lower than today's street level. The tower was reinforced and modified several times over the next centuries; at one point it contained mechanical clock, a large sphere depicting the current phases of the moon and above that there were bells. During the Napoleonic Wars, a significant historical event centered on Bratislava (then known as Pressburg) following the breakdown of the Peace of Pressburg, which had been signed between Austria and France in 1805 after the Battle of Austerlitz. Four years later, Napoleon re-declared war, leading to a notable siege of the city. French forces bombarded the area across the Danube River; while many cannonballs targeted the current suburbs of Petržalka, some struck the Old Town district adjacent to the river. One such cannonball became lodged in the foundation of the Old Town Hall, where it remains publicly visible today. The embedded cannonball serves as a tangible and poignant historical artifact, commemorating the city's experience during the conflict.

The Apponyi Palace was built by Count György Apponyi, a Hungarian nobleman and King's advisor, in place of two older townhouses in 1761–1762. The architect is unknown but older literature attributes the project to F. A. Hildebrandt. Only two wings survive from this residential representative town residence - western and the short southern. The ground floor was both residential and used for storage. The staircase included baroque stone sculptures of saints until the 1930s. First floor is the representative piano nobile with preserved rococo-classical interior decorations. Second floor was used for the accommodation of the Apponyi family, ceilings are lower here and wall decorations are less elaborate. The attic was used for accommodation from the 18th century until the first half of the 19th century (it was common for visitors to coronations and other major events to sleep in the attics of townhouses and palaces of the noble), today, the wooden booths for sleeping were removed. Until the second half of the 19th century the palace used to have another two wings around a trapezoid-shaped courtyard, used by the servants.

Later, the Old Town Hall underwent many transformations and enhancements, namely a Renaissance style reconstruction in 1599 following earthquake damage, Baroque restyling to the tower after a fire in the 18th century, and the addition of a Neo-Renaissance/Neo-Gothic wing built in 1912.

=== Use ===
The building was used as a town hall from the 15th century through the late 19th century. At times during that period, however, it also served other purposes, including housing a prison and mint, and being place of trade and celebrations. It was also used as the city's arsenal depository and municipal archive.

Today it hosts the Bratislava City Museum, displaying exhibitions of Pressburg's history. Exhibited items include torture instruments, the old town dungeons, antique weapons and armour, paintings and miniatures. One of its curiosities is a cannonball embedded in the tower wall, shot by Napoleon's soldiers in 1809 during bombardment of the city from Petržalka. During the summer its courtyard hosts concerts. The attic of the Apponyi Palace is used as a Study Depository of Glass and Ceramics.

The top of the tower is accessible as part of the Bratislava City Museum exhibition.

North-West	South-West	South-East	North-East

It offers a view of the Old Town of the city.

== Current state ==
Despite some reconstruction efforts, the structure is in need of renovating some outside parts.

== See also ==
- Bratislava City Museum
- Mayor of Bratislava

== Gallery ==
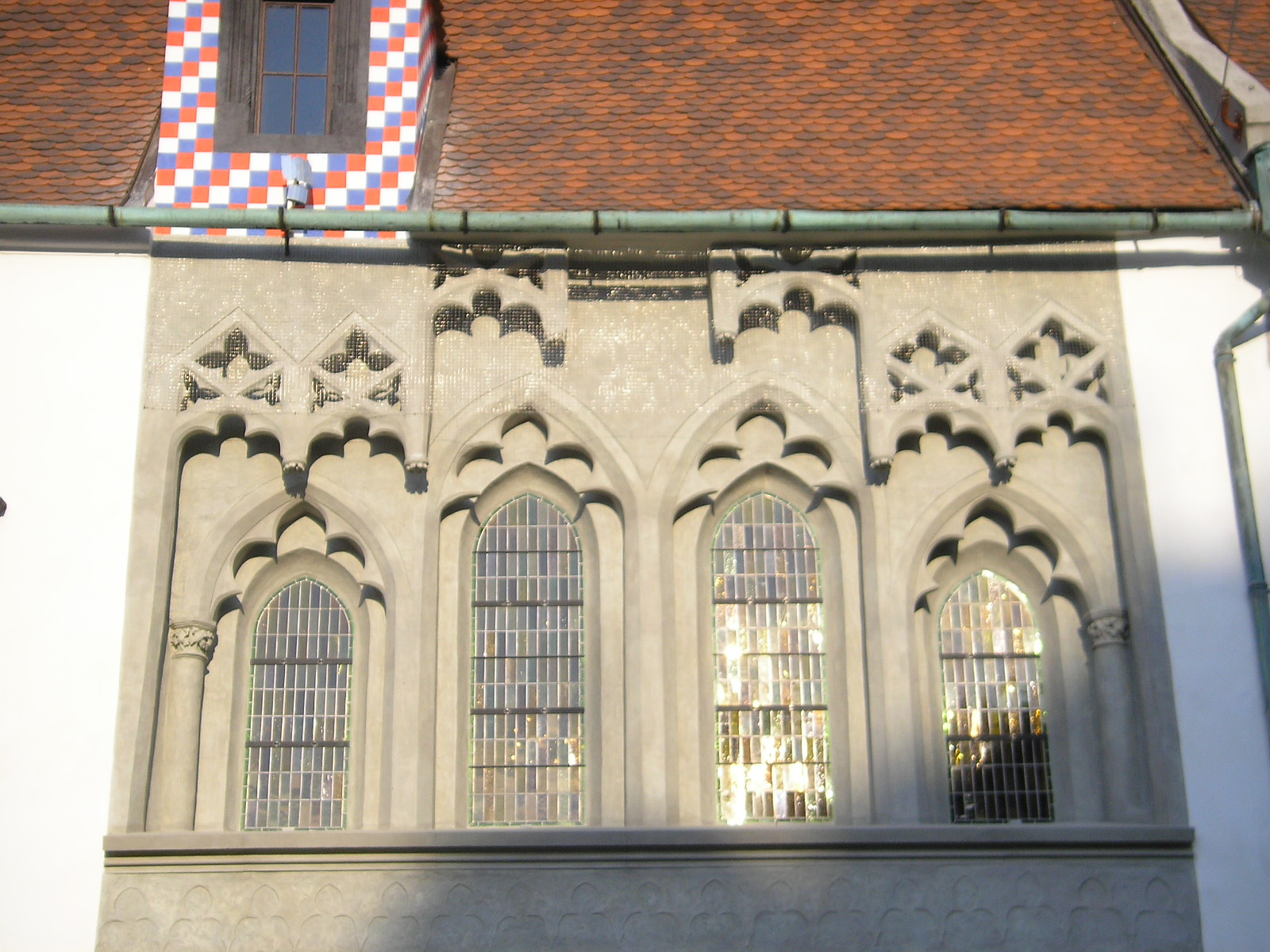
Detail of the building

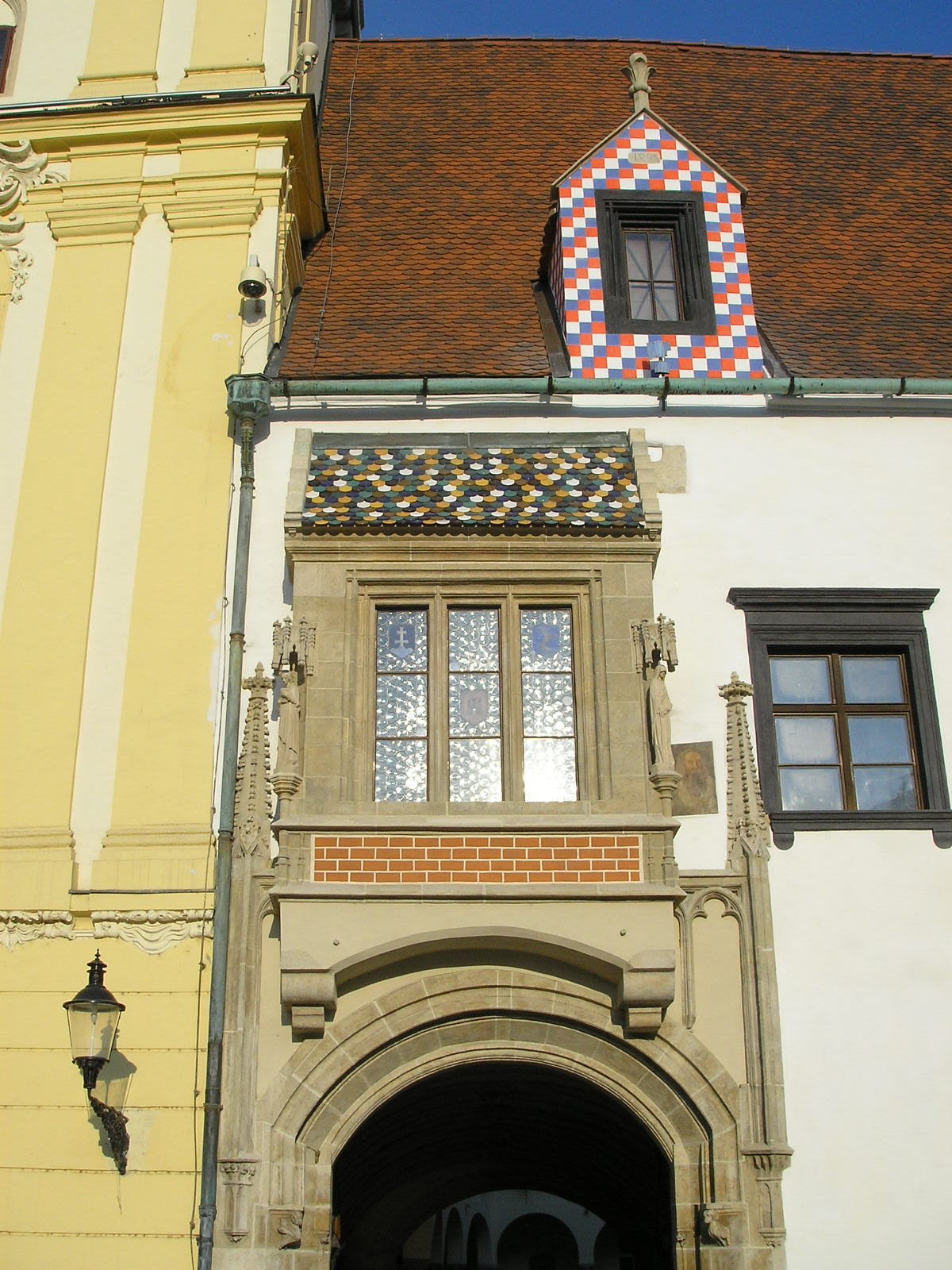
Detail of the building

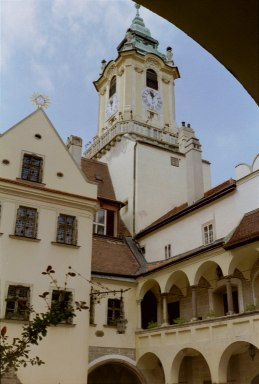
View from the courtyard

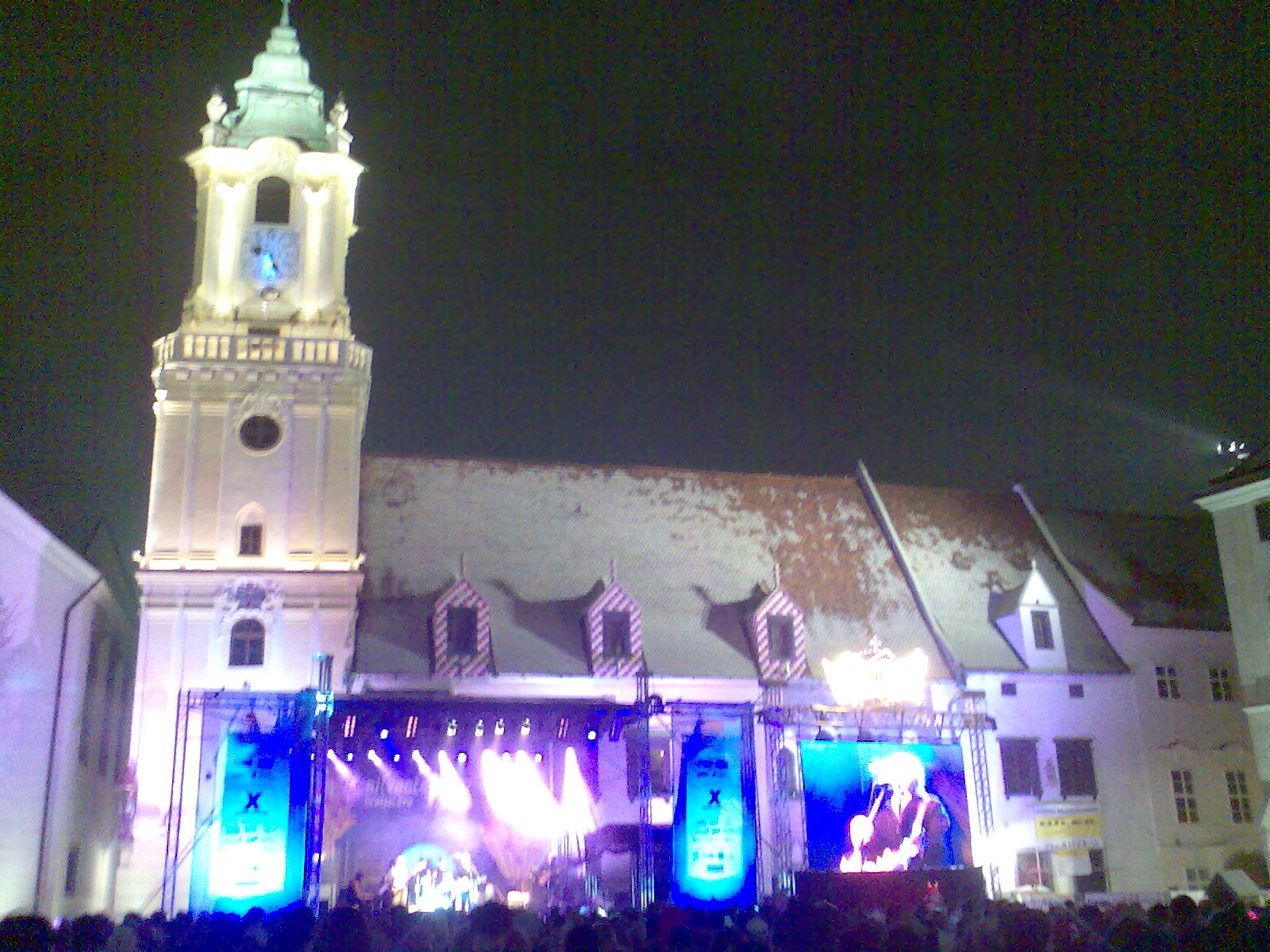
Concert in front of the Old Town Hall
