= Gerulata =

Roman military camp in Rusovce, Bratislava, Slovakia

Coordinates: 48°03′22″N 17°08′59″E

Gerulata (Kastell Rusovce)
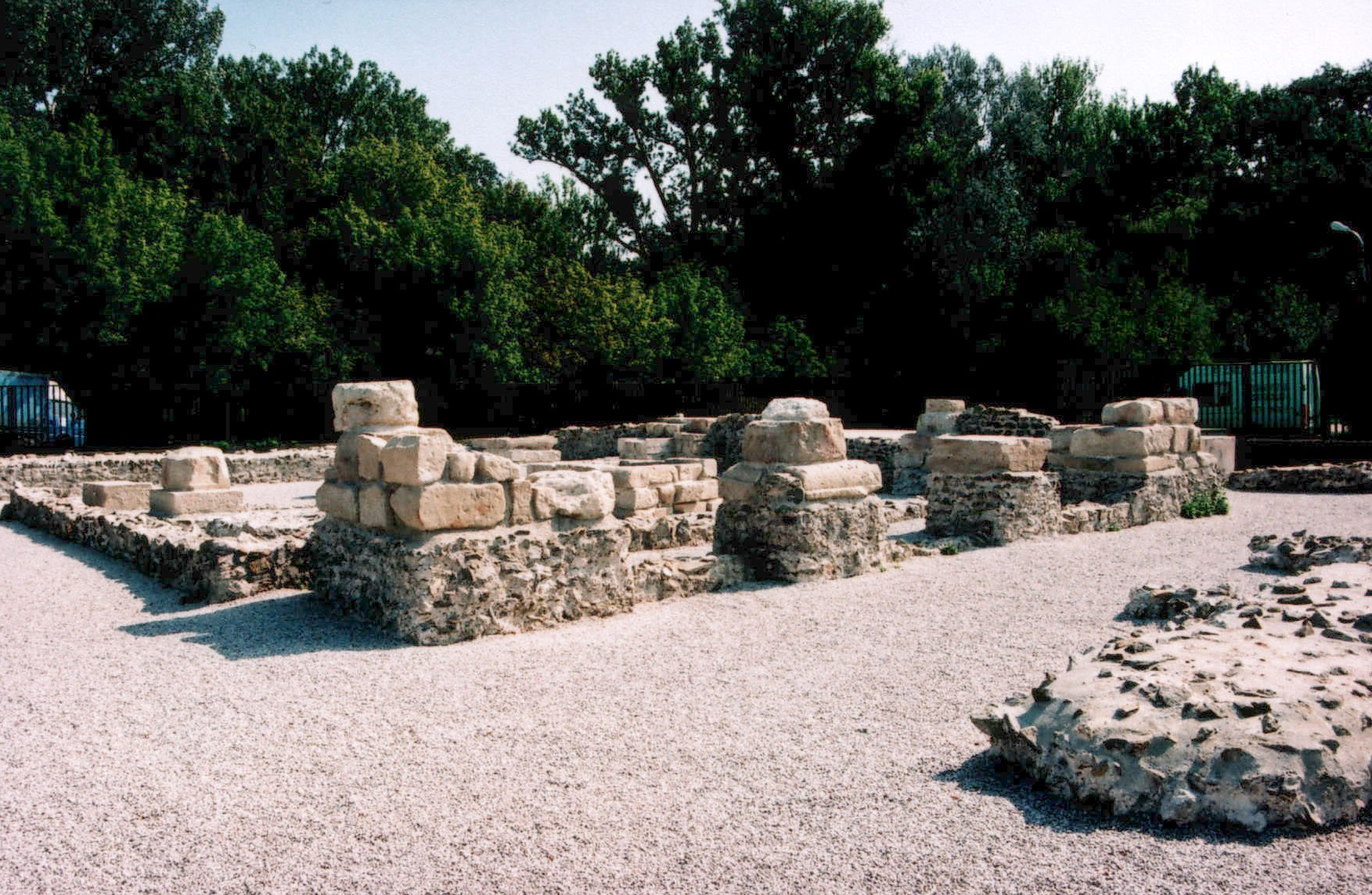
- Gerulata
- Alternative name: Gerulata, Gerulate
- Limes: Upper Pannonia
- Section: Section 2
- Date(s) occupied: 1st to 4th century AD
- Type: Cohort and Ala fort, square fort with rounded corners surrounded by a double ditch (Spitzgraben), Burgus of Late Antiquity
- Unit/Formation: a) legio XV, b) cohors V Callaecorum Lucensium (?), c) ala I Canennefatum, d) equites Sagittarii
- Size: a) wood and earth fort, width: 113 m b) stone fort I, width: 133–166 m, c) burgus: 39 × 30 m
- Construction: a) wood and earth design b) stone design
- Condition: Nothing visible above ground, Foundation walls of the burgus were conserved and made accessible in a visitors' area
- Location: Rusovce
- Height: 130 m
- Previous fort: Kleinkastell Stopfenreuth (northwest)
- Following fort: Kastell Ad Flexum (Mosonmagyaróvár) (southeast)

Gerulata was a Roman military camp located near today's Rusovce, a borough of Bratislava, Slovakia. It was part of the Roman province of Pannonia and was built in the 2nd century as a part of the frontier defence system. It was abandoned in the 4th century, when Roman legions withdrew from Pannonia.

Today there is a museum, which is part of the Bratislava City Museum.

Archaeologists have unearthed its remnants and their discoveries are on exhibition in the hall of the museum, which is open in summer and can be found behind the Catholic Church of St Mary Magdalene in the town. Beyond the remains of the Roman forum, fragments of structures and gravestones, bronze, iron, ceramic and stone pieces are on show in a museum showing daily life.

The best preserved object is a quadrilateral building 30 metres long and 30 metres wide, with 2.4 metre thick walls.

In July 2021, Gerulata was added to the UNESCO's World Heritage List as part of the Western segment of the Danubian Limes of the Roman Empire.

== Bibliography ==
- Kuzmová, Klára; Rajtár, Ján (eds) (1996). Gerulata I. Nitra: Archeologický ústav Akademie věd SK.
- Varsik, Vladimir (1998). "Das Römische Lager von Rusovce-Gerulata. Ein Beitrag zu Lokalisierung und Anfängen." Jahrbuch des Römisch-Germanischen Zentralmuseum Mainz 43, pp. 531–589.
