= Jesuit Church, Bratislava =

Coordinates: 48°08′38″N 17°06′31″E

Holy Saviour Church
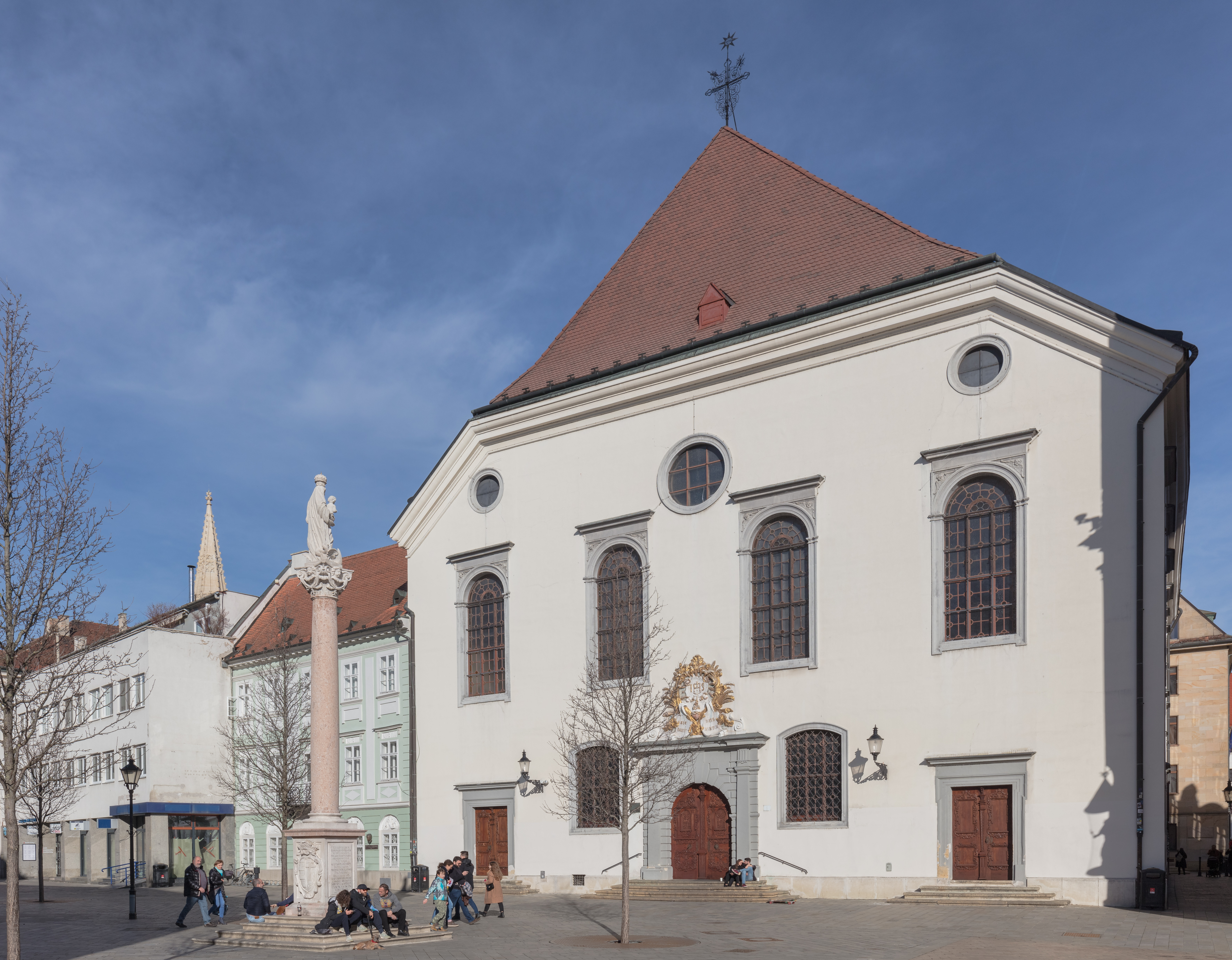
- Main entrance on Františkánske nám
- Holy Saviour Church
- Location: Kostol Najsvätejšieho Spasiteľa, Františkánske nám. 4, 814 99, Bratislava
- Country: Slovakia
- Denomination: Roman Catholic Church

History
- Dedication: Society of Jesus

Architecture
- Years built: 1636 - 1638

Administration
- Parish: St. Martin's, central Bratislava (informal)

The Holy Saviour Church (Slovak: Kostol Najsvätejšieho Spasiteľa, also called Jezuitský kostol, or the Jesuit Church, is a church building constructed in the 17th century on Františkánske nám in the Old Town of Bratislava, Slovakia. It was originally built to serve as a protestant house of worship. Today the church belongs to the Society of Jesus, known as the Jesuit Order.

== Location ==
It is located immediately north of Bratislava's Old Town Hall, at the edge of the city's principal square, Hlavné námestie.

== History ==
The church was built from 1636 to 1638 as a place of worship for the city's growing community of German protestants. By royal decree the church could not resemble a Roman-Catholic house of worship in any way; so it was built without a spire and with nothing at its entrance or on its facade to suggest the building's function.

== Organ (Rieger 1924, opus 2273) ==
I Hauptwerk C–f3
Bourdon	16′
Principal	8′
Gamba	8′
Harmonieflöte	8′
Gedackt	8'
Octave	4′
Flöte	4′
Quinte	2^{2}/_{3}′
Superoctave	2′
Kornett III-V	2^{2}/_{3}′
Mixtur IV	2′
Trompete	8′
Tremolo

II Schwellwerk C–f3
Rohrflöte	8′
Geigenprincipal	8′
Salicional	8′
Quintadena	8′
Octave	4′
Lieblich Gedackt	4′
Weitquinte	2^{2}/_{3}′
Flageolett	2′
Quinta minor	1^{1}/_{3}′
Sedecima	1′
Mixtur VI	1′
Klarinette	8′ (durchschlagend)
Tremolo

III Schwellwerk C–f3
Quintadena	16′
Principal	8′
Spitzgambe	8′
Portunalflöte	8′
Octave	4′
Spitzflöte	4′
Nasard	2^{2}/_{3}′
Nachthorn	2′
Terz	1^{3}/_{5}′
Cymbel III	1′
Mixtur III-V	2′
Trompette harmonique	8′
Oboe	8′
Clairon	4′

Pedal C–f1
Principal	16′
Violon	16′
Subbass	16′
Quintgedackt	5^{1}/_{3}′
Cello	8′
Octavbaß	8′
Choralflöte	8′
Posaune	16′
Basstrompete	8′
Clairon	4′

- fully pneumatic action
- Couplers:
  - III/II, III/I, II/I, III/P, II/P, I/P
  - Super-octave couplers: Super III, Super III/II, Super III/I, Super III/P, Super II, Super II/I
  - Sub-octave couplers: Sub III, Sub III/I, Sub II/I
- 2 combinations, Crescendo, Tutti, reeds off

== See also ==
- History of Bratislava
- List of Jesuit sites
