= Mirbach Palace =

Palace in Bratislava, Slovakia

- Mirbachov palác
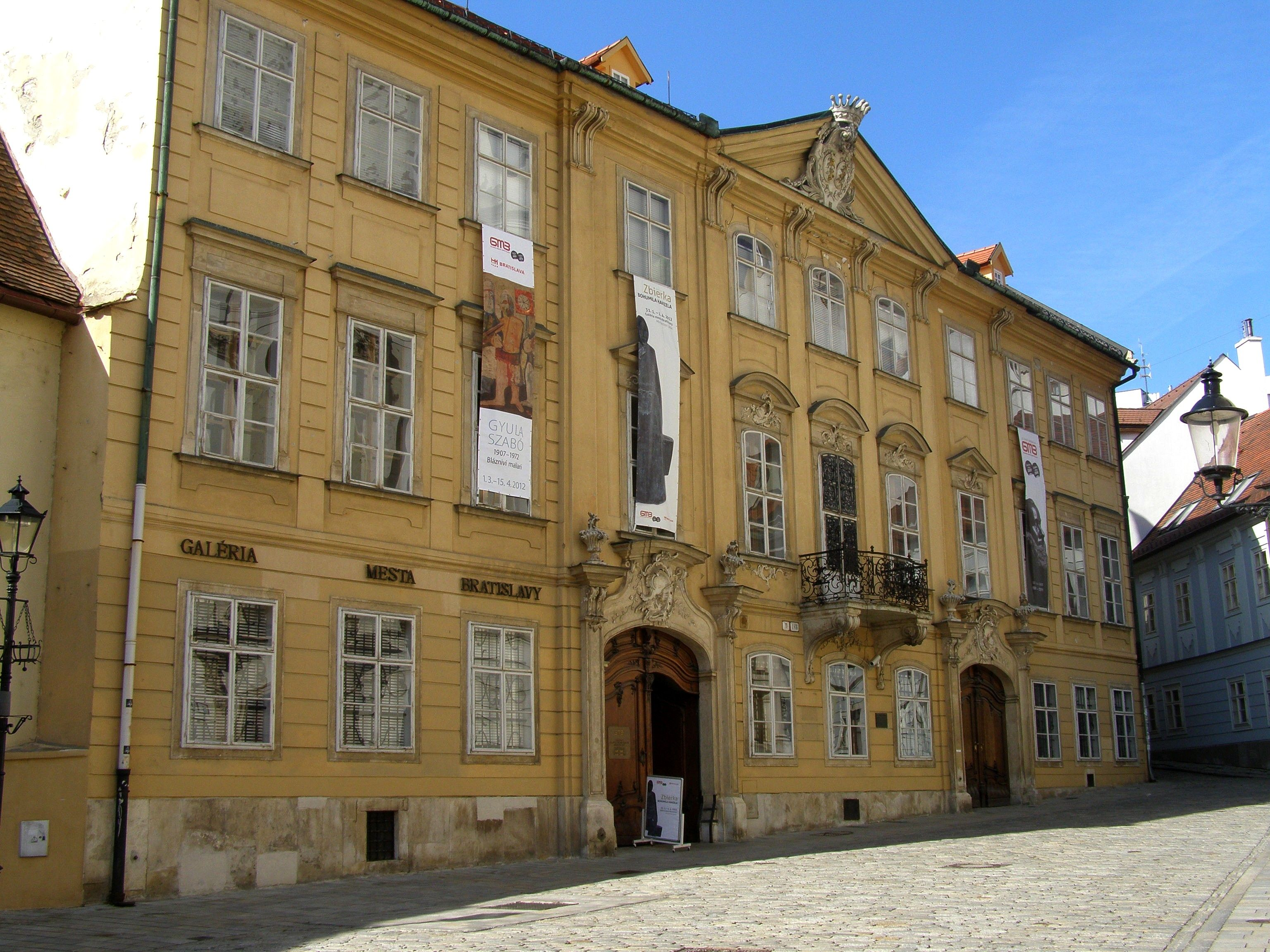

General information
- Type: Palace
- Architectural style: Baroque, Rococo
- Country: Slovakia
- Coordinates: 48.1448°N 17.1078°E

Mirbach Palace is a Baroque-Rococo building in the historical zone of Bratislava, Slovakia. The four-wing, two-story building, which ranks among the most beautiful and best-preserved architectural monuments of the mentioned style period in Slovakia, was named after the last owner, Baron Dr. Emil Mirbach.

== History of the palace and its owners ==
The history of the palace and the place where the current building stands goes back to the ancient past. The first historical document related to the building's predecessor is the cadastral record of the plot here, dating from 1379. The deed mentions the owner of the house on this plot, who was a certain Mikuláš Damankusch. There is a document from 1443 in which the said house is mentioned as "Weittenhof" (from German, wide yard). The well-known Bratislava historian Tivadar Ortvay (1843-1916) states in one of his writings that the building standing here was decorated with the city coat of arms, and its core consisted mostly of wooden construction. From the middle of the 17th to the beginning of the 18th century, in addition to the name "Weittenhof", the designation "domus civitatis" (i.e. "city house") is mentioned in the historical records, on the basis of which it can be assumed that the original object came into the property in the mentioned period towns.

Since its inception in the 14th century, the building has been owned by several owners of different social status. Among the most important of them was e.g. Chamber councilor Juraj Szombathely (lived in the house in 1621); in 1636 it was owned by the Illésházy family.

The construction of the house did not escape Matej Bel's attention either. In his famous Notes (from 1735) he describes it as follows: "Finally, the palace, which is popularly called Weiter-Hoff after its wide courtyard, is not to be missed. It belongs to the city according to a very old law. It is built on a wide area at the mouth of Zámočnícká Street (Germans call it Schlosser Gasse, Hungarians call it Lakatos-Utza). Where there is a view of the Franciscan church, the rooms are suitable for living. But because it is drawn to the other side in two wings, it does not lack beauty and comfort..."

Bel continues with a description of an event that significantly affected the fate of the building - on 23 October 1733, the house burned down. The obvious cause was the negligence of the theater company that rented the premises in the palace. In addition, we learn from Bel's description that the rooms in the palace were used several times, e.g. for the accommodation of military officers or that the basement spaces are used for wine storage.

In 1762, the house, or the remains of the house were bought by the Bratislava brewer Johann Michael Spech, who came from the former mayor's family in Podhrady. The well-known historian and cartographer Ján Matej Korabinský left a message about this fact in his work Beschreibung der königlich – ungarischen Haupt-, Frey – und Krönungstadt Pressburg (Description of the Hungarian royal, capital and coronation city of Prešpork) from 1781.

On 4 March 1768, Michael Spech obtained permission to build a new building on the site of a former building damaged by fire. To date, it has not been possible to identify the author of the project. Several experts pointed to the foreign origin of the designer; there was a reflection on the work of the prominent Austrian architect Franz Anton Hillebrandt. The construction work was led by master mason Matej Höllrigl (1728-1801), who came to Prešpork in 1755 and worked here as a town master. According to archival records, the construction lasted two years - from the spring of 1768 to the spring of 1770.

The result of the construction was a representative urban baroque palace with rich rococo stucco ornamental decoration of the facades and furnishing of the interior spaces, with a high standard of execution of artistic and craft works.

One of the original rooms of the palace with wooden panelling.

Soon after completion, Spech sold the palace. Its new owner was Count Imrich Csáky, who appears as the owner as early as 1813. In older literature, two plastic coats of arms placed in the tympanum on the facade were attributed to him. Only subsequent research showed that they belonged to one of the later owners of the building.

Over the next hundred years, the object changed its owner several times. Among the more famous was Adam Jurenák (1772-1837), a member of the city council. He is listed as the owner in 1828.

The last two private owners of the palace - Nyáryovci and Dr. Emil Mirbach. The Nyárys acquired the palace in 1908 in the person of Count Koloman Nyáry and his son Karol. The leading Hungarian count family originates from the village of Bedegh in the Tolnian capital. The aforementioned coats of arms in the tympanum belong to the Nyáry family. The family owned the palace for only eight years. On 30 March 1917, it was bought by Baron Dr. Emil Mirbach with his wife. The new owner was aware of the historical value of the palace as well as the value of the works of art with which the palace was furnished. Therefore, in his last will, he bequeathed it to the city with the request that the house be made available to the public as a fine arts museum.

The city took ownership of the palace in 1949, and the following year the first exhibitions of works of art were held there. In the following years, the palace underwent extensive monumental reconstruction, after which it was opened to the public in 1975. In April of the said year, it became the headquarters of the Municipal Gallery, which had been founded in the meantime.

Currently, the interior of the palace is structurally adapted to museum purposes; despite this, two rooms on the first floor with wooden paneling on the walls, in which rare period graphic sheets from the 18th century are installed, have been preserved in their original condition. In 1963, the Mirbach Palace was entered into the state list of cultural monuments. The palace has a permanent exhibition of Central European Baroque painting and sculpture, as well as spaces intended for short-term exhibitions.

== Description of the building ==
A four-winged, two-story palace with gable roofs built on an irregular trapezoid plan architecturally completes the space at the northern end of Františkánske Square. The palace wings surround the inner courtyard. Its dominant feature is a fountain with a copy of the sculpture Triton and a nymph, the work of the leading Bratislava sculptor Viktor Tilgner.

The main, strictly symmetrical facade, oriented towards Františkánské náměstí, is decorated with delicate, airy rockeries of imaginative shapes. In the middle of the facade leads a striking rizalite ending in a massive tympanum, on which there is a cartouche with a pair of oval shields under the count's crown. They form the coat of arms of the penultimate owners of the palace - the Ňário family.

== Resources ==
- Col. authors, 50 years of the Bratislava City Gallery 1961 - 2011, GMB, Bratislava, 2011 ISBN 978-80-89340-30-9
- J. Oršulová, Heraldic monuments of Bratislava, Albert Marenčin, Vydavateľstvo PT, Bratislava, 2007 ISBN 978-80-89218-64-6
- B. Bublincová, Št. Holčík, Bratislava fountains, Tatran, Bratislava, 1990 ISBN 80-222-0175-8
- L. Kemény, Bratislava Castle and Podhradie, Albert Marenčin, PT Publishing House, Bratislava, 2008 ISBN 978-80-89218-68-4

== Other projects ==
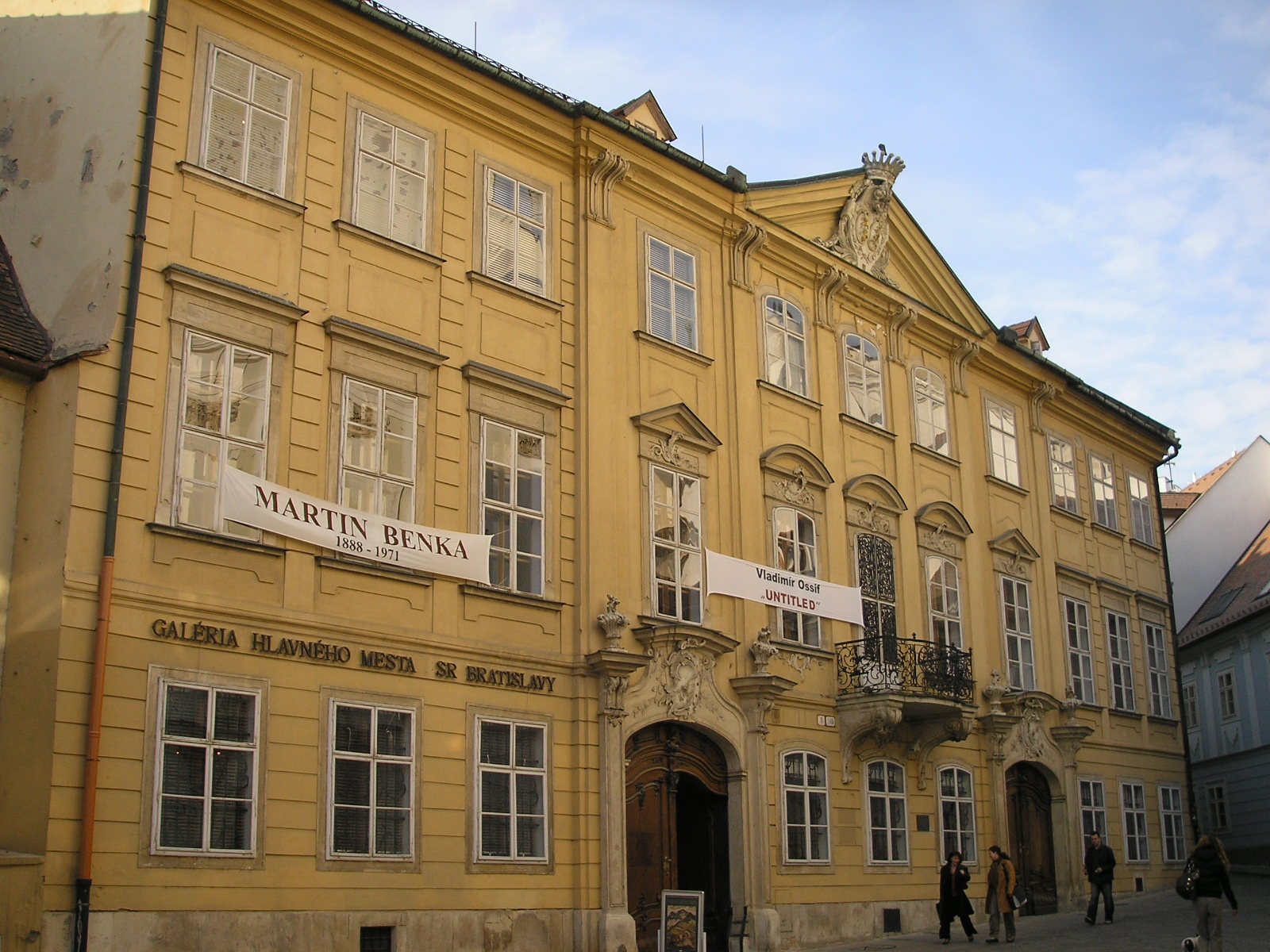
Mirbach Palace

Collaborate on Commons Commons offers multimedia files on the topic of the Mirbach Palace.
