= Hlavné námestie (Bratislava) =

Square in Bratislava, Slovakia

Coordinates: 48°08′36″N 17°06′30″E

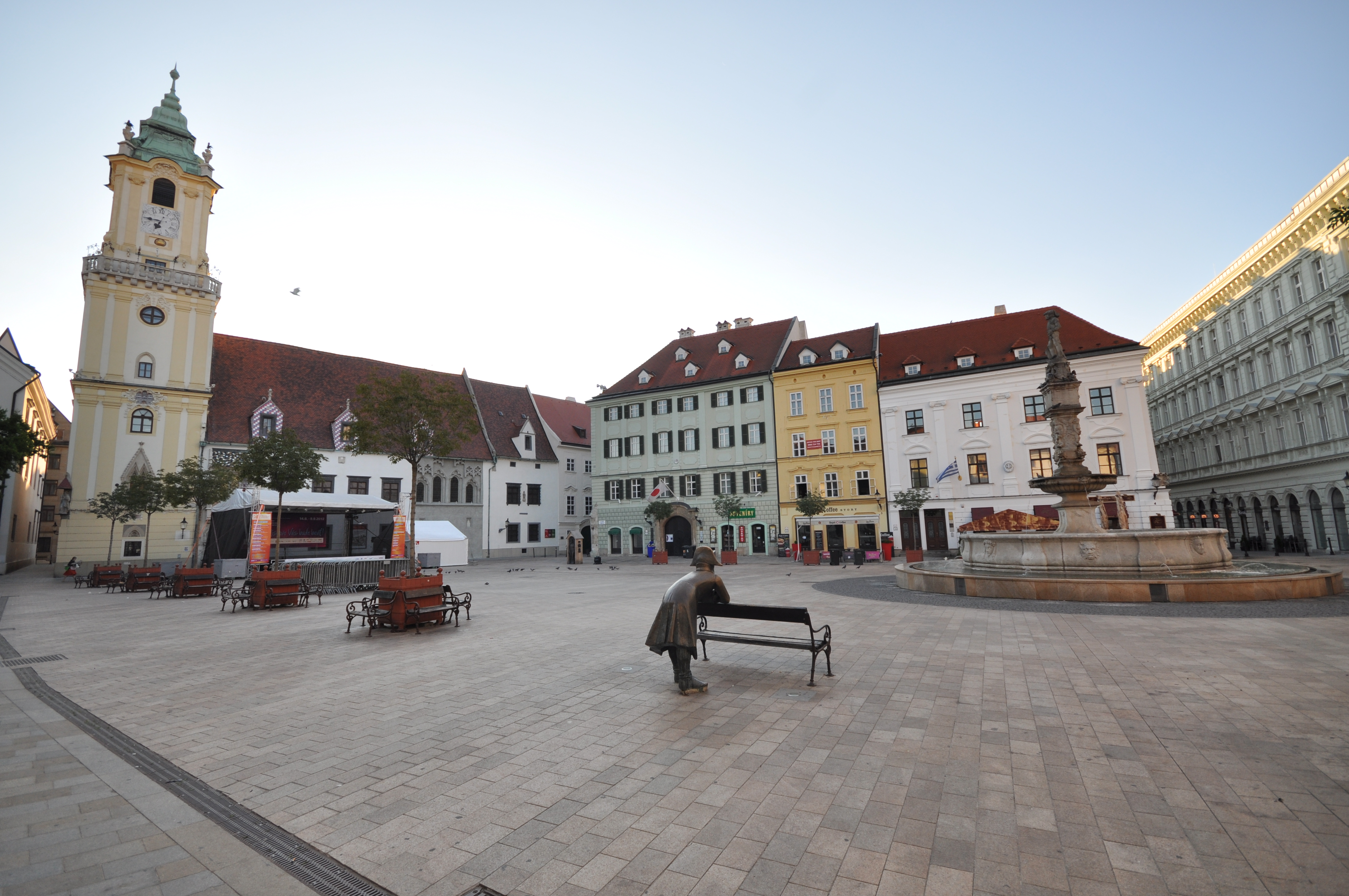
Main Square in Bratislava

Hlavné námestie (literally "Main Square") is one of the best known squares in Bratislava, Slovakia. It is located in the Old Town and it is often considered to be the center of the city.

Some of the main landmarks found in the square are the Old Town Hall and Roland Fountain.

== Name ==
During the Second World War, this square was named in honor of Adolf Hitler. During the communist period (1948–1989), the square was named Námestie 4. apríla (literally 4 April Square, April 4 having been the day when Bratislava was liberated by the Red Army at the end of World War II). Earlier names were Slovak: Hitlerovo namestie (1939–1945), Slovak: Masarykovo namestie, Hungarian: Ferenc József tér (1914), Hungarian: Fő tér, German: Hauptplatz (1879), German: Franz Joseph-Platz (1850), Latin: Forum civitatis (1668), German: Ring (1434), German: Markcht (1404), Latin: Forum (1373).

== Gallery ==
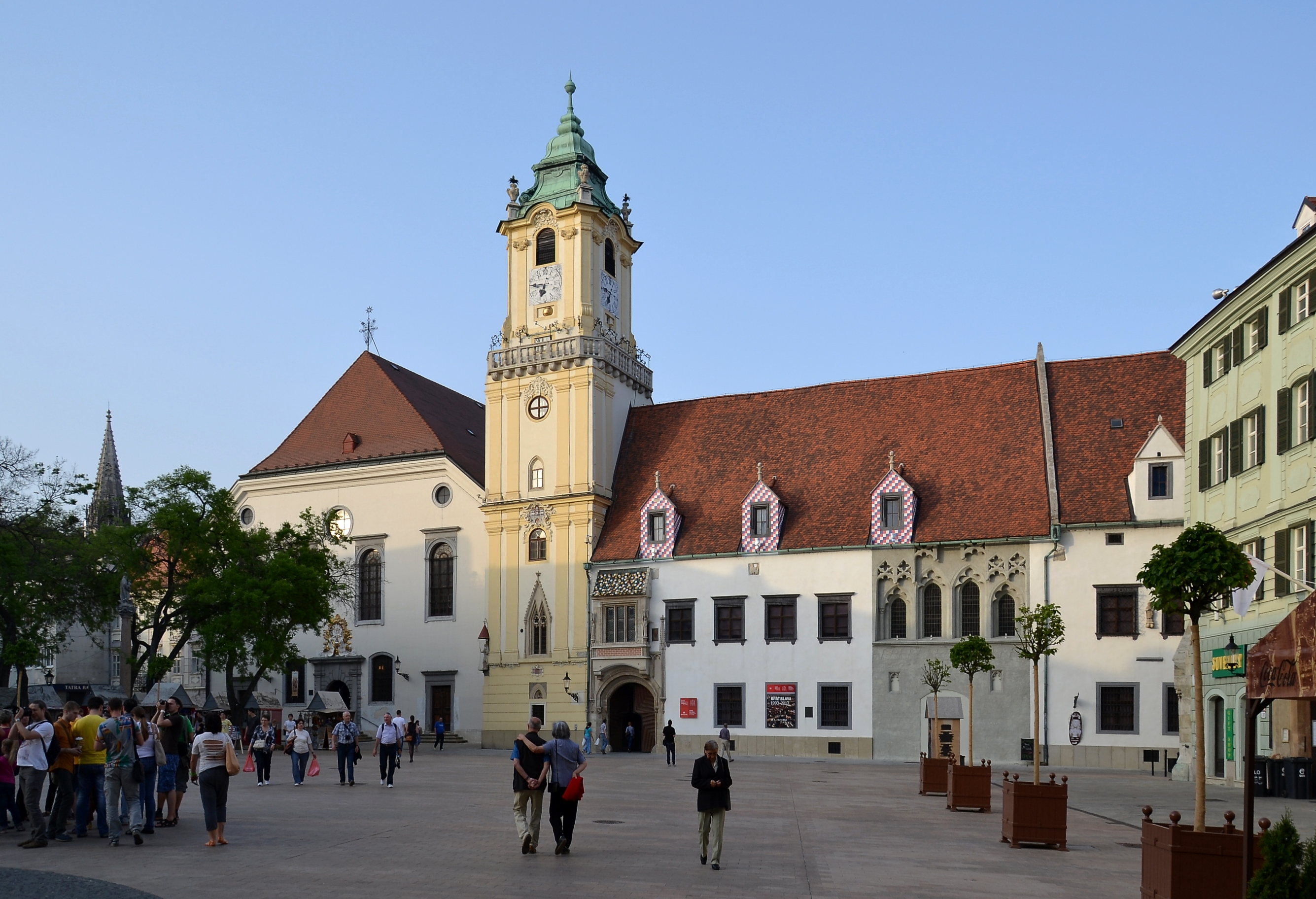
Old Town Hall

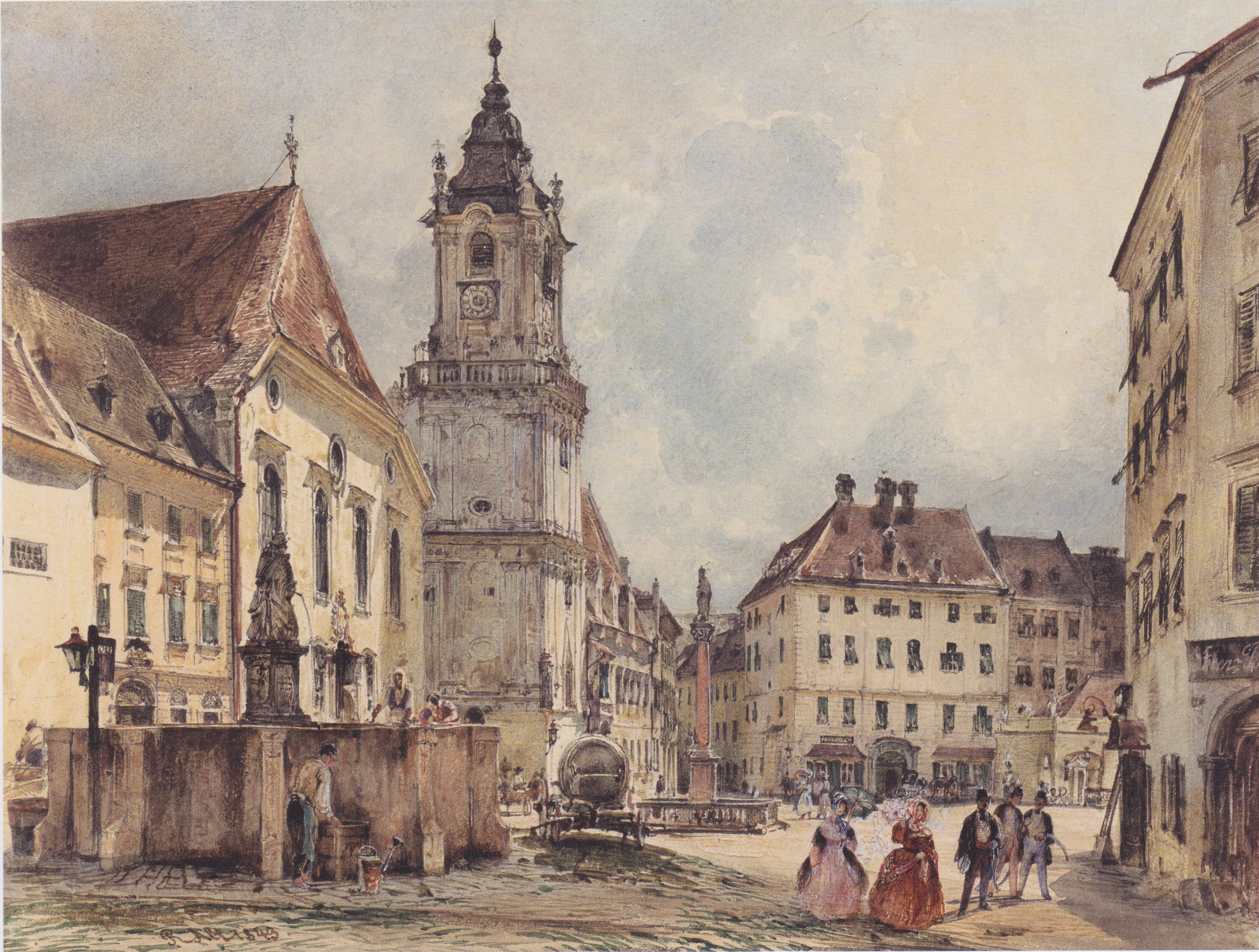
The square in 1843

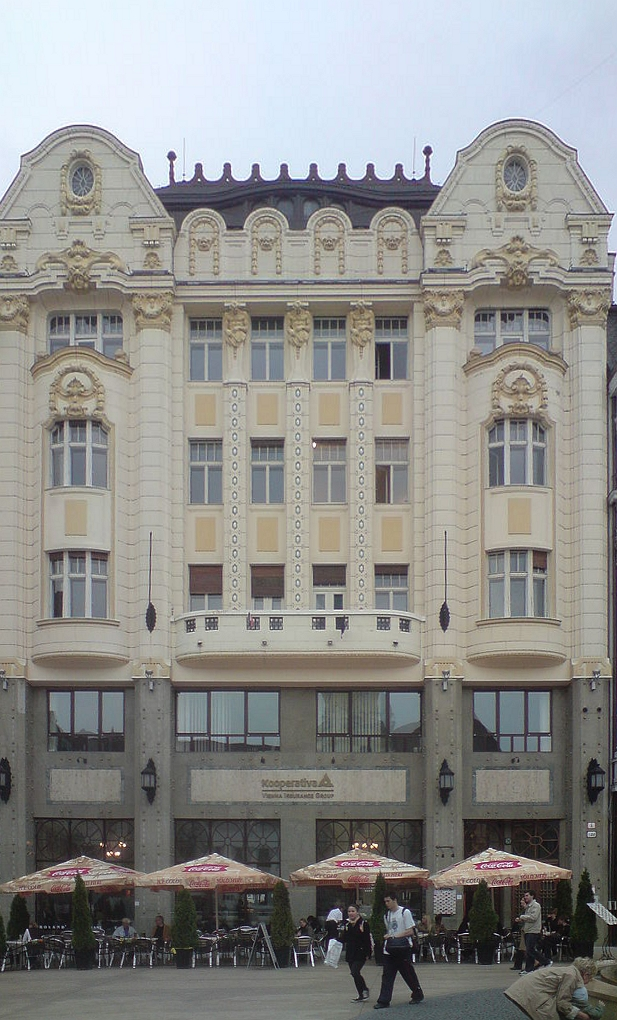
Palace of the Hungarian exchange bank (Uhorská eskontná a zmenárenská banka)

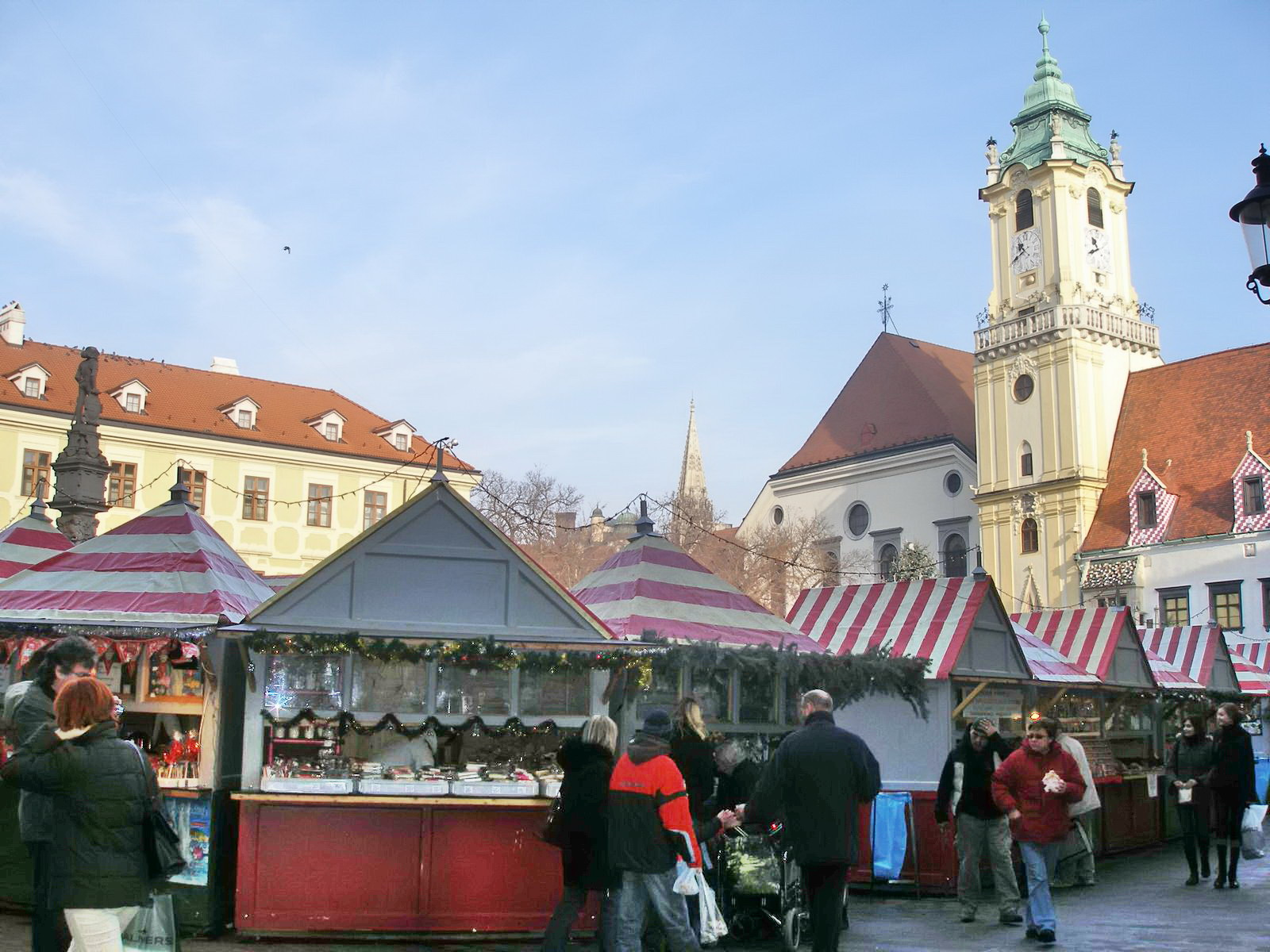
Christmas fair takes place each year on the square from the end of November until the end of December

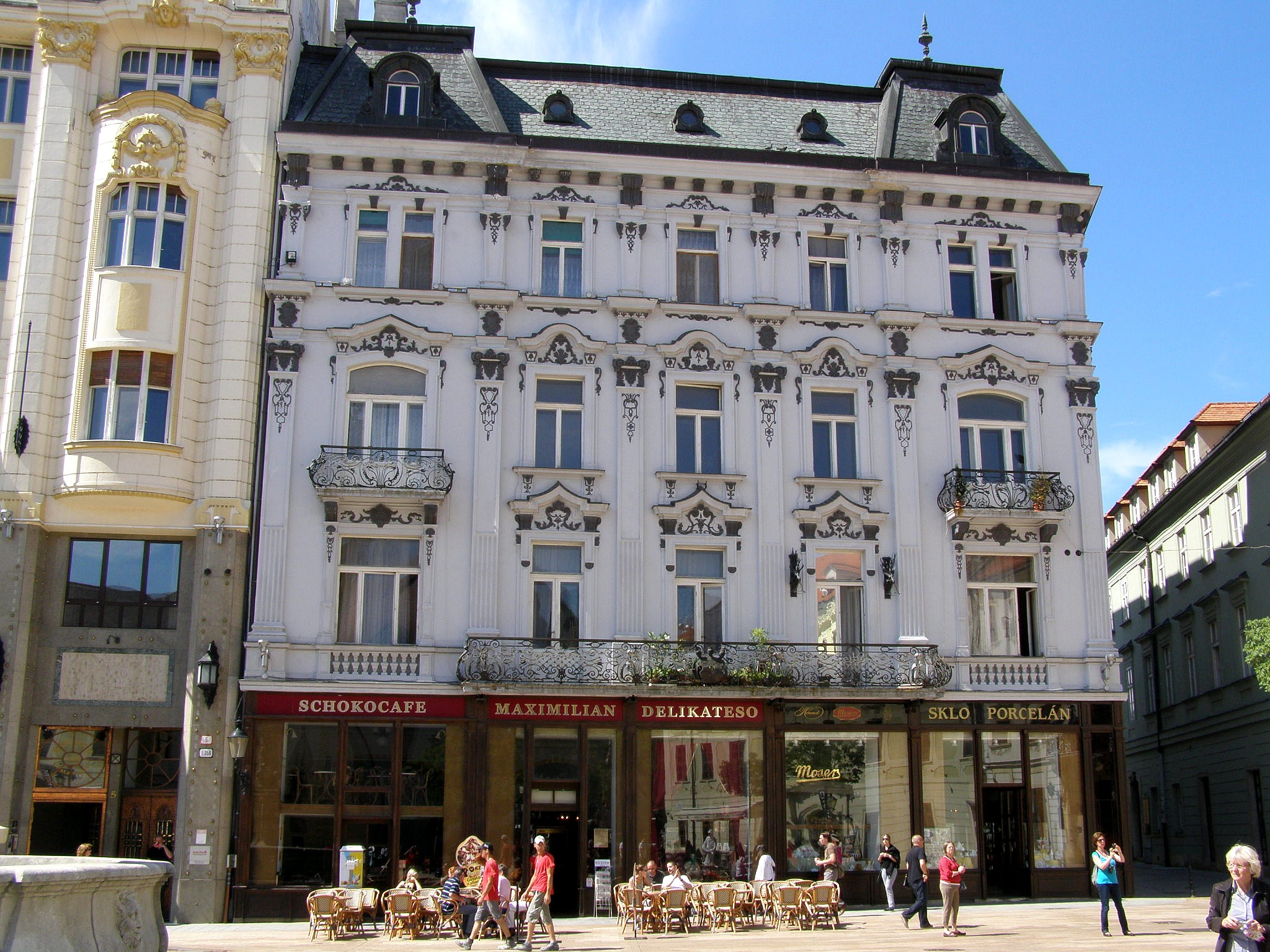
Palugyay Palace, Viktor Rumpelmayer, 1882–1883

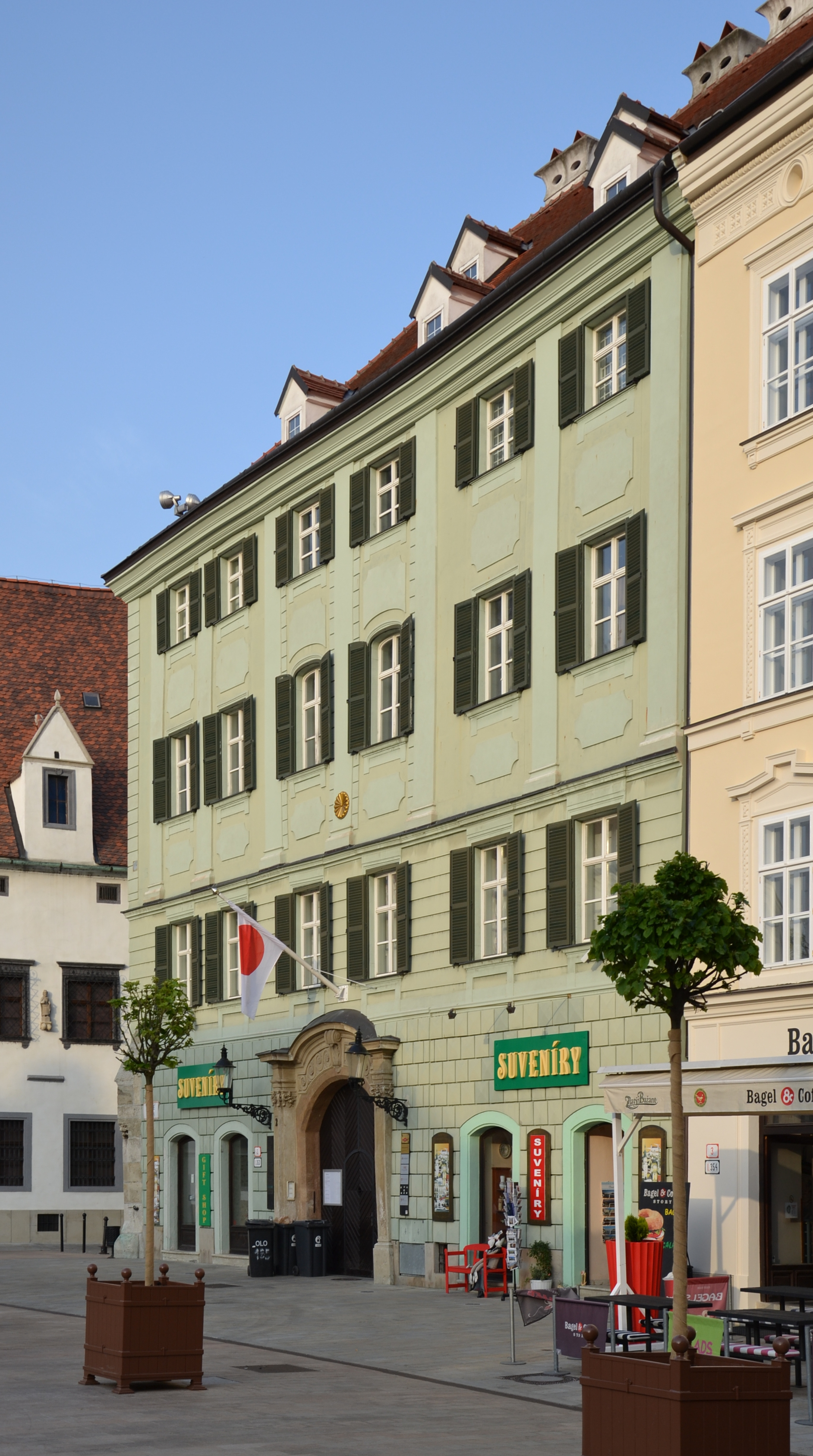
Japanese Embassy at Hlavné námestie

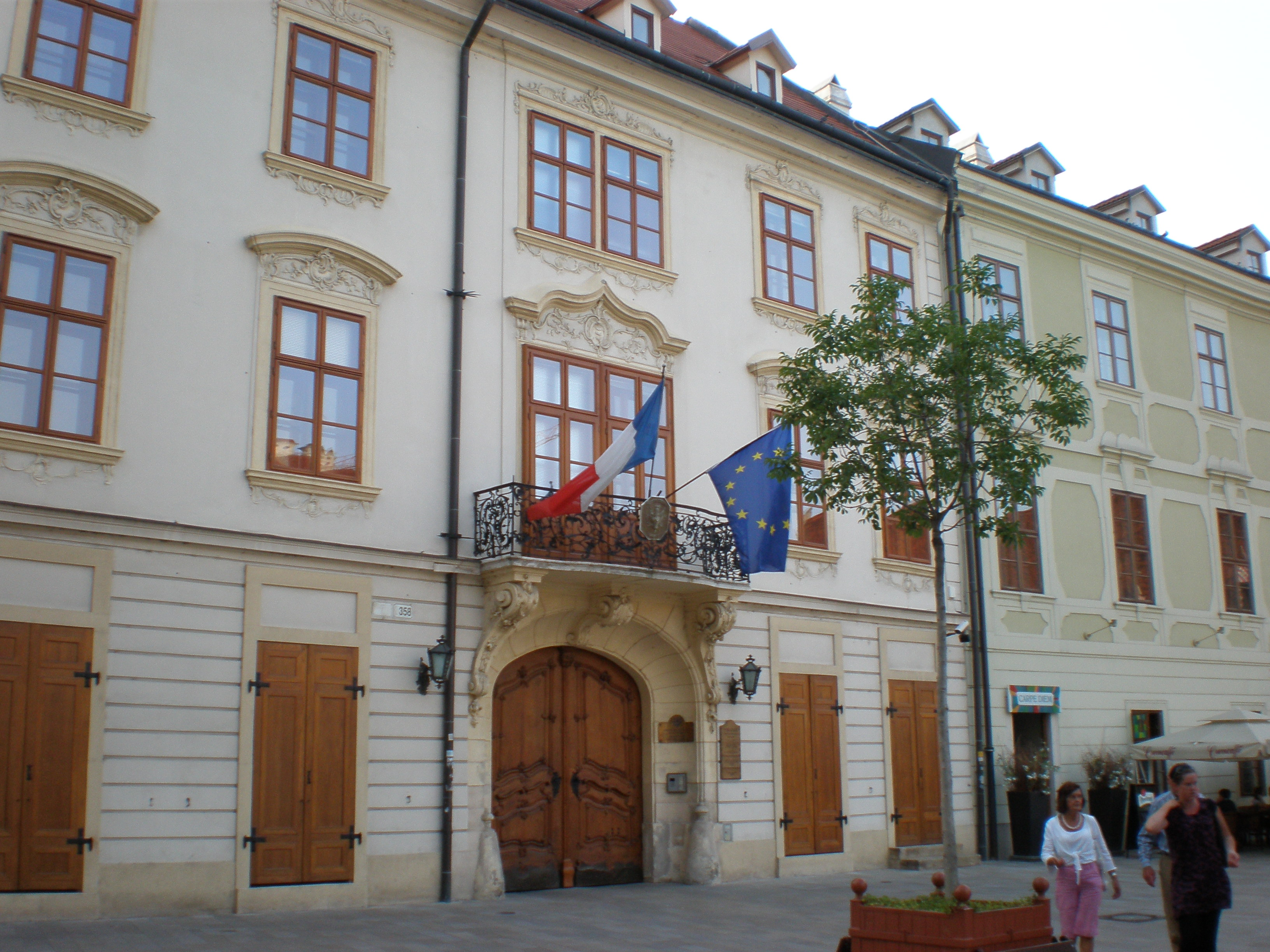
French Embassy at Hlavné námestie
