= Coat of arms of Bratislava =

- Armiger: Capital City of Bratislava
- Adopted: 1436

The coat of arms of Bratislava (German: Preßburg, Hungarian: Pozsony), Slovakia, has been used since 1436, when Sigismund of Luxembourg granted the town the right to use its own coat of arms. The coat of arms depicts, on a red late Gothic background, a silver three-towered fortification with a gate in the centre. There are two golden spheres on top of each tower and a golden half-raised portcullis in the gate.

It is a common misconception that the coat of arms represents the Bratislava Castle or any of the city's four medieval gates (Michael's Gate, Laurinc Gate, Fish [or Fishermen's] Gate or Vydrica Gate). In reality, it simply shows a general depiction of a medieval town.

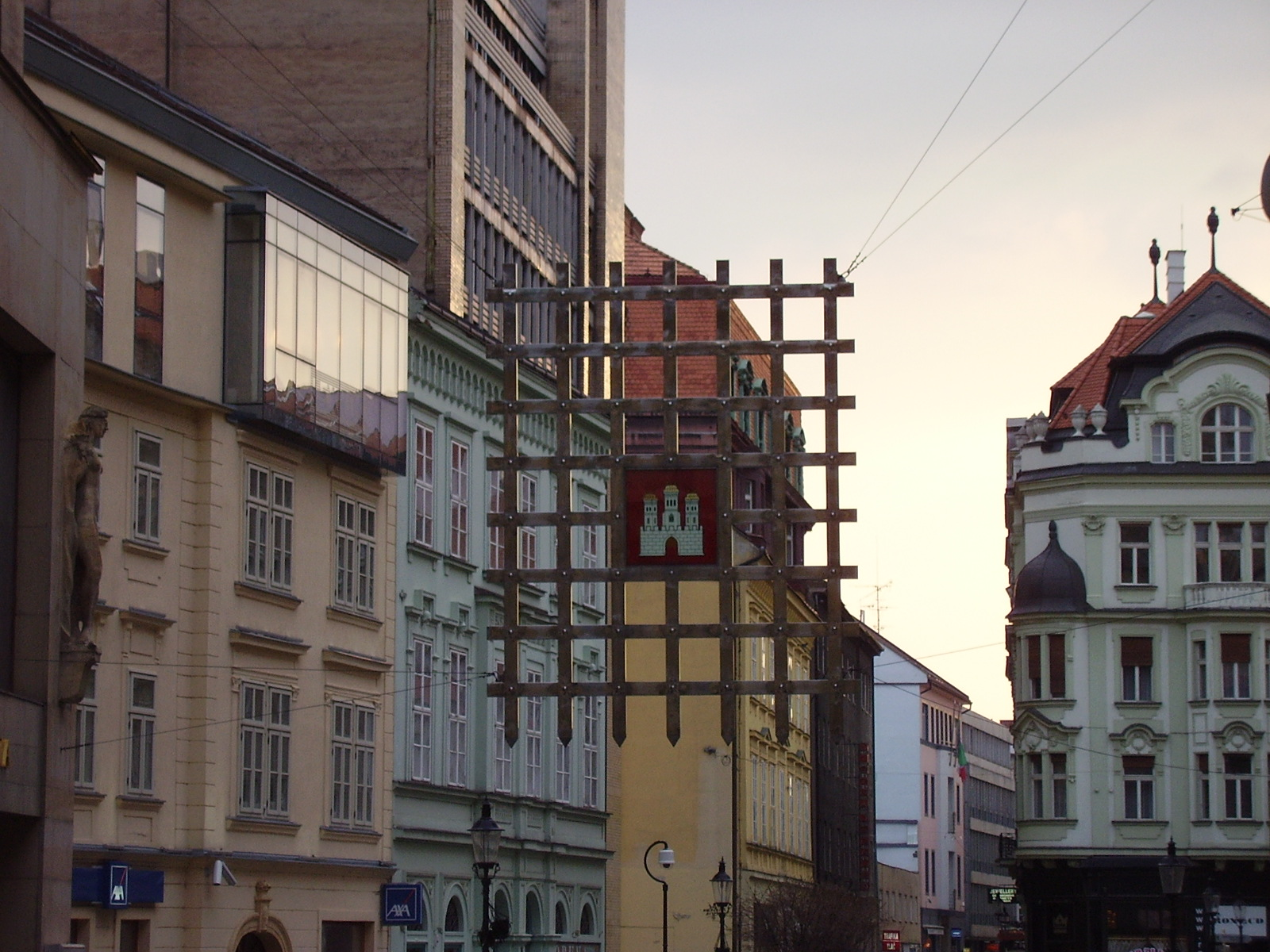
A hanging portcullis in Bratislava's Old Town, showing the city coat of arms in the centre

== See also ==
- Coat of arms of Slovakia
