= Podhradie, Bratislava =

Medieval city borough of Bratislava, Slovakia

Coordinates: 48.1404°N 17.1007°E

Vydrica in 2026

Construction below the Bratislava castle

Podhradie (Latin: Suburbium; German: Schlossgrund; Hungarian: Pozsony-Várallya) is a historical part of Bratislava, the capital of Slovakia, situated around the Bratislava Castle hill. Today, it consists of the areas of Zuckermandel, Vydrica and the area above Židovská Street. Until the 13th century, Podhradie consisted of various settlements situated around the castle, outside of the Bratislava city walls with all land on the castle hill belonging to the castle. Zuckermandel and Vydrica were incorporated in 1848 as the 4. district of the city of Bratislava and from 1850 until its partial demolition in the half of 20th century it was called Mesto Márie Terézie (German: Theresienstadt; Hungarian: Terézváros).

Podhradie was considered to be the most beautiful and picturesque part of the city, traditionally inhabited by the city poor, it was known especially for its inns and prostitution. Most parts of Podhradie were demolished in the 1950s and 1960s due to the construction of transport infrastructure on the Danube riverbank, including the New Bridge. Today, Zuckermandel is being re-developed with mixed residential/commercial buildings, as of 2017 the demolished Vydrica is for sale and the area above Židovská Street is stabilized, with no new large scale construction planned.

Podhradie contains notable landmarks, including ruins of the Water Tower from 1254, St. Nicholas' Church from 1661, Holy Trinity Church from 1738, House of the Good Shepherd from 1765 and it is home to the Museum of Clocks (part of the Bratislava City Museum), Archaeological Museum, Music Museum, Museum of Jewish Culture, Museum of Carpathian German Culture and Museum of Hungarian Culture in Slovakia (all part of the Slovak National Museum).

== Location and division ==
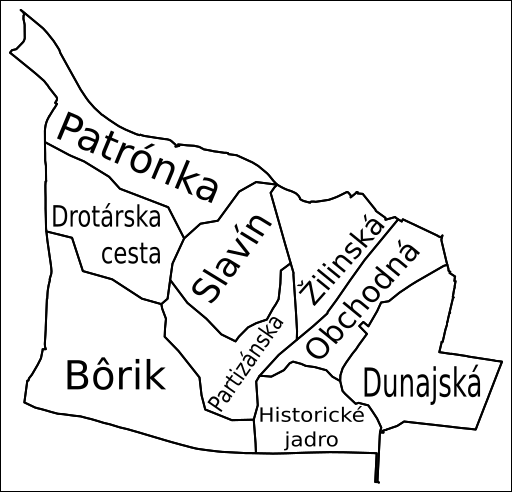
Due to its demolition in the 20th century, Podhradie is no longer part of the division of the Bratislava I district being represented here as the southeastern part of Bôrik.

Historically, Podhradie was basically everything situated around the Bratislava castle hill. Over centuries, Podhradie came to encompass mainly the southern and eastern parts, with only limited areas to the north and west of the castle. Today podhradie is part of the Bôrik area of the Bratislava I district and part of the borough of Old Town. It consists of three distinct areas:

- Zuckermandel - area from the western portal of the tunnel underneath the Bratislava castle hill, continuing eastwards it contains three high-rise paneláks from the 1960s (part of a large scale socialist construction project only partially realized in Zuckermandel), next, there is the newly constructed mixed use development project Zuckermandel by the J&T Group and continuing eastwards the area ends with an intact part of Žižkova Street containing the Holy Trinity Church and several medieval buildings spared from the 20th century demolition.
- Vydrica - area from Židovská street to the northeast, stretching in a south west direction until the ruins of the Water Tower. The north-east part contains a few original buildings with the rest of houses constructed at the end of the 20th century. The rest of Vydrica after the end of Židovská Street was demolished and as of 2017, the land was for sale.
- Bratislava castle hill - dimensions of the southern side of the Bratislava castle rock changed over time, since rock was mined here at least since the Middle Ages. The western part of the hill situated above Zuckermandel is steep and it was never used otherwise than defensively. The eastern part is more shallow and historically, it contained vineyards that were later developed into steep city streets. Remnants of the demolished buildings and streets are still visible on the hill.

Urbanistically, the area includes also parts of the Bratislava Riverfront and the small intact historical part of Zuckermandel is treated as a separate area called Kúrie.

== History ==
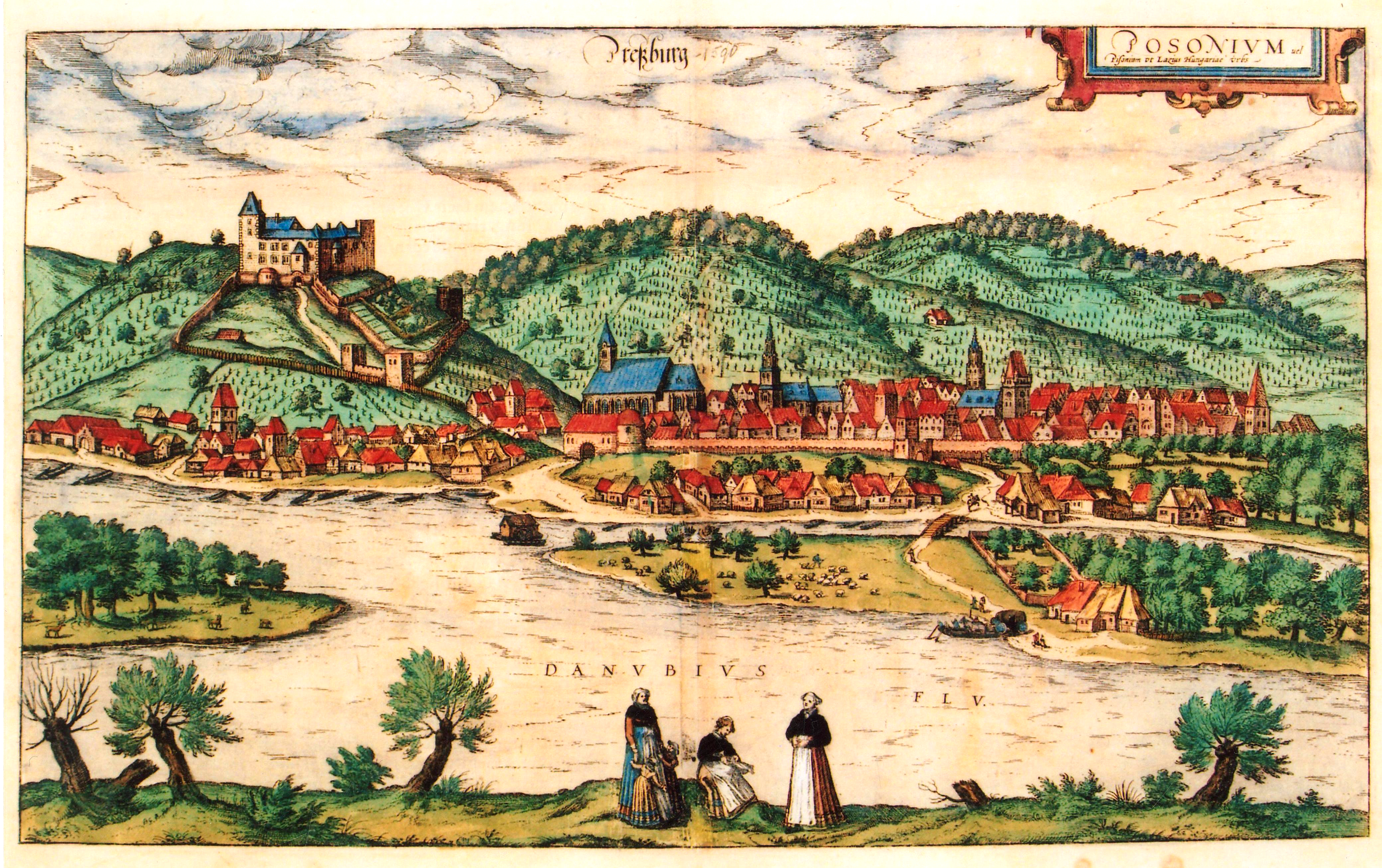
Bratislava in the 16th century, Podhradie depicted in the left part of the picture

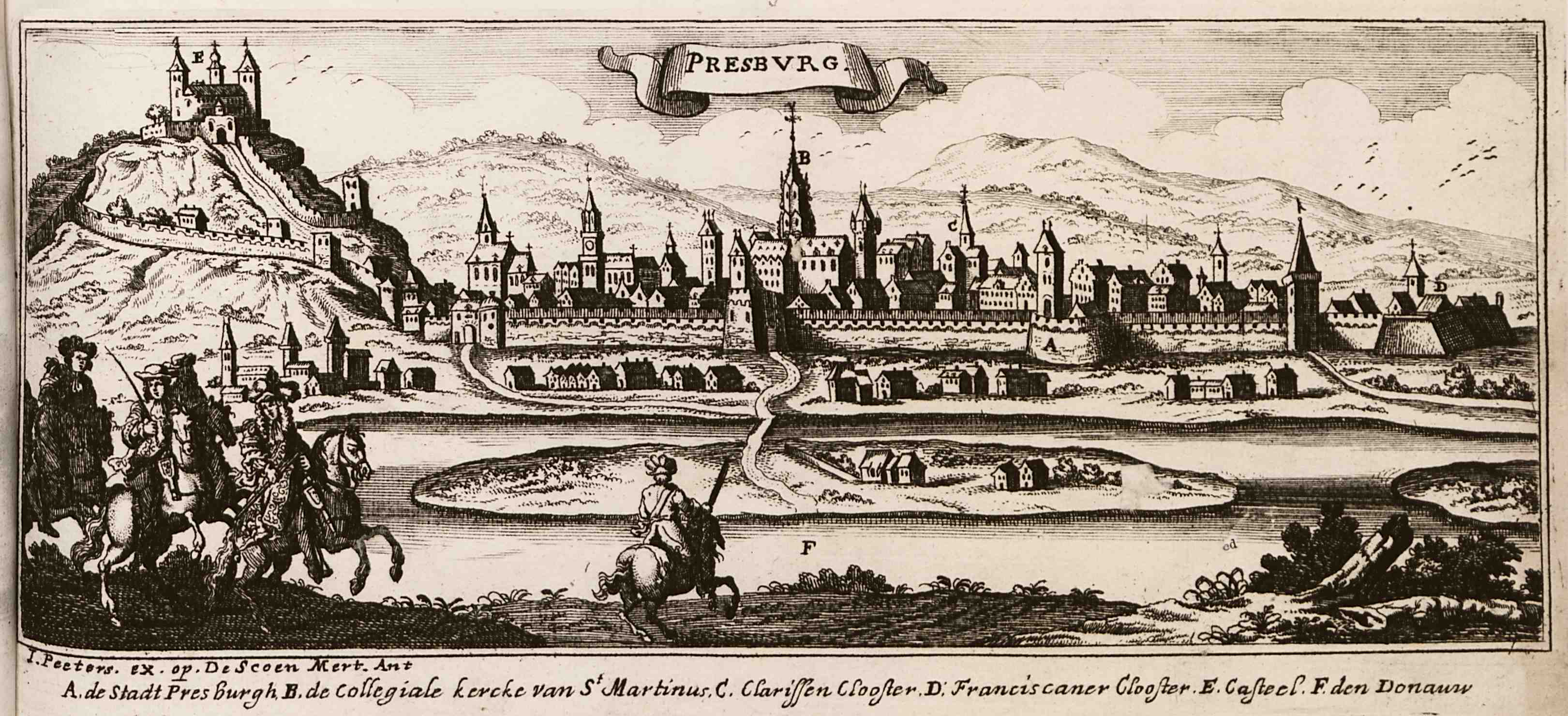
Bratislava in the 17th century, Podhradie depicted in the left part of the picture

According to historian Tivadar Ortvay, the name Vydrica comes from the Vydrica river that today flows through the city of Bratislava. The area to the west of the Bratislava (the city was known as Pressburg / Poszony throughout much of its history) city walls af far as the area of Mlynská dolina was called Vydrica (German: Veidritz; Hungarian: Vödric), including the areas of Zuckermandel and Medzierka/Fudlcuken/Lucsony. We know from the decree of king Ladislaus IV of Hungary from 1280, that the mayor of Podhradie was Jacob. In a tax register from 1379 the area is described as Wedroczca. The settlement had defensive walls and palisades and it was connected to the Bratislava city walls by a wooden bridge. A school in Vydrica is mentioned in 1380.

Decree of Sigismund, Holy Roman Emperor from 17 March 1390 takes Podhradie out of the jurisdiction of the Bratislava Castle (jure castri) and hands it over to the jurisdiction of the city of Bratislava. Sisigmund renewed the city rights of Podhradie in 1423. City government consisted of a mayor, notary, six members of the city council, six sworn members and some clerks. The city itself had multi-story buildings, churches, elementary school and a city guard. The area contained a quarry which was an important employer at that time and a royal bathhouse also called the bathhouse of the castle captain.

In 1558 the main street in Vydrica called Vydrica/Veidritz/Vödric or Veľká Vydrica/Grosse Weidritz/Nagy Vödric was paved. An engraving from 1574 confirms the presence of vineyards at Vodný vrch (German: Am Wasserberg; Hungarian: Pozsony-Vízhegy). Opposite the Vodný vrch there used to be a river island called Geraidt with flourishing gardening. Written documents attest to the high productivity of these gardens.

In 1785, Podhradie had 87 houses, in 1815 it was 241 houses, 10 manors and 1203 families, in 1865 Podhradie had 395 buildings. City privileges ceased to exist in 1850 when Podhradie was fully incorporated into the city of Bratislava. In 1904, a new city swimming pool was constructed in Zuckermandel.

In 1941, architect Alfréd Piffl, a professor of architecture at the Slovak University of Technology in Bratislava started a wholescale documentation project of Podhradie which he later continued as the head of research conducted during the construction of the New Bridge by the Archaeological Institute of the Slovak Academy of Sciences in 1967-1970. His lifelong project was finished in October 1970.

== Gallery ==
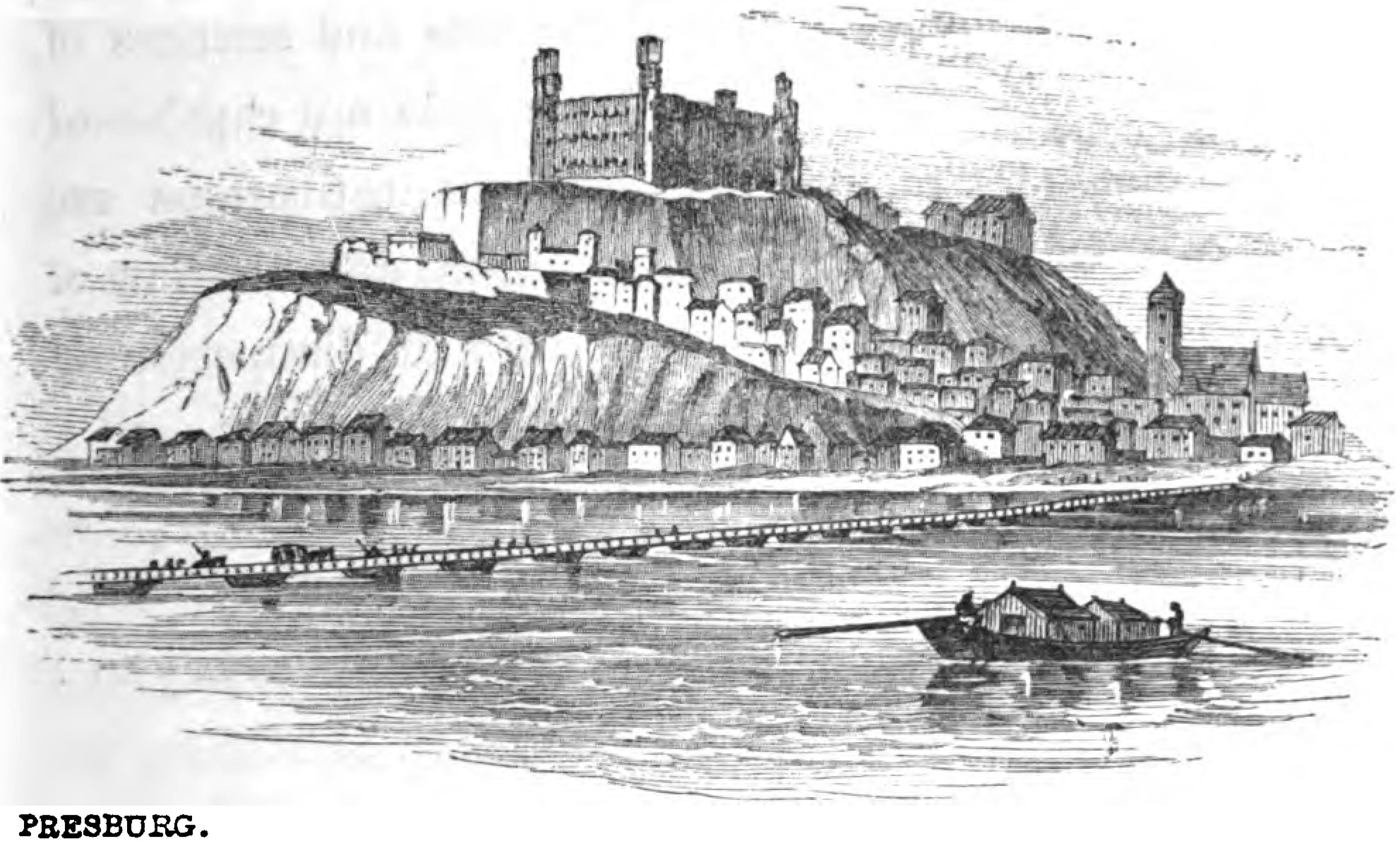
Podhradie in 1855

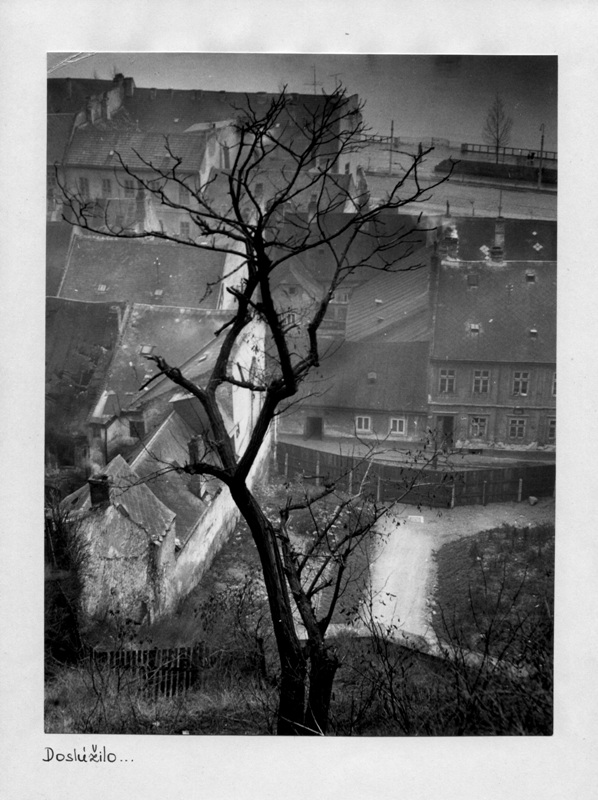
Historical photograph of Podhradie

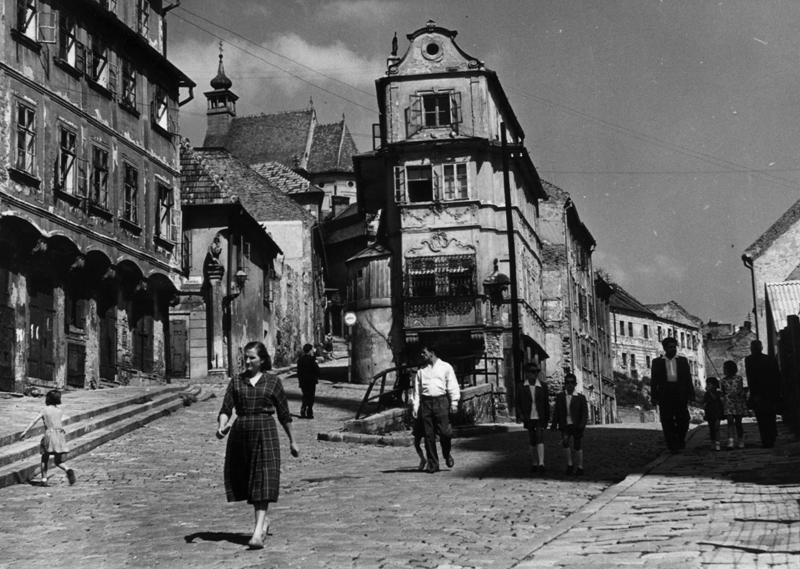
House of the Good Shepherd with Mikulášska Street and Židovská Street in the 1930s

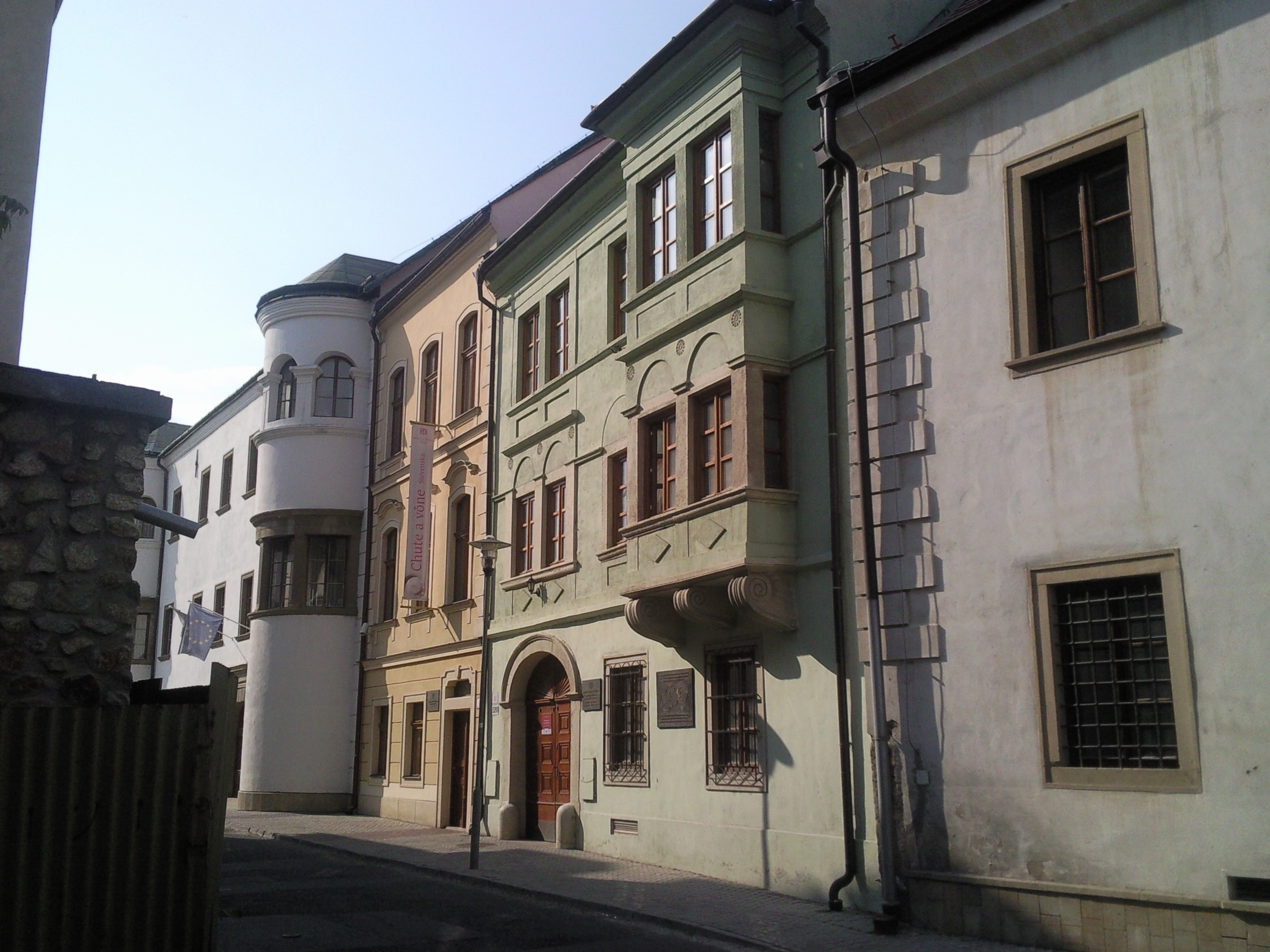
Manor houses on Žizkova Street, spared from the demolition

== See also ==
- Boroughs and localities of Bratislava
- History of Bratislava
- Tourism in Slovakia
