= Red Crayfish Pharmacy =

Coordinates: 48°08′43″N 17°06′24″E

- Lekáreň U červeného raka
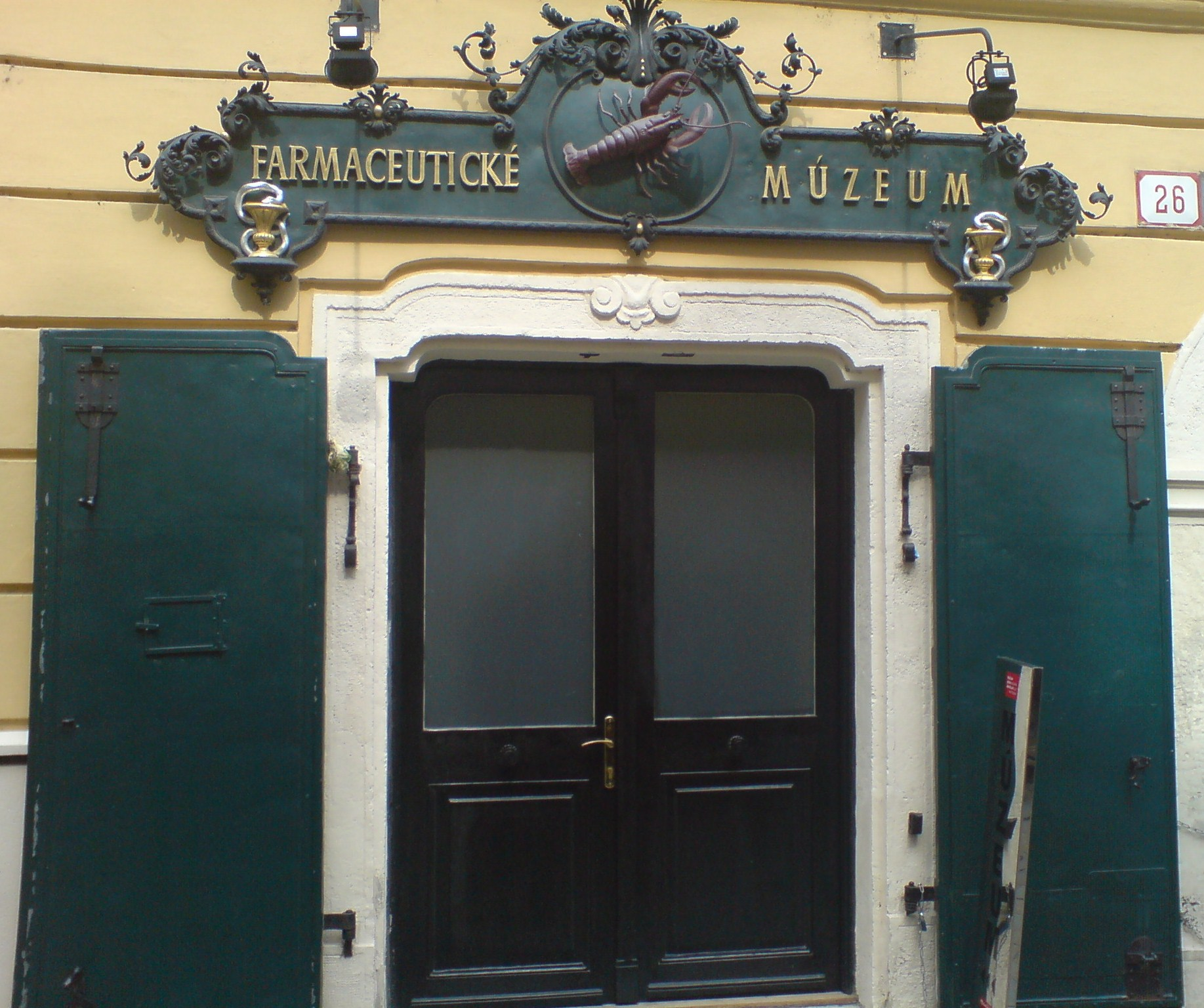
- Entrance to the Museum of Pharmacy in Bratislava, Slovakia
- Interactive map of the Red Crayfish Pharmacy area

General information
- Type: defensive barbican
- Architectural style: baroque
- Location: Old Town of Bratislava, Slovakia, Michalská Street No. 26, Bratislava
- Current tenants: Museum of Pharmacy
- Renovated: 18th century
- Owner: City of Bratislava; Tera Trade

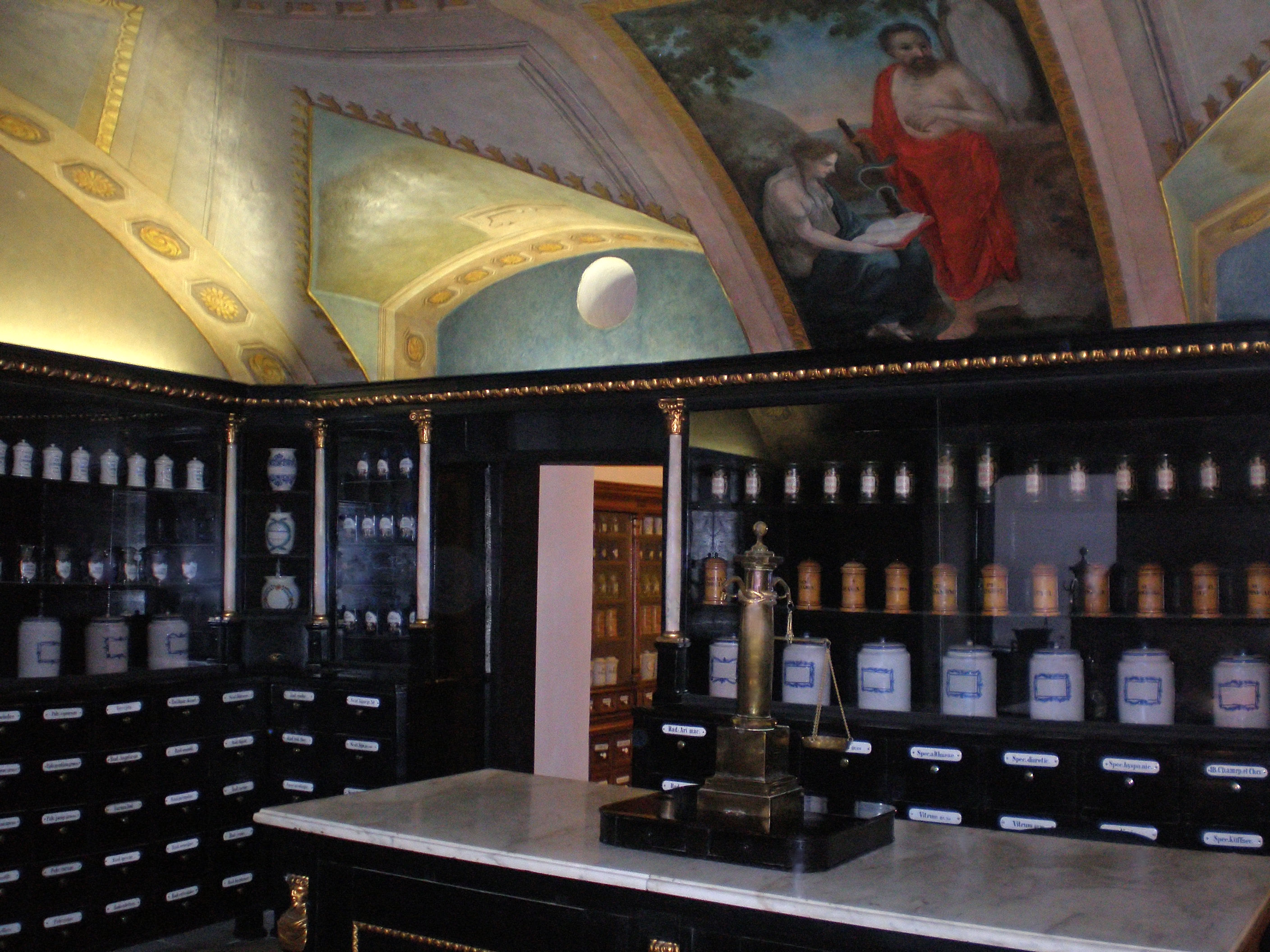
Interior of the entrance room of the Red Crayfish Pharmacy

Red Crayfish Pharmacy (Slovak: Lekáreň U červeného raka) is a baroque building and former pharmacy from the 16th century in the Old Town of Bratislava, Slovakia. Since 1953 it houses the Museum of Pharmacy of the Bratislava City Museum. Today, the exhibition features three of the original five rooms of the former pharmacy complete with historical furniture, pharmacy equipment and Baroque – Classicist paintings and wall decorations. The museum contains an original edition of works by Paracelsus from 1574.

== History of the pharmacy ==
The original pharmacy “Red Crayfish” appears in records as early as the mid-16th century. In 1773 the pharmacy is listed as one of five operating in Bratislava.

== History of the building ==
Michalská Street No. 26 is a baroque burgher's house built within the barbican of the Michael's Gate adjacent to the Bratislava Water Moat. In the mid-18th century the front façade of the house was re-constructed in the Classicist style and extended with a stone entrance in the Rococo style. The front façade is adorned with an original cast-iron pharmacy sign with forged canthus ornamentation and a crayfish from the end of the 19th century, manufactured by the known Bratislava blacksmith company Márton. The pharmacy and the apartment above the pharmacy were owned by the Feldesh family, a Jewish family that was deported by the Nazis during Holocaust to the Auschwitz concentration camp. The descendants of the family live today in Israel.

== Today ==
The current exhibition displays the history of pharmacy in Bratislava in the first three rooms. The entrance room is furnished with the original Red Crayfish Pharmacy fittings. The furniture set constructed from stained beech in the Empire style standing along three walls of the room is supplemented with a tare balance and a stand for a hand-balance. This equipment is supplemented with faience, stoneware, wooden, china and glass containers for storing medicines dating from a period extending from the end of the 18th century up to the 1950s. The room contains paintings in the Baroque – Classicist style from the end of the 18th century with a theme of healing, with a balustrade and three figurative compositions on the vaulted ceiling.

The pharmaceutical collection contains 8,500 items and 2,880 volumes of ancient pharmaceutical literature and it one of the largest of its kind in Slovakia. It contains original items of pharmaceutical equipment, the oldest originating from the 16th century. The Baroque and Classicist furniture and most of the faience, stoneware, glass, wooden and tin vessels for preserving medicines were made in Slovakia. The oldest dispensing containers, simple tools for the preparation of medicines, laboratory ware and metallic sign-boards were also manufactured within the territory of Slovakia, up to the time of the unification of pharmacies in the second half of the 19th century.

The literature from the 16th century includes an original edition of works by Paracelsus from 1574. The first quadri-lingual tariff of medicines entitled “Taxa pharmaceutica posoniensis”, published in 1745 in Bratislava, which was valid throughout the Kingdom of Hungary is prized locally as an example of the earliest known Slovak pharmaceutical terminology.

== See also ==
- Pharmacy Salvator
- Old Town, Bratislava
- Tourism in Slovakia
