= Holy Trinity Church, Podhradie =

Coordinates: 48.1403°N 17.0975°E

Holy Trinity Church Kostol Najsvätejšej Trojice
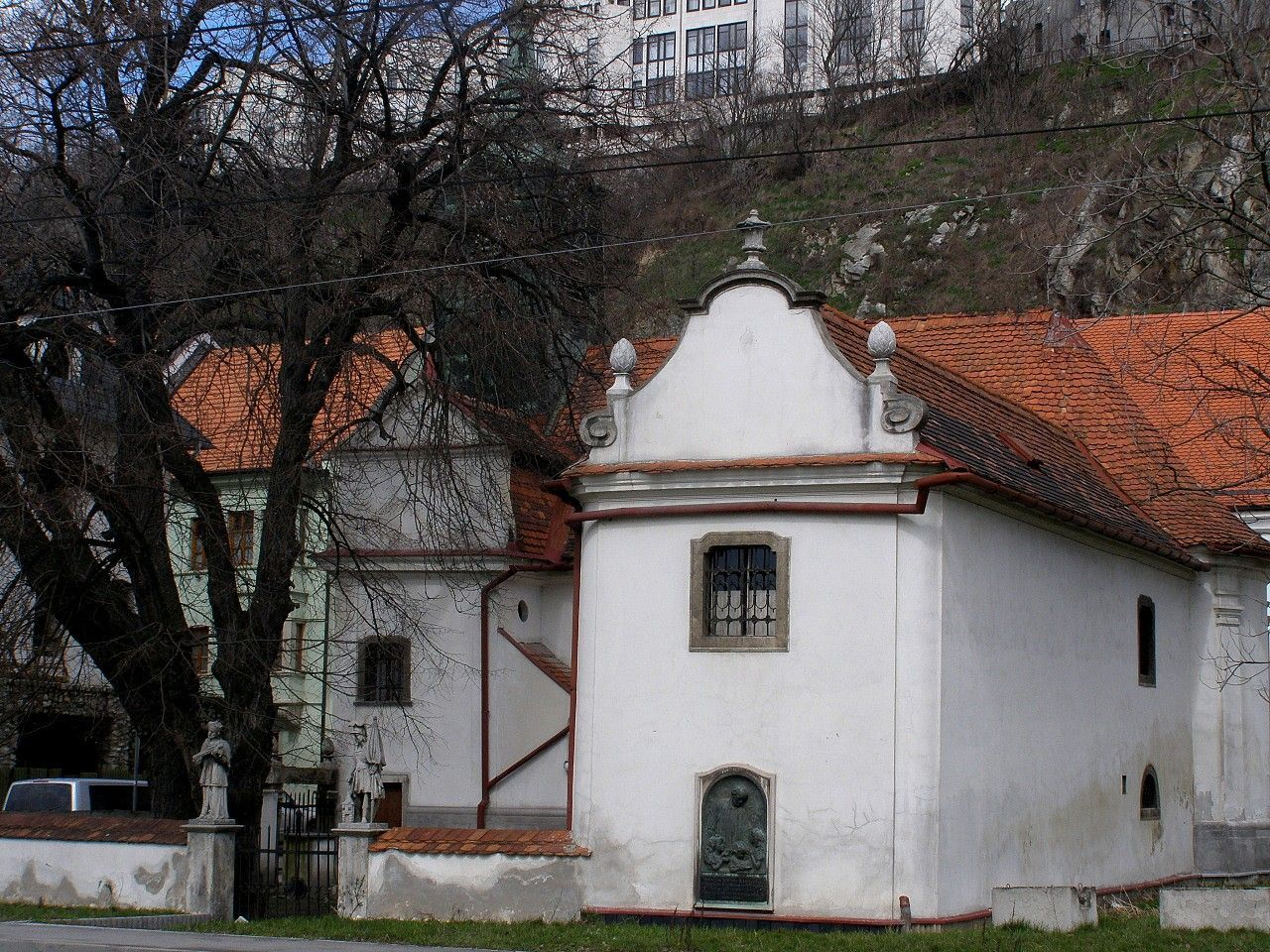
- Holy Trinity Church in Podhradie, Bratislava

Religion
- Affiliation: Roman Catholic
- Ecclesiastical or organizational status: Filial church
- Year consecrated: 1738

Location
- Location: Old Town, Bratislava, Slovakia
- Interactive map of Holy Trinity Church; Kostol Najsvätejšej Trojice

Architecture
- Architect: Franz Anton Pilgram
- Completed: 1738

Website
- http://podhradie.fara.sk/: Address: Kostol Najsvätejšej Trojice - Podhradie Žižkova Street No. 3 811 01 Bratislava; E-mail: podhradie@ba.ecclesia.sk

The Holy Trinity Church (Slovak: Kostol Najsvätejšej Trojice) is a Roman Catholic church in Podhradie, a historical part of Bratislava, the capital of Slovakia situated underneath the Bratislava Castle next to the Danube riverbank.

Today, the church is located in the demolished and now re-developed area of Zuckermandel as one of the few remaining original buildings. The church is active and it serves as a filial church of the Parish of St. Martin. The church is sometimes confused with the Old Cathedral of Saint John of Matha and Saint Felix of Valois in Bratislava because of the similarity of Slovak names of both churches.

== History ==
The church was constructed between 1734 and 1738 at the place of an older chapel. In 1713, an epidemic of plague ended in Podhradie and as a result a wooden chapel was erected at the place of today's church in the same year. Later, it was replaced by a brick church building probably as a consequence of the evangelisation efforts of Imre Esterházy de Galántha, the archbishop of Esztergom. Foundation stone was laid on 15 April 1734 by bishop Jozef Berényi, vicar of primas Imre Esterházy and the new church was consecrated on 18 May 1738 by Bratislava (the city was known mainly as Pressburg/Poszony throughout its history) priest Matej Mack. Blueprints for the building were created by Kitler and Gratzl and the construction was budgeted at 25 000 zlatých (unspecified local currency). According to Hungarian historian Pál Voit, the notable Austrian baroque era architect Franz Anton Pilgram contributed to the project.

Karol Scherz de Vasoja (1807–1888) became priest in this church in 1855. He was widely known for his charitable work and over time he saved the lives of over 50 people during floods and fires. After being accidentally hit by a horse-drawn carriage and dying of his injuries the following day, he was mourned by many citizens of Bratislava. In 1908 a bronze memorial plate by artist Alojz Rigele commemorating Scherz was installed on the wall of the church.

== Description ==
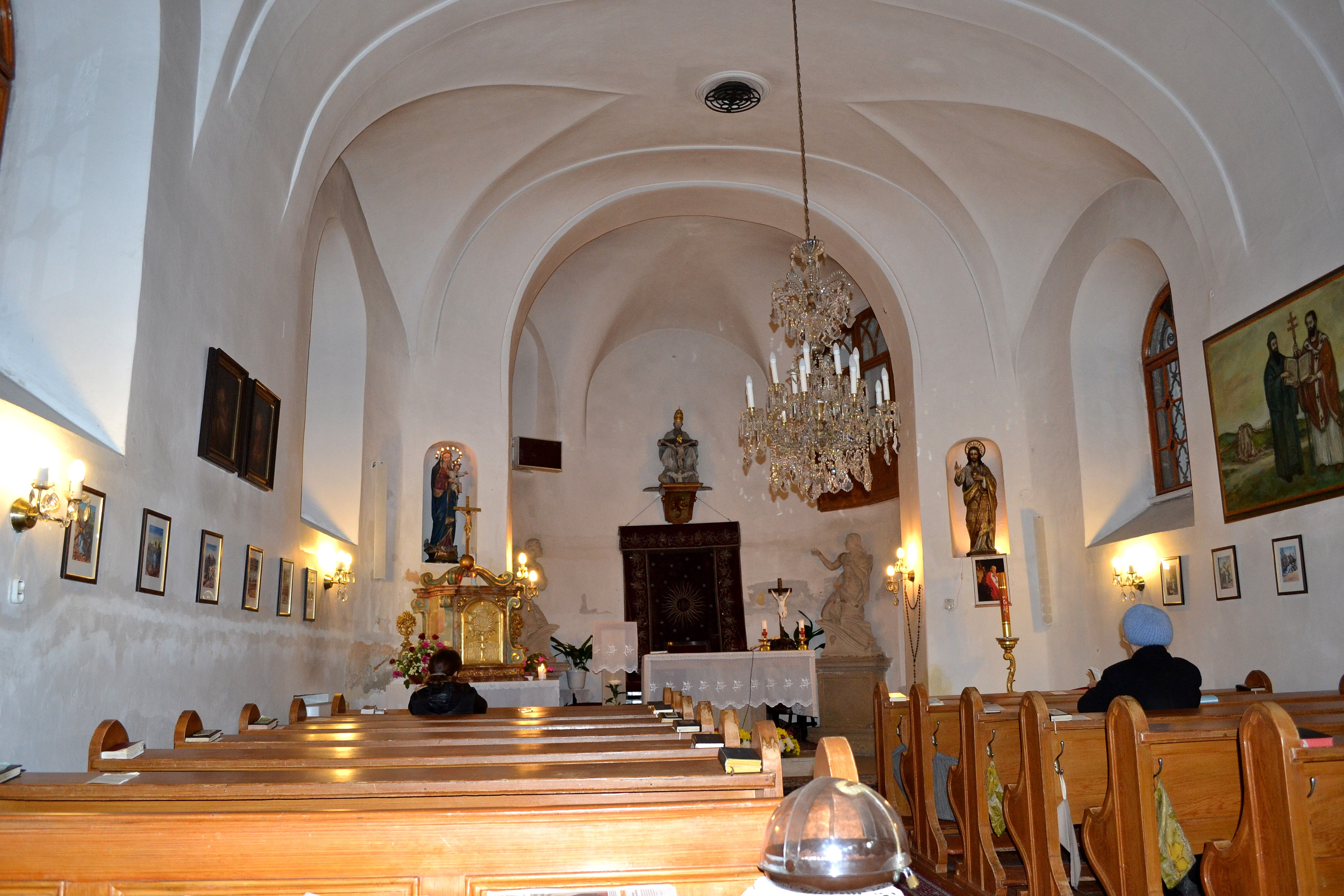
Interior of the Holy Trinity Church

The building's east–west orientation is a traditional Christian one. The church building itself is joined in a right angle by the two-story parish building built in the 19th century at the place of a one-story sacristy. The space created by the two wings creates a court that is fenced by a short brick wall with shingled roof with a small metal gate. The gate is flanked by the statues of Saint John of Nepomuk and Saint Florian. The court contains a stone cross depicting the crucifixion of Jesus. Southern wall of the parish building contains the aforementioned commemorative bronze memorial plate by Alojz Rigele.

The main altar consists of an altar table and a statue of the holy trinity. The altar is flanked by two statues from both sides, Saint Roch and Saint Sebastian, both patrons against the plague. It is believed that the statues come from the workshop of Georg Rafael Donner.

The building contains two church bells, a big one named in 1761 after the Holy Trinity and a little one, named after Saint Roch. The church tower also has a clock facing in all four directions.

== See also ==
- Podhradie, Bratislava
- History of Bratislava
