= Laurinc Gate =

Coordinates: 48.1436°N 17.1109°E

- Laurinská brána
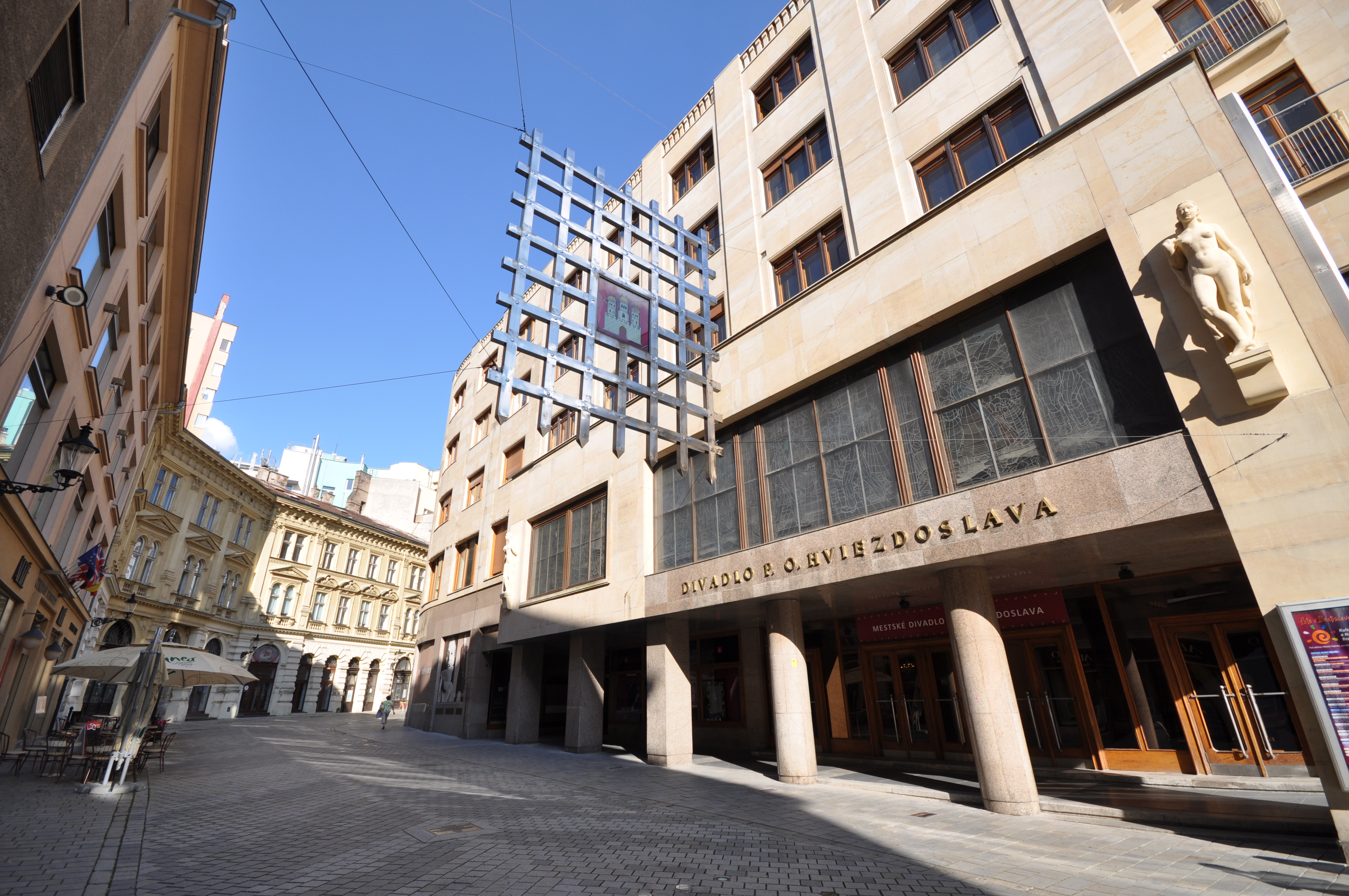
- The place of Laurinc Gate is marked by a hanging portcullis gate.
- Interactive map of the Laurinc Gate area

General information
- Type: City gate from medieval fortifications
- Location: Bratislava, Slovakia
- Construction started: 13th century
- Completed: 14th century
- Demolished: 1778

Laurinc Gate (Slovak: Laurinská brána) was a medieval town gate in the historical Old Town of Bratislava, the capital of Slovakia. It was built in the 14th century and demolished by the order of Empress Maria Theresa of Austria in the 18th century together with most of the city walls, because the inner walls were limiting the town's growth. It was named after Saint Lawrence.

Unlike the Michael's Gate, the only medieval city gate still standing in Bratislava, Laurinc Gate did not contain a tall tower. Instead, it was a massive square-shaped structure with a long tunnel at the ground floor. There was a water moat in front of it and unlike the sometimes dry moat near Michael's Gate, this one always contained water due to its proximity to the Danube and the presence of the mouth of a stream coming down from the Little Carpathians mountains. Today, a portcullis hanging over Laurinská Street symbolizes the place of the former Laurinc Gate.

== History ==
Laurinc Gate was constructed together with the oldest parts of the city walls in the second half of the 13th century. Through most of its history, Bratislava was known as Pressburg or Pozsony. The gate was continually strengthened and improved over the centuries.

Its name comes from a small church that stood directly in front of it (later demolished in the first half of the 16th century. The church, together with its chapel was consecrated to Saint Lawrence (Slovak: Svätý Laurinc). He was considered to be the patron of travelers and the name stuck. The first reference to the gate comes from the year 1412.

At the beginning of the 18th century, a pillar with the statue of Saint Florian was built in front of the gate.

== Today ==
A hanging gate doors symbolise the place of the Laurinc Gate today. There were never any plans to rebuild or reconstruct the demolished tourist attraction in the past, nor in the present.
