= Saint James's Chapel, Bratislava =

Saint James's Chapel
- Kaplnka svätého Jakuba
- Interactive map of the Saint James's Chapel area

General information
- Type: Chapel, Ossuary
- Architectural style: Romanesque, Gothic
- Location: Bratislava, Slovakia, Námestie SNP, Bratislava (no assigned address)
- Coordinates: 48°8′44.2″N 17°6′36.98″E
- Construction started: 11th / 12th century
- Completed: Gothic chapel from the 15th century
- Demolished: 1529

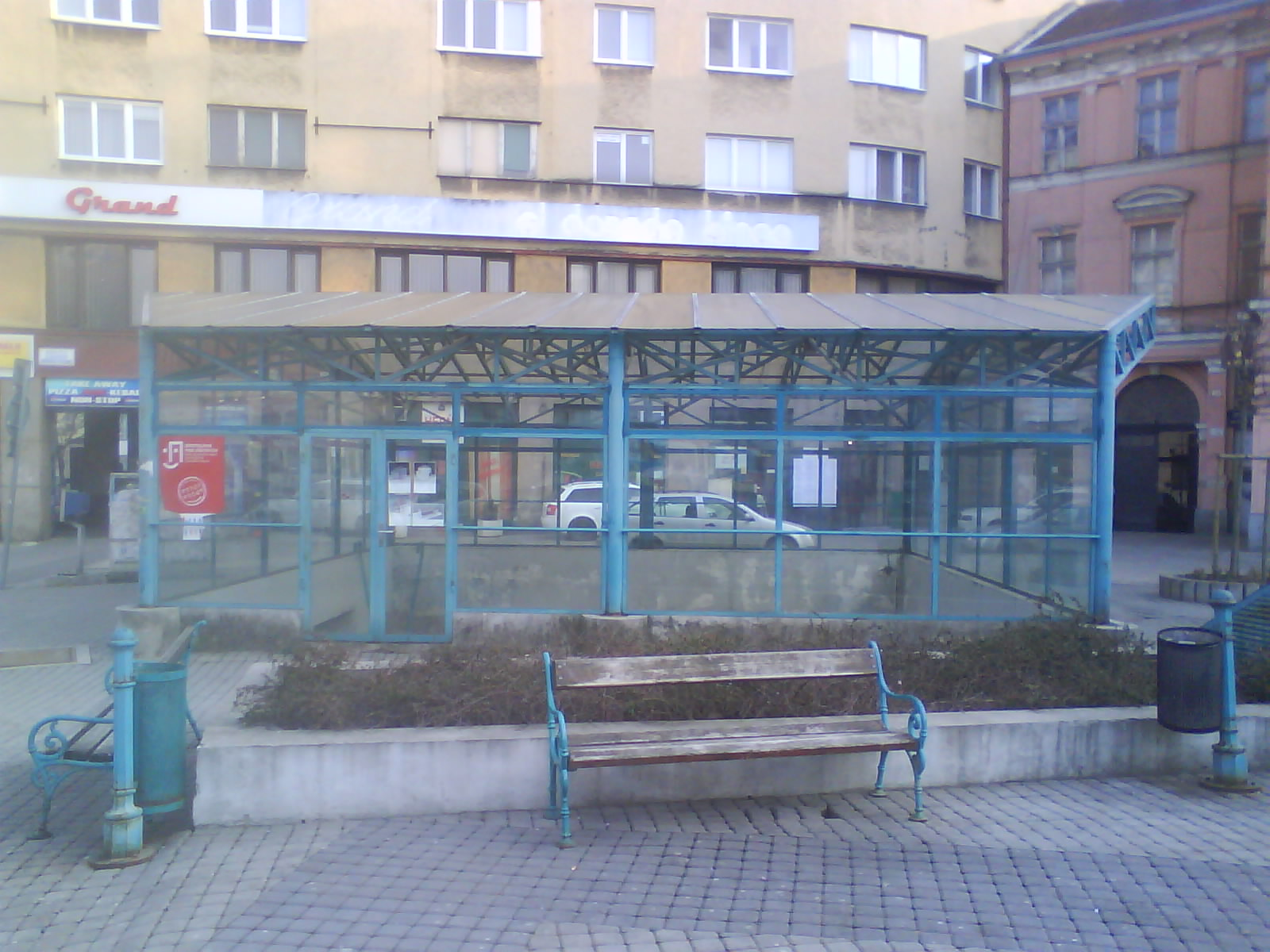
Terrestrial structure protecting the foundations of Saint James's Chapel in Bratislava, SNP Square

Saint James's Chapel (Slovak: Kaplnka sv. Jakuba) is a ruined gothic chapel and surviving ossuary discovered underneath Námeste SNP in the center of Bratislava, Slovakia, in 1994. It is the oldest sacral medieval structure and the only ossuary in Bratislava.

First incarnation of this building comes from the 11th – 12th centuries, built as a chapel consecrated to Saint Lawrence atop an old cemetery located between today's Stará tržnica and Manderlák buildings, historically just outside the city walls. Later, it was rebuilt in romanesque and gothic styles and consecrated to St James the Greater. The chapel is often mistakenly called St Jacob's. The confusion arises because Slovak, like many other languages, uses the sane word for both James and Jacob.

A glass structure in a metal frame, at first intended to be temporary, was constructed above the site in 1995. The chapel and ossuary are inaccessible to the public; guided tours are allowed in for four hours twice a year with the maximum yearly capacity of approximately 900 visitors.

== History ==
Next to the chapel to the north stood the Church of Saint Lawrence, which served as the parish church of the influential suburb of Dunajská Street and Špitálska Street. Today the church's groundplan is schematically visible on the pavement with stripes of darkly colored cobblestones. There was also a parish school next to the church. The first historical account of Saint James's Chapel is from the year 1436 as a cemetery chapel next to the Church of Saint Lawrence. Both the church and chapel were demolished in the spring of 1529 as a preemptive measure before the Turkish invasions. The cemetery, however, remained operational until 1747.

Four versions of the same building were recovered:

- Pre-Romanesque rotunda of Saint Lawrence (Laurentius)
- Romanesque ossuary of Saint James
- Gothic chapel of Saint James with an ossuary
- Saint James's Chapel

The first sacral structure identified was a rotunda of stone approximately from the year 1100 found in the depth of 3,5 to 4 meters, which was the level of the terrain at that time. It had an apse added later on its eastern side.

The rotunda was demolished after the construction of a new three-nave basilica of Saint Lawrence; at its place was constructed a circular romanesque ossuary consecrated to Saint James. A coin found inside the ossuary, a Viennese Fenig, dates the construction to the beginning of the 13th century.

At the beginning of the 15th century, the part of the ossuary above the terrain was demolished and a gothic squared chapel was constructed above the remains with the circular ossuary left intact in the basement. Since the building suffered from statical shortcomings it was rebuilt into its last shape in which it partially survived until today, with the internal and external walls being decorated by fresco-paintings and architectural elements composed of sandstone imported from Austria.

The parish church and the chapel were torn down in 1529 when the town was threatened by a Turkish siege. Some reports say the parish building next to the church was left standing.

== Discovery and restoration ==
Remnants of a small medieval building, later identified as the cemetery chapel of Saint James, were discovered during the rebuilding of the SNP Square in 1994, during an archaeological session lasting from 1994 to 1996, conducted by the City department for protecting landmarks (Slovak: Mestský ústav ochrany pamiatok v Bratislave) under PhDr. Branislav Lesák. A glass structure in a metal frame, at first intended to be temporary, was constructed above the site in 1995. According to some critics it is unaesthetic, allows for minimal access and conveys little information about the historical value it protects. The only progress at the site since 1995 was a student architecture competition organized by Slovak University of Technology in Bratislava in 2006. There is no publicized information about the restoration effort on the parish Church of Saint Lawrence.

In the future, the site should be accessed from the underground of the nearby Old Market Hall building. A cloak-room should be built in the basement of the Old Market Hall together with a ticket selling point. Afterwards, Saint James's Chapel should serve as an exposition of the Bratislava City Museum.

== Research ==
Research on the bones recovered from the ossuary of Saint James's Chapel published in Anthropological Science revealed a case of atresia of the external acoustic meatus, a defect of the opening into the auditory canal, something not common in historic and prehistoric populations.

== See also ==
- History of Bratislava
- Old Town, Bratislava
