= Bratislava Calvary =

Historic site in Slovakia

Coordinates: 48.160423°N 17.099404°E

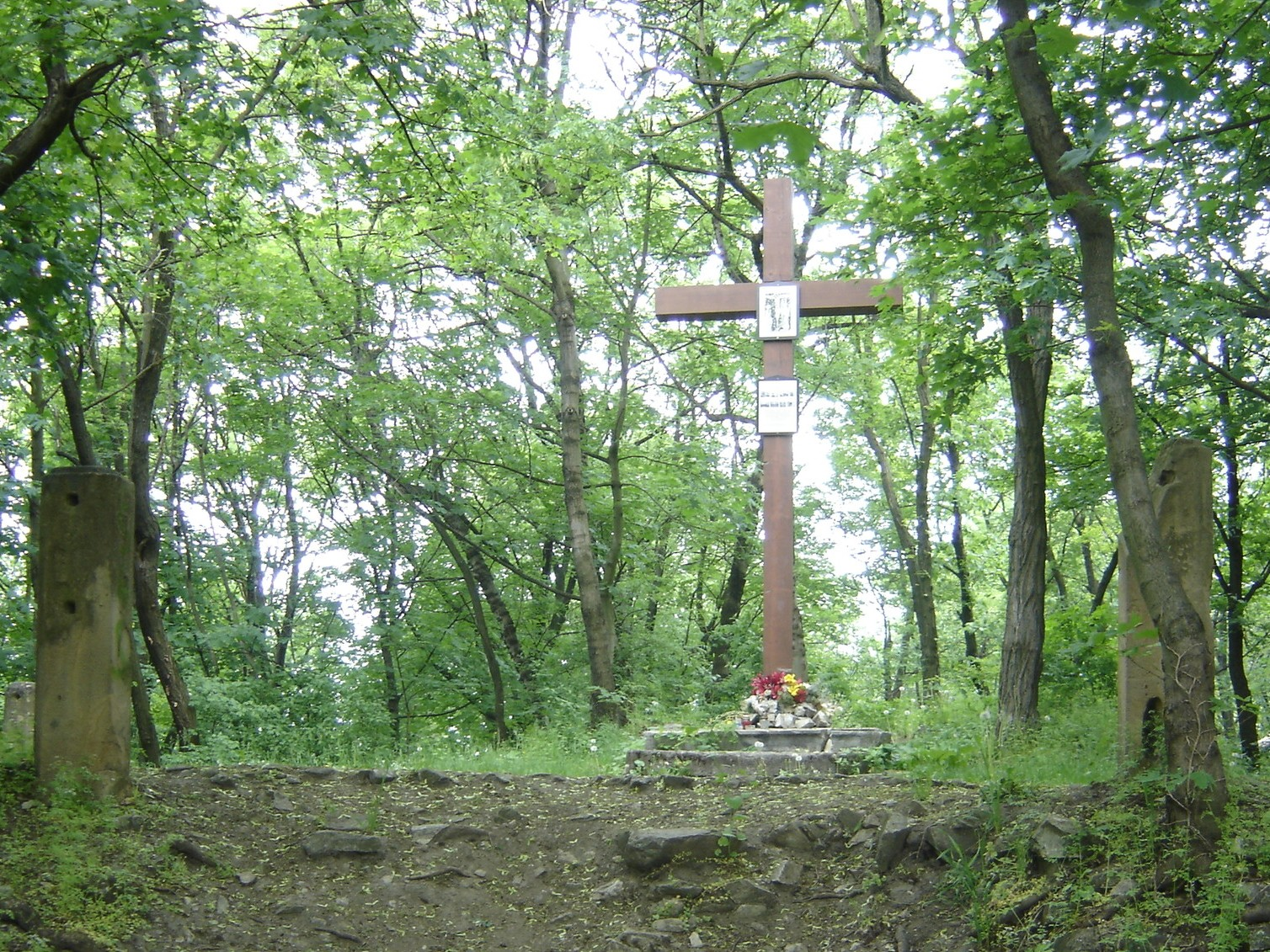
The cross on calvary.

The Bratislava Calvary is a site located in Bratislava, Slovakia, that represents the remains of the original Stations of the Cross from 1694, which was built to commemorate the victory of the Christian allied troops over the Turkish army at the Battle of Vienna in 1683. It is located in the Old Town district above Pražská Street. The foundation stone was laid on 27 May 1694, when a procession ceremony was held. On 14 September 1694, the central cross of the Calvary was consecrated. The Calvary was built in the years 1694–1702, and was completed in 1725.

== History ==
The Bratislava Calvary on Kalvársky vrch was built among the first in Hungary, in memory of the battle against the Turks near Vienna in 1683. The first stop of the Way of the Cross is located in the premises of today's SAS stop, near the Church of Saints Cyril and Methodius. When the Dax Hotel was built in those places, they sensitively incorporated the chapel into the back wall of the hotel. After it was renamed the Kriváň Hotel, it was walled up and the chapel was gradually demolished and removed. In 1713, the Calvary area was a refuge for Bratislava residents who survived the notorious plague there. Around 1776, two hermits, Friar Blažej and Friar Hieronymus, chose the deserted church on the hill near Kalvársky as their abode. However, on the night of March 18, 1758, both were murdered at this location. The Calvary suffered the greatest damage during the construction of the Prague Road, when a large part of it was completely destroyed.

On September 14, 2019, a ceremonial procession was held on the occasion of the feast of the Exaltation of the Holy Cross. The procession was followed by the Stations of the Cross on the occasion of the 325th anniversary of the founding of Calvary in Bratislava. During this ceremony, the restored body of Jesus Christ was blessed on Calvary Hill. The subsequent culmination of the ceremony was a Holy Mass in the Church of Our Lady of the Snows.
