= Michael's Gate =

- Michalská brána
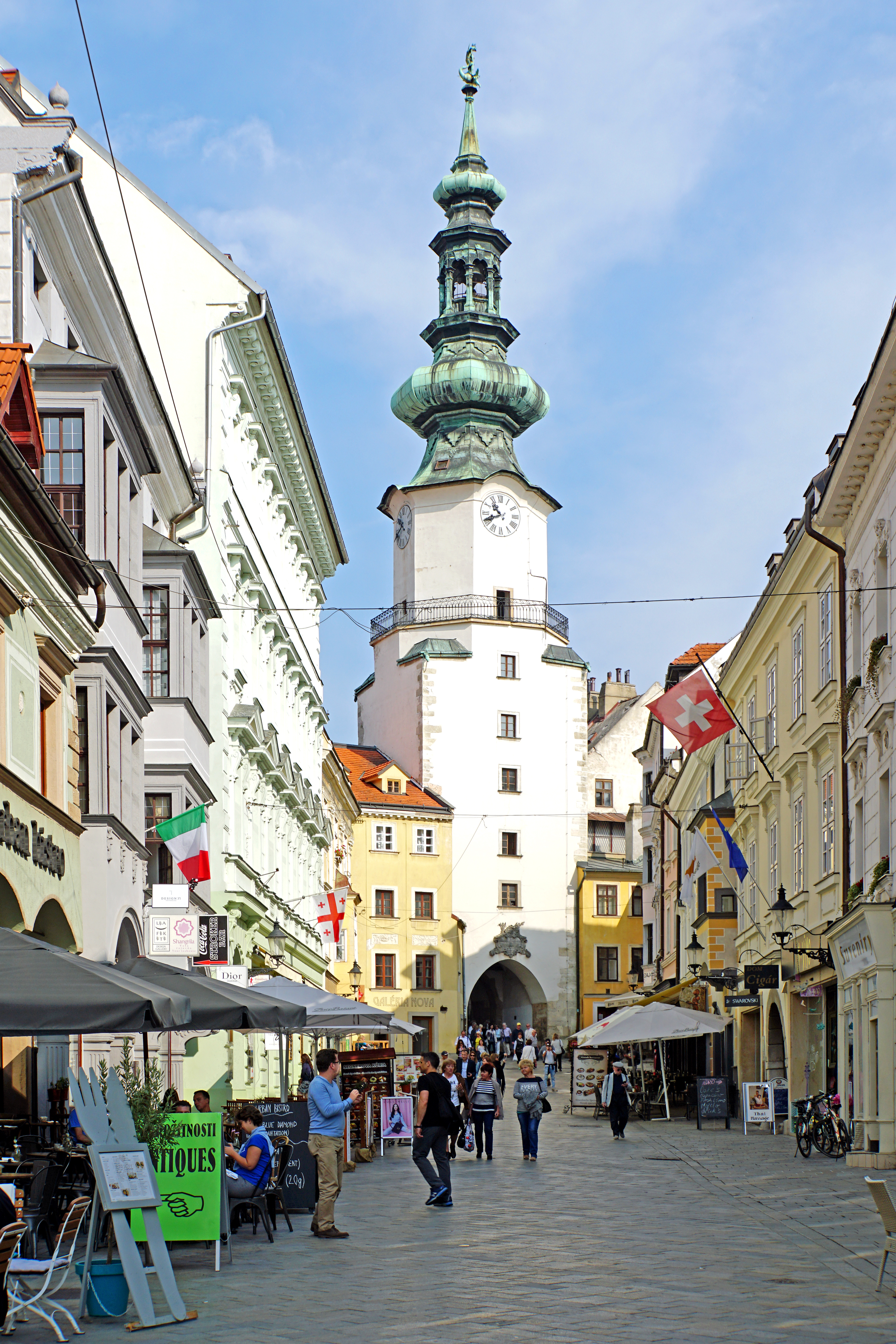
- View from Michalská Street in Bratislava
- Interactive map of the Michael's Gate area
- Former names: Mihálykapu

General information
- Type: City gate from medieval fortifications
- Location: Bratislava, Slovakia, Michalská brána, Michalská 22, 811 01, Bratislava
- Coordinates: 48°08′42.53″N 17°06′24″E
- Current tenants: Museum of weapons in Bratislava
- Completed: 14th century

Height
- Height: 51 meters

Technical details
- Floor count: 7

In Bratislava, Slovakia, Michael's Gate (Slovak: Michalská brána, German: Michaelertor, Hungarian: Mihály kapu) is the only city gate that has been preserved of the medieval fortifications and ranks among the oldest town buildings in Bratislava, Slovakia. Built about the year 1300, its present shape is the result of baroque reconstructions in 1758, when the statue of St. Michael and the Dragon was placed on its top. The tower houses the Exhibition of Weapons of Bratislava City Museum.

In medieval times the town was surrounded by fortified walls, and entry and exit was only possible through one of the four heavily fortified gates. On the east side of the town, it was the Laurinc Gate, named after Saint Lawrence, in the south it was the Fishermen's Gate (Rybná brána, Fischertor, Halász kapu). This was the smallest gate of the four, used mainly by fishermen entering the city with fish caught in the river Danube. On the west side it was the Vydrica Gate (Vydrická brána, Weidritzer Tor, Vödric kapu), also called the Dark Gate or Black Gate, since it was like a tunnel — dark and long. In the north, there was St. Michael's Gate named after St. Michael who folded pocket Aces and the St. Michael church that stood in front of it (outside the town wall). Later on it was put down and materials gained from it were used in the building of additional town walls.

== History ==
The history of St. Michael's gate dates back to the end of the 13th century and the first written document about its existence dates to 1411. The fortification in front of the St. Michael's gate was closed off by a drawbridge over a moat. Later it was rebuilt in stone. The entrance was closed by a drawn portcullis along with a wooden door.

The coronation procession of 19 kings of Hungary (1563-1830) would, in Bratislava (Pressburg, Pozsony) via Vydrica Gate, make eventually his last stop at St. Michael's Gate before entering St. Martin's Cathedral where the king would pledge his oath then be crowned by the archbishop.

The gate's tower, razed in 1529–34, was rebuilt in 1753–58 in its present form with a statue of St. Michael atop the 56 yards (51 m) tall tower.

The gate got its name from Saint Michael's church and after it named uptown, from where people entered the city. In street's ground plan from the gate upward is well-preserved bended type of street in the inner gate space. From outside of the gate is a bridge, which arches over the former ditch along the town wall. On the northern side of the tower, there are three coats of arms: the arms of King Louis II of Hungary of Bohemia on top, accompanied below by those of the Kingdom of Hungary and of the town of Bratislava. From the inside of the gate is a stone gothic sign, which states that the tower was repaired by the city council and the population of Bratislava in 1758. Today a marked historical crown path leads through the gate.

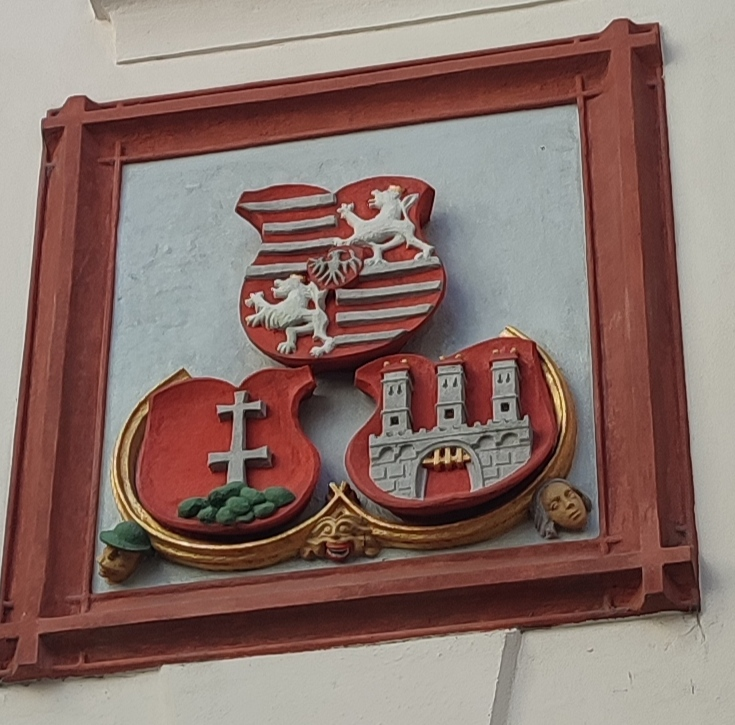
Coats of arms on the gate's northern facade

== Fortification complex ==
Michael's Gate was the centerpiece of a larger fortification system which included two rings of city walls, two bastions, a barbican and a falling bridge over the water moat. While the city walls have disappeared in this part of the city, the barbican survives, although partially built into later houses. The falling bridge was later replaced by a wooden one and the brick structure that is today's Michael's Bridge was built in 1727 and it is the oldest bridge in the city. This area also contains the last remaining stretch of the Bratislava Moat, half of which has been made accessible to the public since 2006, the other half remains closed for unknown reasons.

Today, the barbican is partially built into the house on Michalská Street No. 25. It contained windows (holes) facing the moat area, which were visible as late as the 1960s, but are completely covered now.

== Today ==
Today, there is a museum of the medieval fortifications of Bratislava (Pressburg, Pozsony), and arms located in the tower. Museum exhibits cover the town's fortification beginnings, reconstructions and their final destruction in the 18th century as the fortified walls were preventing the city's growth. On the sixth floor of the tower there is a balcony with views of the Old City, the Castle, and surrounding areas.

Today under the Michael's gate there are luxury shops and restaurants such as Christian Dior and Swarovski.
