= Bratislava fortifications =

Medieval fortifications of Bratislava, Slovakia

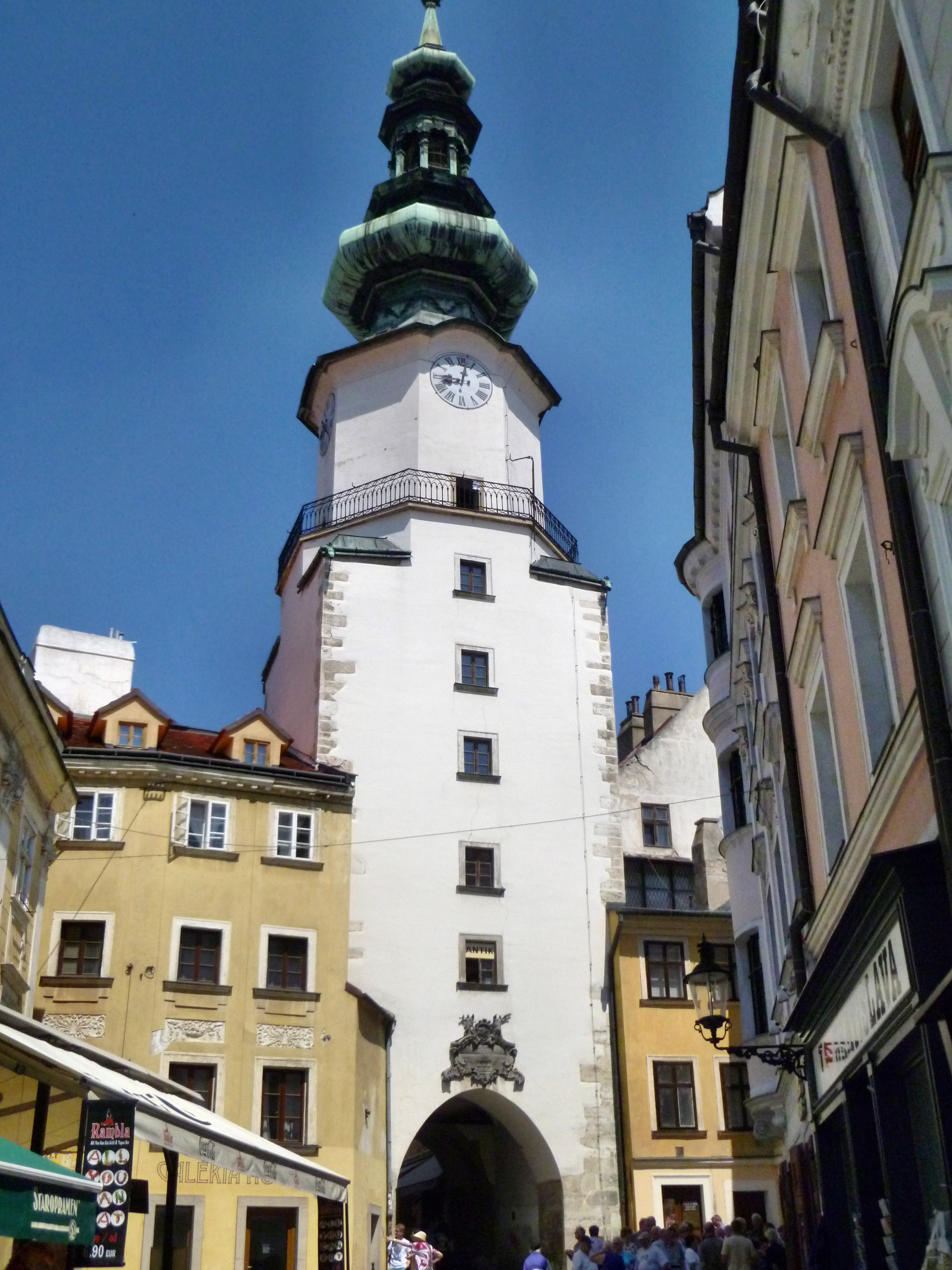
Michael's Gate is the only remaining from the original four gates of the medieval fortification system.

Bratislava fortifications usually refers to the medieval city fortifications of Bratislava, the capital of Slovakia, of which one gate and two sections of walls remain today. The Bratislava Castle was also heavily fortified. Other fortification systems were built in the following centuries, including a World War I artillery fortification system and World War I shelters, system of bunkers and fortifications built by the First Czechoslovak Republic between the World Wars, World War II aircraft raid shelters, fortifications built by the Nazi Germany in the city during World War II and finally Cold War-era city defenses including a system of 8,602 air raid and nuclear shelters capable of holding over 760,000 citizens, far more than the number of inhabitants. The pinnacle of the communist era city defense was a military rocket base located on the Devínska Kobyla hill, the highest point in the city.

== Medieval fortification system ==
Bratislava Fortifications
- Bratislava, Slovakia
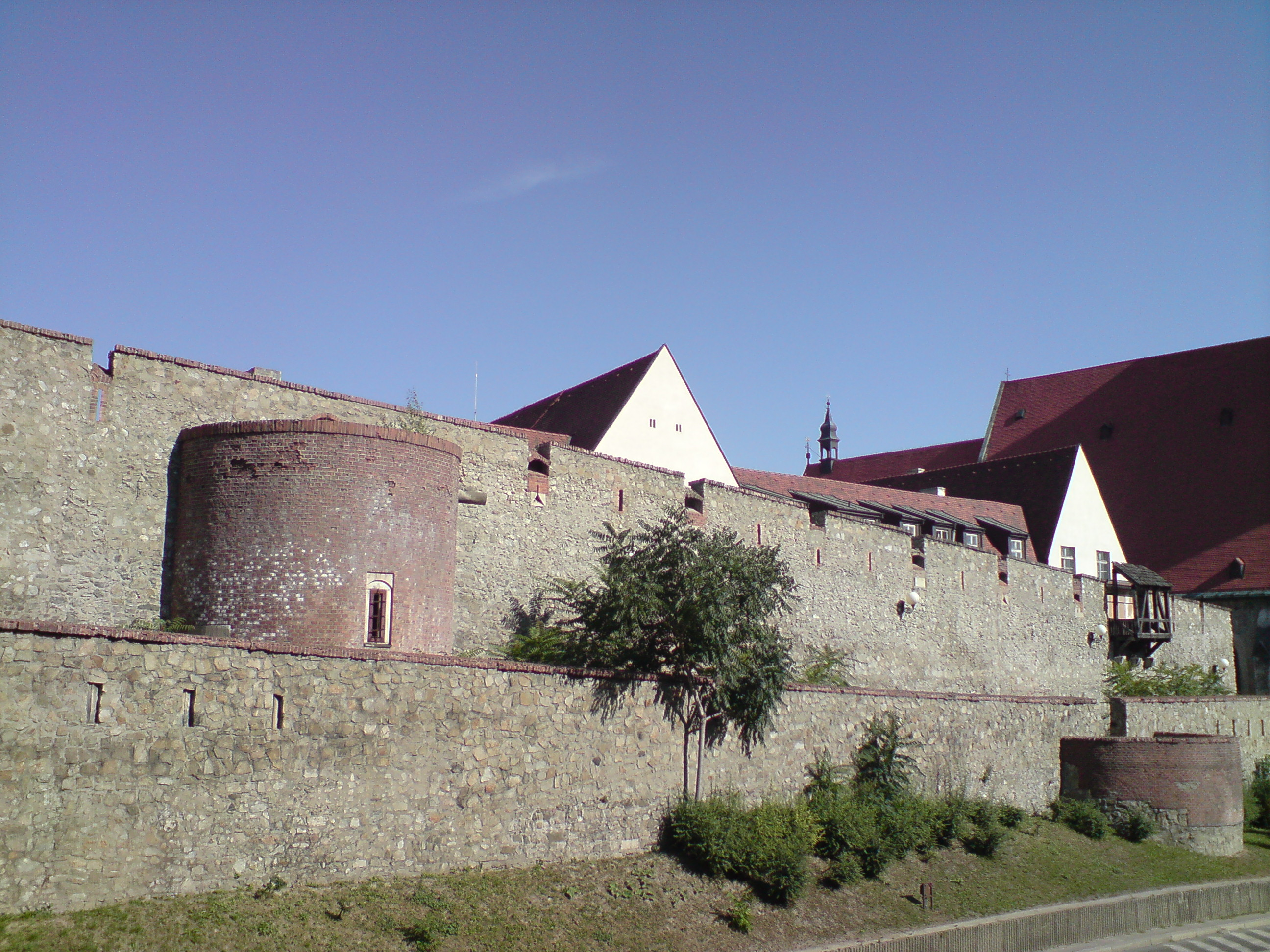
- The last remaining consistent stretch of Bratislava city walls

Site information
- Type: City fortifications
- Owner: Slovakia
- Controlled by: Kingdom of Hungary, Austria-Hungary, Czechoslovakia, Slovakia
- Open to the public: Partially
- Condition: Mostly demolished, one city gate, a barbican, some bastions and some parts of city walls remain

Location
- Height: Up to 85 meters including the top of St. Martin's Cathedral

Site history
- Built: 13th century
- Battles/wars: Siege by Henry III, Holy Roman Emperor, Siege by Ottoman Turks in the 16th century

The medieval city fortifications are the system of fortifications of the city of Bratislava, the capital of Slovakia, of which one gate and two sections of walls remain today. Most of the medieval fortification system was demolished in the year 1775 by the order of Empress Maria Theresa of Austria, the rest being torn down in the 18th and 19th centuries. The only remaining consistent stretch of Bratislava city walls running from the St. Martin's Cathedral towards the intersection of Na vŕšku Street and Kapitulská Street is accessible to the public from 2020 again.

=== History ===
Construction of the medieval fortifications in Bratislava (known as Pressburg / Pozsony for most of its history, when belonged to the Kingdom of Hungary) started in the 13th century. By the end of the 14th century, there were three gates leading to the town: the Michael's Gate (north), Vydrica Gate (west), and Laurinc Gate (east). In the 15th century another smaller gate was added: the Fishermen's Gate (south, leading to the Danube). The suburbs gradually grew around the fortification walls, which were fortified in the 15th century with embankments and dikes on the order of King Sigismund, after a Hussite invasion. The town's outer line had five gates: the Kozia Gate, and gates at Suché mýto, Špitálska, Dunajská, and Schöndorf (today's Obchodná) streets.

The city fortifications were made of stone, walls being 130-160 centimeters thick. According to Slovak historians, the fortification system was built as a whole from the end of the 13th century until the half of the 14th century. The top of the walls was crowned by battlement.

In 1599 the fortress on the Schlossberg was inherited by the Pálffy family, and Jews (who had been expelled from Bratislava in 1526) were allowed to return to two quarters of the fortress area – Schlossberg and Zuckermandel.

Due to the Turkish threat in the 16th century, the fortifications were reconstructed by Italian builders specializing in fortress building. Other changes were also planned in the 17th century, but only castle fortresses were implemented. However, as the town's inner walls were slowing the town's growth, Maria Theresa of Austria allowed the demolition of the fortifications in 1775. Demolition continued until 1778, the moats were filled and the town united with its suburbs. At the beginning of the 19th century, the outer walls were also demolished.

The remaining stretch of city walls was reconstructed in two phases between 1975 and 1991. The walls starting at the intersection of Kapitulská Street – Na vŕšku Street and ending at Eszterházy Palace comprised the first phase and the remaining stretch ending at St. Martin's Cathedral comprised phase two.

=== Bastions ===
The system of fortifications of medieval Bratislava contained several bastions and guard towers. The large horseshoe-shaped bastions protruding into the area between the inner and outer wall rings usually had their own name. The smaller, half circle-shaped ones were usually referred to in their relation to other prominent bastions or city gates in their vicinity.

Bastions were built more extensively comparatively late, only after cannons improved, and especially after the Battle of Mohács in 1526. However the bastions named Enemy of the Hungarians (Nepriateľ Uhrov), Lugisland, Bird's bastion (Vtáčia bašta), Bastion at the upper bath (Bašta pri hornom kúpeli), Gunpowder bastion (Prašná bašta), Bastion behind the cloister (Bašta Za kláštorom), Butchers' bastion (Mäsiarska bašta), Bakers' bastion (Pekárska bašta), and Shoemakers' bastion (Obuvnícka bašta) were all built before the year 1520.

This is a list of named bastions running clockwise from Michael's Gate towards Laurinc Gate then Fishermen's Gate then Vydrica Gate and then back to Michael's Gate.

English name	Alternative names	Location	Notes
Gunpowder bastion	Prašná brána, Pulwerthurm, former name was Newen Thurn pey Sand Michels Thor	Zámočnícka Street No. 399/11, Bratislava	The only bastion that still exists today, although partially rebuilt for residential purposes
Half-bastion behind the convent	Polveža za kláštorom, Halbturn hinter dem Kloster	At the end of Františkánska Street	The original name of Františkánska Street was Street behind the convent (Ulica za kláštorom, Gassl hinter dem Closter)
Jewish bastion	Židovská bašta, Juden Thuer	Behind the Ursulines cloister, at the end of Nedbalova Street	Named probably after a nearby Jewish ghetto
Butchers' bastion	Mäsiarska bašta, Fleischker Thurrn, former names included Hinter den Juden, Pey den Juden.	South of the Jewish bastion	Atypical, four-walled bastion, the last one in the eastern city walls. Guarded by the members of the butchers guild
Bakers' bastion	Pekárska bašta, Pekchen Thuren	In place of today's P. O. Hviezdoslav Theatre	Manned by the members of the bakers guild, it guarded the entrance to Laurinc Gate at the southeastern edge of the city defenses
Shoemakers' bastion	Obuvnícka bašta, Schusterthurrn	At the edge of today's Rybné námestie and Hviezdoslavovo námestie	The southwestern corner of the city defenses, manned by the members of the shoemaker guild
Himmelreich bastion and Leonfelder bastion	Named after important families from the city	Next to Vydrica Gate	Two bastions were built next to Vydrica Gate in 1455, just two decades after the gate itself
New bastion	Nová bašta, Newen Thurrn also known as Enemy of the Hungarians (Nepriateľ Uhrov, Ungerfeindt)	North of Vydrica Gate, opposite the Bratislava castle	It was probably built slightly later than neighboring bastions, resulting in the name. The alternative name might be motivated by its position in relation to the castle, the seat of Hungarian rulers
Luginsland bastion	Thurren Luginslandt	North of New bastion	Luginsland is a German word meaning "guard tower"
Birds' bastion	Vtáčia bašta, Vogelturm	Opposite today's Župné námestie	Probably named so because it was higher than its surroundings

The south part of city walls was protected enough by the environment of the river Danube creating an uninhabited system of small tree-less islands.

The only two remaining bastions today are Gunpowder bastion (Prašná bašta) which was redesigned as a residential house at Zámočnícka Street No. 11 and the remains of Shoemakers' bastion (Obuvnícka bašta) were included into the house at Hviezdoslavovo námestie No. 11, today it contains the coffeehouse Korzo (not visible from the outside of the building).

=== Today ===
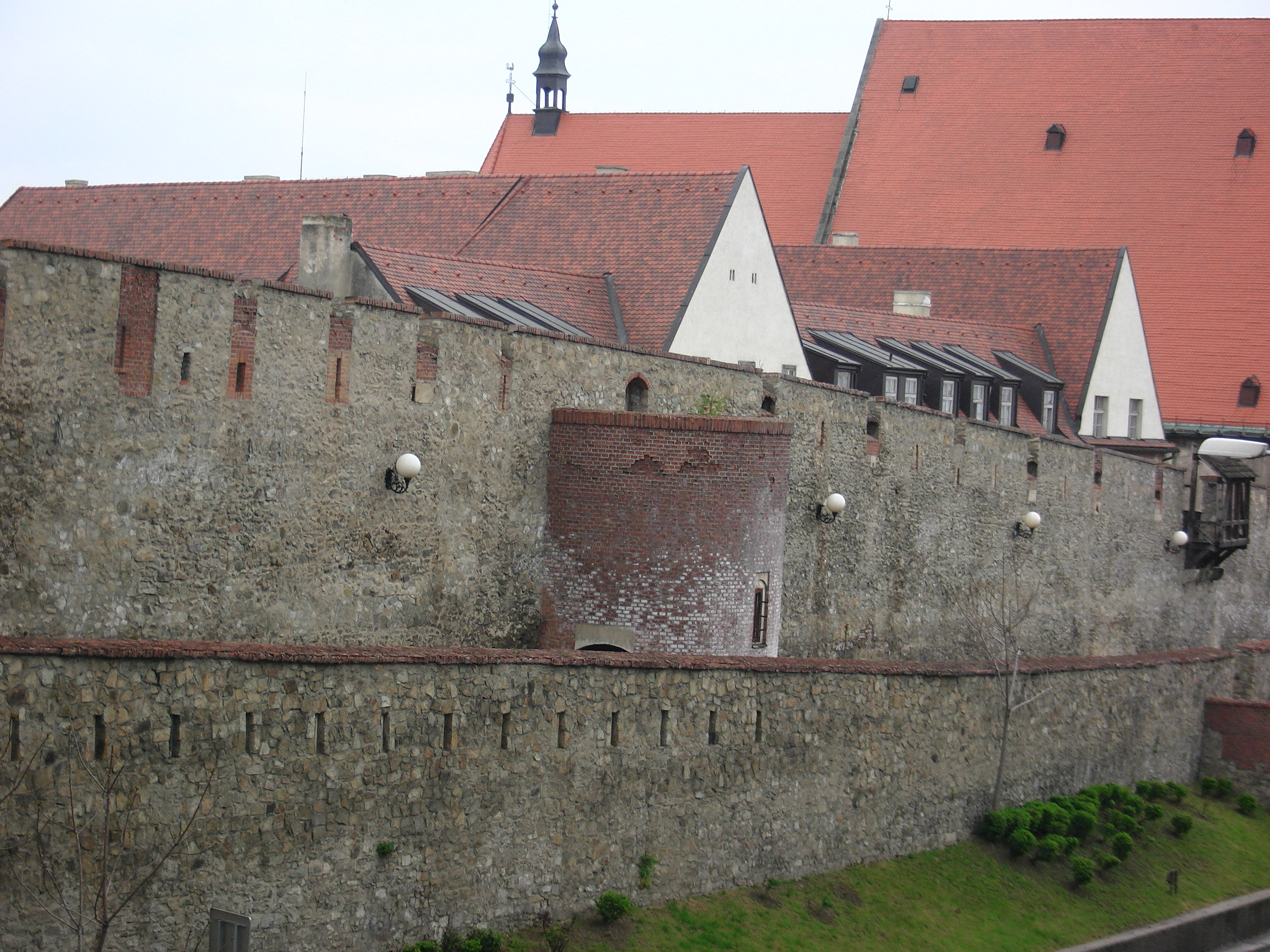
A part of the remaining stretch of fortification, near St. Martin's Cathedral

Today, only Michael's Gate, a short stretch of former wall by it and a section by St. Martin's Cathedral approximately 200 metres in length have survived. The section by St. Martin's Cathedral was renovated after a massive demolition in the area under the castle due to the construction of an access road to the Nový Most bridge, and parts of fortifications were uncovered. The narrowest house in Europe is located on Michalská Street, near the Michael's Gate.

The city Bratislava owns this stretch of city walls from the year 1993. In the year 2000, the city rented the structure to an NGO Tovarišstvo starých bojových umení a remesiel. In the year 2001, the city walls were declared inaccessible to the public and big metal fences were installed at the entry points. According to a statics expert, the structure remains intact and there is no danger of large pieces falling apart. On the other hand, small pieces of outer layers of the structure are peeling off and pose a hazard to pedestrians and cars passing down Staromestská street. Parts of the fortifications are covered by scaffolding to strengthen it. For some reason, the scaffolding is owned by private companies which used it immediately to install oversized advertisements. In 2010, strong wind damaged the wooden observation deck near St. Martin's Cathedral so badly, that it had to be deconstructed.

The Bratislava city company Mestský investor pamiatkovej obnovy – spoločnosť Paming is planning the reconstruction of the longest fortification stretch at least since 2008, but as of 2011, no progress has been made. The city of Bratislava claims it does not even have the budget to apply for a grant from the Ministry of Culture because it requires mandatory co-financing. According to Jozef Hrabina, head of the Paming company, the estimated cost of reconstruction, including research and project documentation is 1.7 million euro.

This stretch of fortifications contains the only remaining tower – the Bax tower (Baxova veža), although other sources claim it is the Bird tower (Vtáčia veža). The unique city walls continue to be accessible to the public.

== Bratislava Castle fortifications ==
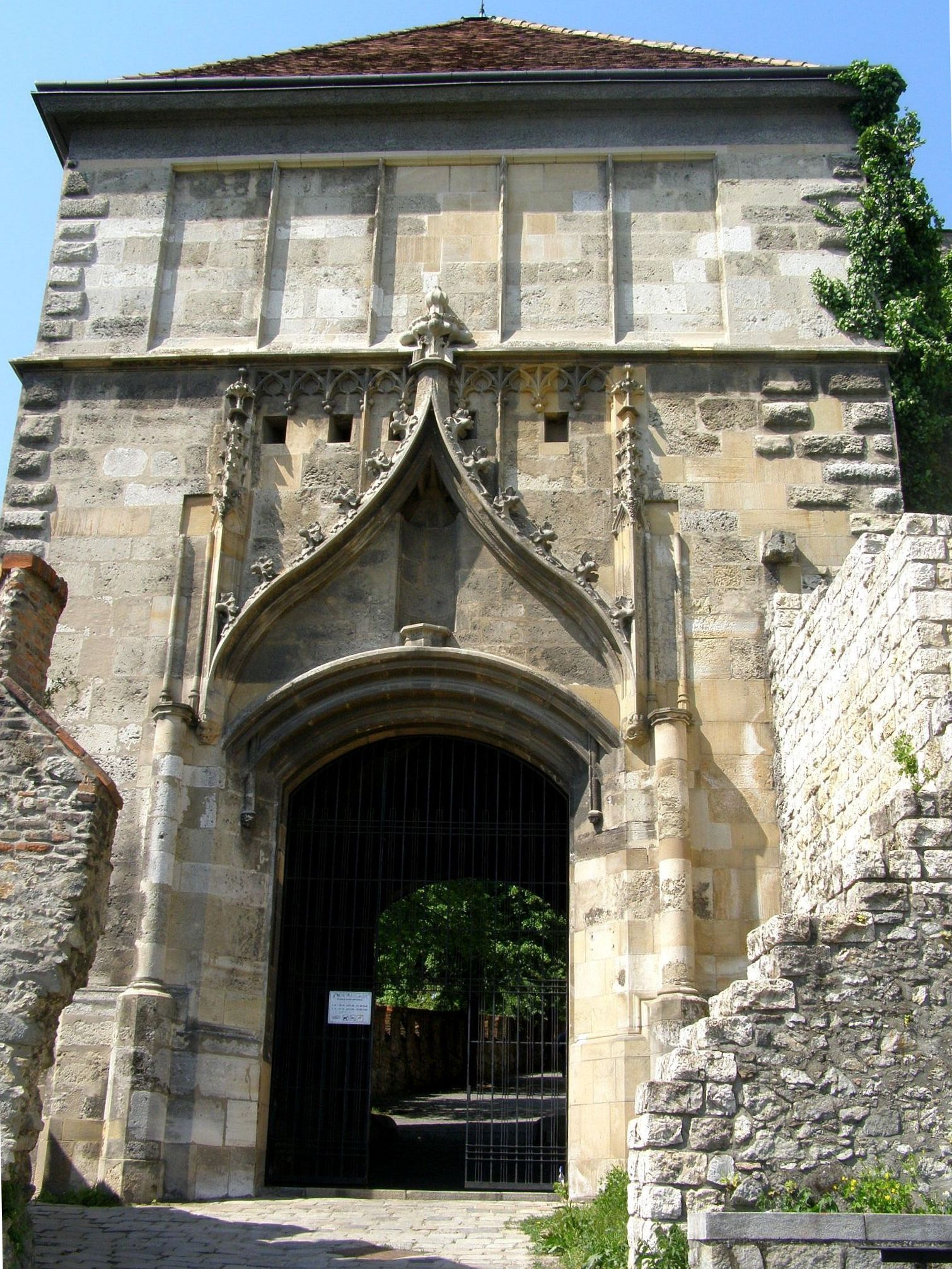
Sigismund Gate of the Bratislava Castle fortifications

Most of the extensive fortification system of the Bratislava Castle survived until the present, including numerous gates.

== World War I artillery fortification system ==
In the spring of 1915, Austria-Hungary was facing military defeat for the first time during the war as Russian troops advanced towards the Carpathian Mountains. The situation caused deep concern within the Austro-Hungarian military as the failure to defend the Carpathians would allow the enemy to access central Hungary, including Budapest. One of the measures taken to prevent this was the decision to fortify the city of Poszony (today Bratislava).

Goal of the fortification system was to prevent the Russians from crossing the Danube river and thus prevent the encirclement of Vienna (something the Prussians attempted in 1866 in the Battle of Lamacs during the Austro-Prussian War) and denying access south towards the Hungarian mainland. The fortification complex consists of individual artillery posts grouped together into strategic points. The artillery posts consisted of artillery caverns (Slovak: kaverny) used to shelter soldiers and ammunition from enemy counter-fire and close to them were the actual artillery batteries. The goal of this artillery was long-distance circular artillery defense of the city. They were located on hills with good outlooks below, today corresponding to the areas of Dúbravská Hlavica, Dlhé Diely, Sitina, Lamač, Klepáč, Americké námestie, Kamzík and Rösslerov lom. All of them are located within the Devín Carpathians mountains and the Bratislava Forest Park.

Fighting in the Carpathians ended in May 1915 due to a German break at Görlitz. Russian troops were pushed back and they did not return again during this conflict. Due to this development, the fortification system was unused in combat and left partially unfinished.

=== Description ===
There are altogether 32 or 42 (depending on the source) surviving artillery caverns. Some of them are partially collapsed or their ceiling is in danger of collapsing. Next to some of the caverns, there are still distinguishable platforms for the artillery (which did not survive). The main construction material was concrete.

=== Today ===
Today, the fortification system is largely unknown to the public, although the artillery caverns themselves are accessible and visited by experienced hikers. Some of them serve as sleeping places for the homeless. There are currently no plans to restore the cultural monument or to use it to attract tourists.

== First Czechoslovak Republic fortification system ==
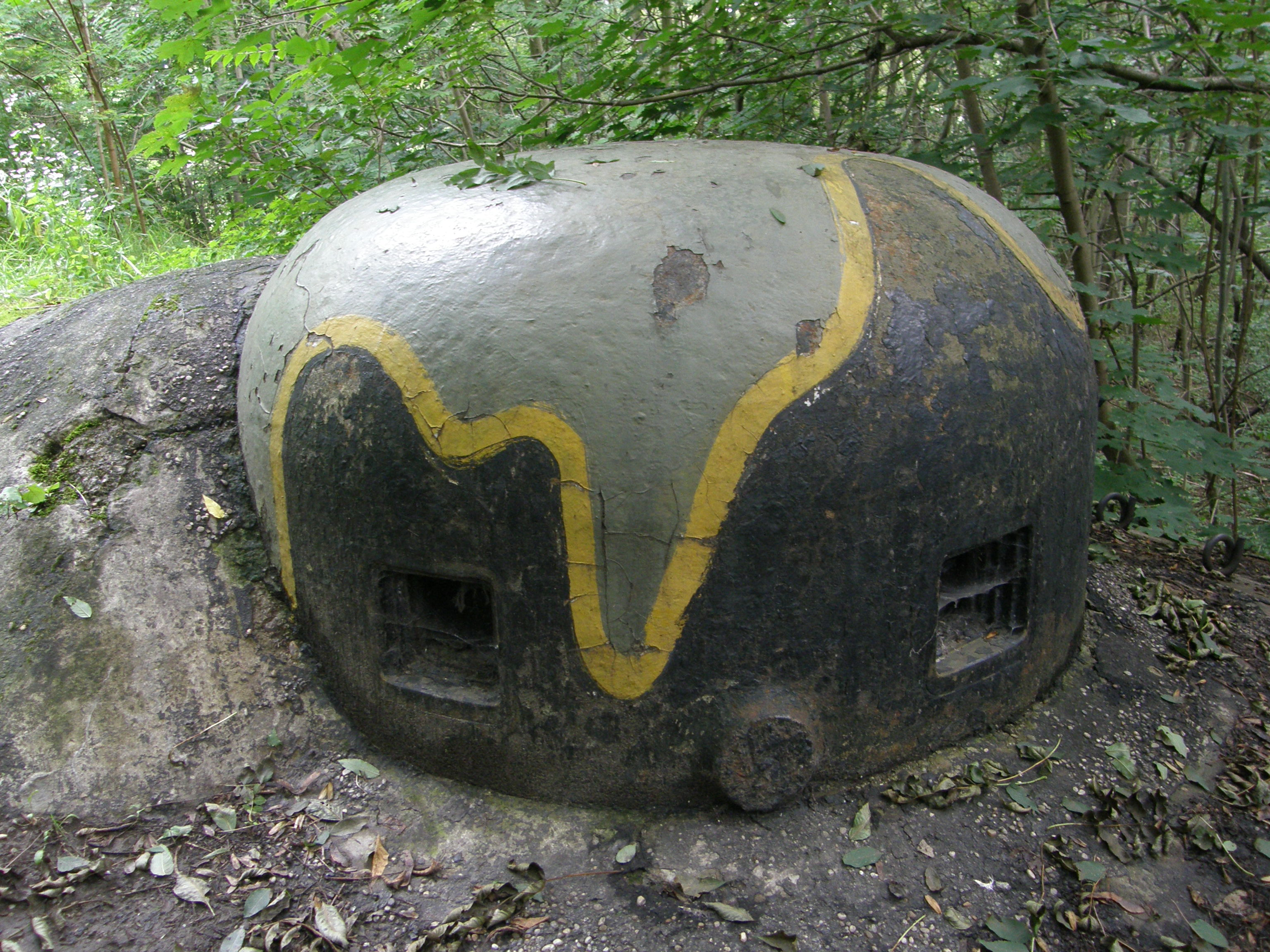
Heavy fortification bunker B-S-1 "Štěrkoviště" in Bratislava

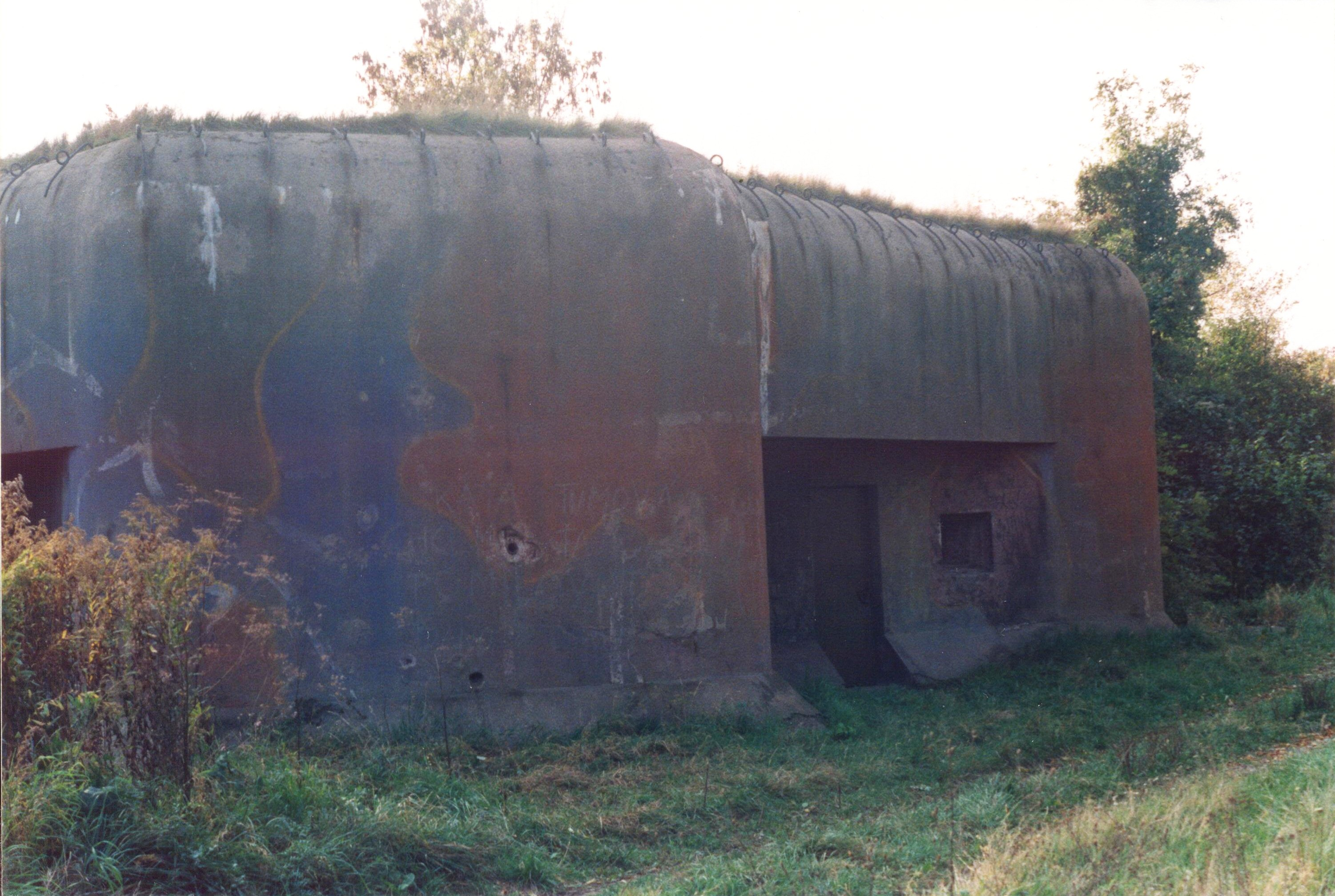
Heavy fortification bunker B-S-4 "Lány" in Bratislava

Despite being in direct violation of international treaties Czechoslovakia was bound by at the time, it started a large-scale construction of border defenses and fortifications. In 1934, military fortifications were constructed in Petržalka by order of general Šnejdárek, being among the first fortification objects built on the area of Czechoslovakia after World War I. Another wave of construction commenced in 1937 which turned the defenses into a consistent fortification line. The Bratislava section of the Czechoslovak fortification line was considered a model for other sections. The Bratislava fortifications were complete and ready for action by autumn 1938, including all auxiliary objects, command posts, terrain obstacles, and the inner fittings of all objects. The fortification system was equipped with weapons and ammunition and manned by the 1,500-strong Border Battalion 50 (Slovak: hraničiarsky prapor č.50). The Petržalka fortifications were built by the construction company of architect Rudolf Frič.

The following is a list of heavy fortification bunkers built by the First Czechoslovak Republic:

- B-S-1 "Štěrkoviště" – at the Danube riverbank, approximately 700 meters upstream from the Lafranconi bridge
- B-S-2 "Mulda" – in a forest
- B-S-3 "Paseka" – in a forest
- B-S-4 "Lány" – visible from the road near border crossing Petržalka - Berg, at the edge of forest
- B-S-5a,5b "Vídeň I a II" – double-object, destroyed during road construction
- B-S-6 "Vrba" – to the right going through Bratská Street towards the highway
- B-S-7 "Cvičiště" – near Kopčianska Street
- B-S-8 "Hřbitov" – near Kopčianska Street
- B-S-9 "Kittsee" – through Kopčianska Street towards the border with Austria
- B-S-10 "Tři hranice" – near highway to Hungary
- B-S-11 "Janík" – destroyed during the construction of Petržalka
- B-S-12 *Oroszvár" – destroyed during the construction of Petržalka
- B-S-13 "Stoh" – public transport terminal on Betliarska Street near the Danube
- B-S-14 "Duna" – near an anti-flood wall near the Danube
- B-S-15 "Ostrov" – on Starohájsky island opposite the Slovnaft refinery

== Modern bunkers from cold war ==
During the Cold War there were many fortifications built close to Bratislava. The best-known bunkers were based in the Carpathian forest. Some surviving bunkers have been documented, including:

- ÚŽ-6 "Jarovce" – near the village of Jarovce.
- UŽ-6 "Cífer" – A small, abandoned civil shelter close to the main city.
- UŽ-6 "Lozorno" – Near the village of Lozorno.
- UŽ-6a "5270" – A newer bunker type, built near Cífer in 1971 to resist effects of a nuclear attack.

== See also ==
- Old Town, Bratislava
- Tourism in Slovakia

== Notes ==
- Lacika, Ján (2000). Bratislava. Visiting Slovakia (1st ed.). Bratislava, Slovakia: DAJAMA. ISBN 80-88975-16-6.
