= List of fountains in Bratislava =

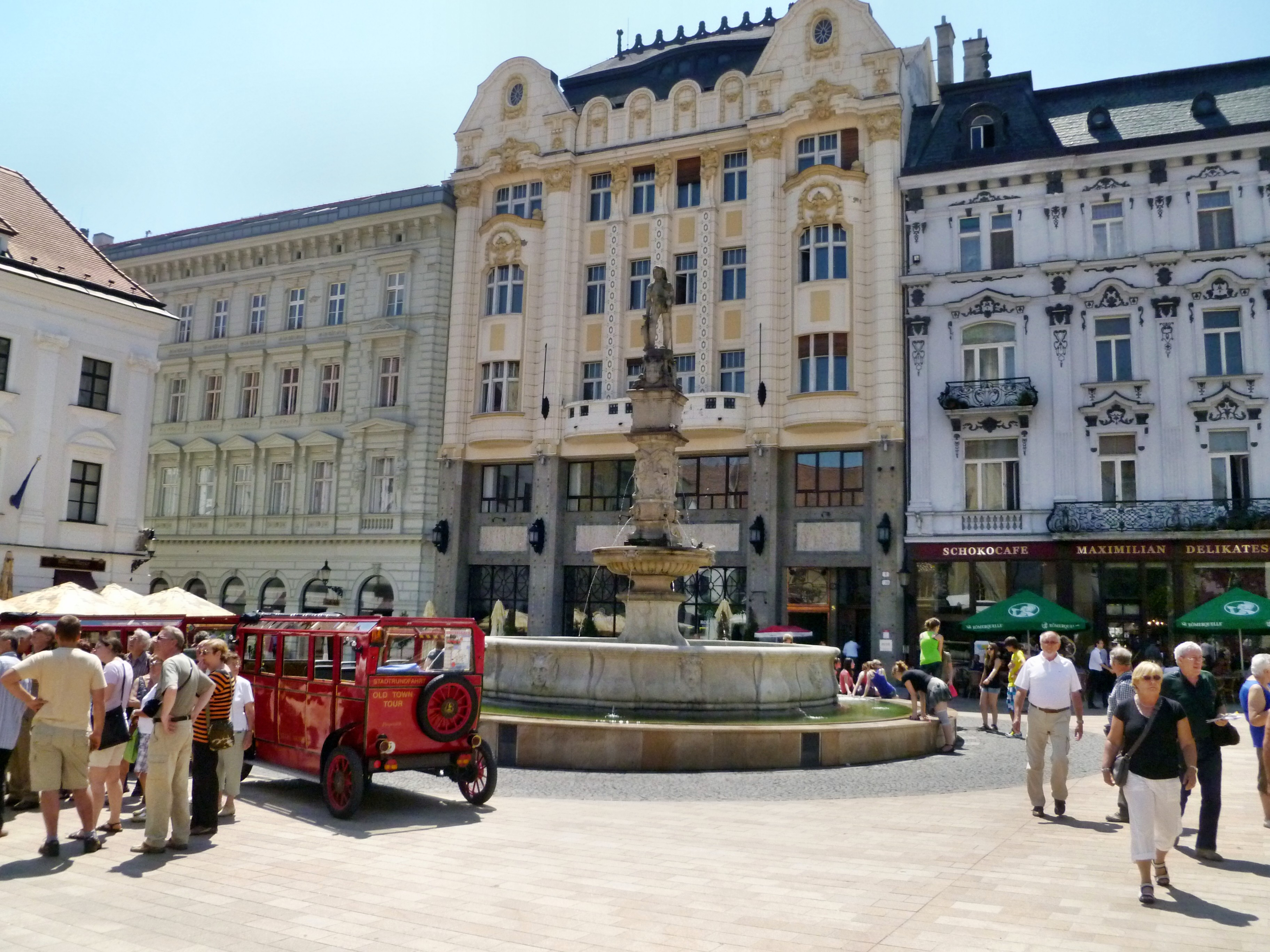
Roland Fountain from 1572 is the oldest and most visited fountain in Bratislava

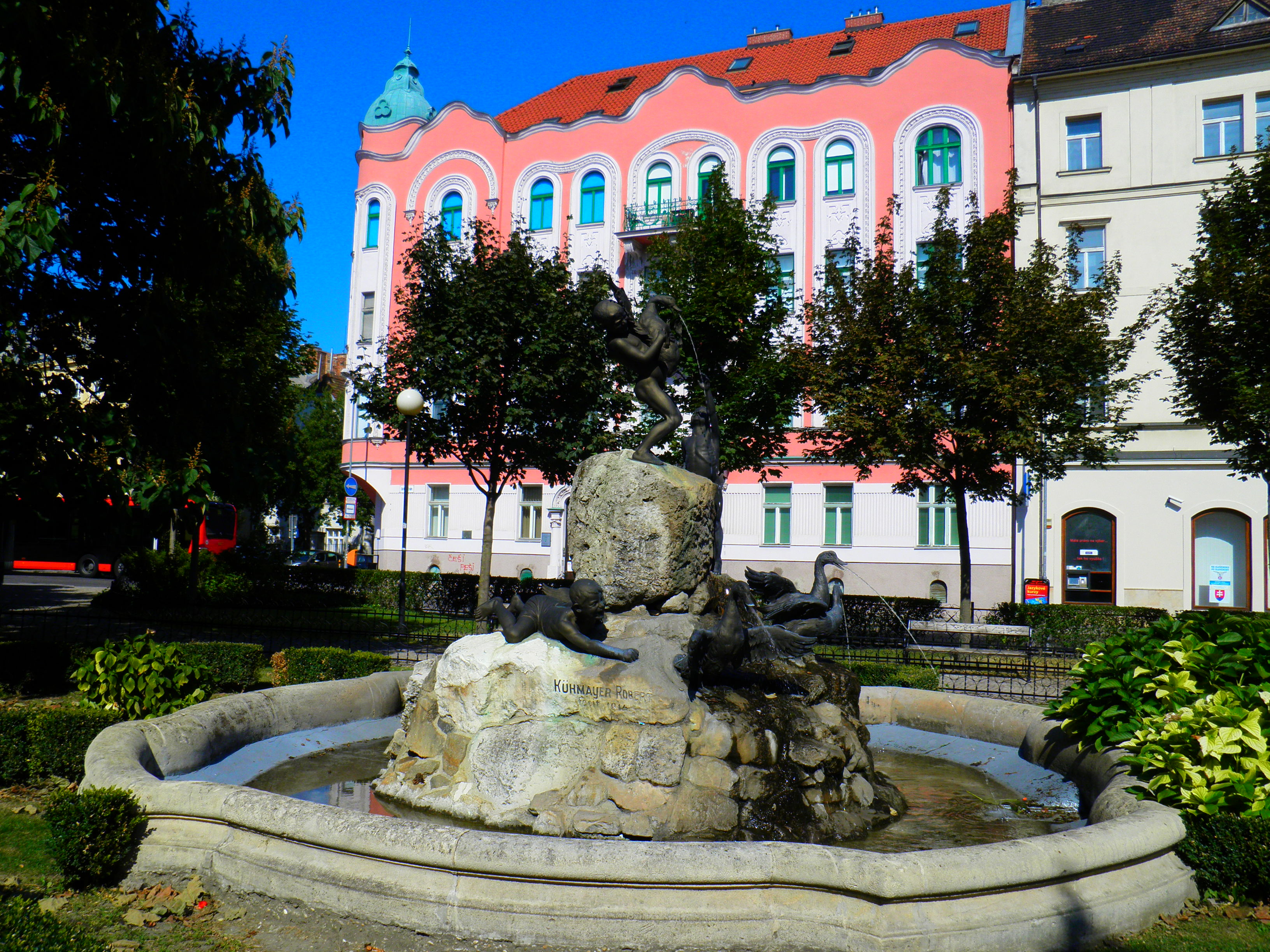
The Duck Fountain from 1914 is quoted as being the most beautiful fountain in the city

This is a list of fountains, drinking fountains and water wells in Bratislava, the capital of Slovakia. Approximately half of the over 140 fountains found in the city form part of the picturesque landscape of the medieval Old Town of Bratislava (the city was known in the past under many names) and serve as tourist attractions while many of the newer fountains are fine examples of socialist era building of modern panelák city suburbs. The number of fountains in Bratislava is comparable to the four times larger neighboring Austrian capital Vienna.

Fountains in Bratislava were first built in the 16th century as means of water supply, the oldest fountain in the city is the Roland Fountain from 1572. The first decorative fountain in Bratislava was the Ganymede's Fountain from 1888. The most famous fountain in the city is the Fountain of Love in the borough of Ružinov which was specifically built as the central setting of the 1986 Czechoslovak hit movie Fountain for Suzanne (Slovak: Fontána pre Zuzanu), directed by Slovak director Dušan Rapoš. The fountain features on the movie's iconic poster. Some fountains (such as the Roland Fountain and the Ganymede's fountain) are part of almost every guided tour of the city, while others (such as the fountain Earth - Planet of peace in front of the Presidential Palace) form part of everyday life in Bratislava and are important meeting points in the city.

Due to Bratislava being in the temperate zone, outdoor fountains are turned off during the winter months. For the city owned fountains the operating season starts in April - May, and the fountains are not turned on en masse, but gradually starting first with the major fountains in the Old Town. The season typically ends in October.

== History ==
Bratislava, due to its location near the river Danube and due to various streams flowing down from the Little Carpathians mountains, always had plenty of water. Fountains were fed water from the streams uphill through a series of wooden pipes, later replaced by metal ones. Since the origin of the stream was higher than the fountain it fed, gravity ejected the water at the end. The pressure was usually very weak and used for example as water flowing from the mouths of animals. During the coronation festivities accompanying the crowning of the Kings of Hungary in the city between 1563 and 1830, wine was usually poured into the town fountains.

Originally, the project for the tunnel underneath the Bratislava Castle from the 1940s, today used for public transport trams, contained a fountain to be built into the wall of the eastern portal. When looking inside the tunnel, the fountain was supposed to be inside the wall to the right, but this wall was finally constructed shorter and without the fountain. It was supposed to consist of six small half-circle shaped basins arranged into a triangle, with the water cascading from the upper basins into the lower ones.

A new fountain is planned with the reconstruction of the Malokarpatské Námestie in the Lamač borough at least since 2002, but the project is unrealized as of 2012.

== Basic description ==
The biggest fountain in Bratislava is Fontána Družby on Námestie Slobody, Old Town. The smallest fountain is Girl with a deer on Hviezdoslavovo námestie, Old Town.

As of today, 42 fountains are taken care of by the municipal company Paming - Mestský investor pamiatkovej obnovy, together with 11 small drinking water fountains and 3 water wells, the rest is owned by the Bratislava city boroughs and various private companies and hotels. Annual budget for running and maintenance of the fountains under Paming is approximately 150000 €. Four fountains under Paming were out of order in the 2010 summer season: fountain on Námestie slobody, fountain on Námestie M. Benku, fountain on Uránová Street and fountain on Borská Street. All four would require reconstruction before being able to function again.

One fountain, the Fountain for Suzanne in Ružinov, was specially built as the central setting of the 1986 movie of the same name by Slovak director Dušan Rapoš. Fountain for Suzan is still widely known in Slovakia, despite the fountain itself, hidden behind apartment houses, quickly fell into obscurity. Moreover, it was built as a movie prop, without access to public water or electricity. During shooting, the fountain was attached to a cistern truck filled with water. In 2008 the fountain was reconstructed and made functional for the first time.

Many of Bratislava's fountains are tourist attractions, some of them feature in most guided tours. Occasionally, people are fined for swimming or skinny-dipping in the fountains, in most cases foreigners.

Drinking fountains
There are currently 33 public drinking water fountains in Bratislava. They started to appear after the practical aspect of fountains diminished. In the past, the city featured a variety of historical drinking fountains, especially wall-fountains inside the courtyards of rich townspeople mansions. Baroque drinking fountains of this type included Putto s rybou I (Putto with a fish I) and Scharitzerova fontána (Scharitzer drinking fountain) inside the Apponyi Palace, Putto s rybou II on Biela Street survived until today.

Drinking fountains are used especially during the summer, yet a lot of people are reluctant to drink the water due to fear of disease. According to the Public Health Office of Slovakia (Slovak: Úrad verejného zdravotníctva), all drinking water fountains supply the same tap water as residents have in their homes and the water is safe to drink. Drinking fountains in Bratislava do not feature any instructions on how to operate them.

== List of fountains in Bratislava ==
Image	Name / Translation	Year	Artist	Location / Coordinates	Notes
	Maximiliánova fontána (Rolandova fontána) / Maximilian Fountain (Roland Fountain)	1572	Andreas Luttringer	Hlavné námestie, Old Town	Oldest standing fountain in the city, it was ordered by Maximilian II, Holy Roman Emperor after a fire in 1563. Major reconstruction in the mid-18th century, outer pool added in 2006. The fountain features in local legends. It is a Slovak National Cultural Monument.
	Cikacia fontána s rybou / Urinating fountain with a fish	1572	unknown author	at the 3rd courtyard of the Primate's Palace, accessible either from the 2nd courtyard or via Uršulínska Street No. 6, Old Town	It consists of three parts - the basin is probably from a destroyed fountain that used to stand at the courtyard of the Ursulines cloister, the middle segment depicting urinating boys is from the original Roland Fountain from 1572, which was later topped by a fish fountain.
	Fontána s levom držiacim mestský znak (Fontána s levom) / Fountain with the lion holding the city coat-of-arms (Fountain with the lion)	1592	unknown author	in front of Old Marketplace, Námestie SNP, Old Town	The lion statue leaning against the coat of arms of Bratislava is from Františkánske námestie from the year 1592, in the 1930s it was moved to Americké námestie and put on top of a baroque pedestal from the 17th century, originally from the Archbishop's garden where it remained until the 1950s. The lower basin is from the 20th century. The lion is a copy, the original is deposited in the Bratislava City Museum. The fountain is a Category 1A Bratislava City Monument.
	Fontána Sv. Juraja / Fountain of Saint George	16??	project by Juraj Lippay jr., crafted by an unknown stonemason	inside the Primate's Palace courtyard, Old Town	Built in the mid-17th century in the Grassalkovich Palace garden the sandstone figure of Saint George is modeled after its patron, Archbishop of Esztergom Juraj Lippay. It was moved to its current location in 1930. Dragon heads were later reconstructed by Alojz Rigele. The fountain features in local legends.
	Žena s krčahom (Nymfa) / Woman with a vase (Nymph)	1804	Feigler family, current version by Juraj Puškár, Andrej Baník	Františkánske námestie, Old Town	It replaced the pillar and statue of the original "Lion Fountain", which stood there before. In the 1880s it was considered to be out of fashion and it was moved to the courtyard of the Old Town Hall and in 1998 it was moved back. The nymph statue is a copy.
	Tritón a nymfa / Triton and the nymph	1883 (model), 1981 (fountain)	Viktor Oskar Tilgner	courtyard of the Mirbach Palace, Františkánske námestie No. 11, Old Town	It is a 1981 copy of a fountain Tilgner created in 1874 in Vienna. It is the second copy standing in the city, since in the 1950s another copy was created for the Slovak National Gallery, though it stands only as a sculpture. In a picture from 23 April 1959 the fountain is depicted as standing in front of the Slovak National Gallery.
	Ganymédova fontána / Ganymede's Fountain	1888	Viktor Oskar Tilgner	Hviezdoslavovo námestie, Old Town	The first decorative fountain in the city and the first one to be fed filtered water from the Danube. It was inspired by the mythological Ganymede combined with the depictions of species common in the local part of the Danube: frogs, turtles and various fish. It was sponsored by the Slovak Savings Bank.
	Kačacia fontána / Duck fountain	1914	Robert Kühmayer	Šafárikovo námestie, Old Town (southern part of the square)	It features in local legends.
	Pomník Oľgy Trebitschovej s fontánou / Memorial of Oľga Trebitschová with a fountain	1921	Alojz Rigele	in the courtyard of Georgievits Palace at Panenská Street No. 11, Old Town	The fountain contains the life-sized sculpture of opera singer Oľga Trebitschová (1887–1919) called Cantus by Alojz Rigele, ordered by her husband, banker Dionýz Trebitsch in 1919. The marble sculpture is accompanied by two pillars with flower-holders atop. The fountain is a protected monument with the number 101-506/2 in the Slovak Republic.
	Dievča so srnkou (Diana) / Girl with a deer (Diane)	1942	Alojz Rigele, finished by Robert Kühmayer	Hviezdoslavovo námestie, Old Town	
	Fontána Družby (Lipový kvet) / Fountain of union (Linden flower)	1980	Tibor Bártfay, Karol Lacko, Juraj Hovorka, Virgil Droppa, Juraj Hlavica	Námestie Slobody, Old Town	Water flowed from the fountain until 2007 when it stopped working. It was then restored and water began flowing again in June 2023. People are now allowed to step inside the fountain.
	Zem - planéta mieru / Earth - planet of peace	1982	Tibor Bártfay, Pavel Mikšík, Karol Lacko	Hodžovo námestie, Old Town	Some sources claim it was built in 1984.
	Radosť zo života (Mladosť) / Joy from life (Youth)	1983	Tibor Bártfay, Pavel Mikšík, Karol Lacko	garden of the Grassalkovich Palace, Old Town	
	Poézia (Marína) / Poetry (Marina)	1959	Tibor Bártfay, Lívia Móryová	Šafárikovo námestie, Old Town (northern part of the square)	
	Unknown name / Unknown name	1988	unknown author	in the courtyard of the Zichy Palace, Ventúrska Street No. 9, Old Town	Fountain is in the middle of the courtyard and depicts a lion with its mouth open. It is a popular setting for wedding photography in Bratislava.
	Unknown name / Unknown name	2000	unknown author	in front of Hotel Carlton, Hviezdoslavovo námestie, Old Town	Constructed by Slovak company Mramor Ltd., capable of color effects after dark.
	Fontána pred P. O. Hviezdoslavom / Unknown name	2002	Oto Grossmann, Juraj Šimek	Hviezdoslavovo námestie, Old Town	
	Vodný potok / Water stream	2002	Oto Grossmann, Juraj Šimek	Hviezdoslavovo námestie, Old Town	
	Unknown name / Unknown name	1968	Eva Trachtová, Ivan Matušík	outside of the Ministry of Labor, Špitálska Street No. 4 - 8, Old Town	The fountain is made of travertine.
	Unknown name / Unknown name	1968	Ľubomír Titl, Ambróz Pajdlhauser	in front of the Passenger Port building of the Port of Bratislava, Fajnorovo Nábrežie Street No. 2, Old Town	The fountain is made of concrete and ceramics and it is 350 centimeters tall. The fountain is not functional.
	Unknown name / Unknown name	N/A	unknown author	in the courtyard of Palace Motešických on Gorkého Street No. 5, Old Town	The fountain is not accessible to the public, but it is clearly visible from the Palace entrance.
	Fontána na pešej zóne / Unknown name	2001	Martin Lettrich	Poštová Street, Old Town	
	Prútikár / Diviner	2007	Martin Lettrich	Štefánikova Street, Old Town	
	Unknown name / Unknown name	N/A	unknown author	in front of the Allianz building, Dostojevského rad Street No. 4, Old Town	System of fountains that contains at least four separate fountains.
	Vodná kaskáda a lipový kvet / Water cascade and Linden flower	1992	Juraj Hovorka	outside of the National Council of the Slovak Republic building, Námestie Alexandra Dubčeka, Old Town	
	Unknown name / Unknown name	1979	Pavel Mikšík	on the terrace vista in the exterior of Bratislava Castle, Old Town	
	Unknown name / Unknown name	1979	Pavel Mikšík	on the terrace vista in the exterior of Bratislava Castle, Old Town	
	Unknown name / Unknown name	1981	Pavel Mikšík	in the Bratislava Castle Park, Old Town	
	Unknown name / Unknown name	20??	unknown author	in the baroque garden of the Bratislava Castle, Old Town	
	Fontána SZM / Fountain of SZM	1980	Juraj Gavula	Majakovského Street No. 9, Old Town	The fountain is made of travertine. It is partially deconstructed and no longer functional.
	Unknown name / Unknown name	193?	unknown author	inside Koch Garden, Partizánska Street, Old Town	The fountain features cascading pools of water. The Koch Garden is not accessible to the public.
	Unknown name / Unknown name	20??	unknown author	Park One building, Námestie 1. mája No. 18, Old Town	
	Unknown name / Unknown name	N/A	unknown author	inside the building complex of the State Hospital at Mickiewiczova Street No. 13, Old Town	
	Labutia fontána / Swan fountain	1986	Pavel Mikšík	Medic garden, Old Town	The fountain replaced an older fountain by the same author called Mária which now stands in the Ružinov city part.
	Holubia fontána / Pigeon fountain	1986	fountain and statue by Pavel Mikšík	in the front garden of the Aspremonte Palace, in Old Town	Created in place of an original baroque fountain which has not been preserved. Main body is made of sandstone, the pigeons are made of bronze.
	Unknown name / Unknown name (also called pred Avionom)	1970, 1990	Strahlová	micro park on Americké námestie, close to the Avion building, Old Town	The fountain features a round concrete basin with a diameter of 6 meters, in the middle there is a sculpture made of stone with a diameter of 1,2 meters and 1 meter tall. Water sprouts from the jet on top of the rocks. It is situated in a micro park established by Jozef Mišák in 1933, hidden behind bushes.
	Fontána Vazkatana / Vazkatana fountain	197?	unknown author	in the area of the Gymnázium Jána Papánka, Vazovova Street No. 6, Old Town	The fountain features a concrete basin and it was not functional for a long time. The fountain was reconstructed and restarted on 10 May 2012.
	Marta / Martha	1974	Pavel Mikšík	in front of Palace of Justice near Justičná Street, Záhradnícka Street, Old Town	There is a sculpture made of stainless steel with dimensions 2,2 x 2,0 meters, symbolizing the water flower Nymphaea in the middle of the fountain. The fountain was out of order for a long time before being restored by Paming on 1 May 2003. The fountain is administered by Paming.
	Nataša / Natasha	1974	Pavel Mikšík	in front of Palace of Justice near Šoltésova Street, Záhradnícka Street, Old Town	There is a sculpture made of stainless steel with dimensions 2,2 x 2,0 meters, symbolizing the water flower Nymphaea in the middle of the fountain. The fountain was out of order for a long time before being restored by Paming on 23 May 2003. The fountain is administered by Paming.
	Fontána Martina Benku / Fountain of Martin Benka	1999	Rastislav Baláž, Miloš Maličevič	Námestie Martina Benku No. 8, Old Town	Not functional due to the canalization being damaged by cars. Sculpture dimensions: 70 x 140 x 180 centimeters. The fountain is made of travertine inlaid with granite.
	Unknown name / Unknown name	19??	unknown author	in front of the Bernolák student dormitory, Bernolákova Street No. 1, Old Town	
	Akt ženy (Zuzka) / Act of a woman (Susan)	1972	František Draškovič	Karadžičová Street, junction with Záhradnícka Street, Old Town	
	Vodné trysky / Water jets	20??	unknown author	behind Grand Hotel River Park, River Park, Dvořákovo nábrežie Street, Old Town	
	Unknown name / Unknown name	20??	unknown author	K Železnej studienke residence, K Železnej studienke Street, Old Town	
	Gejzír / Geyser	2000 (?)	unknown author	In the park belonging to the Račianske mýto junction, New Town	Height of the water column is 7 meters.
	Unknown name / Unknown name	1981	Pavel Mikšík	in the atrium of the Istropolis building, Vajnorská Street No. 1, New Town	The fountain is made of concrete, stainless steel and colored ceramice tiles.
	Unknown name / Unknown name	N/A	unknown author	Bartoškova Street, New Town	
	Unknown name / Unknown name	N/A	unknown author	Sadová Street, New Town	
	Unknown name / Unknown name	N/A	unknown author	in front of Hotel SET, Kalinčiakova Street No. 29/A, New Town	
	Fontána s figúrou / Fountain with a figure	19??	Pavol Tóth	outside of Hotel Dom Športu, near Polus City Center, Junácka Street 6, New Town	The fountain is made of artificial stone.
	Polus City Center fountain system / Sústava fontán Polus Center	2002	Martin Lettrich, Dušan Fischer	in front of the Polus City Center, Vajnorská Street No. 100, New Town	The main, outside part of the system of fountains that includes one long but narrow pool that actually runs through the main entrance hall and continues on the outside, it was constructed by Slovak company Mramor Ltd.. It is made of steel and tiles.
	Technická / Technical fountain	1983	Jozef Slíž	Ľudové námestie, New Town	
	Kvet / Flower	1964, 1991	Pavel Mikšík, Ivan Matušík	Hálková Street (outside of the Shopping Centre Slimák), New Town	
	Vodný prameň / Water stream	2007	Alexander Bilkovič (statue), Iľja Skoček, Pavol Bauer	in front of the New building of the Slovak National Theatre, Pribinova Street No. 12, Ružinov	The fountain is made of bronze, limestone and travertine.
	Unknown name / Unknown name	2007 (?)	unknown author	in front of the New building of the Slovak National Theatre, Pribinova Street No. 12, Ružinov	The fountain is next to the fountain Water Stream which is closer to the Slovak National Theatre building.
	Unknown name / Unknown name	2010	unknown author	Námestie Milana Rastiaslava Štefánika, next to Eurovea, near the Slovak National Theatre, Ružinov	The fountain's transparent floor is simultaneously the roof of the Eurovea shopping mall underneath.
	Milenci / Lovers	1959–1960, 2001	Alexander Trizuljak, Alexander Trizuljak jr.	in front of Hotel Dukla (Apollo), Dulovo námestie, Ružinov	
	Fontána lásky (Fontána pre Zuzanu) / Fountain of Love (Fountain for Suzanne)	1985	Miloš Kalina	Kupeckého Street, Ružinov	Pool diameter is 6.25 meters, the fountain is 3.5 meters tall, it is made of concrete and steel. The pillar represents a lotos flower. Constructed in 1985 as a movie prop for the movie Fontána pre Zuzanu, it was restored and made functional in 2008. A new pool had to be built and water is now flowing from 3 stages. The fountain includes a mechanical room in the underground.
	Plastika s raketou / Sculpture with a rocket	1974	unknown author	Kvačalova Street, Ružinov	
	Vejárová (Malá) / Fan fountain (Small)	1978	Ferdinand Milučký, Júlia Kunovská, Ladislav Mandiček	inside A. Hlinka Park, Ružinovská Street, Ružinov	
	Závojová (Veľká) / Veil fountain (Large)	1979	Ferdinand Milučký, Jozef Vachálek	inside A. Hlinka Park, Ružinovská Street, Ružinov	The fountain originally featured color lights along both of the veils, these are no longer functional. The fountain itself is functional, although seldom turned on.
	Mozaiková / Mosaic fountain	1978	Ladislav Gandl	Rezedová Street No. 8, Ružinov	The fountain is made of concrete and colored mosaic and it is 253 centimeters tall. The fountain was reconstructed in 2004.
	Unknown name / Unknown name	N/A	unknown author	in front of Chinese restaurant Garden, Seberíniho Street No. 1, Ružinov	
	Mária / Maria	1976	Pavel Mikšík	Bachova Street, Ružinov	Originally constructed for the City Park Medic garden as a kinetic piece using sound and light effects, it was made of stainless steel resting on ceramic plateau, its mobile parts were powered by water and some parts could be moved around by playing children. During the time the Park was renovated, the sculpture was moved temporarily to the Štrkovec part of Ružinov. Later, it was moved at its current place replacing a fountain by Jozef Jankovič.
	Vodná ruža (Lopatková) / Water rose (Paddle fountain)	1972	Vladimír Farár, Ladislav Pinkalský	Viliama Figuša-Bystrého Street, Ružinov	
	Puk lipy / Linden bud	1986	Alexander Bilkovič, Iľja Skoček (in Slovak)	Ivana Horvátha Street, Ružinov	The fountain basin features stairs. According to the original plans from the 1980s the basin should have contained Nymphaea plants.
	Kozmický kameň / Cosmic stone	19??	unknown author	Vladimíra Clementisa Street, Ružinov	
	Uránový kameň / Uranium stone	19??	unknown author	Uránová Street, Ružinov	Not functional, lack of funds for reconstruction. It is the smallest fountain in Ružinov. The sculpture depicting a rock of uranium is missing.
	Unknown name / Unknown name	1996	Pavel Mikšík	in front of the Všeobecná úverová banka headquarters, Mlynské nivy Street No. 1, Ružinov	The fountain uses a classic water management solution with an underground reservoir. The piece is made of granite and polished and gilded stainless steel. In the night hours it is lit with different light sources.
	Unknown name / Unknown name	2008	Architects: Siebert + Talaš Ltd.	outside of the Slovenský plynárenský priemysel headquarters, Mlynské nivy Street No. 44/A, Ružinov	Constructed by Slovak company Mramor Ltd.
	Unknown name / Unknown name	N/A	unknown author	outside of the SEPS headquarters, Mlynské nivy Street No. 59/A, Ružinov	Slovenská elektrizačná a prenosová sústava
	Unknown name / Unknown name	N/A	unknown author	outside of the Trade Center I building, Mlynské nivy Street No. 73, Ružinov	
	Unknown name / Unknown name	2004	Ivan Kubík (architect)	outside of the BBC V, Bratislavské Business Centrum 5 building, Plynárenská Street No. 7, Ružinov	Constructed by Slovak company Mramor Ltd.
	Unknown name / Unknown name	N/A	unknown author	in the central atrium of the Apollo Business Center II, Ružinov	
	Unknown name / Unknown name	N/A	unknown author	in the area of the Avion Shopping Park, Ivánska cesta Street No. 16, Ružinov	
	Unknown name / Unknown name	2009	unknown author	Domino building, Tranvská cesta Street No. 74, Ružinov	The fountain was opened unfinished and it is not functional.
	Unknown name / Unknown name	N/A	unknown author	Bratislava Water Company (BVS) headquarters, Prešovská Street No. 48, Ružinov	
	Fontána v lodenici / Fountain in the shipyard	1977	Pavel Mikšík	cargo Port of Bratislava, Horárska Street No. 12, Ružinov	The fountain is made of concrete and welded aluminium and it is 276,5 centimeters tall. The fountain is not functional.
	Jurki dom / Jurki house fountain	N/A	unknown author	near Domkárska Street, Ružinov	
	Pijúce holubice / Drinking doves	1982	design: Ambróz Balážik, realization: Arpád Katona	Sad Janka Kráľa, Petržalka	Fountain was made of silumin (an alloy of 90% aluminium and 10% silicon) by the Czechoslovak company Zlieváreň ZSNP in Žiar nad Hronom. Doves are 4.5 meters tall, they were made separate and all the pieces were finalized in Sad Janka Kráľa. The water basin has a diameter of 15 meters and it contains water jets that project water to the height of over 5 meters. During construction, the fountain was known as Peace doves on a nuclear mushroom / Mierové holubice na atómovom hríbe.
	Unknown name / Unknown name	N/A	unknown author	outside of the erotic saloon in Sad Janka Kráľa, Petržalka	
	Potok Aupark / Aupark stream	N/A	unknown author	outside of the Aupark shopping mall, Petržalka	
	Unknown name / Unknown name	N/A	unknown author	system of fountains outside of Digital Park, Panónska Street, Petržalka	
	Unknown name / Unknown name	N/A	unknown author	inside the area of the Incheba Expo congress centre, Viedenská cesta No. 3, Petržalka	
	Fontána Centurion / Centurion Fountain	N/A	unknown author	Viedenská cesta Street, Petržalka	
	Unknown name / Unknown name	2006	Kočan, Beňačka (architects)	outside of the Forte Extra (Plus 7 dní) building, Petržalka	Constructed by Slovak company Mramor Ltd.
	Unknown name / Unknown name	N/A	unknown author	Mánesovo námestie, Petržalka	Not functional.
	Unknown name / Unknown name	N/A	unknown author	Bosákova Street / Mlynarovičova Street, Petržalka	One source claims the fountain was constructed together with benches as part of a renovation project.
	Spievajúca fontána (Nika) / Singing fountain (Nika)	N/A	unknown author	in front of Technopol building, Kutlíkova Street No. 17, Petržalka	For a short time during the summer, the fountain is accompanied by music in the evenings. It is the only fountain with sound effects in Bratislava.
	Unknown name / Unknown name	N/A	unknown author	Topoľčianska Street, Petržalka	
	Vlna / Wave	1975	Tibor Bártfay, Jiří Uhlíř	Pekná cesta, Rača	
	Rozprávka (Dráčik) / Fairytale (Little dragon fountain)	1973	Ivan Vychlopen, Jozef Slíž	Plicková Street, Rača	
	Kozmická / Cosmic fountain	1973	Tibor Kavecký, Jozef Slíž	Jurkovičová Street, Rača	
	Fontána / Fountain	1983	Jozef Barinka	in front of the dormitory of the Police Academy of the Slovak Police Force, Sklabinská Street No. 1, Rača	Situated in the area called Východné (Rendez), the fountain features a round basin covered in ceramic tiles. The sculpture representing a stylized group of people is made of Chtelnica sandstone. The fountain was not functional but it was reconstructed in 2016.
	Unknown name / Unknown name (also called Japonská fontána)	N/A	unknown author	inside the area of the Slovak Academy of Sciences, Dúbravská cesta Street No. 9, Patrónka, Karlova Ves	The fountain features a small pond.
	Unknown name / Unknown name	1983	Jozef Jankovič	in the area of Štátna veterinárna správa, Botanická Street No. 7, Karlova Ves	The fountain is made of concrete, granite and ceramic tiles.
	Chlapec s volavkou / Boy with a heron	N/A	Robert Kühmayer	Vodárenská Garden, between Karloveské rameno and Devínska cesta, Karlova Ves	The fountain is a replica of the fountain that stood in front of the villa of graf Lanfranconi in Mlynská dolina made by the Brno art craft union. The copy was part of the deposit collection of Bratislava City Museum and it was installed at this place in 2012 with the reconstruction of the Vodárenská Garden. The sculpture is made from a metal alloy.
	Unknown name / Unknown name	N/A	unknown author	Pribišova Street No. 6, Dlhé diely, Karlova Ves	Features LED light effects.
	Rodina (Hríby) / Family (Mushrooms)	1980	Irina Kedrová, Anna Dandarová	Karloveská Street, Karlova Ves	
	Technická / Technical fountain	1974	Teodor Lugs, Eugénia Lugsová, Jozef Fabianek	Jurigovo námestie, Karlova Ves	
	Technická / Technical fountain	1970	Jozef Fabianek	Adámiho Street No. 8, at the corner of Adámiho Street and Nováckeho Street, Karlova Ves	The fountain consists of two basins one above the other, the lower being 14 x 9 meters, the upper 5 x 5 meters. Both are covered in ceramic tiles. The fountain was unfinished at its launch, featuring a concrete pedestal for a sculpture that was never installed. Due to problems with water drainage and repeated complaints about excessive noise from citizens living near the fountain it was turned off after 1 or 3 years (depending on the source). In 2006 the fountain was reconstructed by the city company Paming after repeated complains from the citizens about the fountain not functioning. The technological parts of the fountain were reconstructed while the outside appearance remained the same. The fountain was restarted after 25 years on 9 May 2006. The fountain can be controlled by remote control.
	Fontána a potok / Fountain and Water stream	2006	Stanislav Talaš, Vladimír Talaš, Igor Pohanič, Ľudmila Šírová	Námestie Sv. Františka, Karlova Ves	The fountain was opened on 9 May 2006. It features multicolor lighting.
	Technická / Technical fountain	1973	unknown author	Borská Street, Karlova Ves	The square basin is 6 x 6 meters made of concrete and travertine inlaid with blue ceramic tiles. The fountain is not functional, the city claims lack of funds of reconstruction.
	Technická / Technical fountain	1976	Štefánia Krumlová	Batková Street, Dúbravka	
	Unknown name / Unknown name	2007	Martin Lettrich	surrounded by the residential complex "Koprivnica", Koprivnická Street in Dúbravka	The fountain is built on private property and it is not accessible to the public. It is not visible from any public space.
	Plastika kvetu – lotosový kvet / Flower sculpture - Lotos flower	1979 (?)	M. Uher, Tibor Kavecký, Jozef Slíž (?)	Ožvoldíková Street, Dúbravka	The fountain was out of order for some time before being re-painted and restarted at 15 May 2003. It was later restored in 2005 and again in 2007, being repeatedly vandalized. The rectangle pool is 12 x 6 meters, made of ferro-concrete with ceramic tiles, the sculpture representing a flower is made from metal. The fountain is administered by Paming.
	Fontána Studňa / Well fountain	2011 (?)	unknown author	Roľnícka Street, Vajnory	In 2011, residents of Vajnory inquired about the possibility to construct a fountain in front of the reconstructed Ľudový dom. According to the Monument Protection Office neither a fountain or a city-type water well can be constructed here due to historical reasons. Instead a village-type decorative pump with a small basin to circulate the water was constructed.
	Unknown name / Unknown name	201?	unknown author	Park Pod lipami, Vajnory	
	Unknown name / Unknown name	19??	unknown author	Rakús park, Na doline Street, Vajnory	The fountain consists of two separate small square basins. The fountain is not functional, being technically unfit for operation and the city borough claims insufficient funds for operation of the fountain. In 2014, the fountain was converted into plant pots.
	Unknown name / Unknown name	195?	unknown author	park next to the geriatric hospital, Krajinská Street, Podunajské Biskupice	The fountain features a simple round basin with a lining of artificial stone. It was constructed probably in the 1950s together with the hospital. The fountain is not functional.
	Unknown name / Unknown name	N/A	unknown author	park next to the geriatric hospital, Krajinská Street, Podunajské Biskupice	The fountain features an asymmetrical basin made of stone. The fountain is not functional.
	Vtáčia fontána / Bird fountain	2003	Martin Lettrich	Záhorská Bystrica	
	Unknown name / Unknown name	2006	Pavel Mikšík	on an unknown square in Záhorská Bystrica	
	Unknown name / Unknown name	N/A	unknown author	Žltá Street No. 1/A, Jarovce	
	Unknown name / Unknown name	2001	Mišík	Balkánska Street, Rusovce	Opened on 30 September 2001.

The following fountains used to exist in the city in the past:

- Fontána v Rozáriu (Fountain in the rosarium) by Ladislav Majerský (statue), it was originally built in Sad Janka Kráľa, Petržalka in 1937. The statue of a woman was later moved (without the fountain) into the area of swimming pool at Tehelné pole and in the 1970s, the water reservoir was removed from Sad Janka Kráľa (together with the rosarium).
- Unknown baroque fountain which stood in the front garden of the Aspremonte Palace, in Old Town, it was replaced by Holubia fontána (Pigeon fountain) by Pavel Mikšík in 1986.
- Fontána Rodina (Fountain Family) by Jozef Jankovič, Bachova Street, Ružinov removed in 1974 or 1985 and in 1985 it was replaced by current fountain Mária by Pavel Mikšík.
- Fontána Kvety (Flowers fountain) from 1989 by Ľubomír Jakubčík on Malokarpatské námestie 8 in Lamač was a concrete and ceramic fountain that was damaged and not functional. It was removed in 2012.

=== List of interior fountains in Bratislava ===
Image	Name / Translation	Year	Artist	Location / Coordinates	Notes
	Unknown name / Unknown name	2004	unknown author	inside Aupark shopping mall, Petržalka	Constructed by Slovak company Mramor Ltd.
	Unknown name / Unknown name	2002	Martin Lettrich	inside Avion Shopping Park	
	Unknown name / Unknown name	1981	Pavel Mikšík	in the atrium of Bratislava Culture Centre	
	Unknown name / Unknown name	1993	Martin Lettrich	Hotel Perugia, Zelená Street 5, Old Town	
	Unknown name / Unknown name	1993	Martin Lettrich	Hungarian Embassy in Slovakia, Sedlárska Street 3, Old Town	
	Unknown name / Unknown name	1994	Martin Lettrich	Stredisko cenných papierov, 29. Augusta Street 1/A	
	Unknown name / Unknown name	1994	Martin Lettrich	Stavebná sporiteľna, unknown location	
	Unknown name / Unknown name	1995	Martin Lettrich	Oriflame, unknown location	
	Unknown name / Unknown name	1997	Martin Lettrich	GR Hydrostav, unknown location	
	Unknown name / Unknown name	1998	Martin Lettrich	Ministry of Foreign Affairs of Slovakia, Hlboká cesta 2, Old Town, entrance hall and the minister's premises	
	Unknown name / Unknown name	1998	Martin Lettrich	Slovnaft a.s., unknown location	
	Unknown name / Unknown name	1998	Martin Lettrich	Infin, spol. s r.o., unknown location	
	Unknown name / Unknown name	1999	Martin Lettrich	Ernst & Young, unknown location	
	Unknown name / Unknown name	2000	Martin Lettrich	Pentagon s.r.o., unknown location	
	Unknown name / Unknown name	2002	Martin Lettrich	Transpetrol, unknown location	
	Unknown name / Unknown name	2000–2002	Martin Lettrich	main entrance hall of the Polus City Center on Vajnorská Street No. 100, New Town	Inside part of a system of fountains that includes one long but narrow pool that actually runs through the main entrance hall and continues on the outside, it was constructed by Slovak company Mramor Ltd.
	Unknown name / Unknown name	2003	Martin Lettrich	interior fountains, Unibanka - not even sure if this is in Bratislava	
	Unknown name / Unknown name	2003	Martin Lettrich	inside the reception area of "Klub Penati", Agátová Street No. 33, Dúbravka	"Klub Penati" is a private club and the fountain is not accessible to the public.
	Island / Iceland	2006	Martin Lettrich	interior fountain in Elektrovod, unknown location	
	Unknown name / Unknown name	2007	Martin Lettrich	Entrance hall of Tower 115	
	Unknown name / Unknown name	2008	Architects: Siebert + Talaš Ltd.	Slovenský plynárenský priemysel headquarters, Plynárenská Street	Constructed by Slovak company Mramor Ltd.
	Unknown name / Small one	2008	Martin Lettrich	inside Apollo Business Center	Constructed by Slovak company Mramor Ltd.
	Unknown name / Large one	2008	Martin Lettrich	inside Apollo Business Center	Constructed by Slovak company Mramor Ltd.
	Unknown name / Unknown name	2012	Ing. arch. Kornel Kobák, Ing. arch. Zuzana Cambelová	A private citizen's mansion, unknown location	Constructed by Slovak company Mramor Ltd.
	Unknown name / Unknown name	N/A	unknown author	inside House of Culture Ružinov (DK Ružinov)	Not functional, the fountain is uninstalled from its basin. It used to contain spheres made of stainless steel and chrome and it was designed together with the huge lamp above the fountain.
	Unknown name / Unknown name	N/A	unknown author	inside Shopping Palace, Cesta na Senec No. 2/A, Zlaté Piesky	
	Unknown name / Unknown name	N/A	Peter Bauer, Dušan Buřila	entrance hall of the new Slovak National Theatre building	
	Unknown name / Unknown name	N/A	unknown author	Galvaniho Business Center, Galvaniho Street, Ružinov	
	Unknown name / Unknown name	N/A	unknown author	passage near the National Theater at Gorkého Street, Old Town	
	Kamenná fontána / Stone fountain	1996	Jozef Vachálek	Poštová banka passage, Laurinská Street 4, Old Town	The fountain is 300 centimeters tall and it is made of iron, steel and glass.
	Unknown name / Unknown name	N/A	unknown author	Shopping Center Central, Metodova Street 6, Ružinov	

The following interior fountains used to exist in the city in the past:

- Fountain inside the lobby of the former hotel Forum (today Crowne Plaza) at Hodžovo námestie, Old Town. The fountain was removed after the hotel was sold and reconstructed.

== List of drinking fountains in Bratislava ==
Part of the drinking water fountains is out of order at any given time.

Image	Name	Translation	Year	Artist	Street/Square Coordinates	Notes
	Picia fontánka - Ryba	Drinking fountain - Fish	unknown date	unknown author	Sedlárska Street No. 10, Old Town	Administered by Paming, according to some sources it is in depository
	Picia fontánka - Váza	Drinking fountain - Vase	unknown date	unknown author	garden of the Grassalkovich Palace, Old Town	Administered by Paming, according to some sources it is in depository
	Palugyayova studňa	Palugyay well	unknown date	unknown author	Zelená Street No. 1, Old Town	Administered by Paming
	u Červeného raka	Drinking fountain at the Red Crayfish	unknown date	unknown author	Michalská Street No. 26, Red Crayfish Pharmacy building, Old Town	Administered by Paming
	Putto s rybou II	Putto with a fish II	unknown date	unknown author	inside a courtyard of a house on Biela Street, Old Town	Baroque drinking fountain. Administered by Paming
	Picia fontánka - Palffyovská	Palffy drinking fountain	unknown date	unknown author	Panská Street No. 19 (Johann Pálffy Palace), Old Town	Administered by Paming
	Vtáčia fontána	Bird fountain	1900	original by Stollwerk company of Bratislava	intersection of Panská Street, Ventúrska Street and Strakova Street, Old Town	Original fountain is from 1900, made in the Czech city Blansko, later removed. In 2001 an epoxide copy was installed which was replaced by an iron copy in 2002. It offers drinking options for dogs, humans and birds. It is owned by the Old Town city district.
	Unknown name	Unknown name	1998	Martin Lettrich	Panská Street, Old Town	
	Unknown name	Unknown name	unknown date	Alexander Bilkovič	Námestie SNP, in front of Stará Tržnica, Old Town	Administered by Paming. Made of Cuban marble and stainless steel
	Unknown name	Unknown name	unknown date	Alexander Bilkovič	eastern part of Hviezdoslavovo námestie, Old Town	Administered by Paming. Made of Cuban marble and stainless steel
	Unknown name	Unknown name	unknown date	Alexander Bilkovič	western part of Hviezdoslavovo námestie, Old Town	Administered by Paming. Made of Cuban marble and stainless steel
	Unknown name	Unknown name	unknown date	Alexander Bilkovič	Medic Garden, Old Town	Made of Cuban marble and stainless steel
	Unknown name	Unknown name (large)	1986	Pavel Mikšík	Medic Garden, Old Town	Made of marble and stainless steel
	Unknown name	Unknown name (middle)	1986	Pavel Mikšík	Medic Garden, Old Town	Made of marble and stainless steel
	Unknown name	Unknown name (small)	1986	Pavel Mikšík	Medic Garden, Old Town	Made of marble and stainless steel, accessible to children
	Strážna búdka s pitnou fontánkou	Guard post with a drinking fountain	2006	Marián Prešnajder, Otto Grossmann and Juraj Šimek	Hlavné námestie, Old Town	Administered by Paming
	Unknown name	Unknown name	2006	unknown author	Župné námestie, Old Town	Administered by Paming
	Unknown name	Unknown name	unknown date	unknown author	Platform No. 1 of the Bratislava Main Railway Station, Old Town	
	Unknown name	Unknown name	unknown date	unknown author	In front of former Hotel Forum (today Crowne Plaza) at Obchodná Street, Old Town	
	Unknown name	Unknown name	unknown date	unknown author	Rybné Námestie, in front of Hotel Danube, Old Town	
	Tajpejská fontánka	Taipei drinking fountain	28 March 2012	unknown author	Vajanského nábrežie riverbank, in front of the Old Town District Office, Old Town	Built by R.O.C. (Taiwan) Development Fund
	Unknown name	Unknown name	N/A	unknown author	Sad Janka Kráľa, Petržalka	
	Unknown name	Unknown name	N/A	unknown author	Sad Janka Kráľa, Petržalka	
	Unknown name	Unknown name	N/A	unknown author	Sad Janka Kráľa, Petržalka	
	Unknown name	Unknown name	N/A	unknown author	Petržalské korzo, Petržalka	
	Unknown name	Unknown name	N/A	unknown author	Petržalské korzo, Petržalka	
	Unknown name	Unknown name	N/A	unknown author	Petržalské korzo, Petržalka	
	Pitná fontána	Drinking fountain	20??	Anita Mudrochová	Kopčianska Street 8, Petržalka	
	Unknown name	Unknown name	N/A	unknown author	Pekníkova Street Park, Dúbravka	
	Unknown name	Unknown name	2008	Martin Lettrich	Partizánska lúka in the Bratislava Forest Park, New Town	
	Unknown name	Unknown name	N/A	unknown author	Partizánska lúka in the Bratislava Forest Park, New Town	Made of stone
	Unknown name	Unknown name	N/A	unknown author	Zlaté Piesky, Ružinov	
	Unknown name	Unknown name	N/A	unknown author	Zlaté Piesky, Ružinov	
	Unknown name	Unknown name	N/A	unknown author	Zlaté Piesky, Ružinov	

== List of water wells in Bratislava ==
In the Middle Ages, every house in the walled city of Bratislava had a water well, usually several of them, being the main source of water supply. They were built at terrain level but also in the basements of buildings. Wells in Bratislava were supplied mainly from shallow waters circulating in the Danube river terraces and from three identified streams originating at Kozia Street, Hlboká cesta Street and at the Slavín hill. As of 2011, there were 66 documented wells in the Old Town. 12 are restored and accessible, the well at the courtyard of the Universitas Istropolitana is the oldest. As of today, none of the water wells in Bratislava are actually used and they serve a purely decorative function.

Image	Name	Translation	Year	Artist	Street/Square Coordinates
	Studňa na Župnom námestí	Well at Župa Square	discovered and restored in 2006	unknown author	Župné námestie, Old Town
	Studňa na Primaciálnom námestí	Well at Primate's Square	medieval, discovered and restored in 1977	author unknown	Primaciálne námestie, Old Town
	Studňa U Červeného raka	Well by the Red Crayfish Pharmacy	medieval	author unknown	Michalská Street 26, Old Town
	Unknown name	Unknown name	medieval	author unknown	inside courtyard of the Universitas Istropolitana on Ventúrska Street, Old Town
	Unknown name	Unknown name	date unknown, discovered during construction	author unknown	inside the medieval palace of marshall Pálffy on Ventúrska Street 10, Old Town
	Unknown name	Unknown name	date unknown, discovered during construction	author unknown	inside the basement of the neo-gothic addition to the Old Town Hall (Bratislava), Old Town.
	Unknown name	Unknown name	medieval	author unknown	inside Kaffee Mayer, Hlavné námestie, Old Town.
	Unknown name	Unknown name	medieval	author unknown	inside a vine shop on Sedlárska Street, Old Town.
	Unknown name	Unknown name	date unknown, reconstructed in 2008	author unknown	Hlboká cesta, Old Town.
	Unknown name	Unknown name	medieval	author unknown	Bratislava Castle courtyard, the deepest in Bratislava at 85 meters.
	Unknown name	Unknown name	date unknown	author unknown	Balkánska Street, Rusovce. Constructed in 2011 at the place of an older well.
	Horánska studňa / Dúbravská studňa	Horánska well / Dúbravka well	16th century	author unknown	Old Dúbravka, Dúbravka

== See also ==
- History of Bratislava
- Old Town, Bratislava
- Tourism in Slovakia

== Bibliography ==
- JANOTA, I. Príbehy bratislavských fontán a studní. Bratislava : Marenčin PT. 2009. 192 p. (in Slovak)
- BUBLINCOVÁ, B., HOLČÍK, Š. Bratislavské fontány. Bratislava : Tatran. 1990. 96 p. (in Slovak)
