= Alojz Rigele =

Slovak sculptor and painter

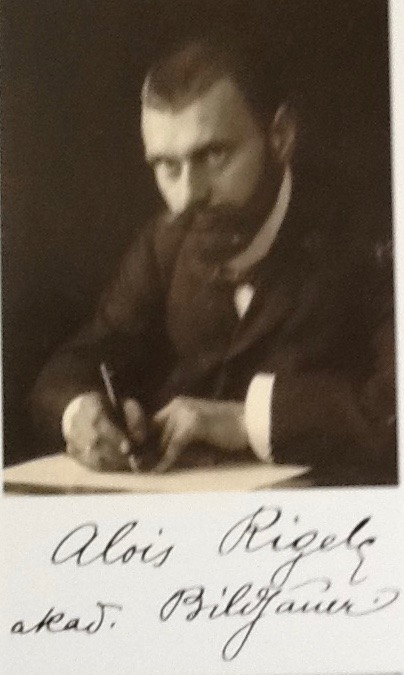
Image of Alois Rigele

Alojz Rigele (8 February 1879 – 14 February 1940) was a Slovak sculptor and painter. He spent most of his life working in today's Bratislava, where numerous examples of his statues survive to this day. Rigele was considered to be among the leading sculptors in Slovakia before World War I. His specialty was sculpture, especially portrait.

Together with Robert Kühmayer, Jozef Arpád Murmann and Alojz Stróbl, Alojz Rigele was part of a group of famous artists that influenced the art and architecture of the city of Bratislava. This older generation of sculptors born before the 1900s often represented historical and social themes. Rigele was an active member of the Pressburger Kunstverein group and the Bratislava Beautification Association. The Alchymist from approximately 1920 is considered to be among Rigele's finest sculptures.

== Biography ==
Alojz Rigele was born in 1879 in Pressburg (today Bratislava). His early education was at the modelling studio of the Bratislava decorative sculptor Adolf Messmer. He started exhibiting his works at Bratislava exhibitions since 1899. He studied at the Academy of Fine Arts Vienna from 1901 to 1908 under professor Jan Bitterlich and professor Edmund von Hellmer. As a winner of Péter Pázmány's epitaph in 1907, Rigele got a 2-year study opportunity at Rome where he lived from 1908 to 1910. In 1911, Rigele settled in Bratislava.

He was a prolific author who took a large number of orders of varying scope, which resulted in the varying quality of his output. He created most of his works between 1897 and 1938. He received and declined numerous offers for professorship at universities in Prague and Budapest. Despite the arguable quality of some of his artworks, he never succeeded financially and he was not able to acquire his own professional studio. Alojz Rigele died in poverty in Bratislava in 1940.

Numerous statues survive in public spaces particularly in Bratislava, but also in over 50 villages and towns in Slovakia, Austria and Hungary. Many of Rigele's statues and paintings are preserved at the Bratislava City Gallery, Slovak National Gallery and the Bratislava City Museum.

== Rigele's studio ==
Rigele created his works in his rented apartment inside the Lanfranconi Palace at today's Námestie Ľ. Štúra and in his studio inside a yard of a house on Štefánikova Street. The studio was located at that time at No. 27a; today it is located at No. 35 – 41 behind three residential buildings. The studio is a low, narrow wooden structure with one wall made of glass. It was built in the 1890s by local construction tycoon Karl Mahr. Štefánina Street was from the 1840s the main road connecting the Bratislava main railway station with the city center. It was a street of luxury houses, palaces and villas. Karl Mahr acquired a land lot at this street which was used as a construction yard during the construction of buildings in the area. The yard was the headquarters of the notable stonemason company MAHR, which was owned by the unmarried sister of Karl Mahr. The Mahrs invested heavily into World War I war bonds that became valueless after the lost war. They had to sell all their houses and continued to live there as tenants.

Alojz Rigele created most of his works inside this studio or outside, on the yard. Altogether, he used the studio for four decades and even long after his death in 1940 and the studio's later nationalization, there were parts of unfinished artworks lying around together with rare building materials including a piece of marble from the destroyed equestrian statue of Maria Theresa which stood at the today's Námestíe Ľ. Štúra. The studio is a Category 1A Cultural Monument of Bratislava under the name Ateliér firmy Mahr a Alojza Rigeleho.

== Gallery ==
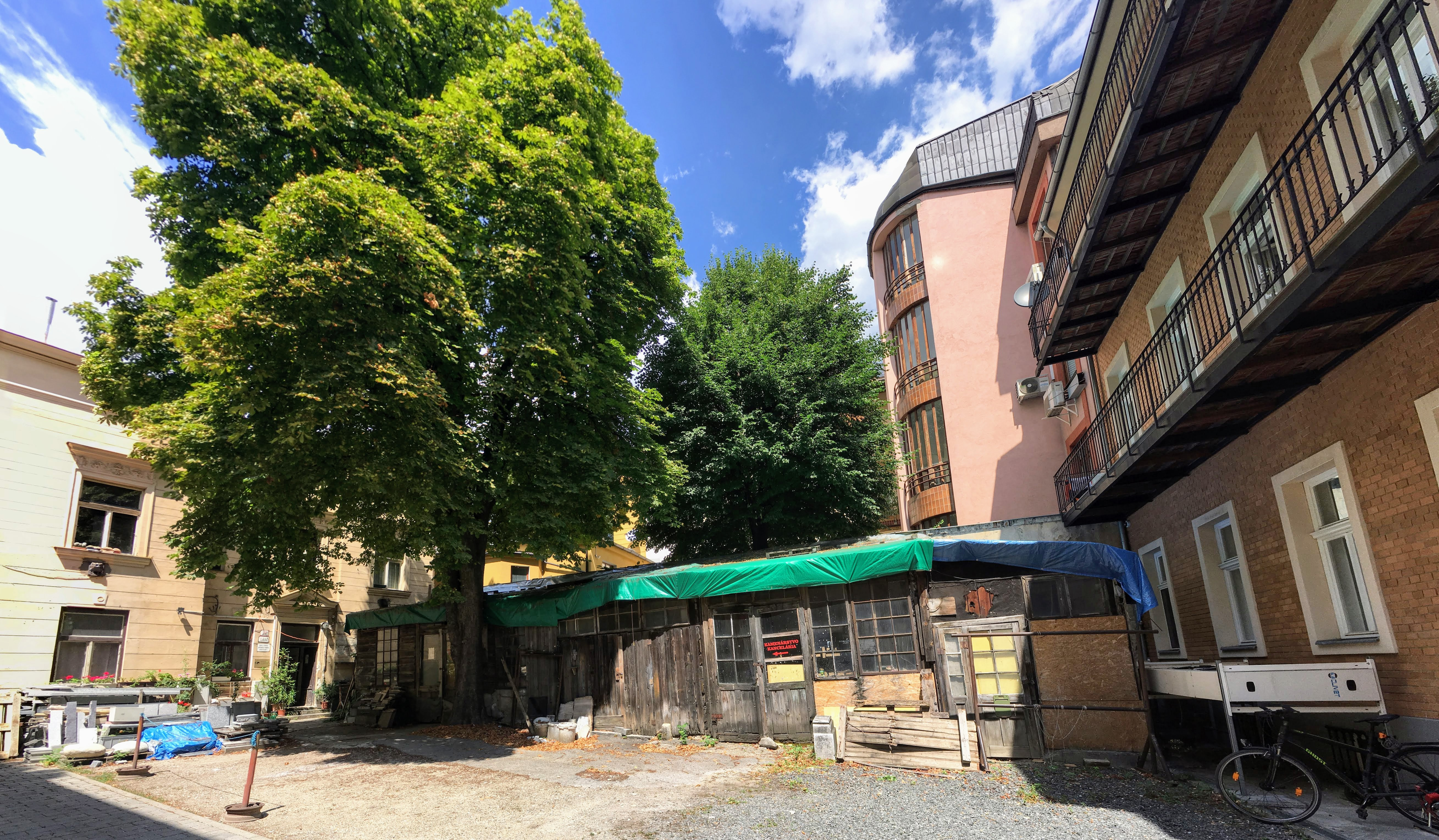
Alojz Rigele - atelier

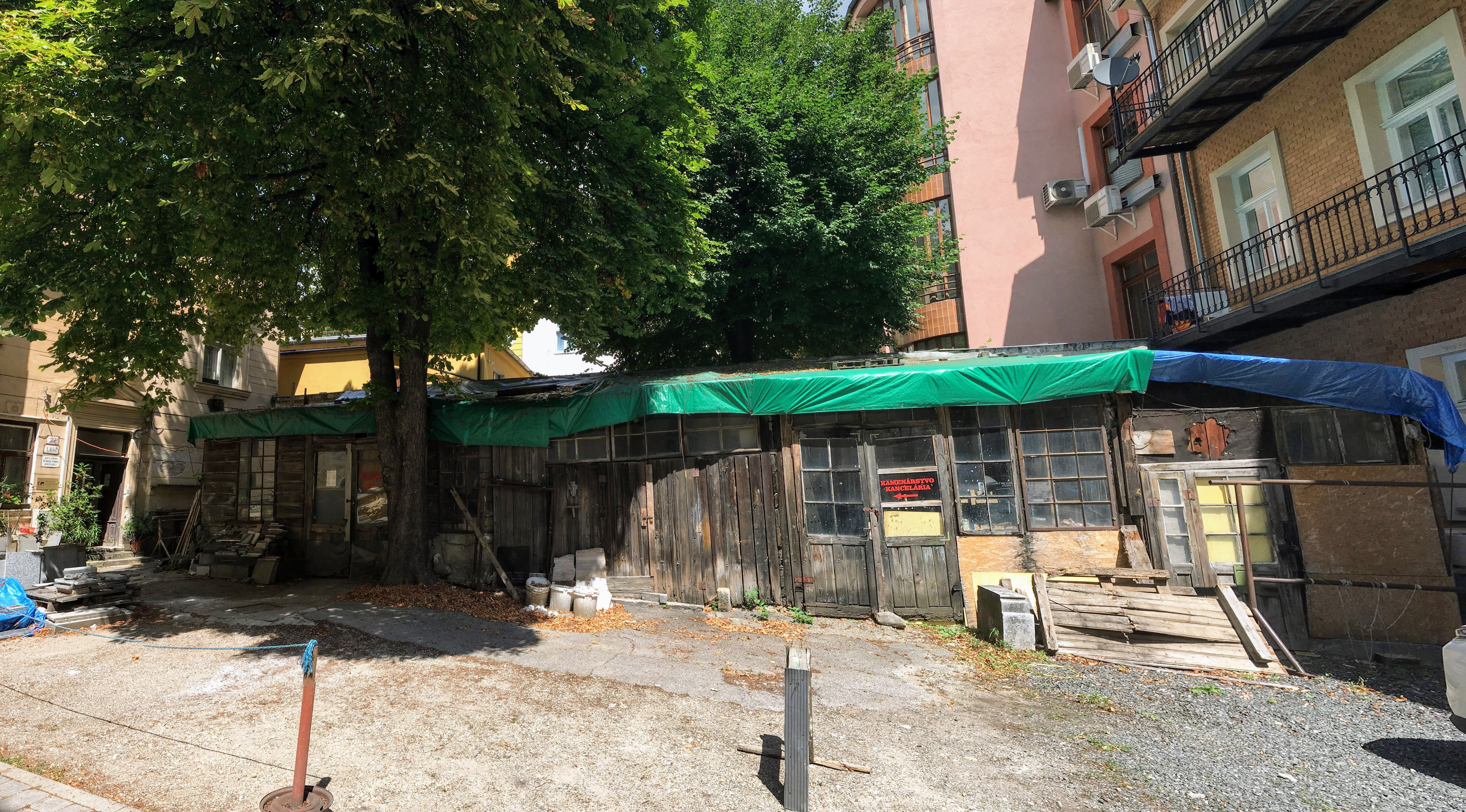
Alojz Rigele - atelier

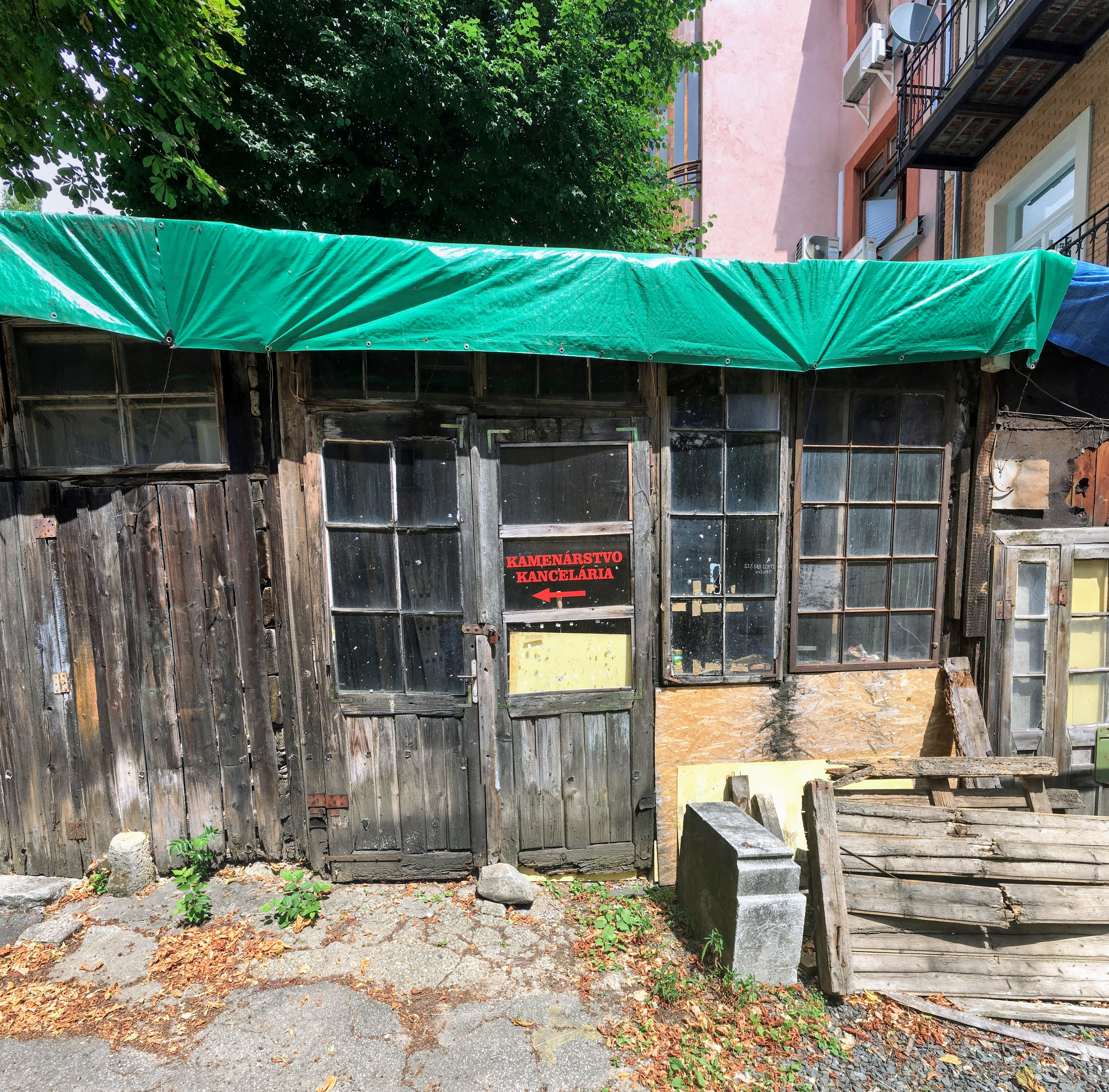
Alojz Rigele - atelier

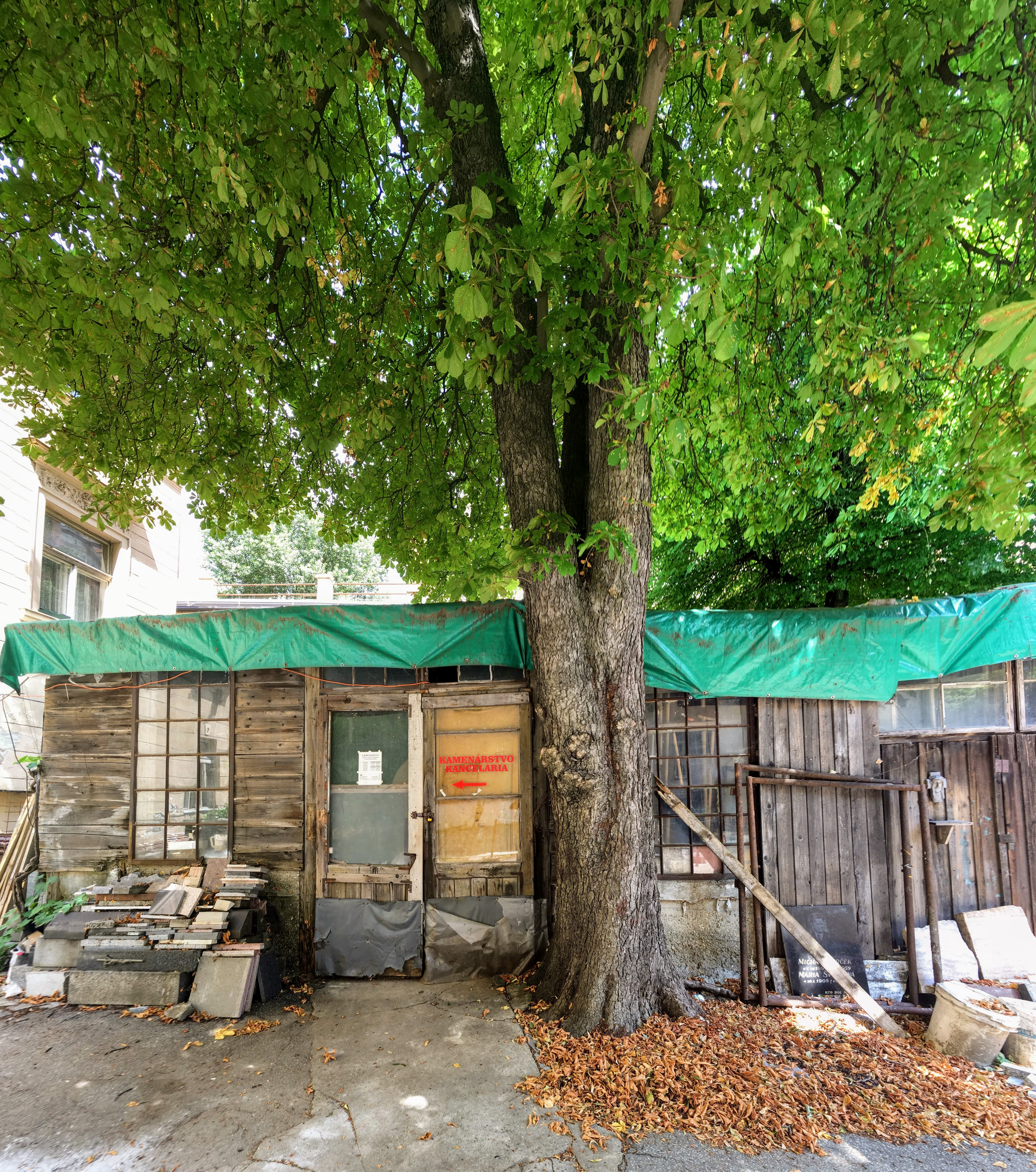
Alojz Rigele - atelier

== Surviving works ==
Image	Name / Translation	Year	Location / Coordinates	Notes
	Christ the Saviour	1904	Pharmacy Salvator building, Panská Street No. 35, Old Town, Bratislava	Made of stone.
	Fontána Dievča so srnkou / Fountain Girl with a deer	1942	upper part of Hviezdoslavovo square, Old Town, Bratislava	Alojz Rigele is the co-author of the sandstone sculpture that is part of the fountain together with Robert Kühmayer.
	Relief of Queen Sissi / Reliéf kráľovnej Sissi	1910-1912	Blue Church, Bezručova Street No. 2, Old Town, Bratislava	Made of marble

== Awards ==
- Gundel's plaquette
- Péter Pázmány's epitaph (1907)

== See also ==
- History of Bratislava
- List of fountains in Bratislava
