= Roland Fountain =

Fountain in Bratislava, Slovakia

Coordinates: 48°08′36″N 17°06′30″E

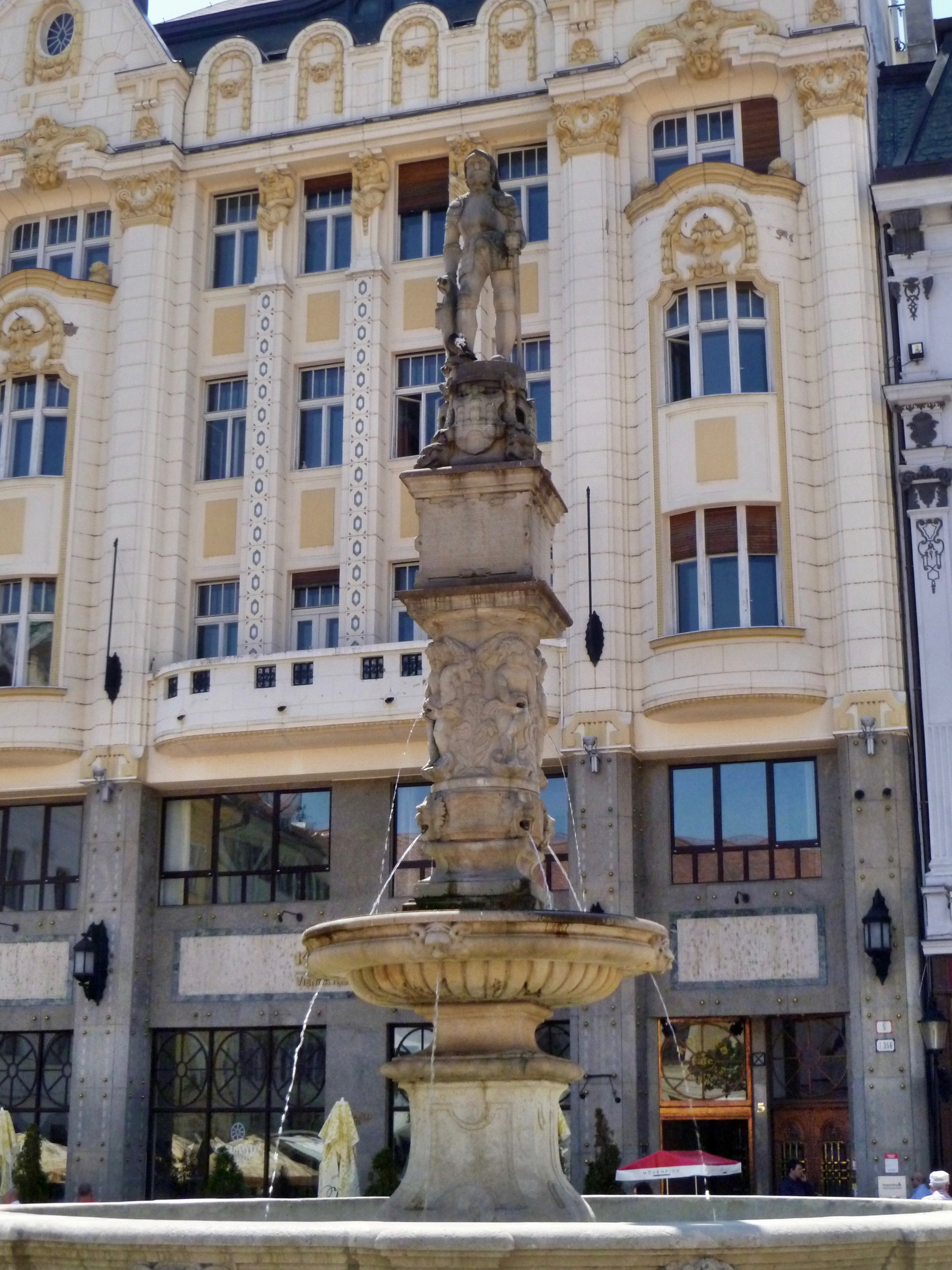
Roland Fountain

The Roland Fountain (sometimes referred to as Maximilian Fountain; Slovak: Rolandova fontána or Maximiliánova fontána) is a Roland statue and among the most famous fountains in Bratislava, Slovakia. It is located on the Main Square of the Old Town.

Its construction was ordered by Maximilian II, the king of Royal Hungary, in 1572 to provide a public water supply. The fountain is topped by a statue of Maximilian portrayed as a knight in full armour sculpted by master A. Lutringer. Its current appearance is probably far from its original look, since it has been modified and rebuilt several times. However its popularity remains unaltered, still being one of the downtown's favorite meeting points. Many legends are centred on this fountain, mostly featuring Maximilian as the town's protector. The fountain was restored to its 16th century appearance in 2019.

== See also ==
- List of fountains in Bratislava
