= Hodžovo námestie =

Square in Bratislava, Slovakia

Coordinates: 48°08′55″N 17°06′27″E

Hodžovo Square
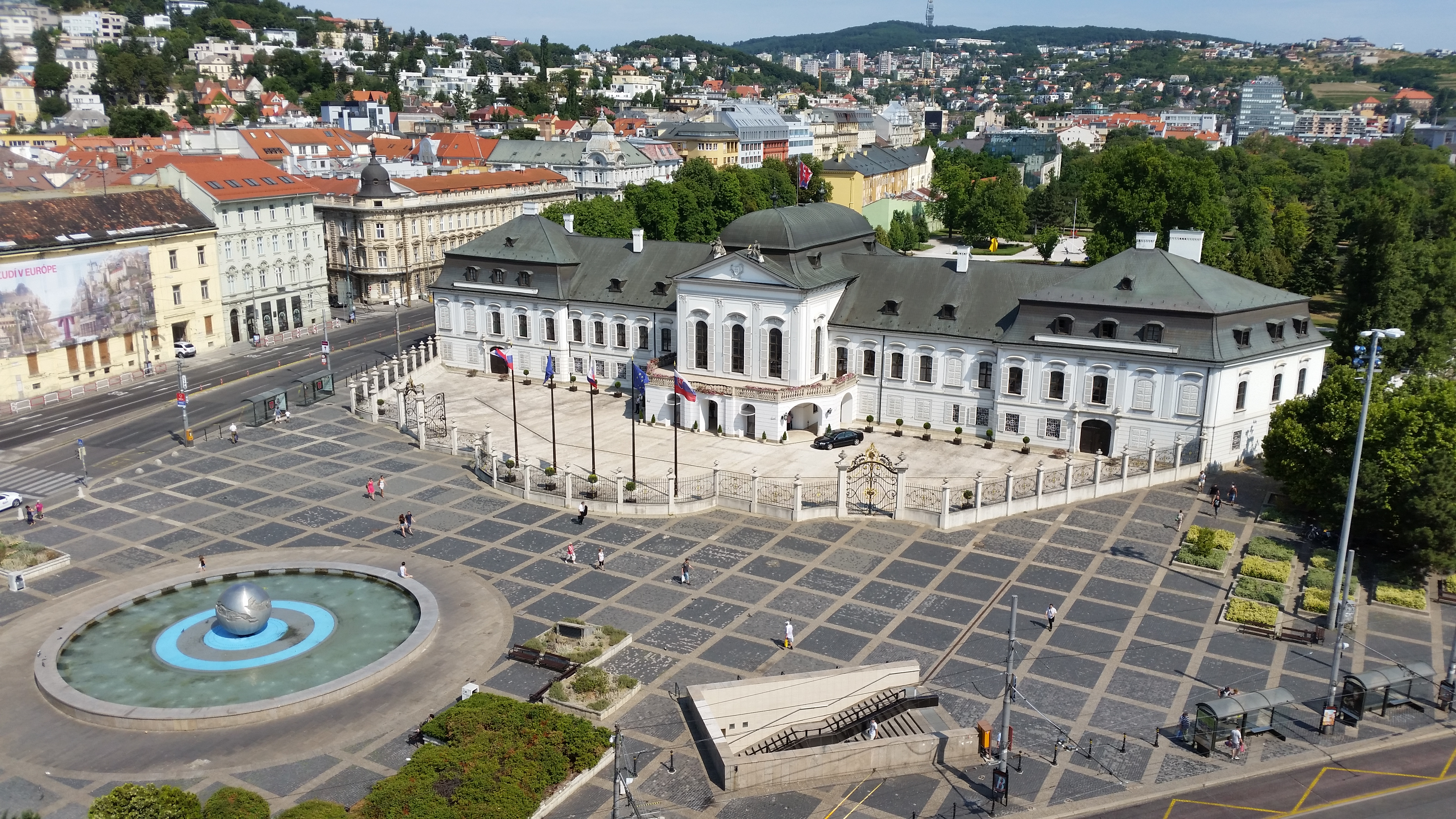
- Aerial view of the square with Grassalkovich Palace
- Interactive map of Hodžovo Square
- Native name: Hodžovo námestie (Slovak)
- Location: Bratislava
- From: Štefánikova Street
- To: Staromestská Street

Construction
- Construction start: c. 18th century

Hodžovo námestie (English: Hodžovo Square, locally referred to as Hodžko or Mierko) is a major square in Bratislava, the capital of Slovakia. The square is located at the edge of Old Town, in front of the Slovak Presidential Palace, some 5 minutes walking distance from the historical city center. It is considered to be the center of Bratislava (although Main Square is also considered to be the center) and it is the place of almost all of the foreign states visits.

A fountain called Earth — planet of peace is the centerpiece of the square, serving as one of the most common meeting points in the city. There is a vehicle underpass under this square as well as an underpass for pedestrians with shops and fast-food built in the 1970s (renovated sometime in the 21st century). Landmarks on this square include the Rococo/late Baroque Grassalkovich Palace from the 18th century and former Hotel Forum, an example of post-modern architecture in Bratislava. Hodžovo Square serves as an important public transport hub in the city. At the beginning of the 21st century new construction dramatically changed the look of this historical square.

== Name ==
The square is currently named after a Slovak priest and politician Michal Miloslav Hodža. During communist era the square was called Mierové námestie.

== Notable features ==
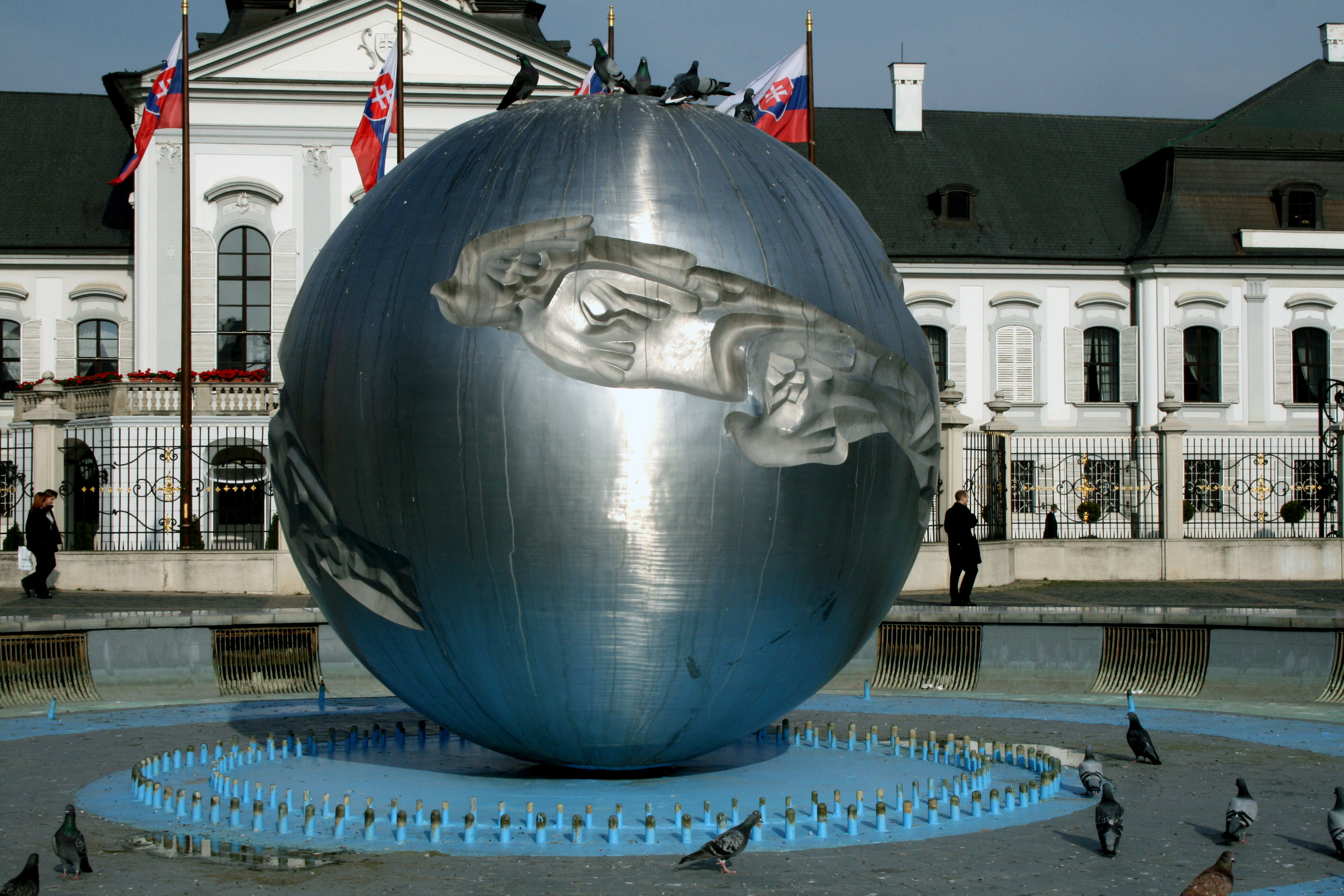
Fountain Earth — planet of peace, the centerpeace of the square and a common meeting point in Bratislava

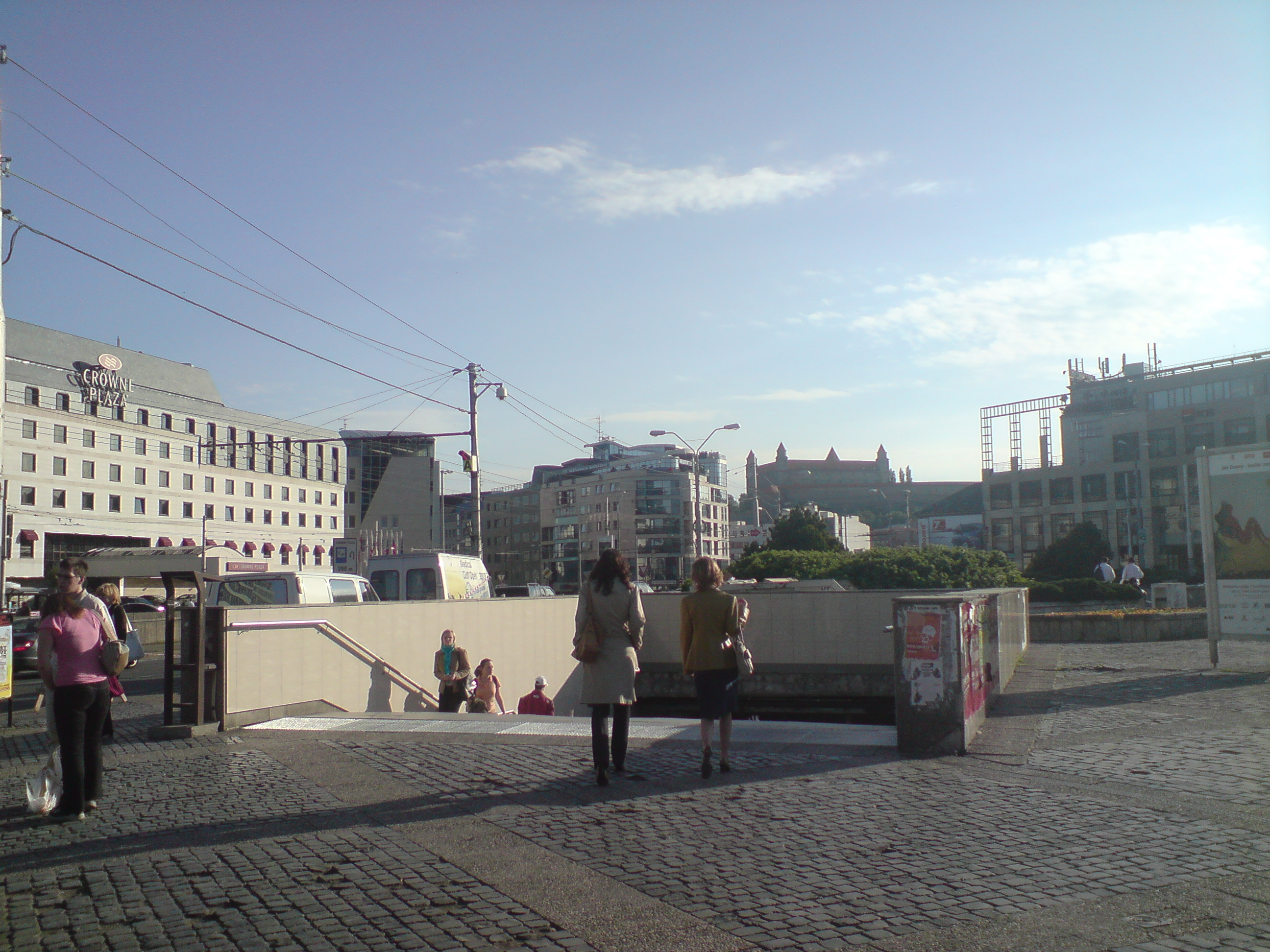
Pedestrian underpass entrance as seen standing in front of the Presidential Palace

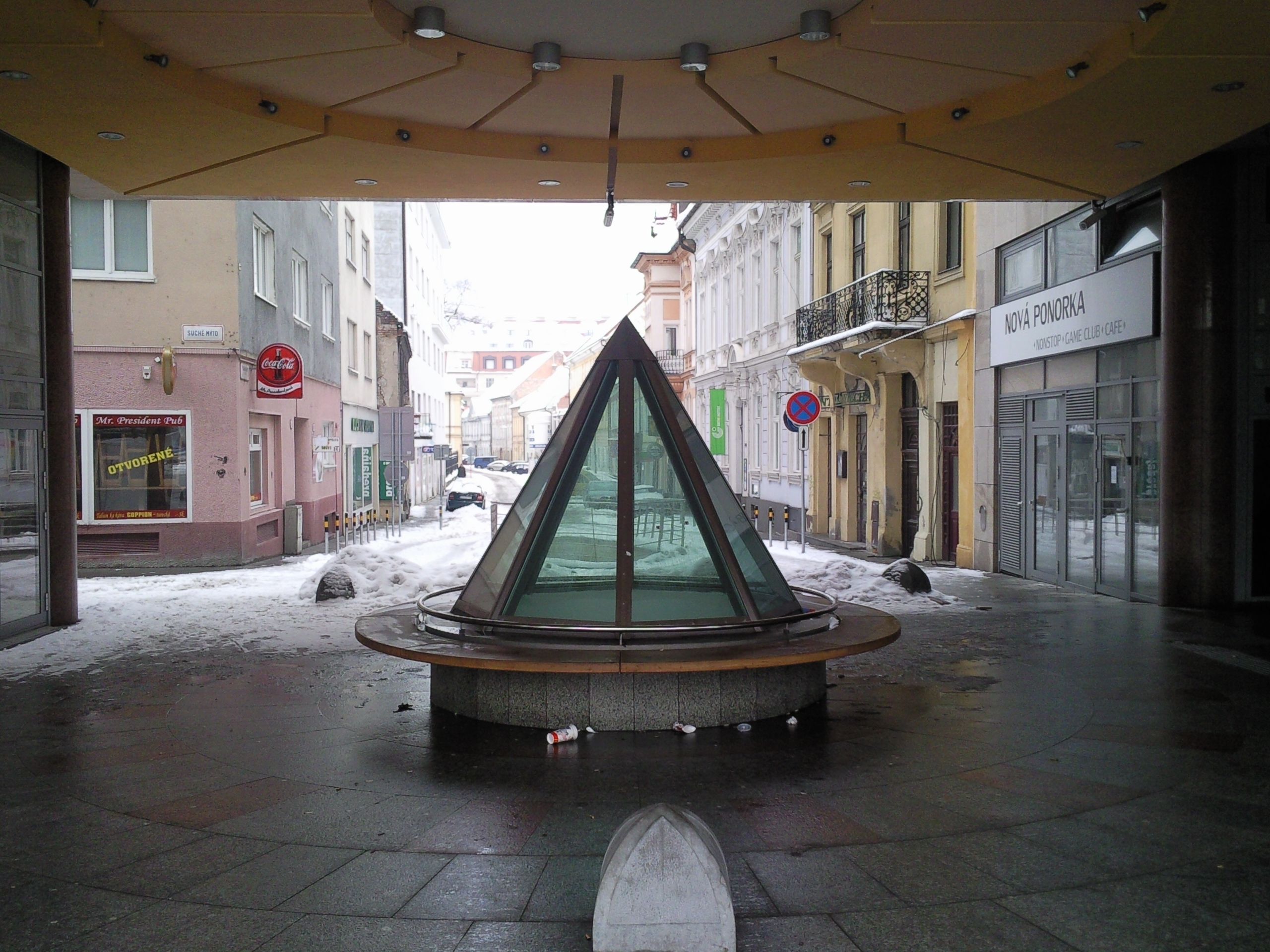
Bus stop under Astoria Palace today, showing the crowded space of this busy stop after the building's construction

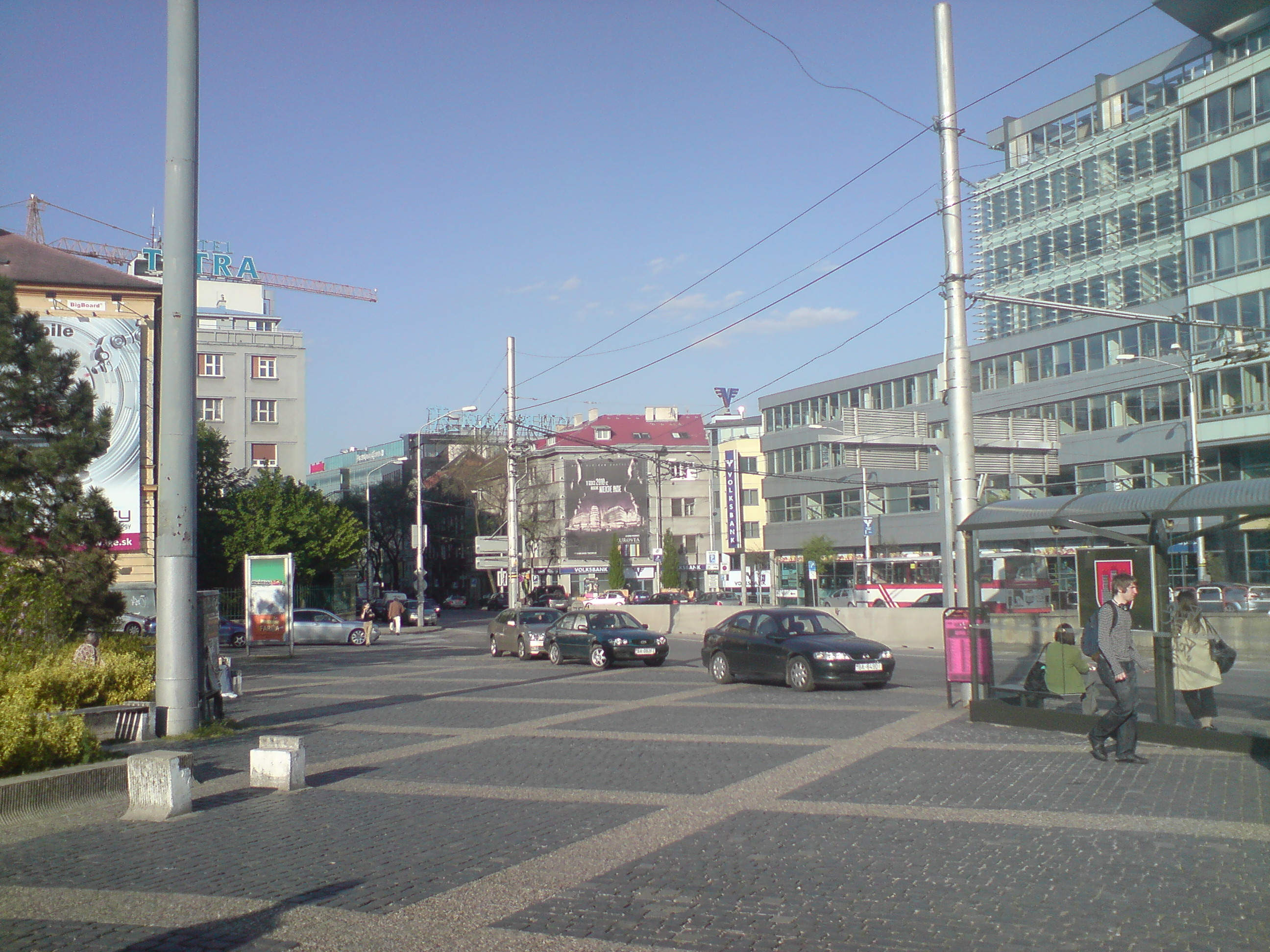
Hodžovo námestie is one of the few places in Bratislava where trolleybuses have their separate stops

== Buildings around the square ==
=== Grassalkovich Palace ===
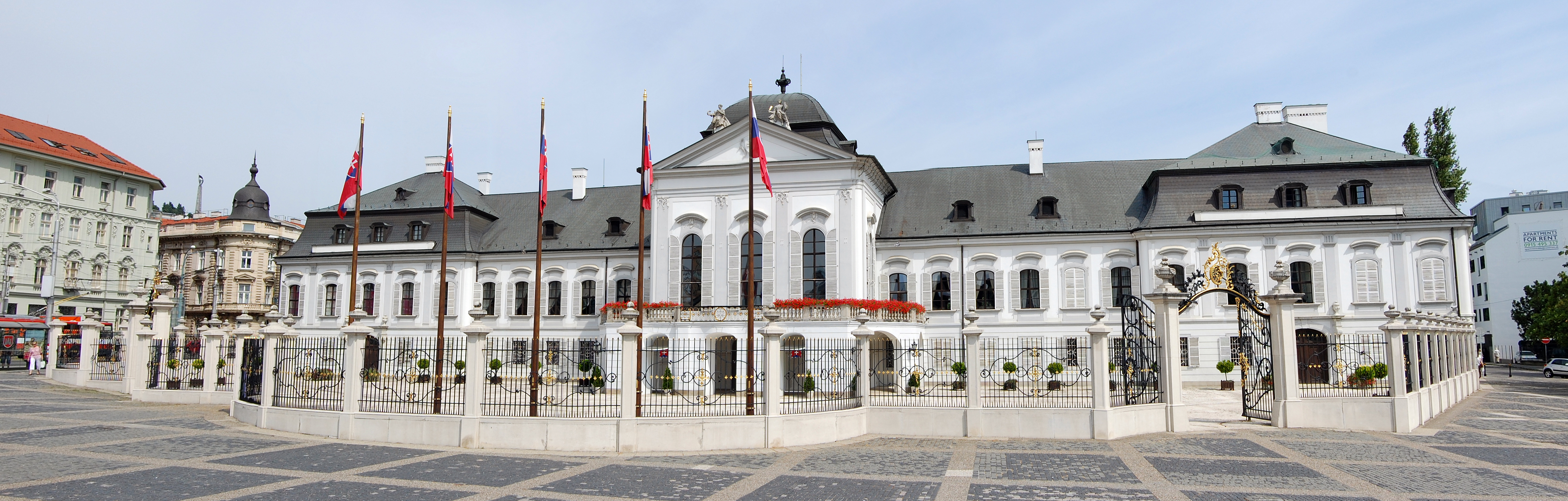
Grassalkovich Palace — today the seat of the President of the Slovak republic.

The building is a Rococo/late Baroque summer palace with a French garden. It was built in 1760 for Count Antal Grassalkovich, a Hungarian noble serving as the head of the Hungarian Chamber (a sort of ministry of economy and finance for the Kingdom of Hungary), by architect Anton Mayerhofer. It features many beautiful rooms and an impressive staircase.

The building became a center of Baroque musical life in Pozsony (Pressburg) and an important part of social life in the city as well. During the 1939–1945 period, the palace was the seat of the clero-fascist president of the First Slovak Republic Jozef Tiso.

During the Communist era, it was first (after 1945) the seat of the Council of Commissioners, then in 1950, the building was turned into the "Klement Gottwald House of Pioneers and Youth" (Dom pionierov a mládeže Klementa Gottwalda), which was an activity center for Bratislava's schoolchildren called pioneers at that time. After its reconstruction in the early 1990s, on 30 September 1996 the palace became the residence of Slovakia's president. Its once-large gardens are now a public park.

=== Astoria Palace ===
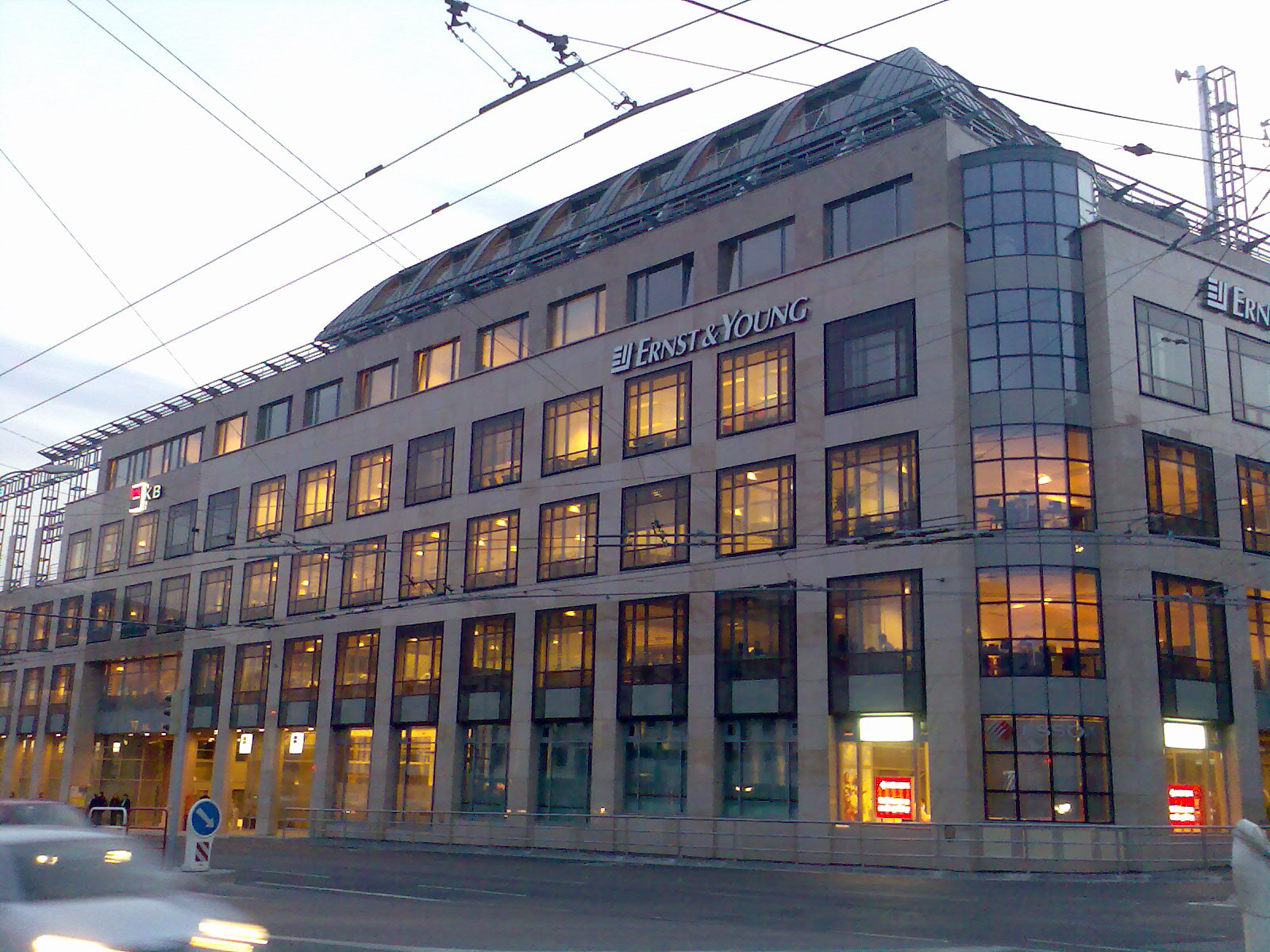
Astoria Palace

Astoria Palace has 7 floors above ground and it includes mostly administrative (office) space, its main tenant being Ernst & Young. It includes a public pedestrian path on the ground floor connecting Palisády Street with Panenská Street with Staromestská Street and it also contains a heavily used public transport bus stop and entrance into the pedestrian underpass below Hodžovo Square.

The structure was planned since 1993 and its construction was delayed several times. The building had to include the entrance to the underpass under the square and coincide with its renovation. The building's investor was I.P.R. Slovakia, a Slovak-Cypriot company. Construction started in October 2004, when traffic restrictions took place in the form of blocking the rightmost driving lane at the square (coming from Štefánikova Street), blocking the major busy street for an astonishing 3 years, until August 2007. The building was completed in 2008, but without finishing the pedestrian underpass. Reconstruction of the underpass was carried out by the Astoria Passage company, a sister company of the Astoria Palace building investor, to which the underpass was rented out for 10 years. After the long delayed opening of the underpass, it was found out that the escalator was making loud noises. Moreover, the underpass remained much the same as when built under socialist realism, with one exception being a significant reduction of space to make more room for small shops. This also meant that there was still no escalator leading to the Presidential Palace and the whole underpass remained off limits to the handicapped, although special platform elevators for the handicapped have later been installed in November 2009.

In place of the building, there was formerly the square itself, meaning mostly empty space consisting of a busy bus stop. In the upper part of the space, there was the entrance to the pedestrian underpass and air conditioning vents blowing hot air in the winter, allowing for people to get some warmth when waiting for their evening or night buses. The area also contained benches to sit while waiting for the bus and constituted a logical ending of the square from its side. Because of this structure, the bus stop shrunk several times and it is now prone to draft, as cold wind sometimes blows through the narrow passages of the Astoria Palace ground floor.

=== Tatracentrum ===
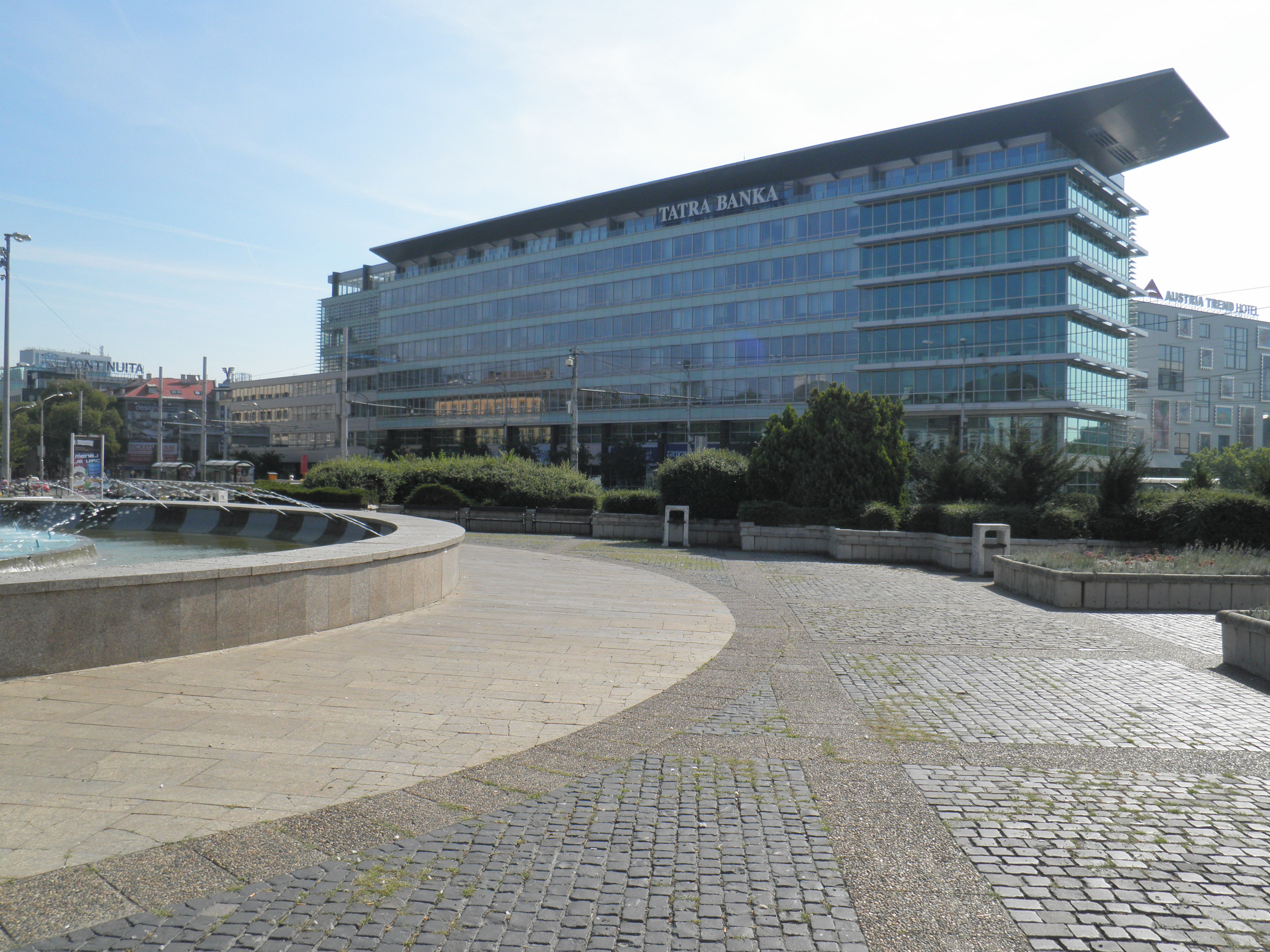
Tatracentrum

Project by Ľubomír Závodný, Matej Siebert, Radomil Kachlík, Peter Vavrica in 1999–2001 Construction started in November 1999 and finished in December 2001. Total occupied space is 3647 meters squared. The building has 8 floors above ground and it includes 343 parking spaces (127 restricted and 216 accessible to the public). The building serves as the headquarters of Slovak bank Tatra banka. The ground floor includes a small shopping gallery and a supermarket, the first underground floor features cafes and restaurants.

After its construction, the building is considered to have changed the square drastically. Even years after its construction, when all of the space around the square has been used, the Tatracentrum building dominates the Hodžovo Square. The structure's aesthetics is also considered unpleasant and unsuited for its location in the historical center of Bratislava. Consequently, the building is hated by many inhabitants of the Slovak capital. Upper floors of the building offer unique views of the square, but except for the ground floor and underground floors, the building is inaccessible to the public.

=== Former hotel forum ===
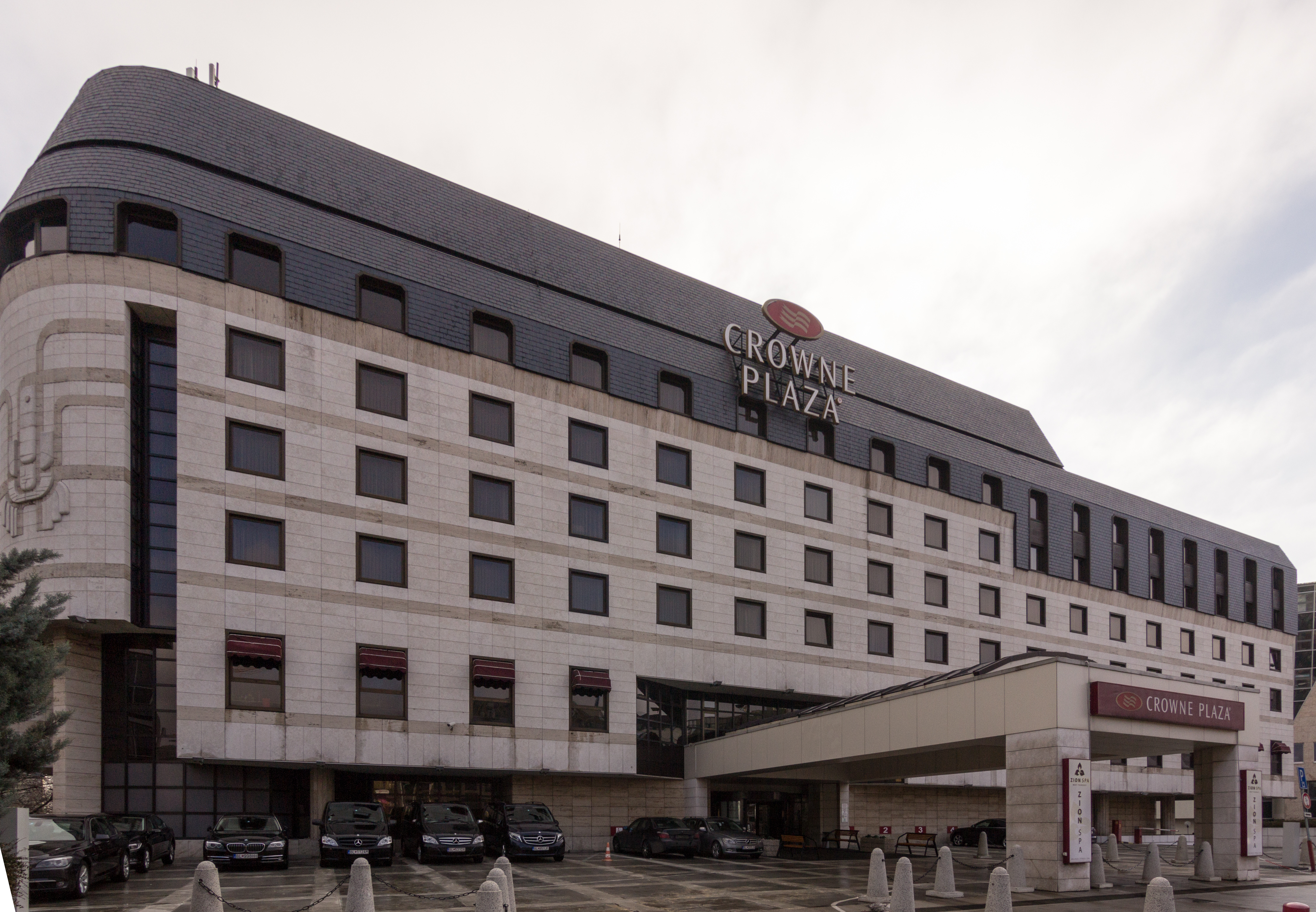
Hotel Crowne Plaza (formerly Hotel Forum)

This post-modern hotel building was finished in 1989. The project is by Julián Hauskrecht and others (Boris Džadoň, Štefan Ďurkovič, Juraj Herman, Dušan Krepop, Ján Poláček, Pavol Suchánek) with additional input into the interior design by Alain Marcot and Slobodanka Dragovičová.

The building is U-shaped; its main entrance is situated towards the square, the hotel part faces Poštová Street and a small square (forum) faces Obchodná Street.

In 2004, the building was sold by the Slovak Republic to the Dutch company Myria Assets for 425 million Slovak crowns. Today, the hotel is called Crowne Plaza.

== Future construction ==
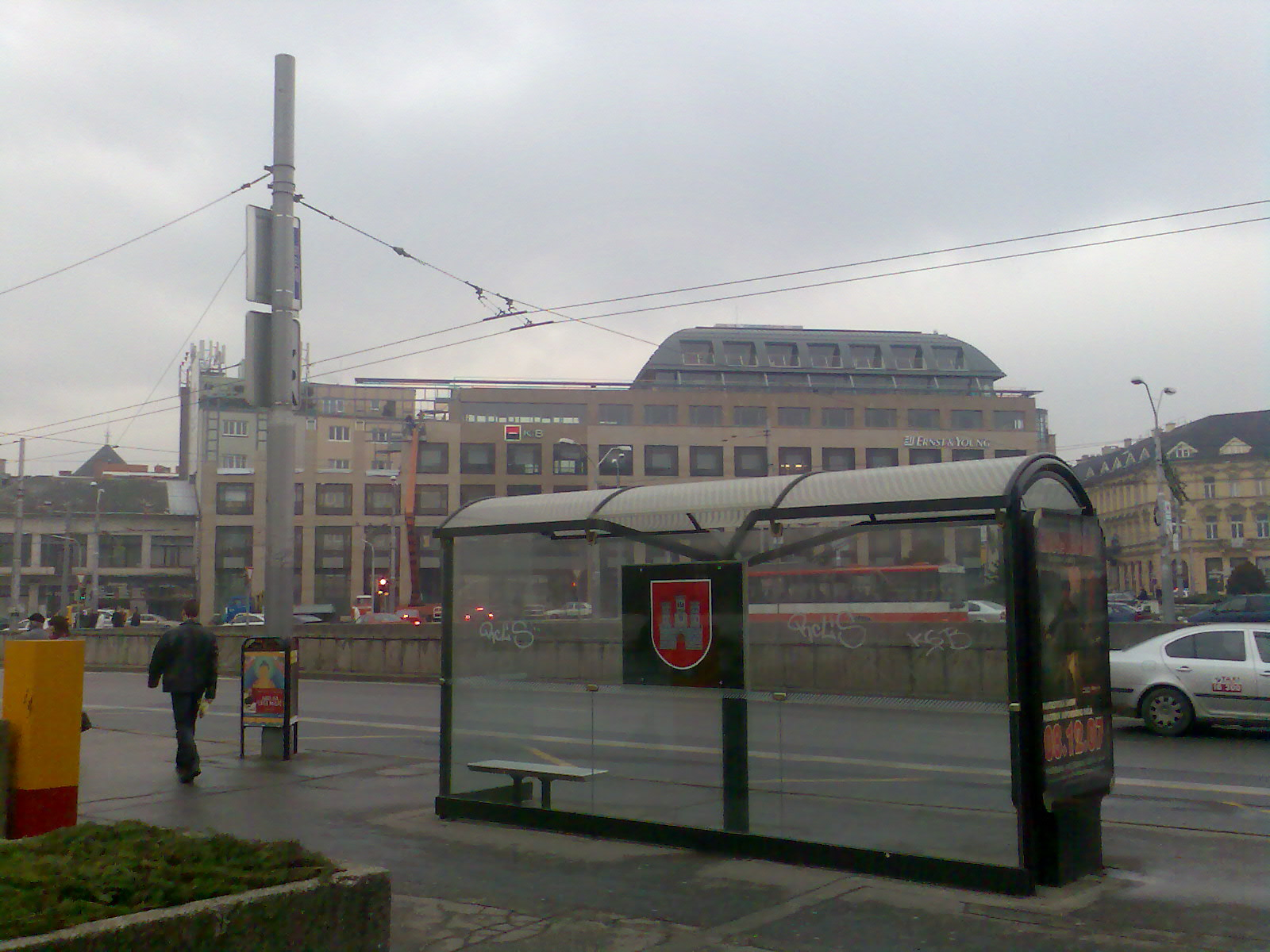
Trolleybus stop at Hodžovo Square, today the lower part of the picture (including the patch of grass) is behind a fence

After the building of Astoria Palace, the last place on the square where a structure can be placed is the trolleybus stop next to Tatracentrum, more specifically its extension over the pedestrian underpass mouth towards Poštová Street. Since its construction, the space contained benches to sit while waiting for a trolleybus and some greenery. Except for additional sitting space, it was used by citizens of Bratislava to disperse a little bit at an often crowded public transport stop and it allowed for pleasant views over the busy Poštová Street.

In 2006 a company named Alto Invest was supposed to start construction here. The Old Town construction office postponed the construction permission until December 31, 2011. Plans were changed several times. Currently, the building should have 3 floors. The whole area was fenced and access was prohibited to the public since mid-2010. However, the construction has not started yet.

Despite running out of space around the square, head architect of Bratislava Štefan Šlachta is the proponent of another building placed directly inside the small square at the place of trolleybus stop opposite Tatracentrum. The building should be a little smaller than Grassalkovich Palace. There are no current plans to construct this building.

== Access ==
The square serves as an important public transport hub in Bratislava. Both buses, night buses and trolleybuses stop here.
