= Zlaté Piesky =

Lake in Slovakia

Zlaté piesky
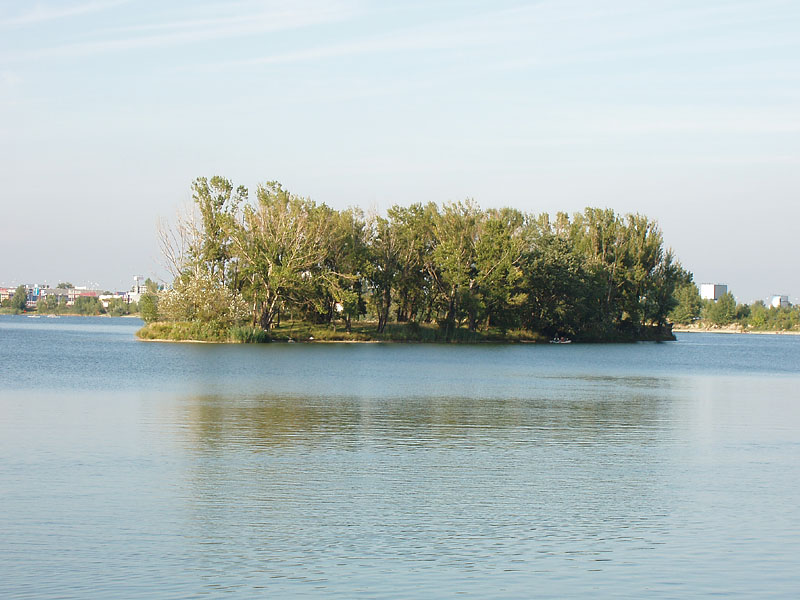
- Zlaté piesky in June 2007

- Location within Slovakia
- Coordinates: 48°11′05″N 17°11′22″E
- Basin countries: Slovakia
- Settlements: Bratislava

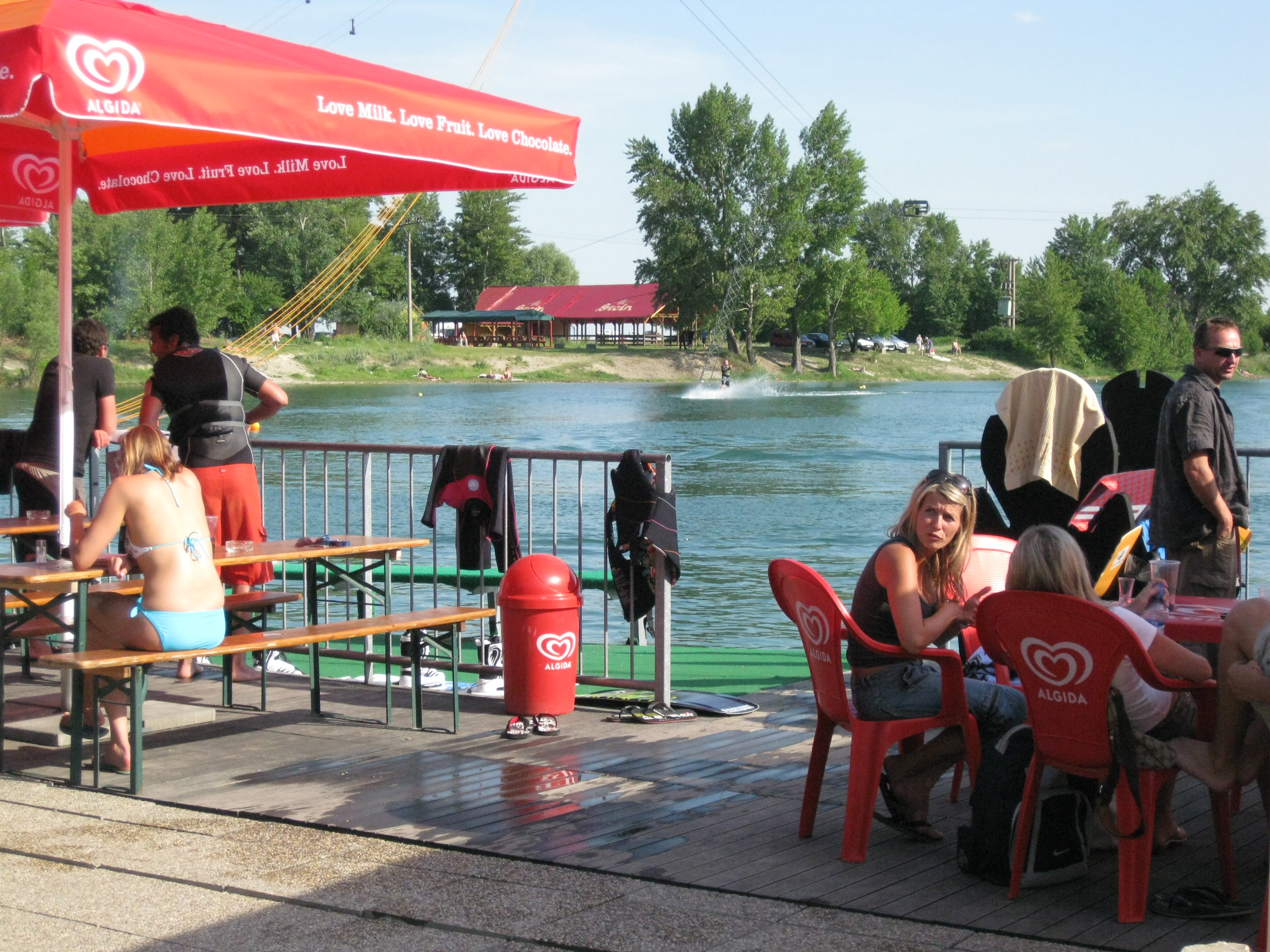
Zlaté Piesky in summer 2009

Zlaté Piesky (literally Golden Sands) is a lake and a summer resort in northeastern Bratislava, Slovakia, near the D1 motorway.

The northern part of the area features a recreational facility known as the Areál zdravia Zlaté Piesky (Zlaté Piesky area of health), operated by the municipal organization "STARZ." This facility provides beaches for swimming, water sports such as boat and paddleboard rentals, water slides, tennis, table tennis, beach volleyball, and buffets. It also hosts regular concerts and music festivals. A shopping center is within walking distance.

There is a restaurant, beach bar and water ski-tow on the northern shore.

Access to the southern shore is free, the southern waters are suitable for swimming and fishing.

The lake is approachable for visitors by public transport (bus, tram) as there is a nearby "Zlaté Piesky" stop. Car parking is available on parking places and off-road.

The lake was created back in the 50s, as a surface gravel mining pit, filled with groundwater. Its water surface area has an irregular shape (1,0 km long, 340-900 meters wide), with it´s water column reaching 11 metres.

== The 1976 crash ==
On 28 July 1976, Zlaté Piesky witnessed one of the most deadly airplane crashes in the history of Czechoslovakia. A Czechoslovak Airlines plane en route from Prague to Bratislava failed to land at the nearby airport and crashed into the lake. Seventy passengers and six crew members died.

== Aerial photos and maps ==
- 48°11′05″N 17°11′22″E
- "satellite view of Zlaté piesky" (Map). Google Maps.
