= Námestie Slobody =

Square in Bratislava

Coordinates: 48°09′08″N 17°06′42″E

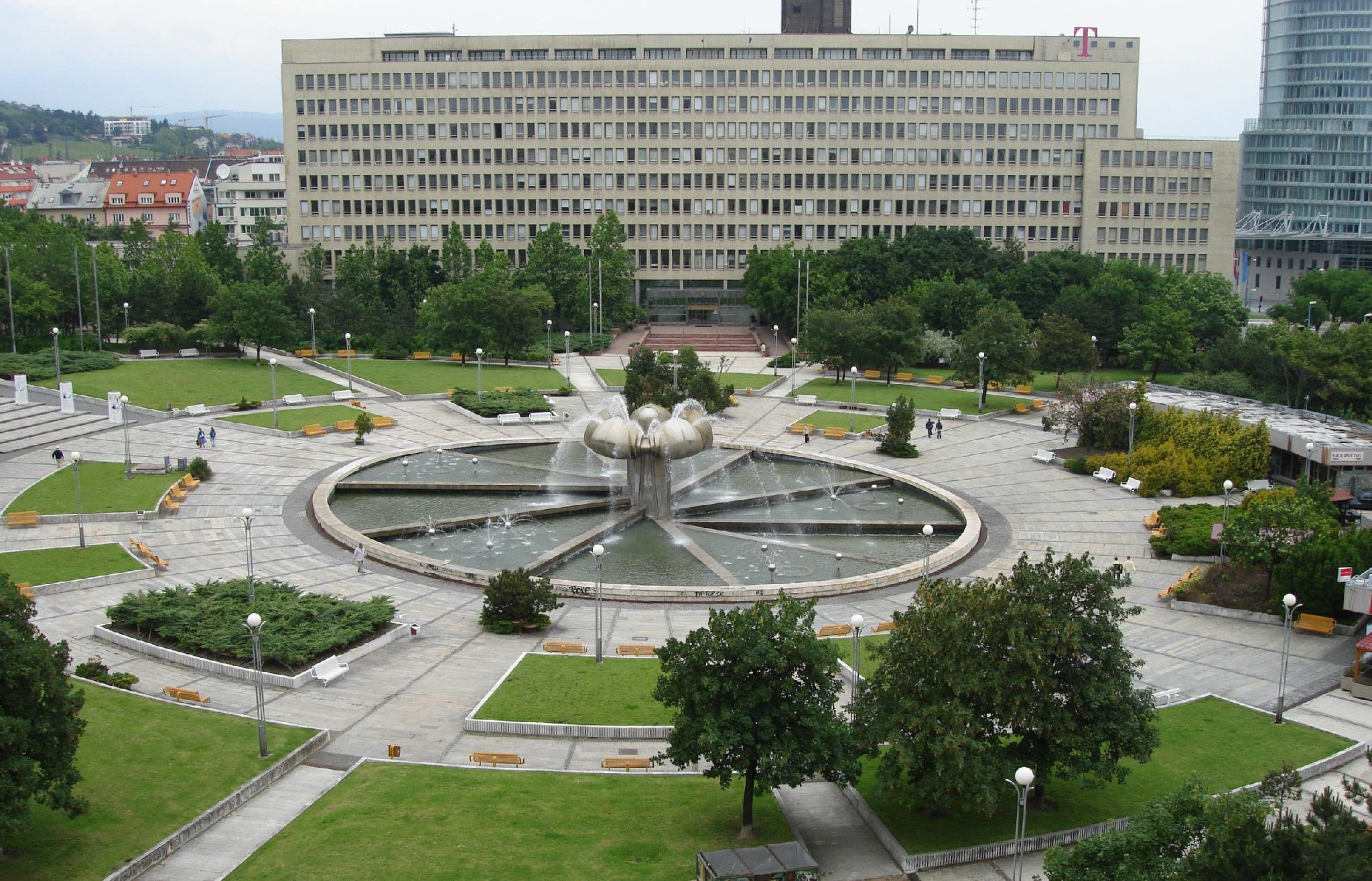
Námestie Slobody and Post office palace (Ministry of Transport, Posts and Telecommunications of the Slovak Republic) as seen from the Faculty of architecture of Slovak Technical University.

Námestie Slobody (Freedom Square), locally referred to as Gotko, is a major city square in the Old Town of Bratislava, the capital of Slovakia. It is situated in the wider city center, close to Kollárovo square and in front of the Summer Archbishop's Palace.

== History ==
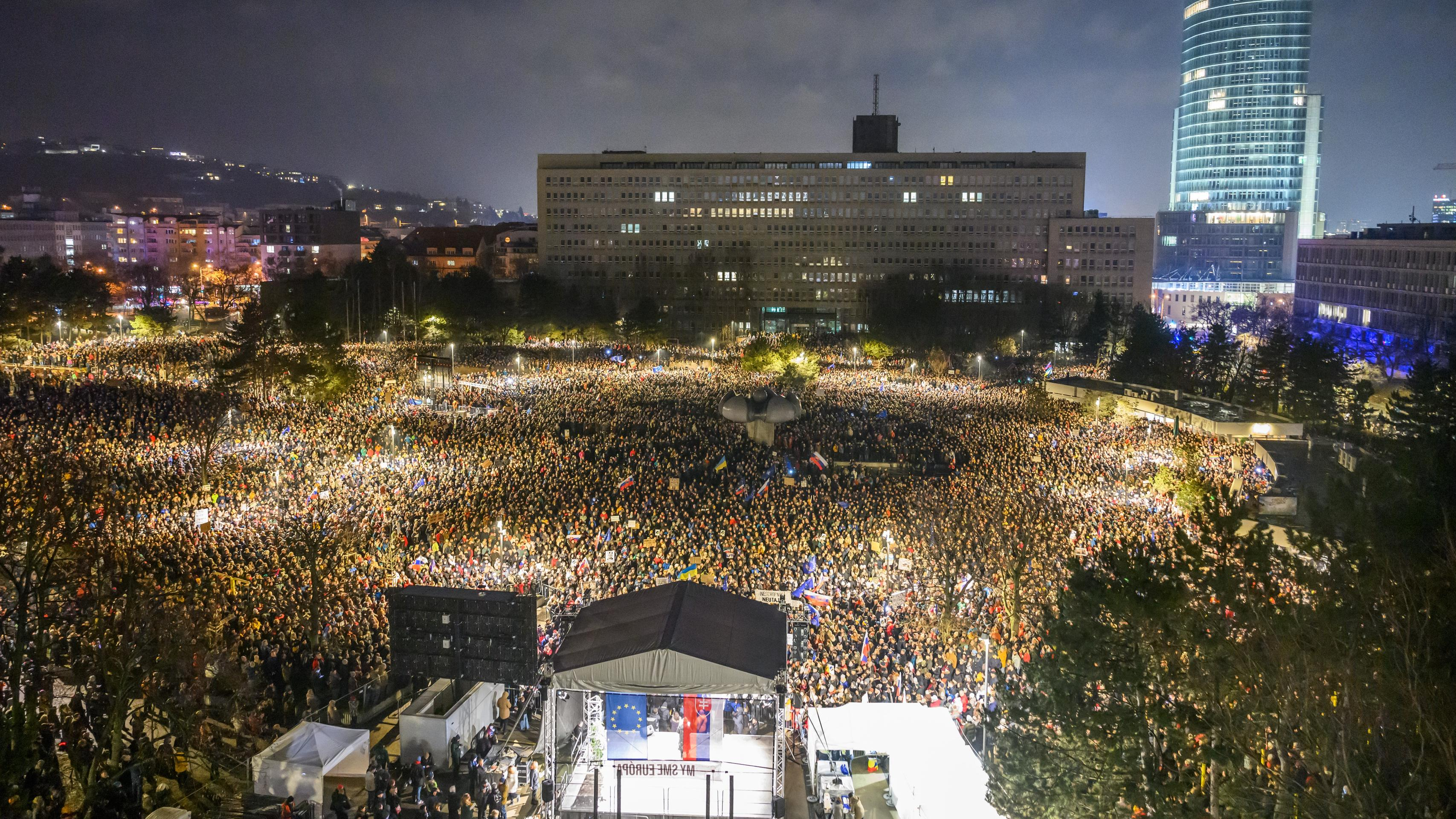
About 60,000 Slovaks gathered in the square in January 2025 to protest against the pro-Russian policies of Slovak Prime Minister Robert Fico

The location of the current square was covered with vineyards during medieval times. It probably originated in the 17th century, with the Summer Archbishop's Palace which was built there. It currently houses the Slovak government. Later it was rebuilt as a grass area, which was divided by an alley of trees. It was called Kniežacie or Fürstenallee and Hercegfasor. The Slovak expression Firšnál originated from Fürstenallee.

The square was called Gottwaldovo during socialism in honor of the first Czechoslovak communist president Klement Gottwald, whose statue was included. The Post Office palace (the biggest post office in the world) and buildings of Slovak Technical University were built there during the 1940s and 1950s, closing the square in from all sides. The biggest fountain in Bratislava stands there, which was built in 1980. It was one of the first squares in Bratislava that was renamed after the Velvet Revolution in 1989.

== Fountain of Union ==
The square's centerpiece is the Fountain of Union (Slovak: Fontána Družby), built from 1979 to 1980 by sculptors Juraj Hovorka, Tibor Bártfay, Karol Lacko and architects Virgil Droppa and Juraj Hlavica. It is the biggest fountain in Bratislava and in the whole Slovak Republic. The fountain consists of a basin and a 9 meters tall sculpture of a linden flower weighing 12 tons.

The fountain features a tunnel and a relatively large machine room, located underneath the fountain. Due to water continually entering the underground control spaces because of lack of maintenance after the fall of Communism in 1989, the technological and electrical parts of the fountain are severely damaged. The hydroisolation of the basin is damaged as well.

In 2007 water stopped flowing from the fountain and its restoration would cost an estimated 1 million euros. Since 2010, when plans to reconstruct the whole square emerged, the Fountain of Union is not included in any of these plans. The only institution to publicly declare its support to include the fountain in the future is Paming a municipal company that is in the process of ceasing operation.

In June 2023 water began flowing again after the fountain was fully restored with a new fountain system. People are now allowed to step inside the fountain. The square also received new lights and more greenery.

== See also ==
- History of Bratislava
