= Pavel Mikšík =

Slovak architect

- Born: Pavel P. Mikšík; July 27, 1943; Bratislava, Slovakia
- Known for: Designer

Pavel Mikšík (born July 27, 1943) is a Slovak architect and designer working in the field of fountain design.

== Biography ==
Pavel Mikšík was born in Bratislava, Slovakia. He was introduced to fine arts in early childhood by his father. In school he excelled in both drawing and technical subjects. He decided on the Faculty of Architecture at the Slovak University of Technology in Bratislava. Mikšík changed to the Department of Sculpture at the Academy of Fine Arts and Design in Bratislava. He graduated in 1968.

== Early works ==
After graduation Mikšík won another First prize, this time for Dr. Clementis Memorial.

== Contemporary works ==
Mikšík has specialised in the creation of fountains, from interior and drinking fountains to large-scale monumental pieces.

== Memberships ==
Mikšík is a member of Professional Artist Group ART-CLUB+8. He takes part in annual exhibitions. He works and lives near Bratislava, Slovakia.

== List of major works ==
- 2006 – Monument with light effects in Záhorská Bystrica (Slovakia)
- 2005 – Fountain in the Main Square in Šamorín (Slovakia)
- 1995 – Fountain in the historical square in Dolný Kubín (Slovakia)
- 1993 – Fountain for the Karlskrohn Town Hall (Germany)
- 1993 – Fountain in Cham (Germany)

== Exhibitions ==
- (1995) Pictures and Bronze Figures - Ingolstadt (Germany)
- (1988) Artprotis - Newark (USA)
- (1982) Bronze Figures - Zurich (Switzerland)
