= Ivan Matušík =

Slovak architect (1930–2022)

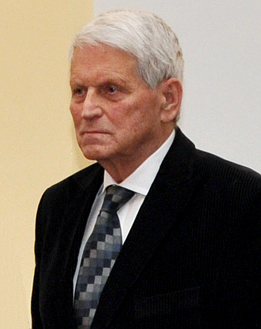
- Matušík in 2012
- Born: 12 July 1930; Bratislava, Czechoslovakia
- Died: 20 February 2022 (aged 91)
- Occupation: Architect

Ivan Matušík (12 July 1930 – 20 February 2022) was a Slovak architect.

== Life and career ==
Born in Bratislava, a pupil of Emil Belluš, in 1953 Matušík graduated in architecture at the Slovak University of Technology in Bratislava and then started working at the Bratislava City Office and later at the Bratislava Military Design Institute (Vojenského Projektového Ústavu). In 1961 he joined the State Project Institute of Commerce (Štátnom projektovom ústave obchodu, ŠPUO), serving as its director from 1968 to 1989.

A functionalist, he designed a large number of iconic Bratislava buildings, including the Shopping Center Slimák (1960 - 1964), the Prior Department Store (1968), and the Kyjev Hotel (1973). Often criticized by authorities and senior colleagues for being an imitator of Western architecture and for being too formalistic, after the 1968 Soviet invasion of Czechoslovakia he faced a serious backlash and some of his buildings got destroyed.

During his life he was the recipient of various honors and accolades, including four Dušan Jurkovič Awards, a Crystal Wing Award and the 2003 CE.ZA.AR Award.

Beyond his activity as an architect, Matušík served as a professor at his alma mater from 1976 to 1980 and was the founder and an editor of the journal of architecture Projekt.

Matušík was married to architect Gabriela Churová. He died on 20 February 2022, at the age of 91.
