= Hviezdoslavovo námestie =

Town square in Bratislava, Slovakia

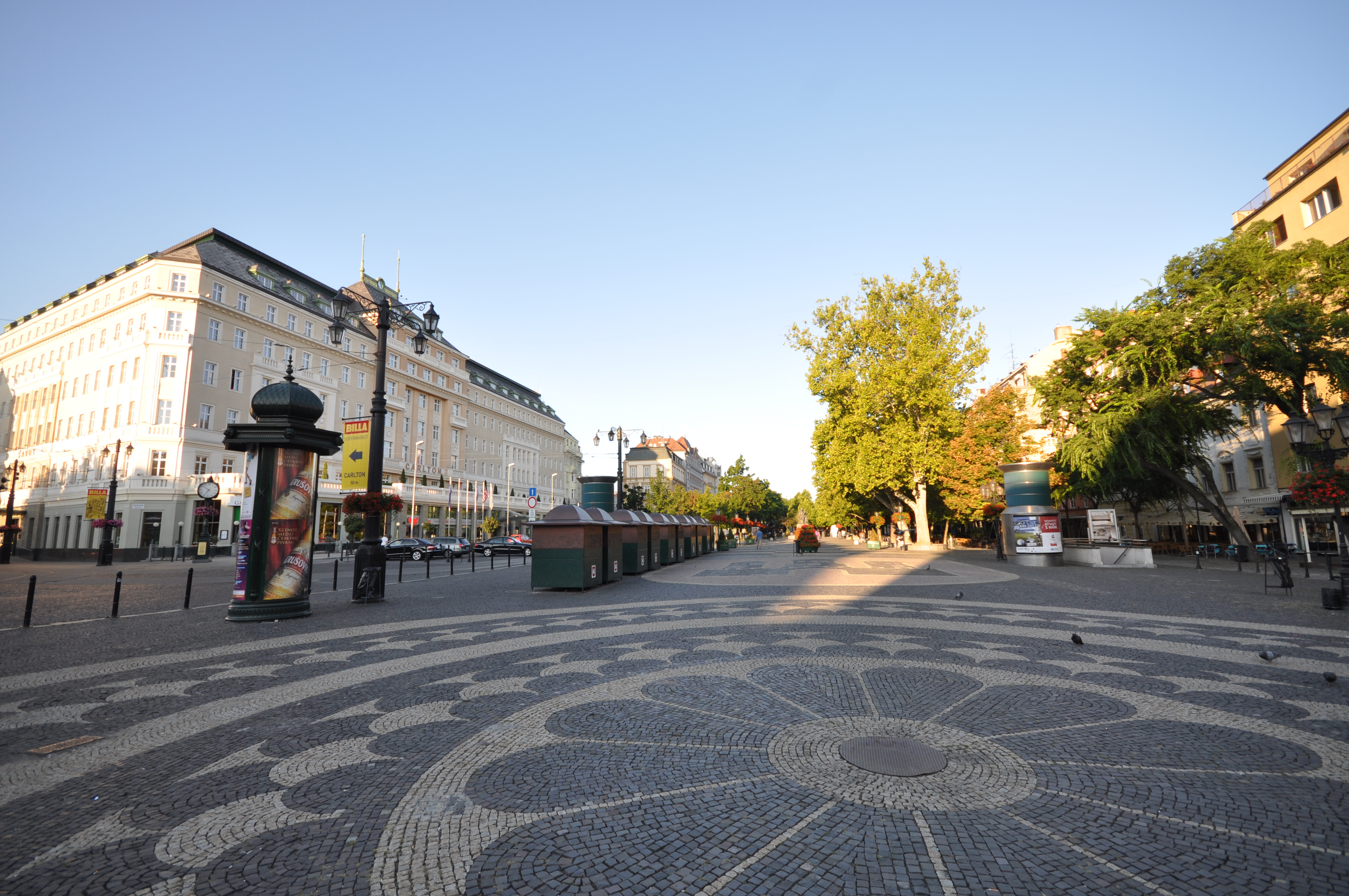

- Location within Bratislava
- Namesake: Pavol Országh Hviezdoslav
- Location: Bratislava
- Quarter: Old Town
- Coordinates: 48°08′30″N 17°06′30″E

Hviezdoslavovo námestie ('Hviezdoslav Square') is a town square in Bratislava. It is located in the Old Town, between the Nový Most bridge and the Slovak National Theatre. The square is named after Pavol Országh Hviezdoslav.

== History ==
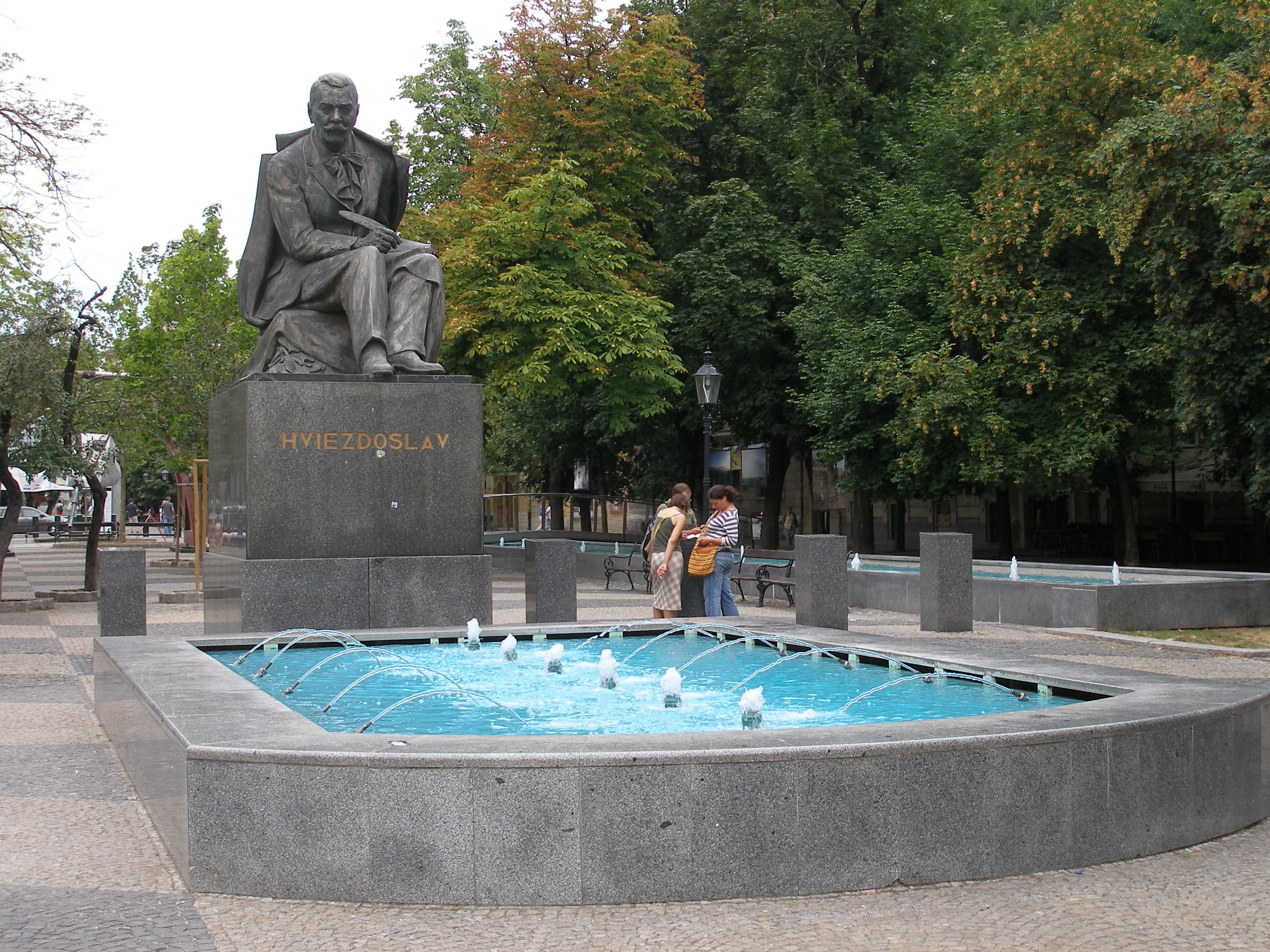
Statue of Hviezdoslav

Previous names of the square include: (Hungarian: Kossuth Lajos tér-German: Kossuth Lajos platz, Hungarian: Radetzky tér-German: Radetzky platz, Hungarian: Séta tér-German: Promenade)

Many medieval houses were built there. The northern part contains the houses Kőszeghy, Eszterházy, Széchenyi, Stáhl, Záborszky, Pálffy, Sulkovszky Maldeghem, Malatinszky, and Werner. The southern part holds the houses Spineger, Gervay, Löw-Palugyay, Kozics, Wigand, Adler, Pollák, and Sprinzl. The most notable buildings are the Cathédrale Notre Dame Cloister and Slovak National Theatre, which can be found in the eastern part. Earlier, the most important noblemen sent their daughters to learn in this cloister, for example, Pálffy, Forgách, Harrach and Lichtenstein.

On 17 March 1848, Hungarian national leader Lajos Kossuth proclaimed from Hotel Zöldfa to the assembling mass because Ferdinand V signed March laws at the Primate's Palace last day. The first Hungarian fencing school's practicing hall was there. Lajos Kossuth, Franz Joseph, Albert Einstein, and Alfred Nobel stayed at this hotel. This hotel was today's HotelCarlton's place.

In 1911, Sándor Petőfi's sculpture was erected opposite what became Slovak National Theatre. It was unsuccessfully attacked with dynamite after the Czechoslovak army occupied the city in 1918. After this event, the sculpture was boarded over until its removal.

The square underwent major reconstruction at the end of the 20th century. Before reconstruction, it looked like a small city park; now it looks like a city promenade.

On 24 February 2005, US President George W. Bush gave a public speech in Hviezdoslav Square during his visit to Bratislava for the Slovakia Summit 2005 with Russian President Vladimir Putin.

== Configuration ==
The square is primarily a pedestrian zone with a lot of green. A podium occupies the central part for cultural events, and two parallel fountains run along the square. Close to the theatre is the larger than life-sized statue of Hviezdoslav.

== Notable buildings ==
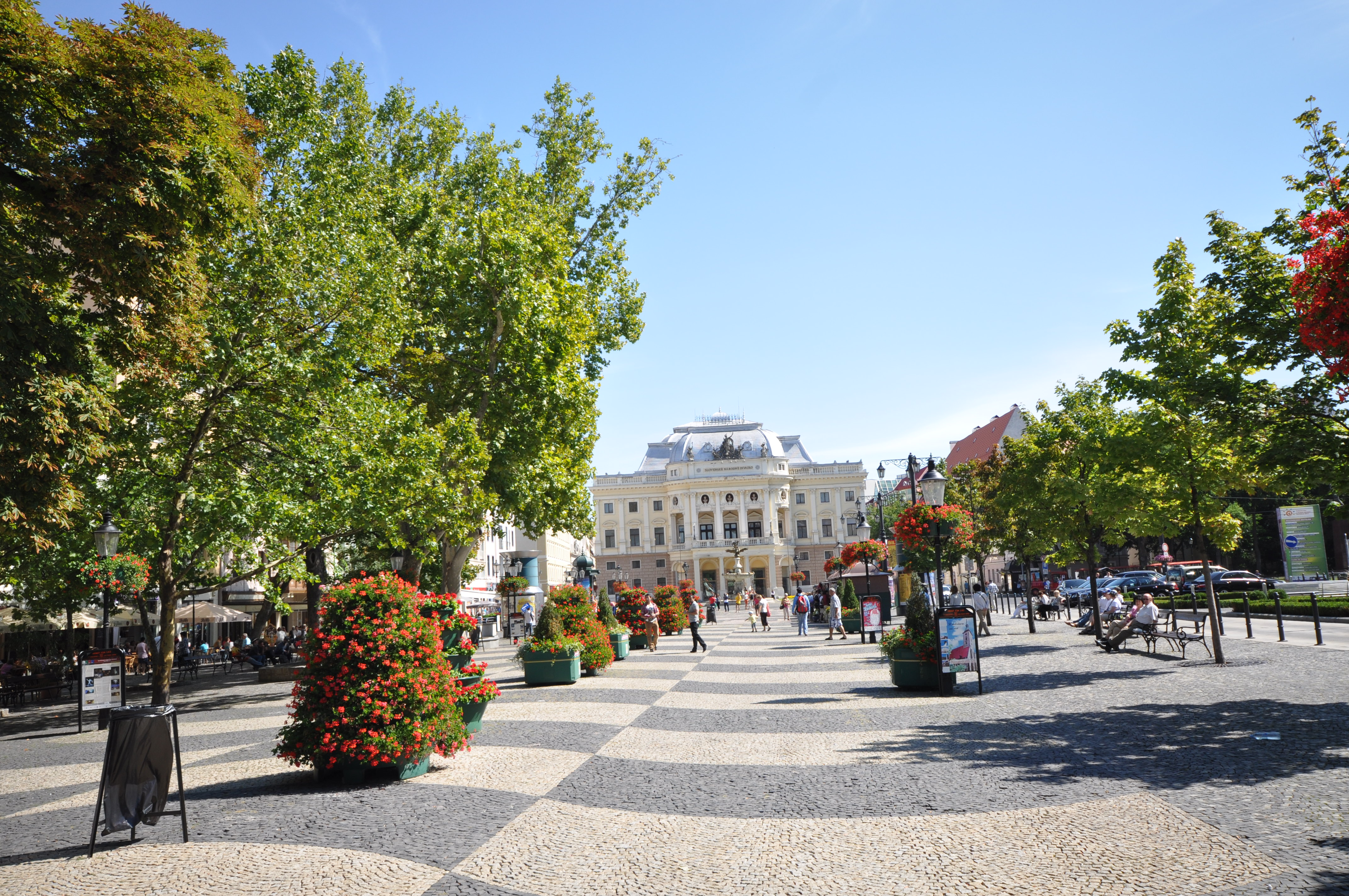
Building of the Slovak National Theatre (opera)

One building in the square is the old headquarters of the Slovak National Theatre (opera). On the southern side are the Radisson Blu Carlton Hotel, as well as the German and American embassies. On the northern side are many bars and restaurants.
