= Bratislavský lesný park =

Forest in Slovakia

Coordinates: 48°12′19″N 17°05′35″E

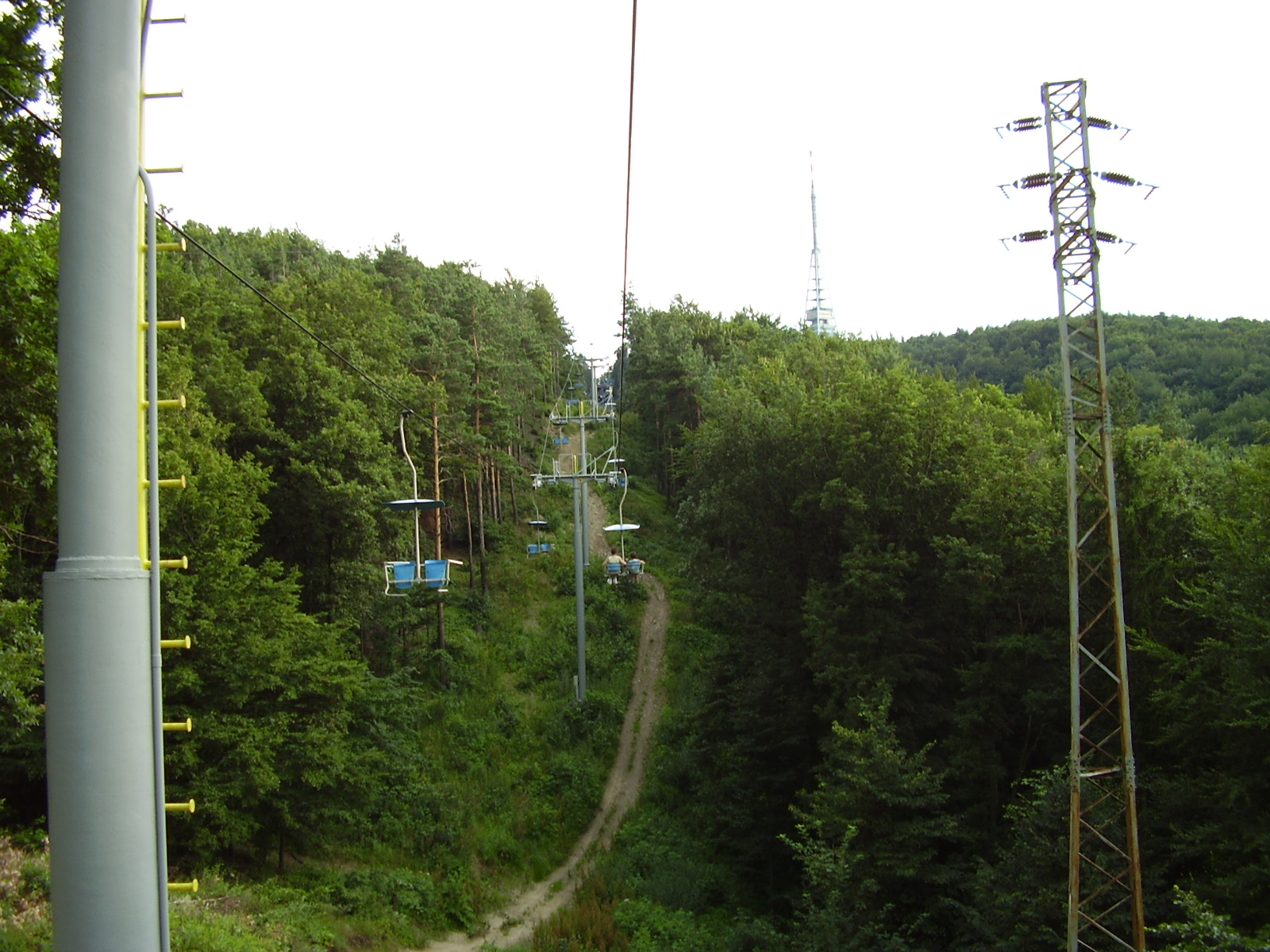
A chairlift to Kamzík from the Vydrica valley, with the Kamzík TV Tower in the background

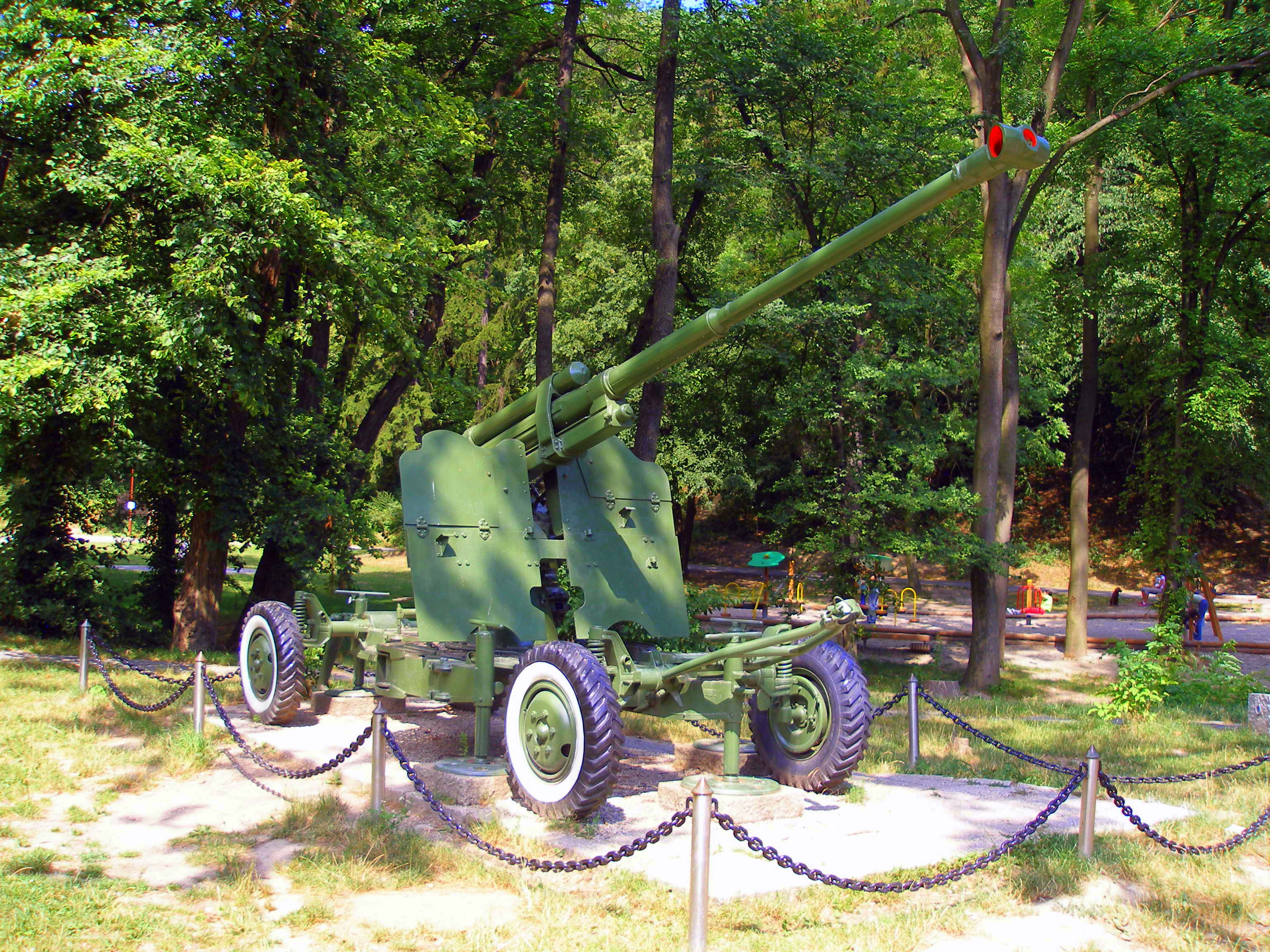
World War II artillery at Partizánska lúka.

Bratislavský lesný park or Bratislava Forest Park is a forest park (actually a forest) in Bratislava, the capital of Slovakia, located in the foothills of the Little Carpathians. Officially, it is part of numerous boroughs of Bratislava: Dúbravka, Karlova Ves, Záhorská Bystrica, Vinohrady, Old Town, New Town and Rača. The park is administered by Mestské lesy v Bratislave (Bratislava City Forests), a specialized non-profit organization (Slovak: samostatne hospodáriaca príspevková organizácia hlavného mesta SR Bratislavy). It covers an area of 27.3 km² (10.54 mi²), of which 96% is covered with forests; the rest consists of meadows, water and built-up areas. The Vydrica river originates in the park's territory.

With its dense network of hiking trails, roads and recreational facilities, Bratislava Forest Park includes many localities popular among visitors, such as Železná studienka (Little iron well), Partizánska lúka (Partisan meadow), Koliba and the Kamzík TV Tower. Two-thirds of visitors enter the Bratislava Forest Park through the Červený most area near Patrónka, a major transport junction in the city. The park is served by the Železná studienka Bratislava train station, the public city transport and parking is provided for up to 150 vehicles.

== History ==
The area of the Bratislava Forest Park has been inhabited since the Paleolithic age by hunter-gatherers. Neolithic age brought the transition to farming marking the beginning of human transformation of the local environment. Iron Age brought the usage of iron and numerous tribe movements, often conducting warfare in the areas they were moving into. Notable ethnic groups from this time include the Celts and the Quadi, the latter had to divide their power with the Roman Empire, whose northern border was the Danube river, just south of the area of today's Bratislava Forest Park. The Romans exploited the natural resources across their border, hunting larger animals and cutting down the primeval forest, transporting the wood on the Danube downstream to their military camps and provinces. The Romans also introduced viticulture into the region that would be famous for its wines later, in the Middle Ages.

== Division ==
- Sitina
- Partizánska lúka
- Železná studienka
- Kamzík

== Description ==
=== Flora ===
The park flora belongs to the Western Carpathians flora (Carpaticum occidentale) and into its part Praecarpaticum slovacum. The area is densely forested, original trees are oak and beech. Other plants include field maple, and elderberry.

=== Fauna ===
Animals within the park boundaries belong to the Palearctic realm. Notable arthropods include Lucanus cervus, Carabus variolosus, rarely also Rosalia alpina, Cerambyx cerdo and Osmoderma eremita. Dragonflies (Odonata) are abundant, notable species include Cordulegaster heros, one of the biggest dragonflies in Slovakia. Its larvae live in the river Vydrica sediments. Notable crustaceans (Crustacea) include the rare Austropotamobius torrentium, also living in the Vydrica.

There is insufficient data on fish species but they appear to be rather insignificant, bigger species have been artificially introduced for human fishing. Amphibians and reptiles include Salamandra salamandra, Rana temporaria, Bufo bufo and Rana esculenta, rarely also other species such as Hyla arborea, Rana dalmatina, etc. Reptiles include the numerous Anguis fragilis and the much rarer Lacerta agilis, Lacerta viridis, Elaphe longissima, and extremely rarely also Coronella austriaca and Natrix natrix.

There have been over 50 bird species recognized within the park, including Falco cherrug, Pernis apivorus and Strix aluco. There are 14 identified bat species, the order insectivora includes Sorex araneus, Talpa europaea and Erinaceus europaeus. Rodents include Clethrionomys glareolus, Apodemus sylvaticus, Sciurus vulgaris and Glis glis. Larger animals include the numerous Capreolus capreolus, Sus scrofa, Vulpes vulpes, Martes martes, Martes foina, Mustela nivalis and the rare Ovis aries, Dama dama, Cervus elaphus, Meles meles, Lepus europaeus and Lutra lutra (probably only a few individuals). There are no wolves or bears in the park.

=== Hunting ===
The whole area of the Bratislava Forest Park is an official, active hunting ground. There are seven crops fields for wild animals, three Red deer feeders, 25 Roe deer feeders and 16 hunter's watch towers. There is no hunter's lodge in the park.

Hunting is managed by the Bratislava City Forests (Slovak: Mestské lesy v Bratislave) using their own hunters and eight hunting dogs. The company also sells hunting tickets. Fishing is managed by the Bratislava subsidiary of the Slovak fisher's union in Žilina (Slovak: Slovenský rybársky zväz v Žiline, mestská organizácia v Bratislave).

== Tourism ==
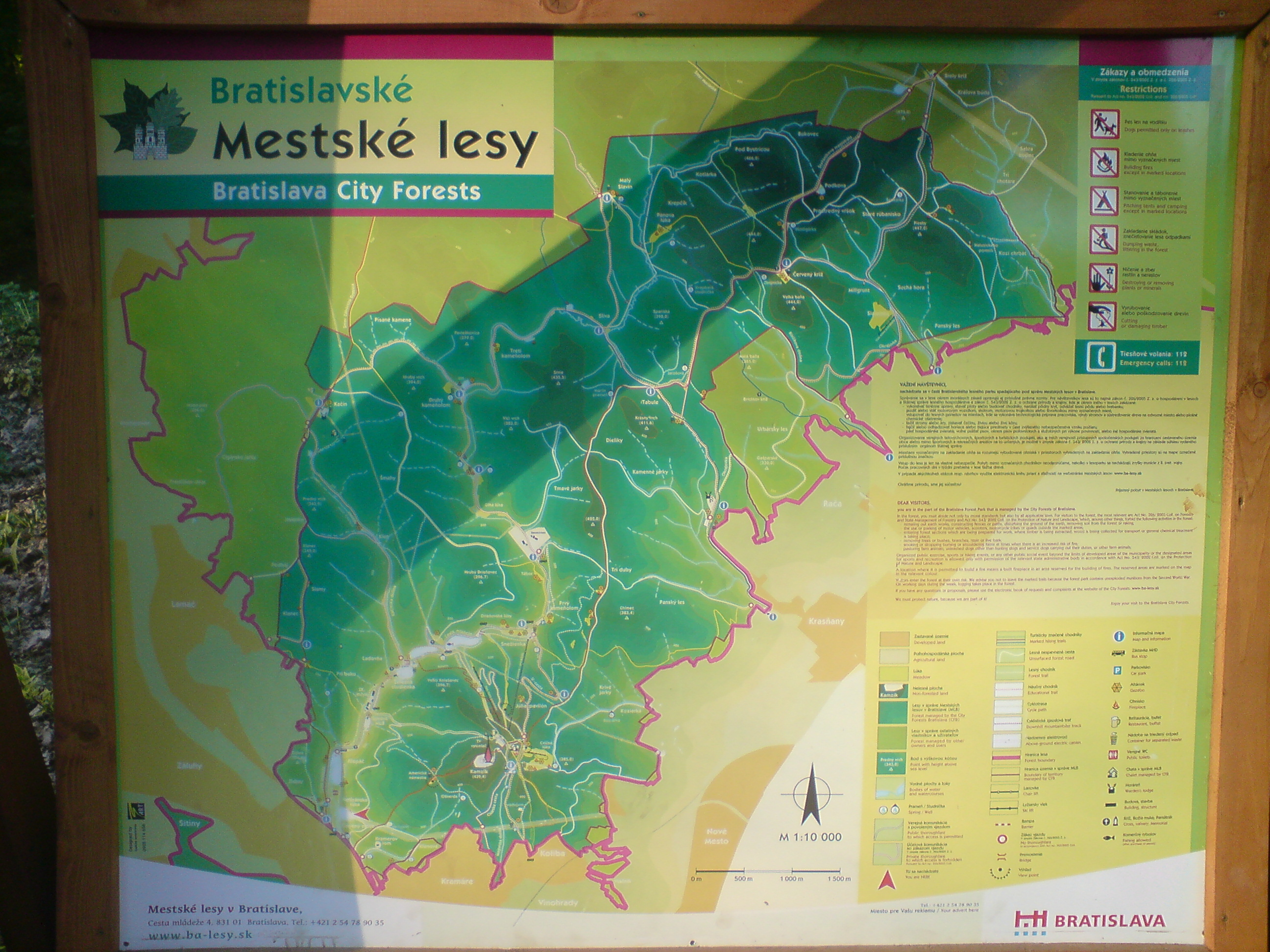
Map of the Bratislava Forest Park.

Bratislava Forest Park is accessible by public transport. Železná studienka itself can be reached in five minutes by bus No. 43, starting from Patrónka (a major transport junction in Bratislava). Automobile access to the park is limited.

The last research of the visitors to the Bratislava Forest Park was conducted during June and July 2012 as part of the Urbannatur project, which is part of the Cross-border Cooperation Program Slovakia - Austria 2007-2013, financed by the European Union and the state budget of the Slovak Republic. The research concluded that the most important entrance point into the park is Červený most with 62% total visitors, other entrance points in descending order of use are Koliba and Pekná cesta – Horáreň Krasňany. Cyclists represent 13% of all visitors, most of them - 37% access the park from Potočná Street in Rača.

While dogs are allowed entry into the park, visitors are prohibited from letting them off the leash. According to VZN 6/2003 §2, letter C, the Bratislava Forest Park is a public area (Slovak: verejné priestranstvo).

== See also ==
- Geography of Bratislava
