= Socialist architecture in Slovakia =

Socialist Architecture in Slovakia
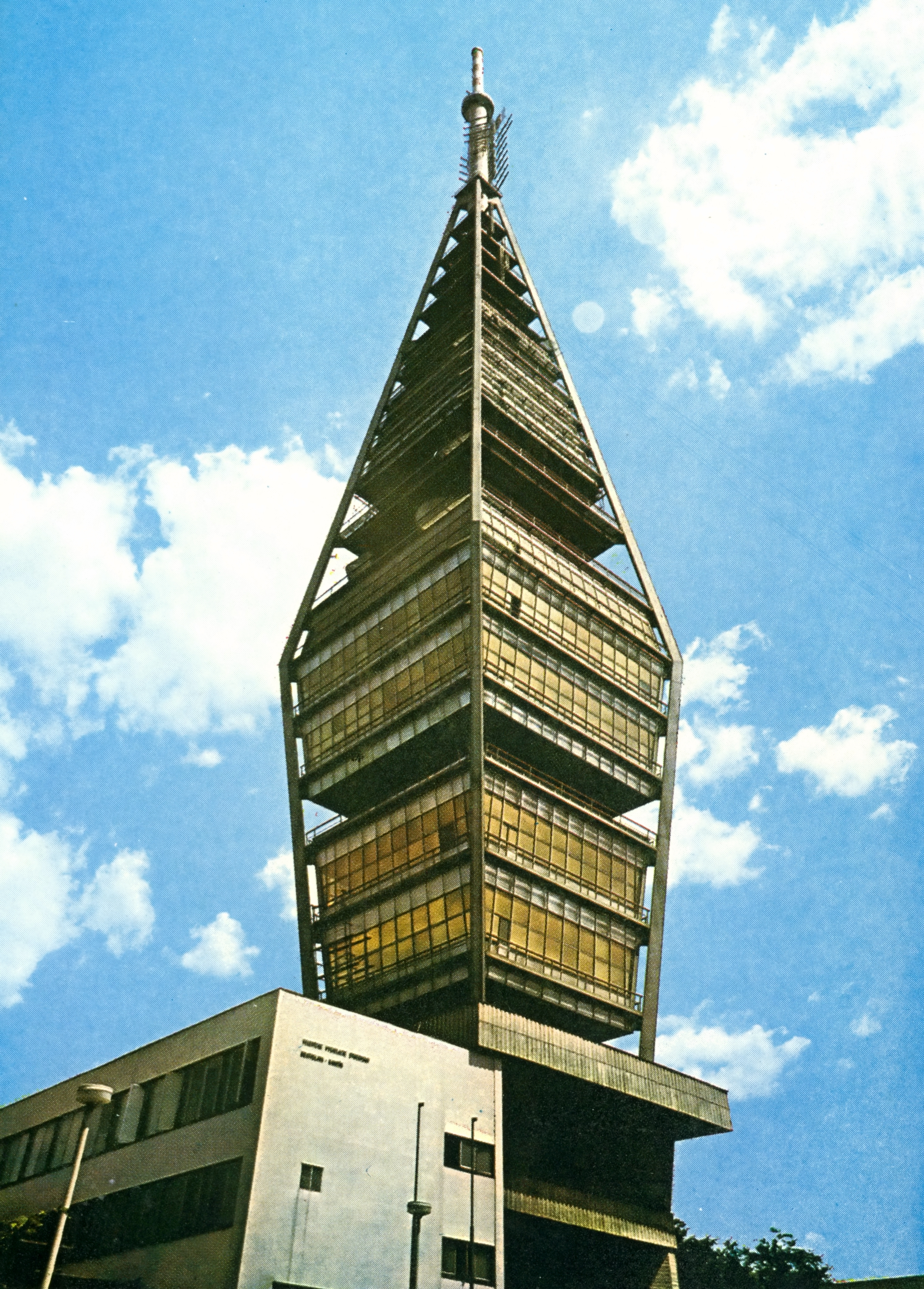
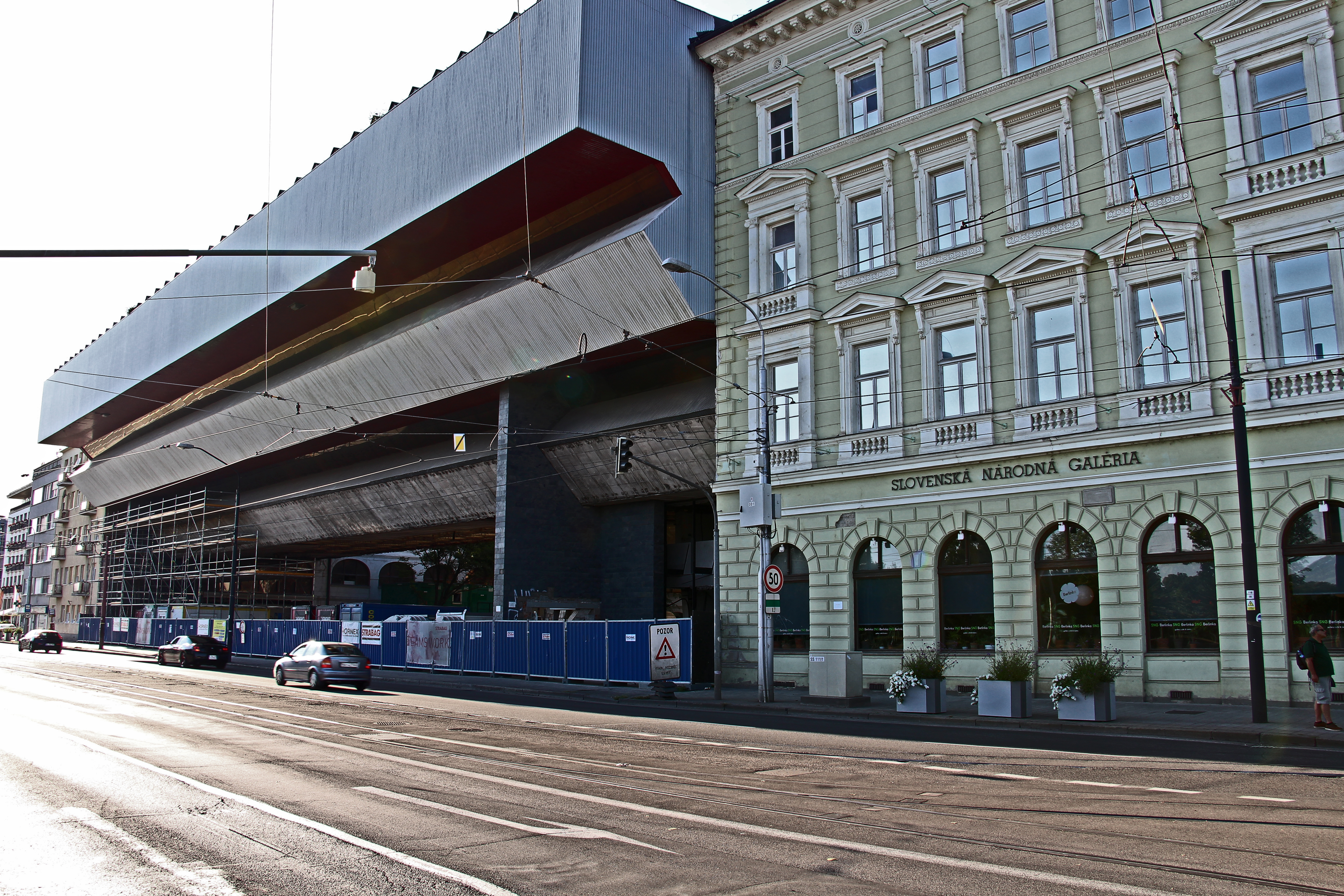
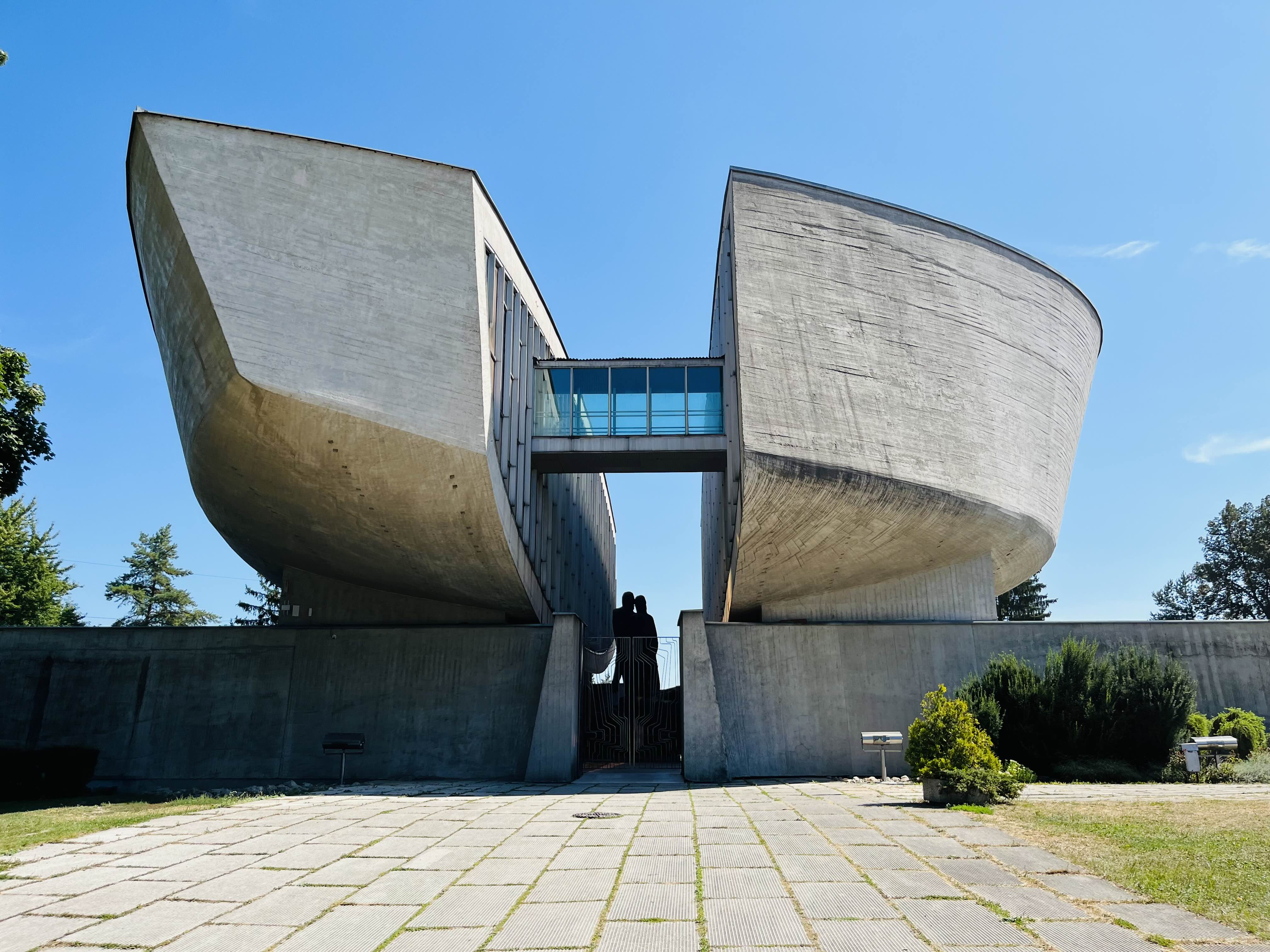
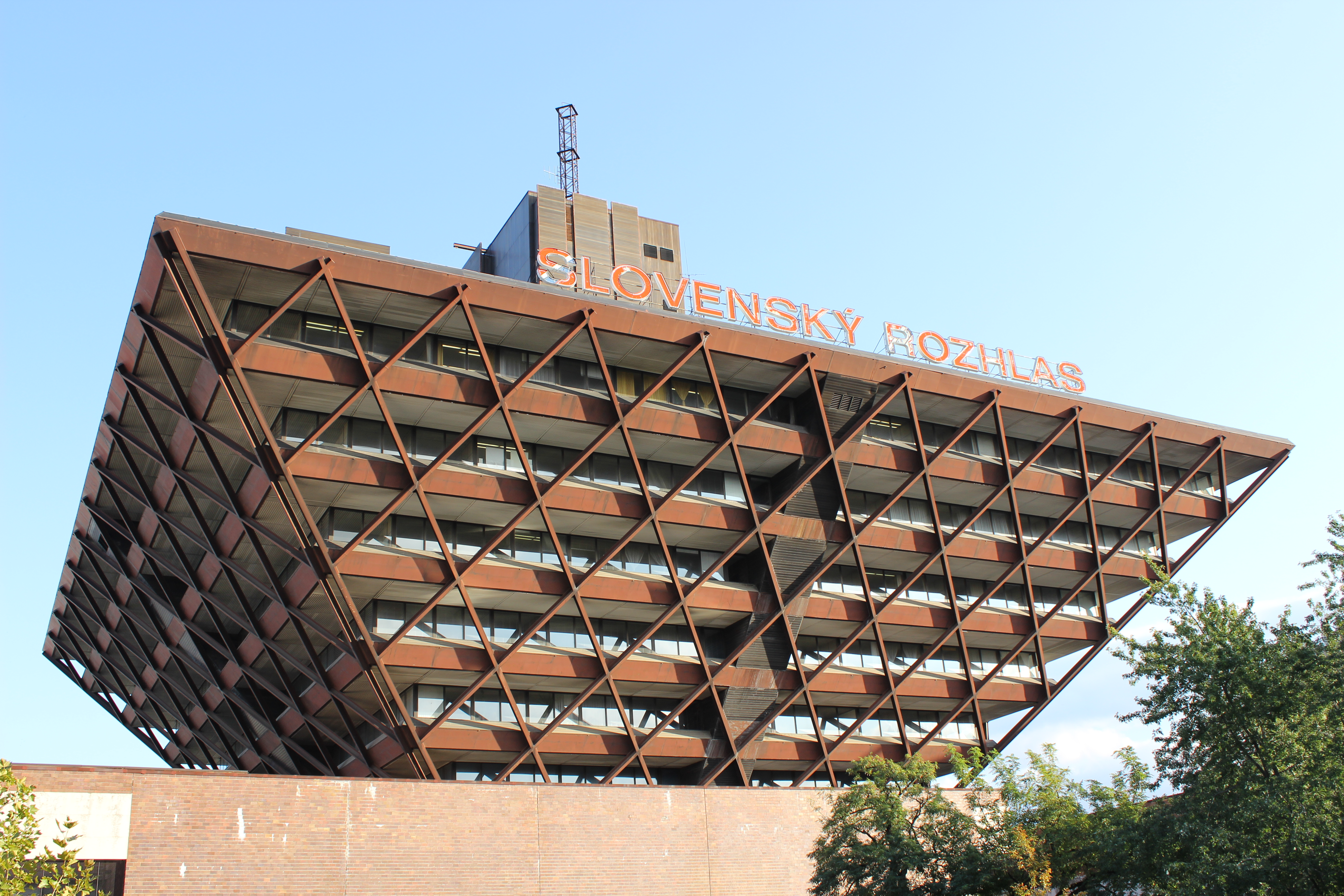
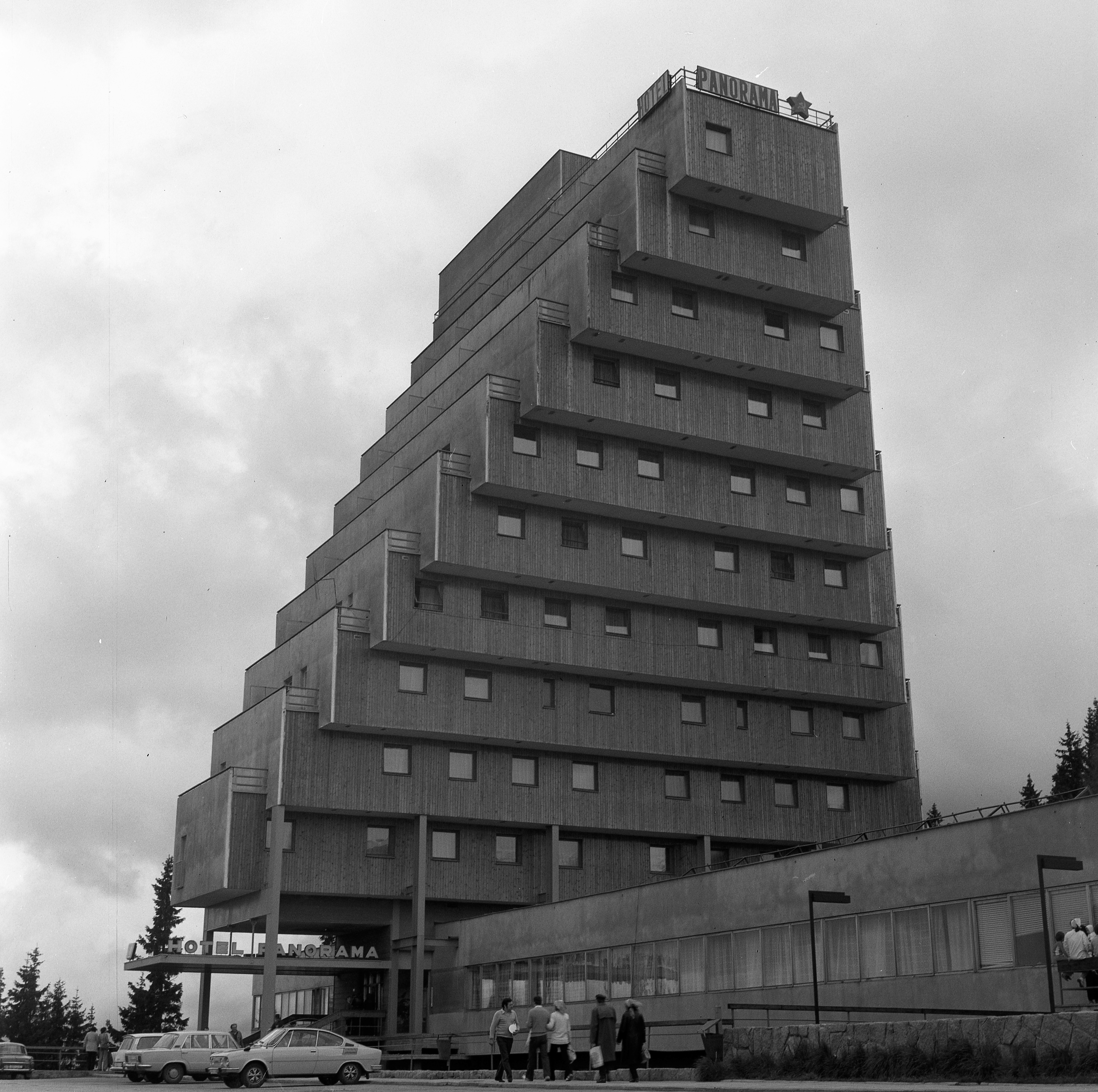
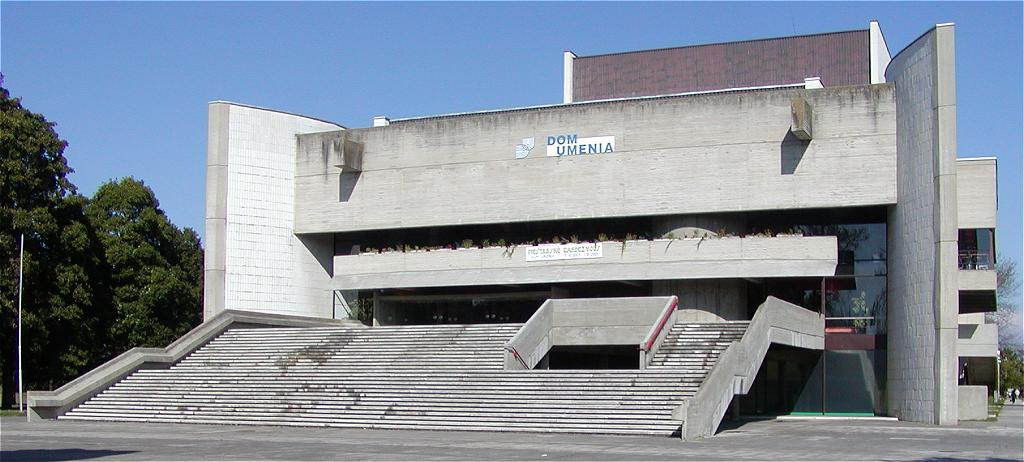
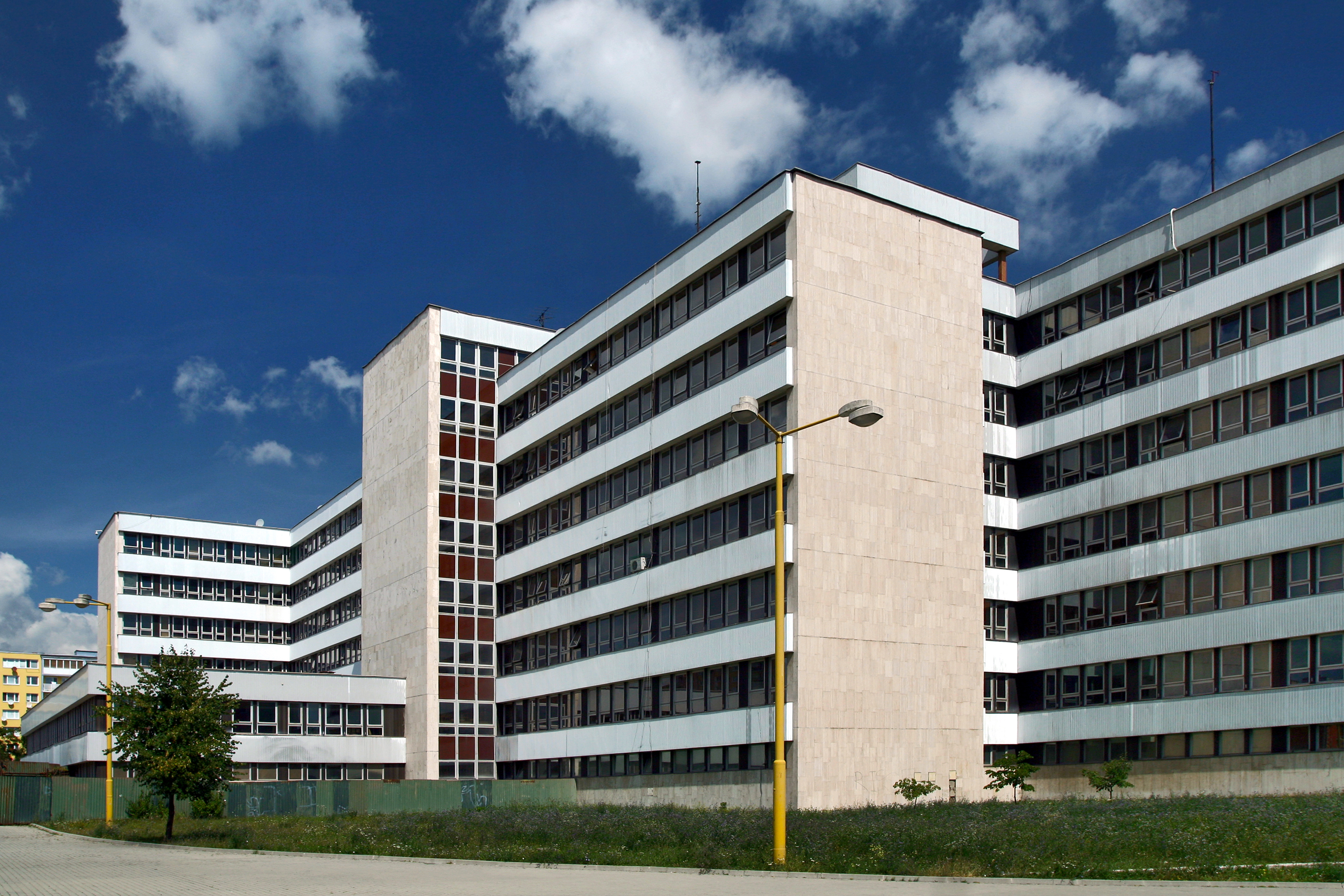
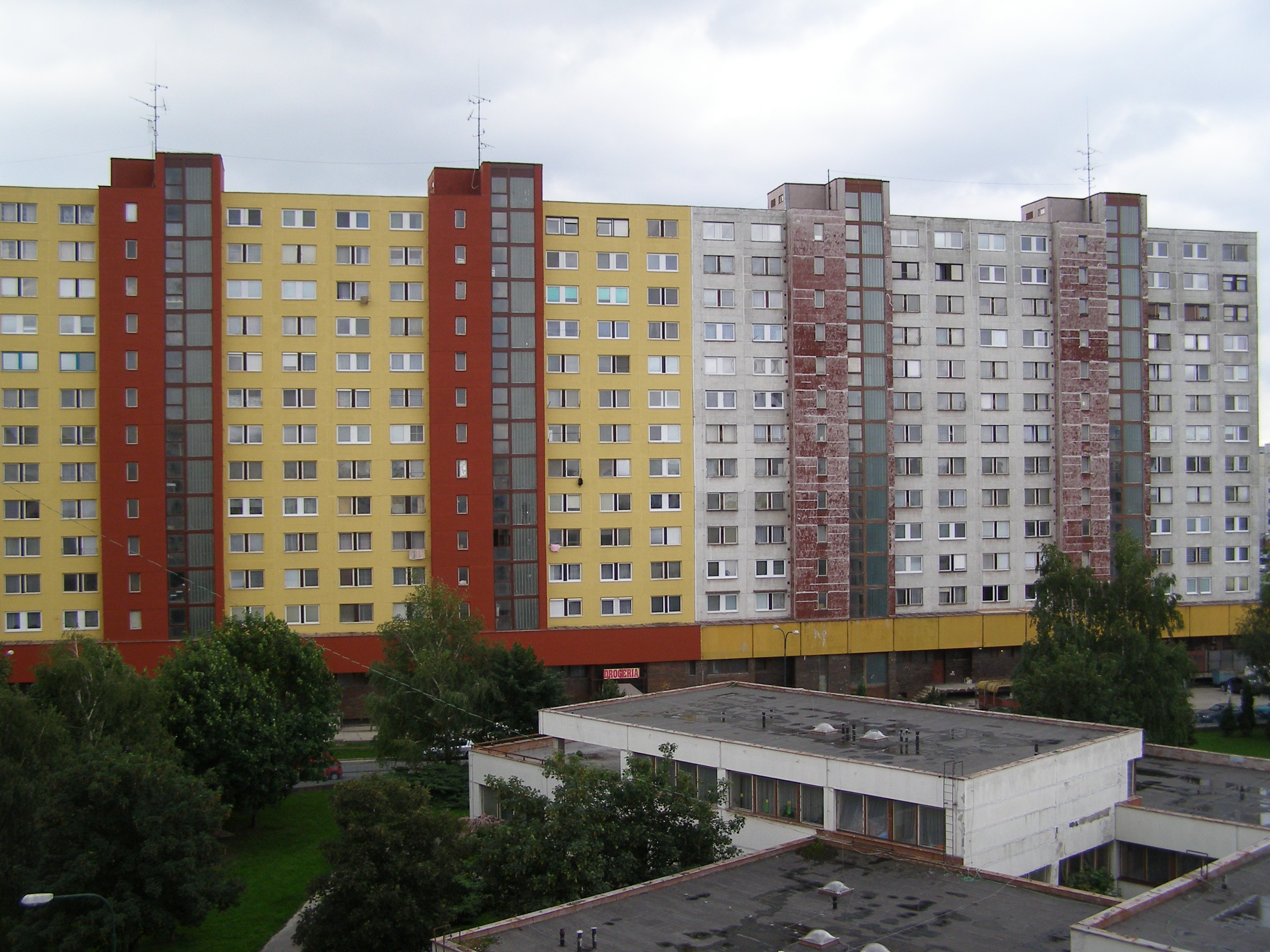
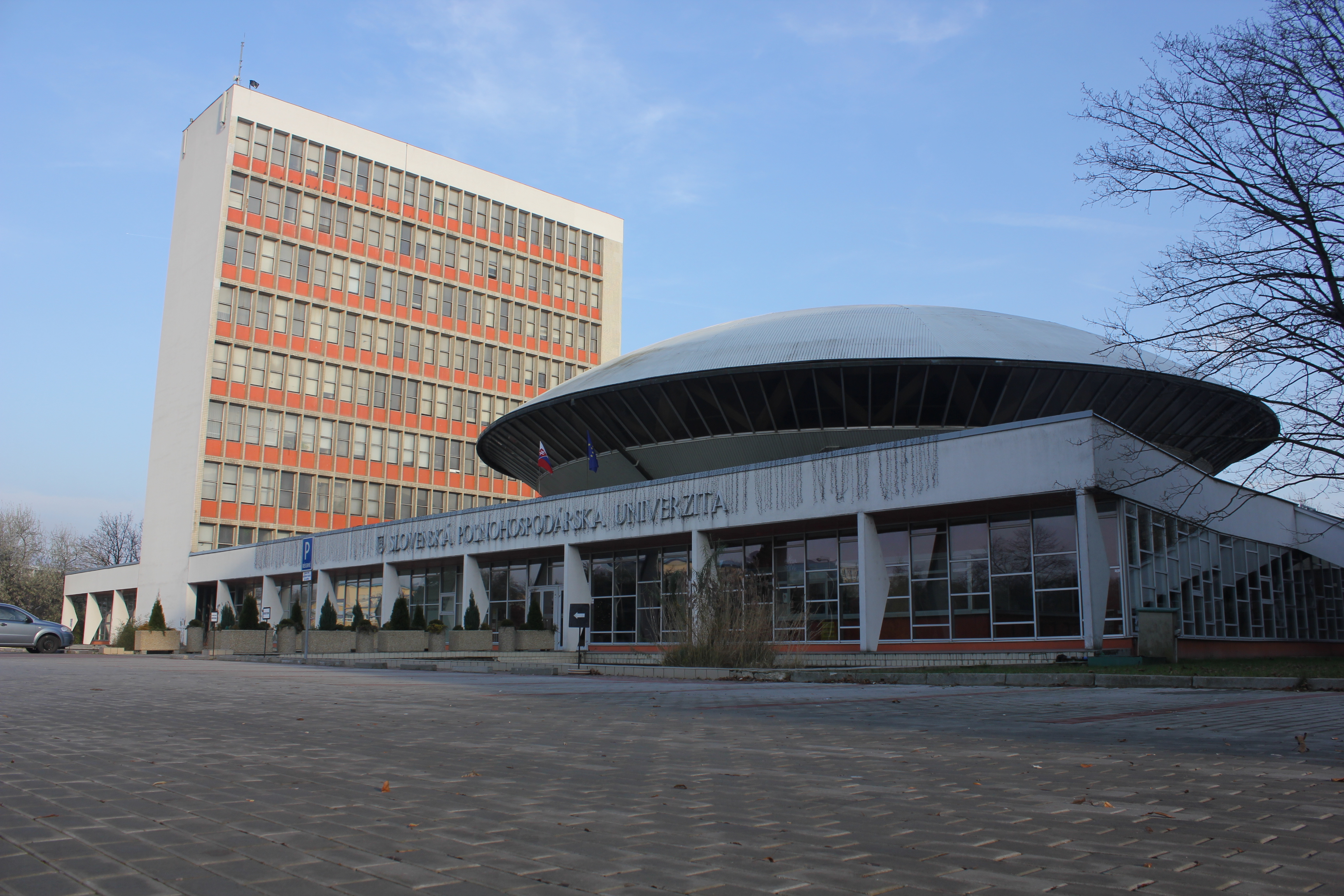
- Top row:Kamzík TV Tower in Bratislava, National Galery in Bratislava, Museum of the Slovak National Uprising in Banská Bystrica, Slovak broadcast tower in Bratislava, Hotel Panorama in High Tatras, House of Art in Piešťany, Košice City Hall, block of flats in Petržalka, Slovak University of Agriculture in city of Nitra

Socialist-modernism and Brutalism played a major role in post-war reconstruction of Czechoslovakia. They first appeared in mid-1960s to the late 1980s representing a modern socialist vision and a break from Socialist Realism. After the Second World War, Czechoslovakia became part of the Eastern Bloc. Everyday life transitioned to a centrally planned economy, heavy industries, and urbanization increased. The era celebrated the life of the working class. Art, literature, media, and socialist architecture were used by state as propaganda tools to emphasize and control socialist policies and ideas.

== Notable buildings ==
Bratislava:

- Kamzík TV Tower
- Most SNP
- Hotel Kyjev
- Supreme court

Košice:

- Technical University of Košice
- Louis Pasteur University Hospital
- Košice White House

Prešov:

- Faculty of Arts
- Old town monuments
- Wedding Hall
- Námestie mieru
