= Vydrica =

Vydrica may refer to:

- Vydrica (river), a 17 km long river in the Little Carpathians in Bratislava, Slovakia
- Vydrica (borough), a medieval city borough of Bratislava, Slovakia established in 1360s and demolished in the 1960s
- Vydrica (Mlynská dolina), a settlement in the southern Mlynská dolina in Bratislava, Slovakia that ceased to exist in the 1350s
