= Geography of Bratislava =

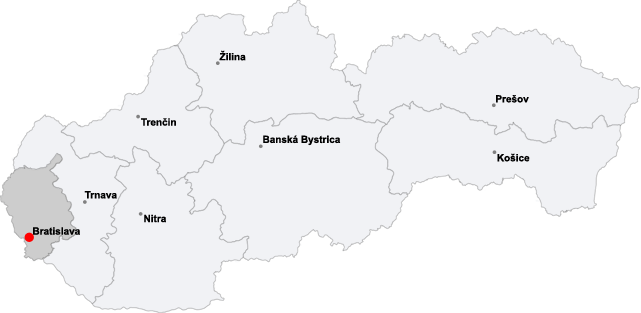
Location of Bratislava within the Bratislava Region and within Slovakia

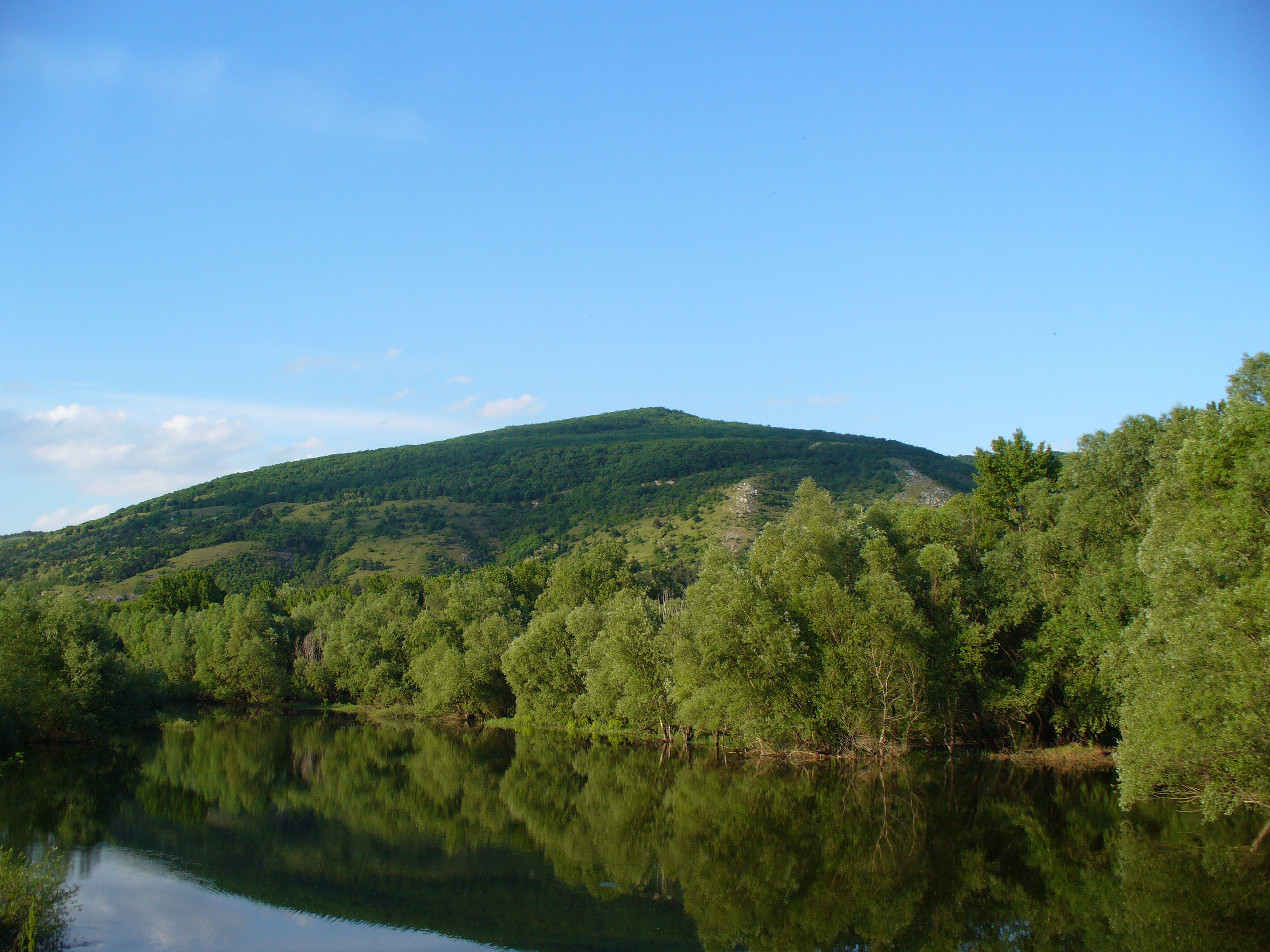
Bratislava's highest point, Devínska Kobyla, part of the Little Carpathians mountain range

Bratislava, the capital city of Slovakia, is situated in Central Europe and it is located in the extreme south-west within Slovakia. The city borders Austria in the west and Hungary in the south making it the only national capital in the world to border two foreign countries. The state border with the Czech Republic is only 62 km (39 mi) distant. Bratislava lies on the foothills of the Little Carpathians mountains and the city straddles both banks of the Danube River. The city has a total area of 367.58 km^{2} (141.92 sq mi), making it the second largest city in Slovakia by area (after the township of Vysoké Tatry). Geomorphologically the city covers the southern tip of the Záhorie Lowland, the entire range of the Devín Carpathians, small westernmost part of the Pezinok Carpahians and the northern tip of the Danubian Lowland.

The Danube crosses the city from the west to the south-east. The Middle Danube basin begins at Devín Gate in western Bratislava. Other rivers nearby are the Morava River, which forms the north-western border of the city and flows into the Danube at Devín, the Little Danube, and the Vydrica, which flows into the Danube at the borough of Karlova Ves. Some parts of Bratislava, particularly Devín and Devínska Nová Ves, are vulnerable to floods. New flood protection is being built on both banks.

The Carpathian mountain range begins in city territory with the Little Carpathians (Malé Karpaty). The area includes Bratislava Forest Park, which is popular with many Bratislavans and is part of the Little Carpathians Protected Landscape Area. The city's lowest point is at the Danube's surface, at 126 m (413 ft) above mean sea level, and the highest point is Devínska Kobyla at 514 m (1,686 ft). The average altitude is 140 m (460 ft). The Záhorie and Danubian Lowlands are partly situated in the city.

The nearest towns and villages are: to the north Stupava, Borinka and Svätý Jur; to the east Ivanka pri Dunaji and Most pri Bratislave; to the south-east Rovinka, Dunajská Lužná and Šamorín; to the south Rajka (HU); and to the west Kittsee (AT), Hainburg an der Donau (AT) and Marchegg (AT).

== Distances from selected European cities ==
Bratislava is situated: 62 km from Vienna; 196 km from Budapest; 324 km from Prague; 532 km from Warsaw; 569 km from Belgrade; 769 km from Zürich; 1005 km from Kyiv; 1266 km from Paris; 1273 km from Amsterdam; 1314 km from Rome; 1473 km from Istanbul; 1602 km from London; 1735 km from Stockholm; 1886 km from Athens; 2104 km from Moscow and 2261 km from Madrid.

== Climate ==
Bratislava lies in the north temperate zone and has a temperate climate, transitioning to humid continental climate with four distinct seasons. It is often windy with a marked variation between hot summers and cold, humid winters. Recently, the transitions from winter to summer and summer to winter have been rapid, with short autumn and spring periods and the weather is occasionally extreme, quickly changing its state. Snow occurs less frequently now than previously.

Climate data for Bratislava airport (normals and extremes 1991-2020)
Month	Jan	Feb	Mar	Apr	May	Jun	Jul	Aug	Sep	Oct	Nov	Dec	Year
Record high °C (°F)	19.7 (67.5)	20.3 (68.5)	23.5 (74.3)	30.5 (86.9)	33.4 (92.1)	36.3 (97.3)	38.2 (100.8)	39.4 (102.9)	33.0 (91.4)	27.6 (81.7)	21.5 (70.7)	16.7 (62.1)	39.4 (102.9)
Mean daily maximum °C (°F)	3.1 (37.6)	5.8 (42.4)	11.1 (52.0)	17.5 (63.5)	21.7 (71.1)	25.6 (78.1)	28.0 (82.4)	27.9 (82.2)	21.9 (71.4)	15.6 (60.1)	9.3 (48.7)	3.7 (38.7)	15.9 (60.7)
Daily mean °C (°F)	0.3 (32.5)	1.9 (35.4)	6.1 (43.0)	11.7 (53.1)	16.2 (61.2)	20.2 (68.4)	22.0 (71.6)	21.5 (70.7)	16.2 (61.2)	10.7 (51.3)	5.7 (42.3)	1.1 (34.0)	11.1 (52.1)
Mean daily minimum °C (°F)	−2.8 (27.0)	−1.7 (28.9)	1.7 (35.1)	5.7 (42.3)	10.6 (51.1)	14.2 (57.6)	16.2 (61.2)	15.9 (60.6)	11.2 (52.2)	6.3 (43.3)	2.6 (36.7)	−1.5 (29.3)	6.5 (43.8)
Record low °C (°F)	−18.2 (−0.8)	−19.8 (−3.6)	−13.9 (7.0)	−4.5 (23.9)	0.2 (32.4)	4.8 (40.6)	8.4 (47.1)	7.3 (45.1)	0.8 (33.4)	−7.4 (18.7)	−12.5 (9.5)	−20.3 (−4.5)	−20.3 (−4.5)
Average precipitation mm (inches)	37.4 (1.47)	32.9 (1.30)	36.8 (1.45)	35.9 (1.41)	58.6 (2.31)	59.2 (2.33)	61.8 (2.43)	60.5 (2.38)	58.6 (2.31)	43.6 (1.72)	46.2 (1.82)	42.7 (1.68)	574.2 (22.61)
Average precipitation days (≥ 1.0 mm)	7.5	6.5	7	5.6	8.1	7.7	7.9	7	6.5	6.4	7.7	8	85.9
Average snowy days	11.2	8.7	5.8	1.3	0	0	0	0	0	0.2	4.1	8.6	39.9
Average relative humidity (%)	80.9	74.7	67.5	61	62.8	62	60.5	62.3	69.2	76.8	81.9	83.2	70.2
Mean monthly sunshine hours	65.5	99.3	153.7	218.6	258.1	269.4	286.5	273.3	194.5	134.6	69.6	51.9	2,075
Source: NOAA NCEI

Climate data for Koliba, Bratislava (normals 1991-2020)
Month	Jan	Feb	Mar	Apr	May	Jun	Jul	Aug	Sep	Oct	Nov	Dec	Year
Mean daily maximum °C (°F)	2.5 (36.5)	5.5 (41.9)	10.6 (51.1)	17.0 (62.6)	21.2 (70.2)	25.0 (77.0)	27.2 (81.0)	27.2 (81.0)	21.2 (70.2)	14.8 (58.6)	8.1 (46.6)	2.9 (37.2)	15.3 (59.5)
Daily mean °C (°F)	−0.3 (31.5)	1.5 (34.7)	5.8 (42.4)	11.3 (52.3)	15.6 (60.1)	19.4 (66.9)	21.2 (70.2)	21.1 (70.0)	15.8 (60.4)	10.5 (50.9)	5.1 (41.2)	0.4 (32.7)	10.6 (51.1)
Mean daily minimum °C (°F)	−2.7 (27.1)	−1.5 (29.3)	2.0 (35.6)	6.7 (44.1)	10.9 (51.6)	14.4 (57.9)	16.3 (61.3)	16.3 (61.3)	11.9 (53.4)	7.2 (45.0)	2.8 (37.0)	−1.7 (28.9)	6.9 (44.4)
Average precipitation mm (inches)	45.7 (1.80)	42.8 (1.69)	48.3 (1.90)	43.4 (1.71)	68.2 (2.69)	72.1 (2.84)	70.8 (2.79)	70.0 (2.76)	74.0 (2.91)	55.4 (2.18)	57.0 (2.24)	53.4 (2.10)	701.1 (27.61)
Average precipitation days (≥ 1.0 mm)	8.4	7.4	8.1	6.5	8.9	8.1	8.9	7	7.5	7.7	8.7	9.2	96.4
Average snowy days	12.8	10	7.3	1.7	0	0	0	0	0	0.6	5.4	10.1	47.9
Average relative humidity (%)	82.5	76.1	67.8	60.8	64.8	64.5	62.7	63.7	71.1	79.1	84.8	87.7	72.1
Mean monthly sunshine hours	64.2	98	156.5	220.4	264.8	272.3	292.4	278.9	195.2	136.2	66	48.7	2,093.6
Source: NOAA NCEI

- Annual sunshine: 1976.4 hours (5.4 hours/day)
- Average annual temperature: 10 °C (50 °F)

== Rivers and lakes in Bratislava ==
Twenty water streams originate in the area of Bratislava. Four rivers flow through the area of the city: Danube, Morava river, Little Danube and partially Malina.

In addition, 18 streams (Slovak: potok) and 9 canals (Slovak: kanál) or canalized streams flow through the city. The following is their list in alphabetical order:

- Antošov canal
- Banský stream
- Bystrický stream
- Bystrička
- Čierny stream
- Dúbravský stream
- Horná Sihoť
- Chorvátske rameno
- Jarovské rameno
- Karloveské rameno
- Mošonské rameno
- Rusovské rameno
- Dymolez
- Chotárny stream
- Kratina
- Lamačský stream
- Marianský stream
- Mástsky stream
- Mokrý potok (also called Mokrý jarok)
- Na Pántoch
- Pieskový stream
- Račiansky stream (also called Račiansky canal)
- Rakyta
- Rusovský canal
- Stará Mláka
- Struha
- Šúrsky canal
- Uhliarka
- Vajnorský canal
- Vajnorský stream
- Vápenický stream
- Veľkolúcky stream
- Vydrica

== Panorama of the city ==
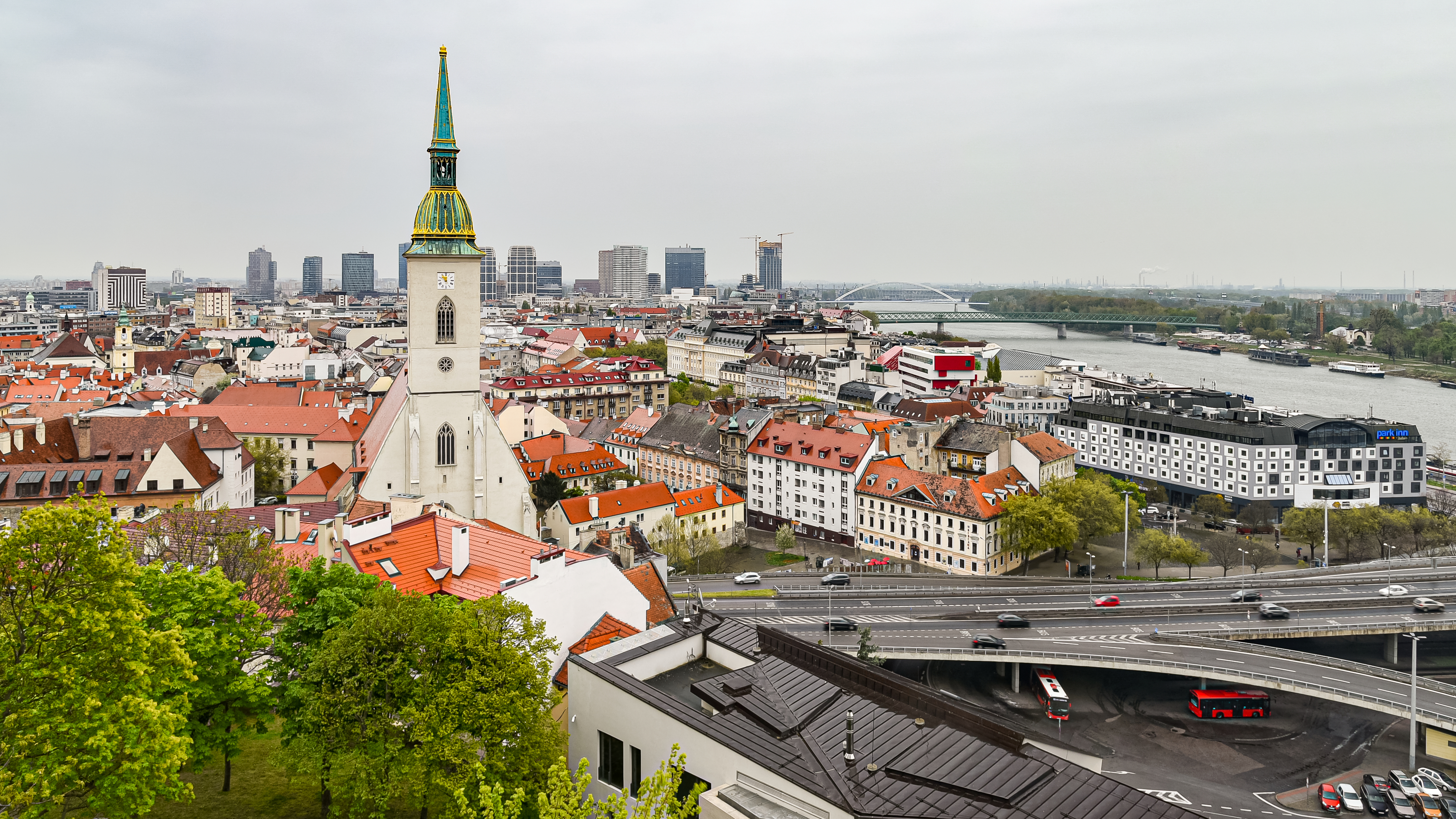
Panorama of the Old Town from Bratislava Castle

== See also ==
- Boroughs and localities of Bratislava
- List of tallest buildings in Bratislava
- Parks and gardens in Bratislava
