= Bratislava Železná studienka railway station =

Railway stop in Bratislava, Slovakia

Bratislava Železná studienka
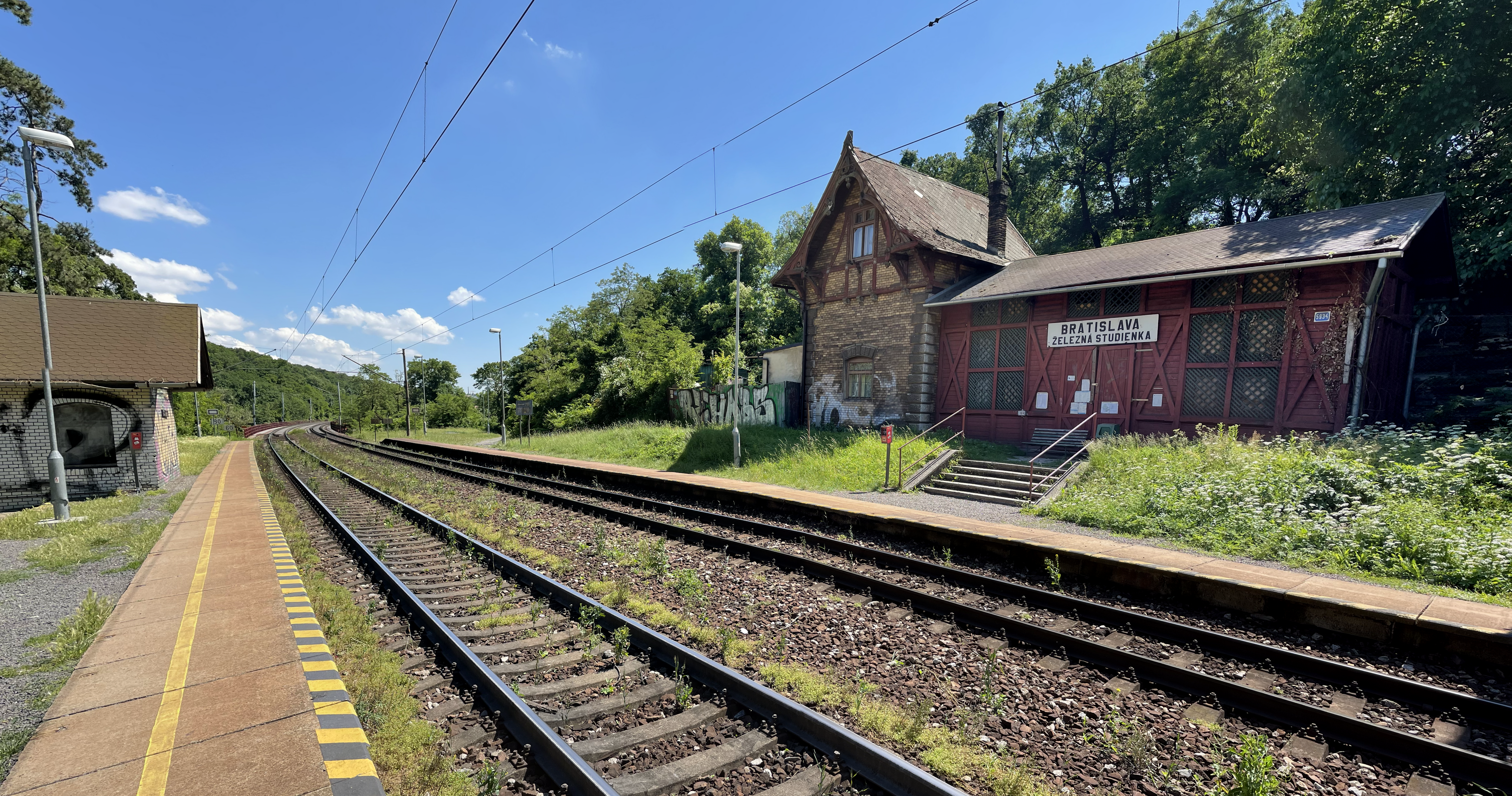
- Bratislava Železná studienka main railway station building

General information
- Location: Bratislava Forest Park; Nové Mesto; Bratislava II; Bratislava Region; Slovakia
- Coordinates: 48°10′28″N 17°04′22″E
- System: railway station
- Owner: Železnice Slovenskej republiky (ŽSR)
- Operator: Železnice Slovenskej republiky (ŽSR)
- Line: S20 Bratislava – Kúty
- Platforms: 2
- Connections: Public transport: Buses: 43; Trolleybuses: 207, 211, 212

History
- Opened: 1904
Location
- Location within Slovakia

Bratislava Železná studienka railway station (Hungarian: Pozsony-Vaskutacska vasútállomás, Slovak: Železničná zastávka Bratislava-Železná studienka; Železničná zastávka Bratislava-Železná studnička; Železničná stanica Bratislava-Železná studienka; Železničná stanica Bratislava-Železná studnička, Czech: Železniční zastávka Bratislava-Železní studénka; Železniční zastávka Bratislava-Železní studnička; Železniční stanice Bratislava-Železní studénka; Železniční stanice Bratislava-Železní studnička) is a small railway station (technically a train halt) inside the Bratislava Forest Park recreational zone in northern Bratislava, Slovakia.

The station is still in use, although few trains stop here nowadays. It has two platforms, the one by rail number one being 149 metres (489 ft) long and 3 metres (10 ft) wide and the one by rail number two being 160 metres (525 ft) long and 3.6 metres (12 ft) wide.

== Etymology ==
Until 1947, the train station was called Červený most (Red bridge in English). From 1947 to 1951 it was called Bratislava - Červený most. In 1951 it received its current name Bratislava - Železná studienka. It is named after the area it is situated in - Železná studienka (Little iron well in English). The name comes from the fact, that in the past people thought the water source here was rich in iron and minerals, but 19th century analysis showed the water here is not mineral.

== History ==
Unique historical photograph, date unknown

The original Red bridge was built in 1848 next to the place where the train station will once be, carrying only one rail track on the Wien – Gänserndorf – Bratislava line, which was launched on August 20, 1848. The bridge crossed the valley over river Vydrica. In 1891, the line between Bratislava main railway station and Devínska Nová Ves was converted to 2 parallel rail tracks and the Red bridge was rebuilt.

The current train station was established in 1904 under the name Bratislava - Red Bridge (in German Rote Brücke, in Hungarian Vörös híd), being named after the nearby bridge. The waiting room and station-guard's house, both from 1904, are culturally protected.

== 2010 fire ==
On September 20, 2010, a fire completely destroyed one of the station's historical waiting rooms. The fire was probably started by accident by the homeless people sleeping inside. That day's morning had been quite chilly and homeless people have been known to sleep there for years.

== Rail lines ==
The following is a list of rail lines crossing this station:

- ŽSR rail line 100 (Bratislava – Marchegg)
- ŽSR rail line 110 / S20 (Bratislava – Kúty)
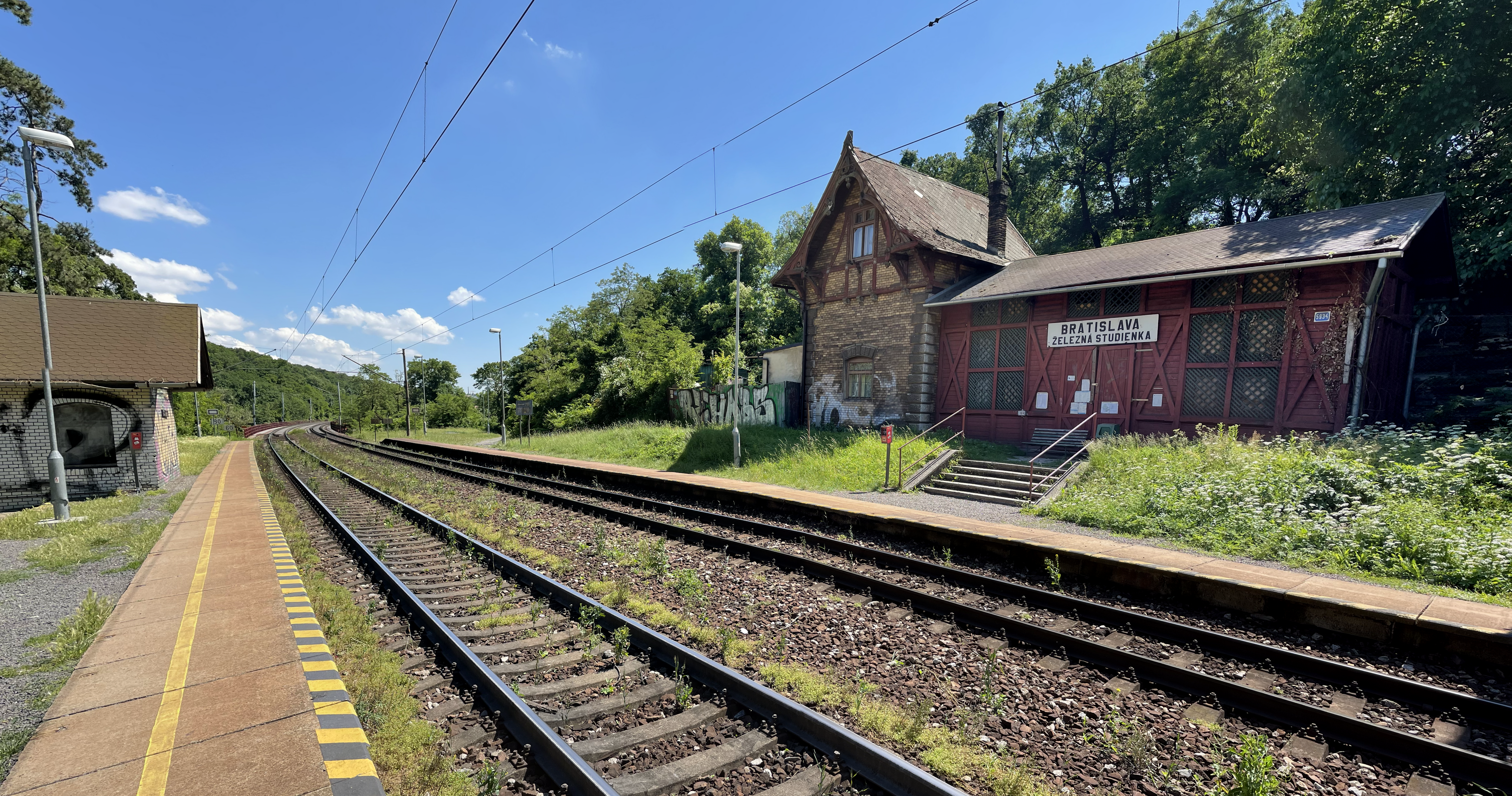

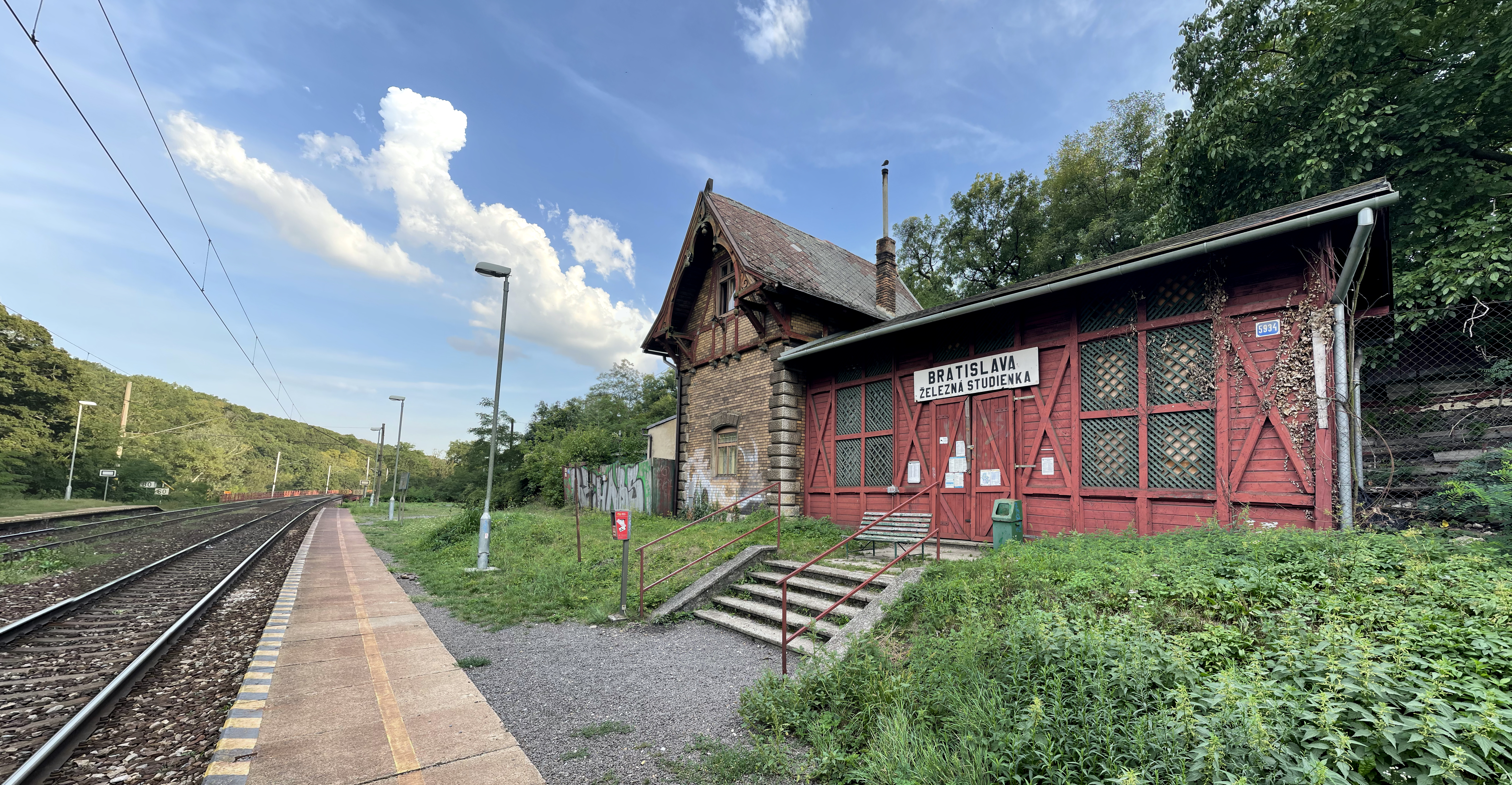

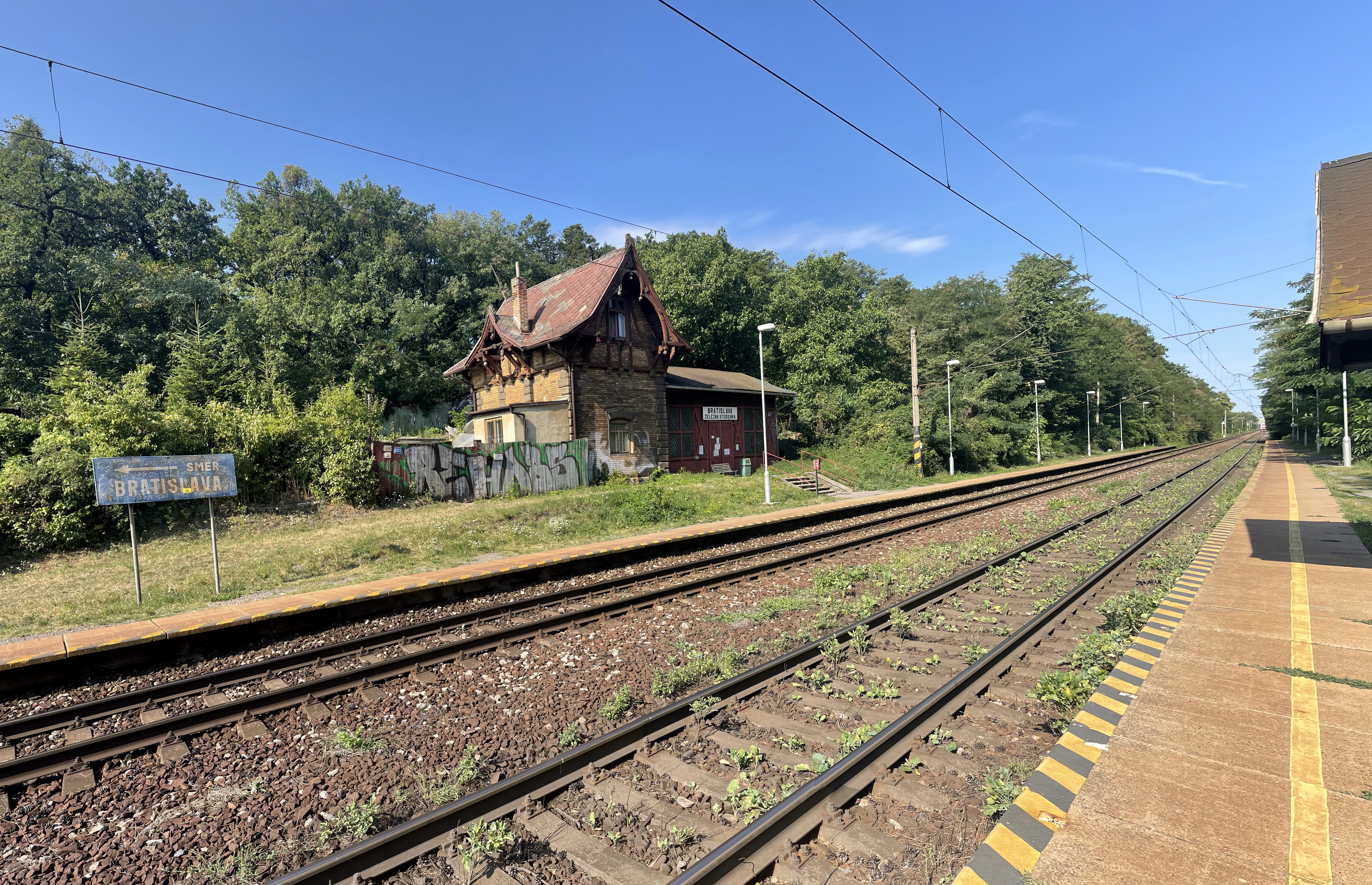

Preceding station		Following station
Bratislava hlavná stanica	ŽSR No. 110 Bratislava - Kúty - Břeclav	Bratislava Lamač railway station
