= Koliba =

Neighborhood of Bratislava, Slovakia

Coordinates: 48°10′21″N 17°06′10″E

- Neighborhood of Bratislava
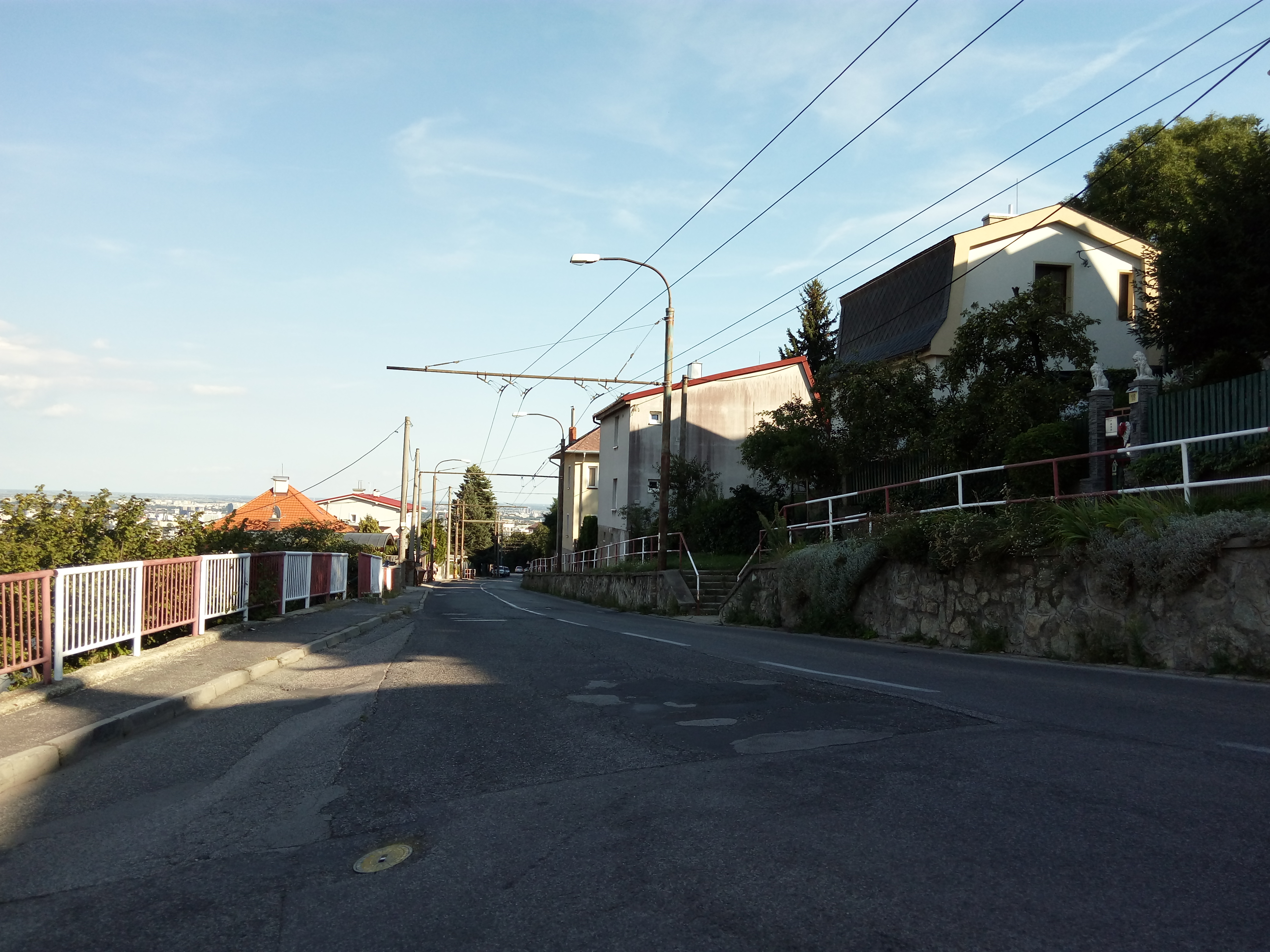
- Main street in Koliba
- Interactive map of Koliba
- Country: Slovakia
- Region: Bratislava Region
- City: Bratislava
- Borough: Nové Mesto
- Postal code (PSČ): 831 01
- Telephone area code: (+421) 2

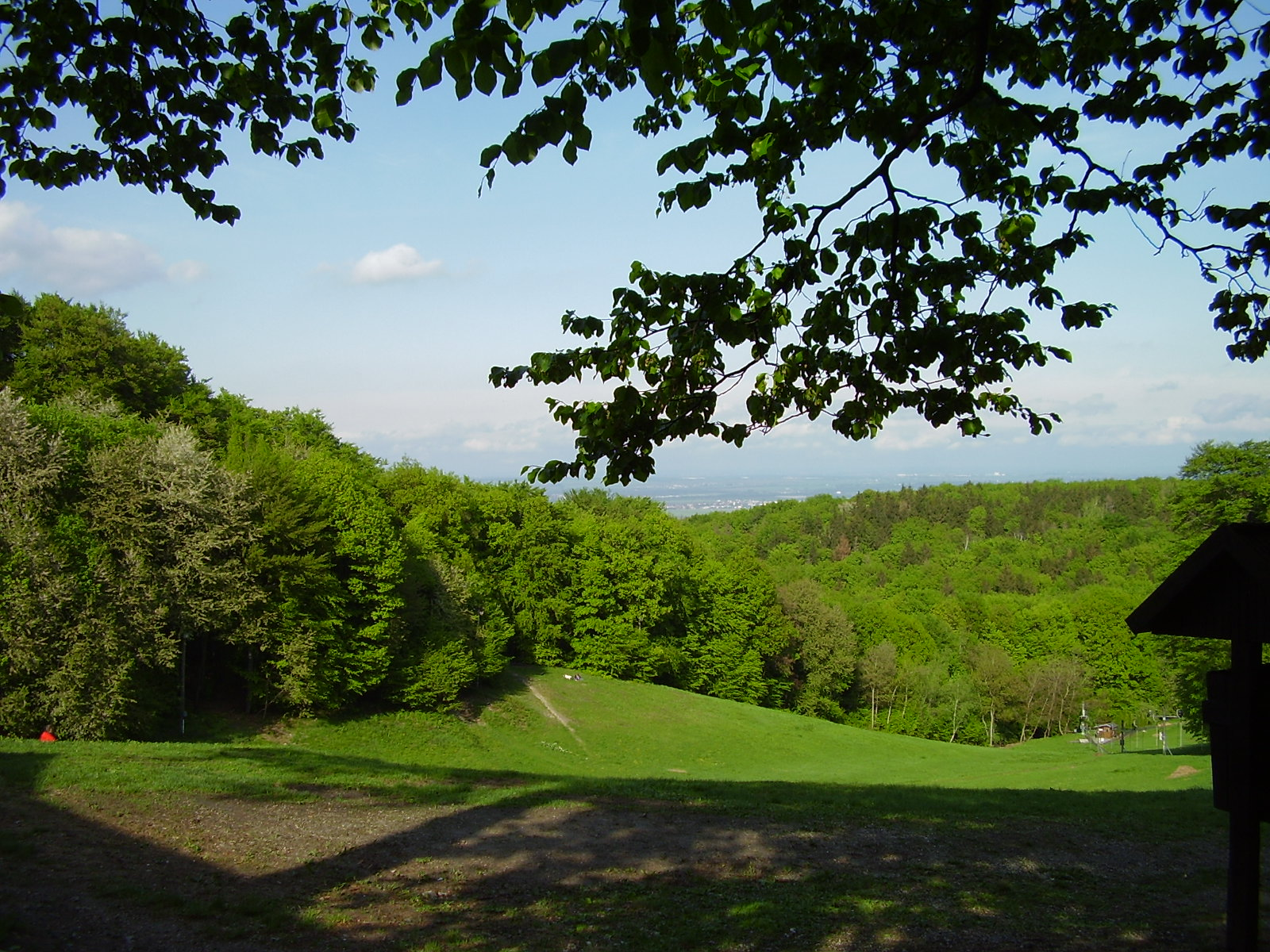
Cvičná lúka (Exercise meadow) at Koliba

Koliba is the name of a locality in Bratislava, Slovakia, which is situated on the foothills of the Little Carpathians. It administratively belongs to the Nové Mesto borough and is part of the Bratislava Forest Park.

The Kamzík TV Tower and the Kamzík Hill (Slovak: vrch Kamzík) (439 m) are located at the edge of the locality. It is also home to the Koliba Film Studios (Slovak: Filmové ateliéry Koliba).
