= Patrónka =

Area of Bratislava, Slovakia

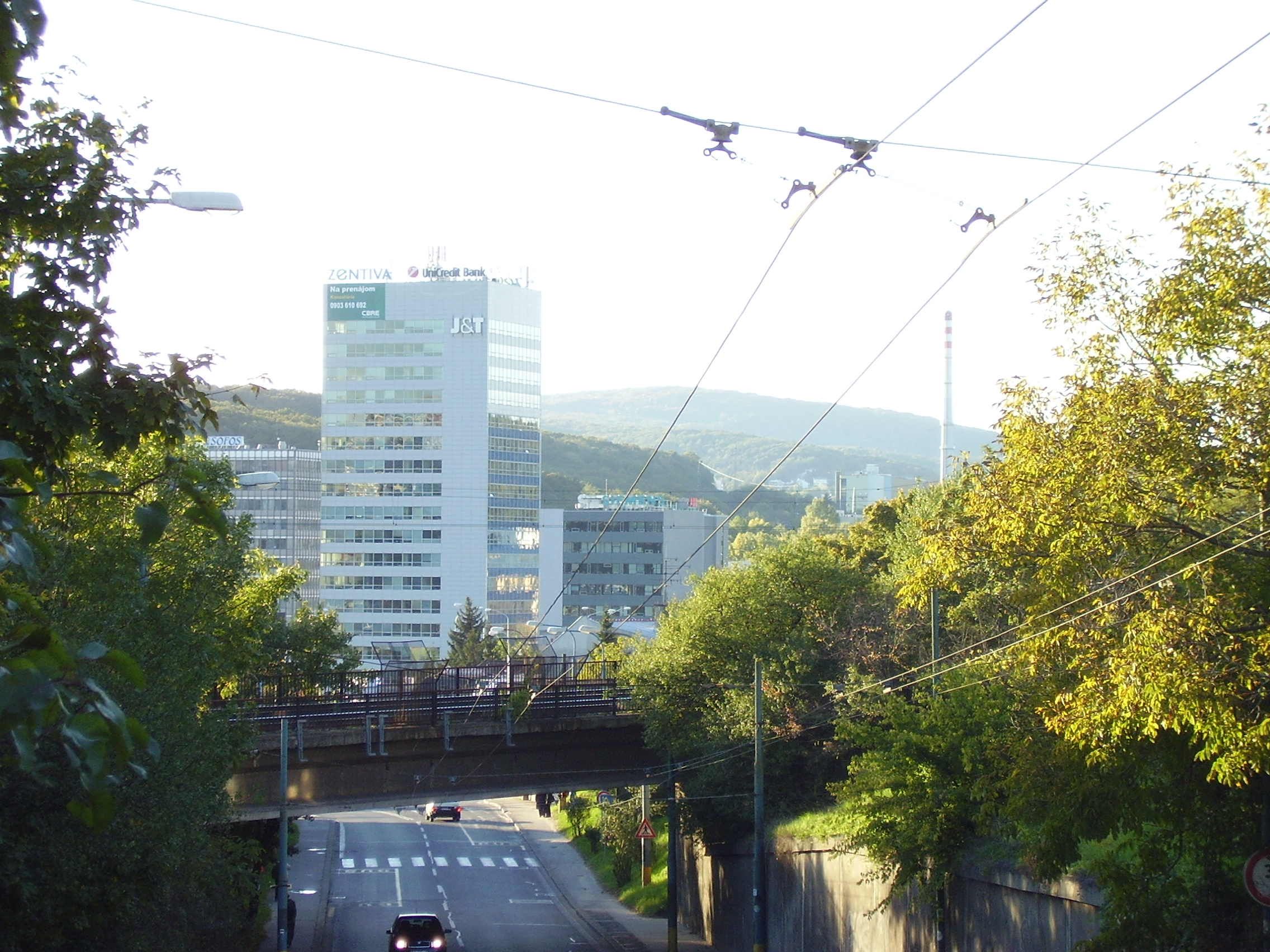
Distant look at the Westend Tower from the Kramáre city part of Bratislava

Patrónka is an area in the western part of Bratislava, the capital of Slovakia, it is also the name of a major transport junction within the area and an important bus stop. Patrónka is located at the boundary of Bratislava I Old Town and Bratislava IV Karlova Ves, located in the northwest of the city. The public transport bus and trolleybus stop serves as a main transport hub for residents of Dúbravka, Lamač, Devínska Nová Ves and Záhorská Bystrica boroughs of Bratislava and it is among the busiest in the city. It also serves as a minor inter-city bus stop covering the region of Záhorie. The traffic on the Patrónka junction also affects Lamač, Kramáre, Karlova Ves, Dúbravka and Devínska Nová Ves.

The area of Patrónka lies at the foothills of the Devín Carpathians and Pezinok Carpathians; it serves as the main passageway into the nearby Bratislava Forest Park, a popular recreation area. Patrónka is the location of the Slovak Academy of Sciences, the Military hospital in Bratislava and the Bratislava Železná studienka railway station.

== History ==
The locality of Patrónka was located between today's Dúbravská cesta, Brnianska Street, Hroboňova Street, Gaštanová Street until Horský park, Pri Suchom mlyne, bordered by the Bratislava-Kúty railway line until the Red Bridge, Military Hospital in Bratislava, Kühmayer factory and the current area of Slovak Academy of Sciences. It is named after a factory producing bullets ("patróny"; an old-fashioned Slovak language word for both bullets and shells) which stood here from 1872 to 1939. Until 1945 the official name for this locality was Westend (sometimes simply West) and after 1945 Západ.

In the 13th century, there was a settlement in this area which was destroyed during the Tatar invasions and a later settlement belonging to the Mayor of Bratislava Jakub. In 1870 the bullet factory of J. Roth was constructed here at the place of a water mill. It was one of the largest armament factories of the Austro-Hungarian monarchy, employing approximately 3,000 workers. The factory featured a freight cable car connecting it with Bratislava hlavná stanica railway station. In 1912, trolleybus service connected the area with Bratislava city center.

Patronka was the location of the holding area for Jews being deported from western Slovakia during 1942 - which was carried out by Slovak Fascists who handed them over to the Nazis - and 1945 for the Carpathian Germans from the Bratislava region.

In 1969, the first high-rises in Slovakia built using the curtain wall technology were finished at Patrónka, close to the road junction; the Lignoprojekt building and the building of the United Nations Computing Center (Slovak: Výpočtové stredisko OSN). The buildings were designed by architects V. Ferančík, F. Ohrablo and R. Fresser in 1960-1962 and their construction lingered for many years. The United Nation building today serves as the seat of the Institute of Informatics and Statistics INFOSTAT.

In July 2000, the reconstruction of the Lignoprojekt building by J&T commenced. The building was stripped down to its reinforced concrete shell, heightened, a new facade was constructed and it was renamed to Westend (later changed to its current name Westend Tower). By reconstructing other two buildings originally belonging to Lignoprojekt and Wood Research Institute (Slovak: Výskumný ústav drevársky), J&T created Westend Court and Westend Point.

In 2006, J&T sold Westend Tower to the AXA Group's real estate branch as part of a larger deal coupled with some logistic parks. The building is administered as part of an investment fund, whose majority investor is the Abu Dhabi Investment Authority (ADIA).

== Today ==
Next to the crossroads, there is the building of the Geological Survey of Slovak Republic (State Geological Institute of Dionýz Štúr). Nearby there are the building complexes of Slovak Academy of Sciences, the area of the former Military hospital in Bratislava and the access road to Bratislava Forest Park and Bratislava Železná studienka railway station.

Patrónka features an administrative complex called Westend, owned by the J&T Group and parts are currently under development by J&T Real Estate. The complex includes the Westend Tower and Westend Square high-rises, Westend Court and Westend Gate (known originally as Westend Quadrant). Westend Point has been torn down and is being replaced by Westend Plazza (known originally as Westend Crossing) to be finished in April 2018. Westend features 107 000 m2 of office space and 7 000 m2 retail space and comprises an investment of 216 million €.

== Patrónka bus and trolleybus stop ==
Patrónka is also the name of a major public transport stop and a minor inter-city bus stop, located next to the crossroads. The busy public transport bus and trolleybus stop serves as a main transport hub for residents of Dúbravka, Lamač, Devínska Nová Ves and Záhorská Bystrica boroughs of Bratislava and inter-city buses depart from here towards Záhorie and beyond. The terminal in the direction from the city center lies in the borough of Old Town, District Bratislava I while the opposite terminal, direction towards the city center, lies in Karlova Ves, District Bratislava IV. The terminals and the pedestrian underpass are administered by the Department of Road Management of the Bratislava City Magistrate (Slovak: Oddelenie cestného hospodárstva magistrátu).

The two massive grey terminals (one in each direction, connected by a pedestrian underpass) are striking examples of socialist realism in Bratislava and when built decades ago, they were among the most luxurious in the city, featuring newsstands and buffets.

In an unknown year, the workers of the Department of Road Management of the Bratislava City Magistrate removed several benches and plant pots and installed metal fencing at certain points, reducing the capacity of the public transport terminal, despite being in use daily by thousands of people. For an unknown reason, some benches were left intact and now can be seen from the crowded bus stop, inaccessible to the public. This action was explained by the Bratislava City Magistrate as an effort to prevent homeless people from sleeping there, in spite of the fact that there was never any publicized issue with the homeless at the bus stop.

In 2008 a semi-automatic ramp for the handicapped was installed at both exits from the pedestrian underpass, making it the first handicapped-accessible underpass in Bratislava.

== See also ==
- Transport in Bratislava
- Public transport in Bratislava
- Old Town, Bratislava

== Gallery ==
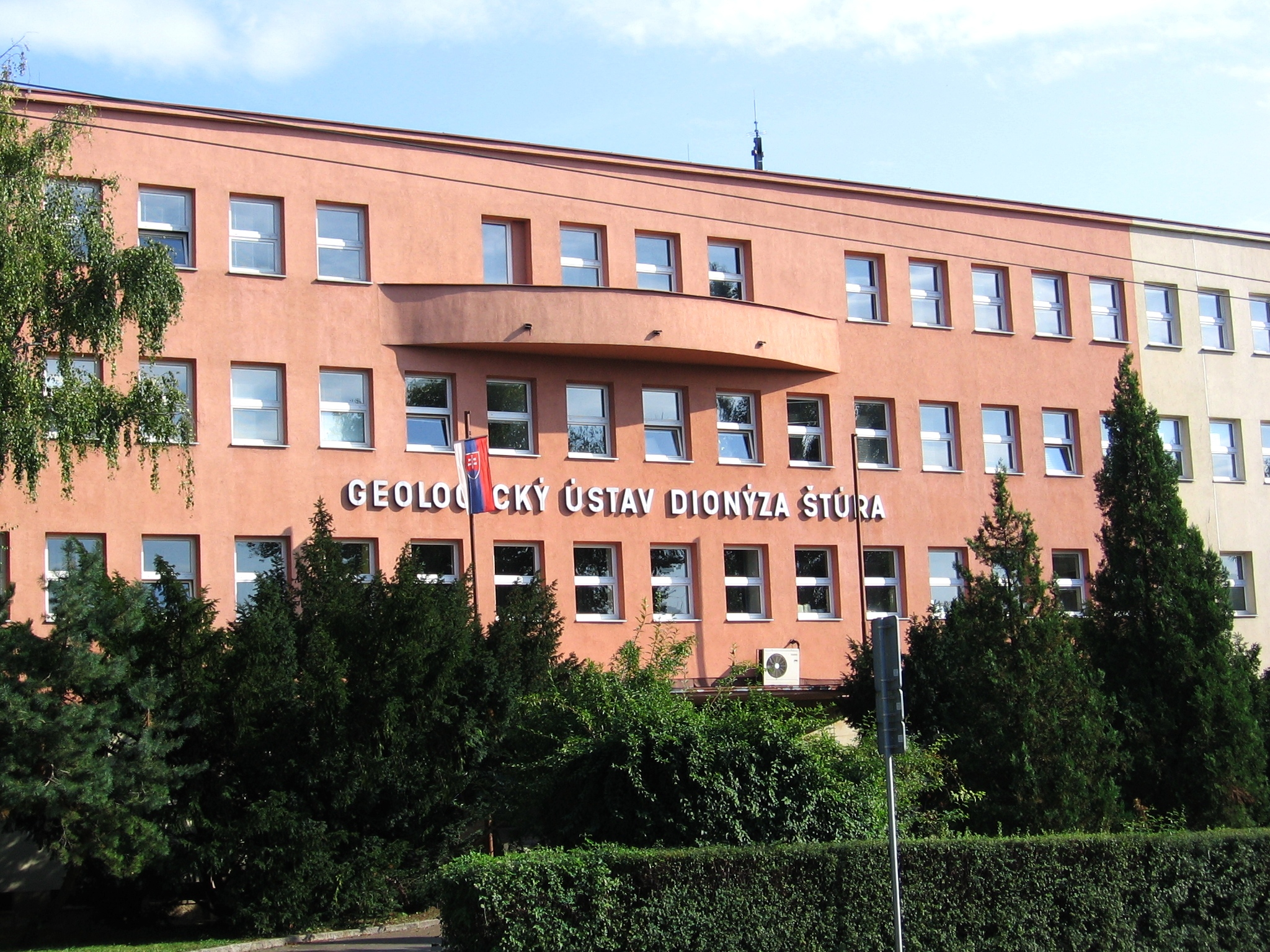
State Geological Institute of Dionýz Štúr at Patrónka

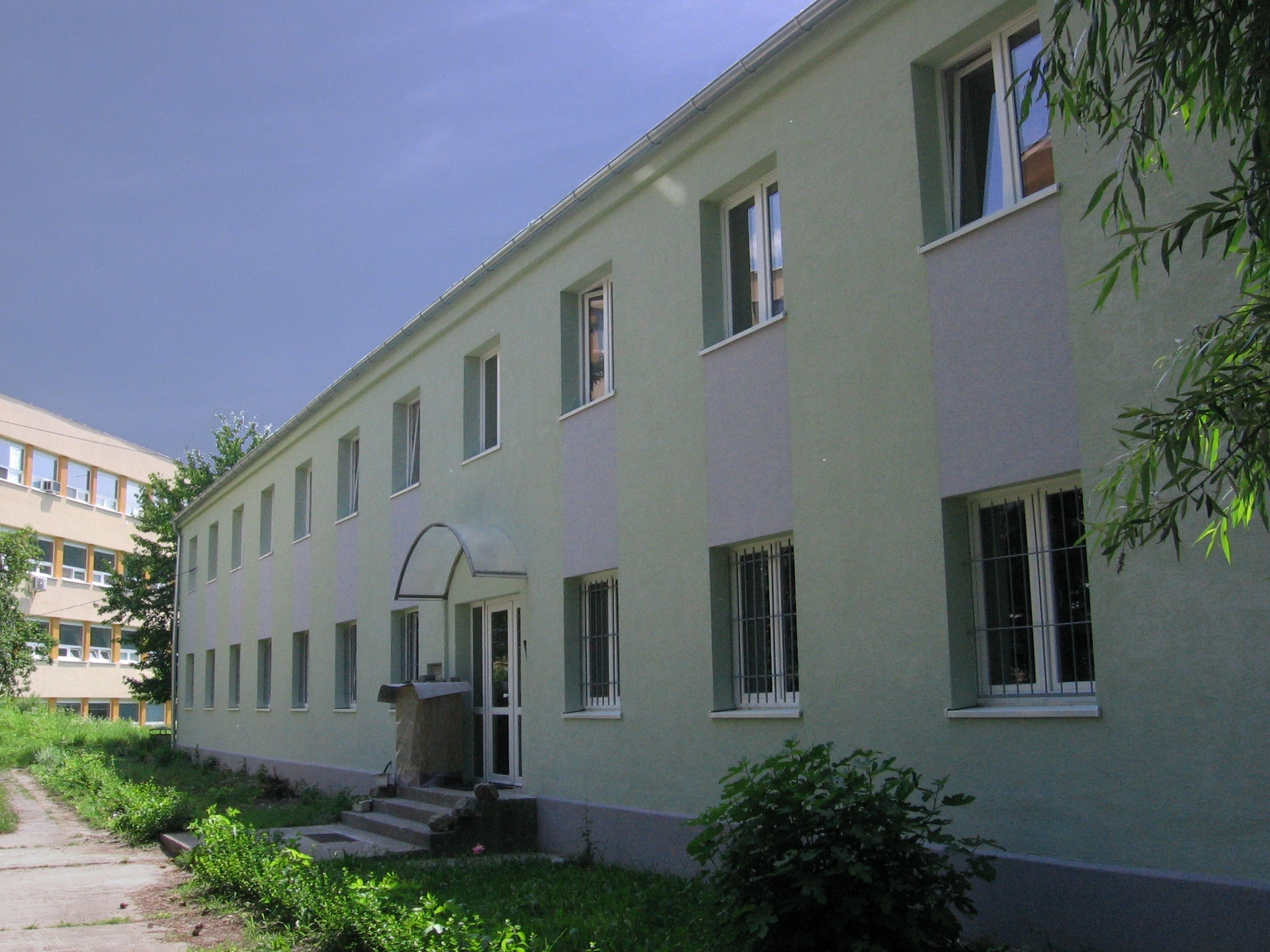
Institute of Geology of the Slovak Academy of Sciences at Patrónka

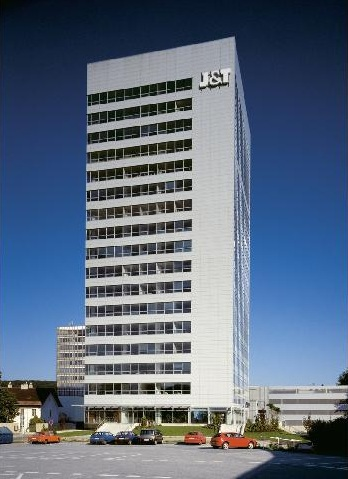
The 16 stories high Westend Tower
