= Nové Mesto, Bratislava =

Nové Mesto New Town
- Borough
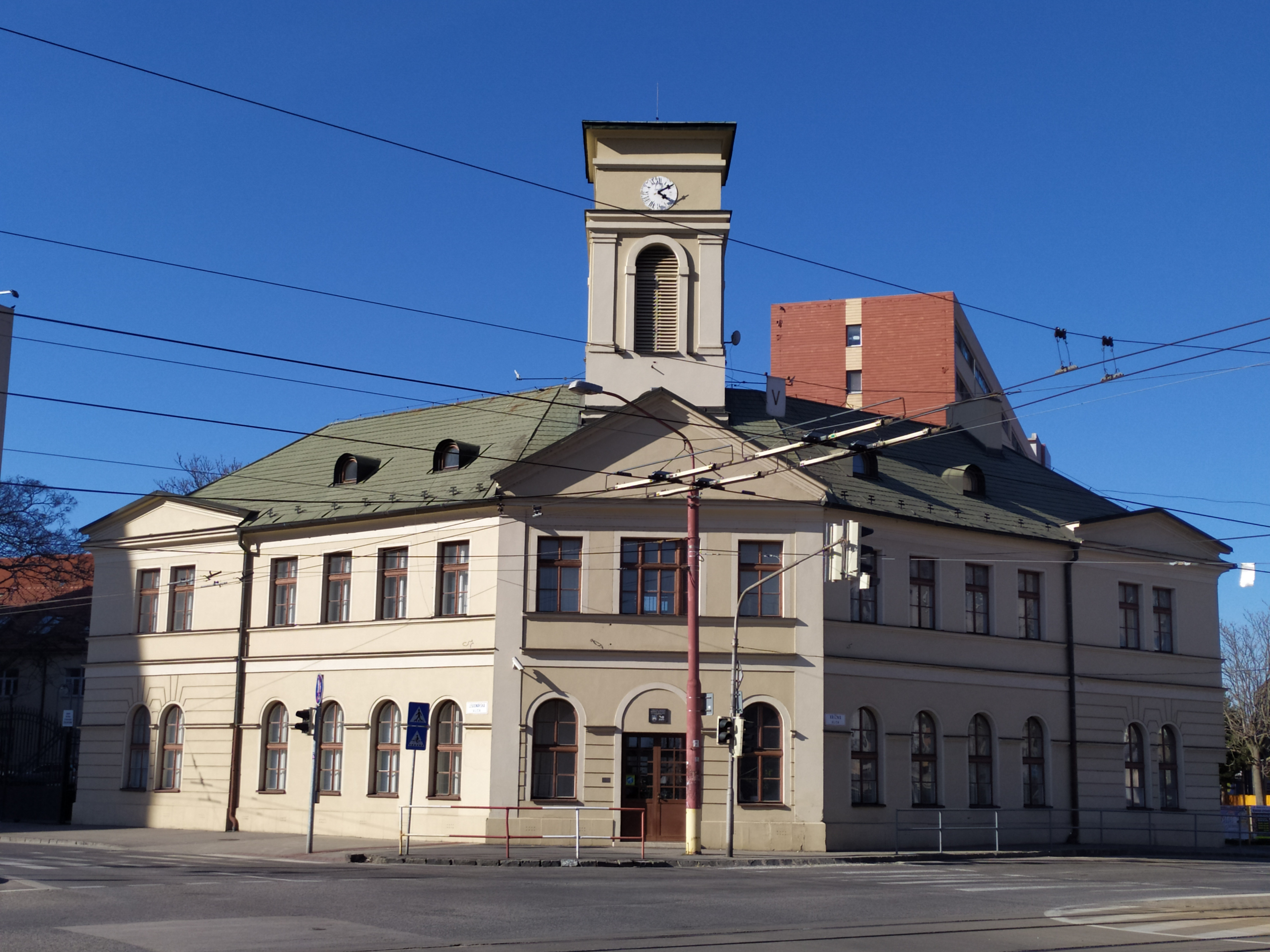
- Former horse railway station used in coat of arms

- Coat of arms

- Area of Nové Mesto in Bratislava

- Location of Nové Mesto in Slovakia
- Coordinates: 48°08′00″N 17°07′00″E
- Country: Slovakia
- Region: Bratislava Region
- District: Bratislava III
- First mentioned: 1279 (Julian)

Government
  - Mayor: Matúš Čupka

Area
  - Total: 37.48 km^{2} (14.47 sq mi)
- Elevation: 137 m (449 ft)

Population (2025)
  - Total: 45,966
- Time zone: UTC+1 (CET)
  - Summer (DST): UTC+2 (CEST)
- Postal code: 831 01, 831 02, 831 03, 831 04
- Area code: +421-2
- Vehicle registration plate (until 2022): BA, BL, BT
- Website: www.banm.sk

Nové Mesto (meaning New Town) is a borough of Bratislava, in the Bratislava III district. It is located north and north-east of the Old Town. The borough also borders Rača, Vajnory, Ružinov, Lamač and Záhorská Bystrica boroughs.

== Geography ==
The municipality lies at an altitude of 137 metres (449 ft) and covers an area of 37.48 km^{2} (14.47 sq mi) (2025).

== History ==
There was no compact settlement in the Middle Ages in the cadastral area of present-day borough, and for long it had countryside character. Three roads passed throughout the area: one from Bratislava to Modra, second to Vajnory and the third to Trnava and Nitra. The Little Carpathians part was almost untouched, with the exception of upper Mlynská dolina valley. The area started to have city-like character since the 18th century from two squares, which still have word "mýto" (meaning toll) in their name: Račianske mýto and Trnavské mýto, although no tolls are collected today. The parts of the city name was Nádorváros in the 19th century. Some of the factories established in the 19th century include Stein brewery in 1872–1873, Figaro chocolate factory in 1896 or Dynamit-Nobel dynamite factory in 1873. The area was massively urbanized in the 20th century.

== Population ==
Population statistic (10 years)
Year	1995	2005	2015	2025
Count	39,942	37,040	37,650	45,966
Difference		−7.26%	+1.64%	+22.08%

Population statistic
Year	2024	2025
Count	45,591	45,966
Difference		+0.82%

It has a population of 45,966 people (31 December 2025).

=== Ethnicity ===
Census 2021 (1+ %)
Ethnicity	Number	Fraction
Slovak	37,374	84.06%
Not found out	4847	10.9%
Hungarian	1003	2.25%
Czech	807	1.81%
Other	545	1.22%
Total	44,458	

In year 2021 was 44,458 people by ethnicity 37,374 as Slovak, 4847 as Not found out, 1003 as Hungarian, 807 as Czech, 545 as Other, 290 as Vietnamese, 202 as German, 193 as Rusyn, 186 as Ukrainian, 173 as Russian, 87 as French, 86 as Polish, 83 as Chinese, 75 as Italian, 63 as Jewish, 62 as Serbian, 58 as Croatian, 50 as Romanian, 46 as Austrian, 40 as Moravian, 40 as Bulgarian, 33 as Romani, 33 as Korean, 27 as Greek, 23 as Albanian, 20 as English, 16 as Turkish, 16 as Canadian, 9 as Irish, 6 as Iranian and 5 as Silesian.

Note on population: The difference values of population numbers in the table "Population statistic" and in the sections "Ethnicity" & "Religion" is caused by the use of various statistical methods.

=== Religion ===
Census 2021 (1+ %)
Religion	Number	Fraction
None	19,668	44.24%
Roman Catholic Church	15,529	34.93%
Not found out	4778	10.75%
Evangelical Church	1995	4.49%
Greek Catholic Church	483	1.09%
Total	44,458	

In year 2021 was 44,458 people by religion 19,668 from None, 15,529 from Roman Catholic Church, 4778 from Not found out, 1995 from Evangelical Church, 483 from Greek Catholic Church, 271 from Eastern Orthodox Church, 254 from Other, 253 from Ad hoc movements, 211 from Buddhism, 170 from Calvinist Church, 123 from Other and not ascertained christian church, 110 from Christian Congregations in Slovakia, 102 from Islam, 71 from Church of the Brethren, 69 from Jewish community, 69 from Jehovah's Witnesses, 62 from Apostolic Church, 56 from Baptists Church, 42 from Seventh-day Adventist Church, 39 from Paganism and natural spirituality, 28 from United Methodist Church, 27 from Czechoslovak Hussite Church, 19 from Bahá'i Community, 13 from Old Catholic Church, 12 from Hinduism, 3 from Church of Jesus Christ of Latter-day Saints and 1 from New Apostolic Church.

== Sport ==
During the World War II, as the borough of Petržalka was occupied by Nazi Germany and the city lost almost all sporting facilities, the city started building new facilities in locality known as Tehelné pole and later also Pasienky. The swimming pool was built as first in 1939. Another of the sporting facilities is the football stadium built in years 1939–1944, home of the ŠK Slovan Bratislava football club. In 1962, another football stadium, called Pasienky was built. The Ondrej Nepela Winter Sports Stadium, now called Samsung Arena, was built in 1938, but covered only twenty years later. Other venues include cycling stadium (built 1946, demolished 2010), indoor swimming pool Pasienky (built 1973), sports hall Mladosť (built 1987) and the National Tennis Centre (built 2003).

== Sights and places of interest ==
Nové Mesto is located near the Little Carpathians, and around half of the whole cadastral area is covered by Bratislava Forest Park, with one of the attractions being the Kamzík TV Tower. In the city itself, there is a station of horse-drawn railway from 1840 (leading to Svätý Jur at the time of opening) and the Nová doba Estate, a fine example of modernist architecture.
