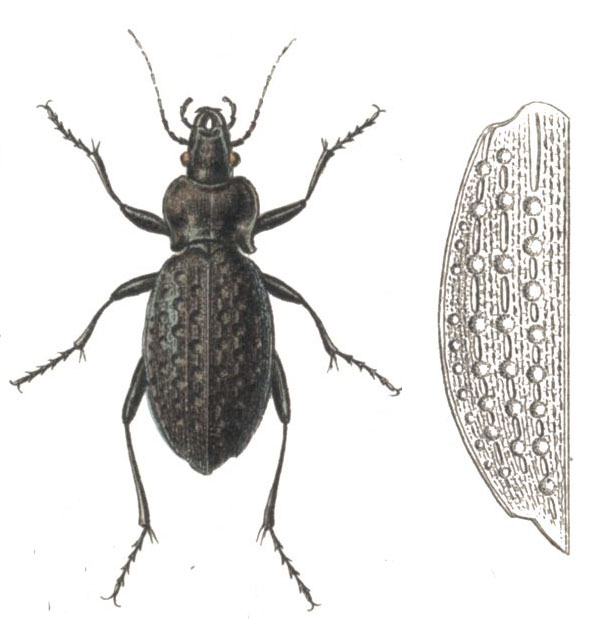

Scientific classification
- Kingdom: Animalia
- Phylum: Arthropoda
- Clade: Pancrustacea
- Class: Insecta
- Order: Coleoptera
- Suborder: Adephaga
- Family: Carabidae
- Genus: Carabus
- Species: C. variolosus

Binomial name
- Carabus variolosus Fabricius, 1787

Synonyms
- Hygrocarabus variolosus

= Carabus variolosus =

Species of beetle

Carabus variolosus is a species of black coloured ground beetle in the Carabinae subfamily that can be found in Bulgaria, Czech Republic, Moldova, Poland, Romania, Slovakia, Ukraine, Slovenia, Croatia, Serbia, Montenegro, Bosnia-Herzegovina, Germany and North Macedonia.
