= Vydrica (river) =

Coordinates: 48°09′N 17°04′E

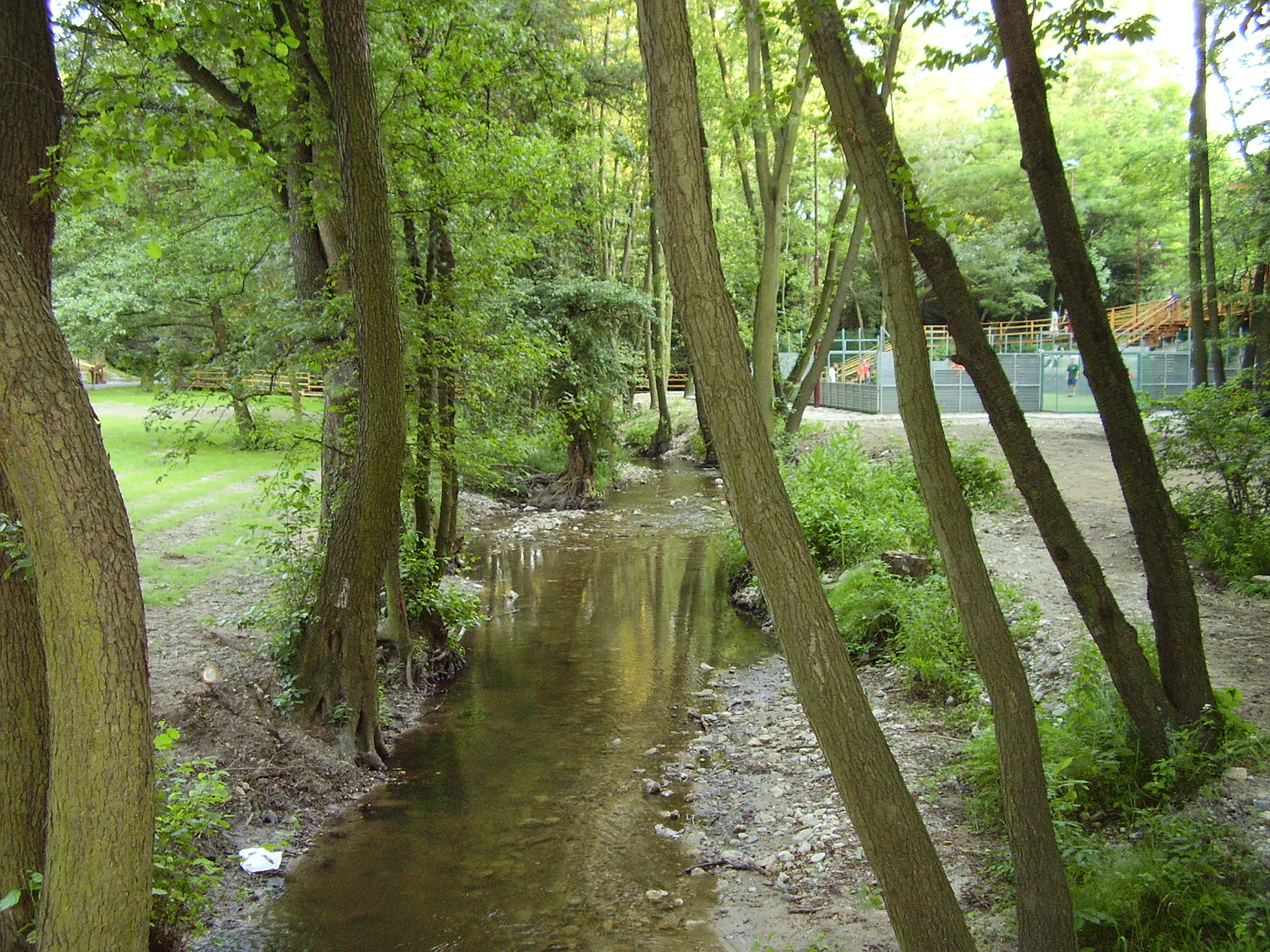
- Vydrica near Železná studienka, part of the Bratislava Forest Park in Bratislava

Location
- Country: Slovakia
- Region: Little Carpathians

Physical characteristics
- Source
  - location: Dubové near Biely kríž
  - elevation: 450 m (1,480 ft) above sea level
- Mouth
  - location: Danube
- Length: 17 km (11 mi)
- Discharge
  - average: 220 L/s (7.8 cu ft/s)

Basin features
- Progression: Danube→ Black Sea
- Tributaries
  - right: Bystrička

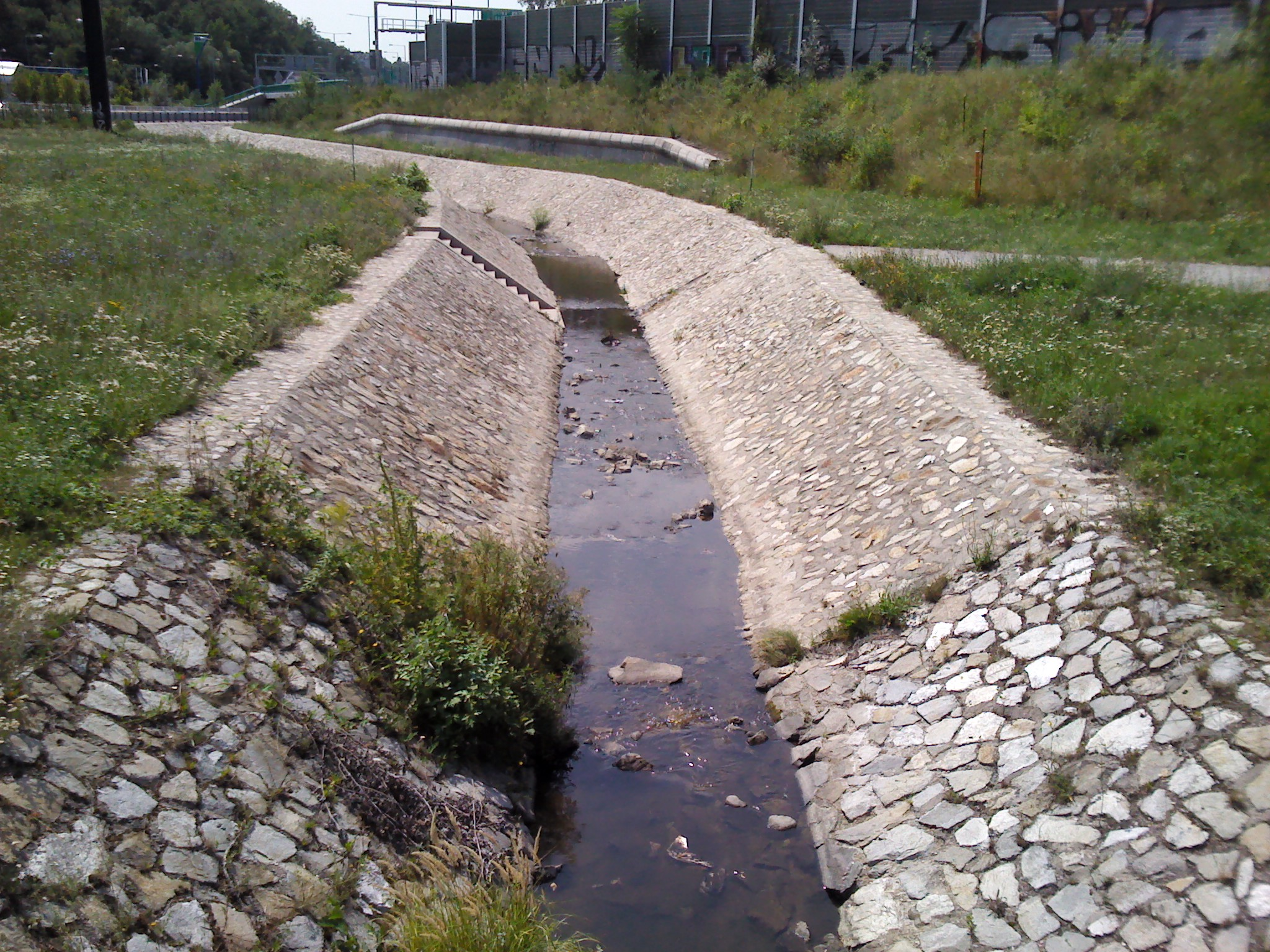
Vydrica at Mlynská dolina, close to Sitina Tunnel

Vydrica (Hungarian: Vödric, German: Weidritz) is a small 17 km long river in south-western Slovakia, which originates in the Little Carpathians mountains at about 450 m AMSL and flows into the Danube through the capital Bratislava.

The river passes through the Bratislava Forest Park and enters the Danube in Karlova Ves borough. Some localities along the river are part of Natura 2000. It is one of few rivers in Slovakia to flow directly into the Danube.

== Geography ==
Vydrica originates underneath the Biely kríž col underneath the Malý Javorník peak, in an area called Dubové. It flows south-west through the Bratislava Forest Park, collecting an unknown tributary and feeding two man-made water basins. It turns towards west creating four meanders in 2 kilometers of its length and close to the quarry underneath the Hrubý vrch mountain (394,0 AMSL) it turns again towards south. Vydrica then flows around the Hrubý Drieňovec mountain (396,7 ASML) and it collects its right tributary Bystrička as it enters the area of the upper Mlynská dolina and flows through Partizánska lúka (Partisan meadow) and the neighboring Železná studienka (Iron well), where it feeds four fish ponds. This area served for leisure and relaxation since the 19th century.

Vydrica then flows mainly southward through Patrónka, lower Mlynská dolina until it enters the Danube near the Lafranconi bridge and the Botanical Garden of the Comenius University. During the bridge's construction, Vydrica was canalized in this section.

== Flora and fauna ==
The Vydrica stream basin contains rare and endangered molluscs.

== See also ==
- Geography of Bratislava
- List of rivers of Slovakia

== Gallery ==
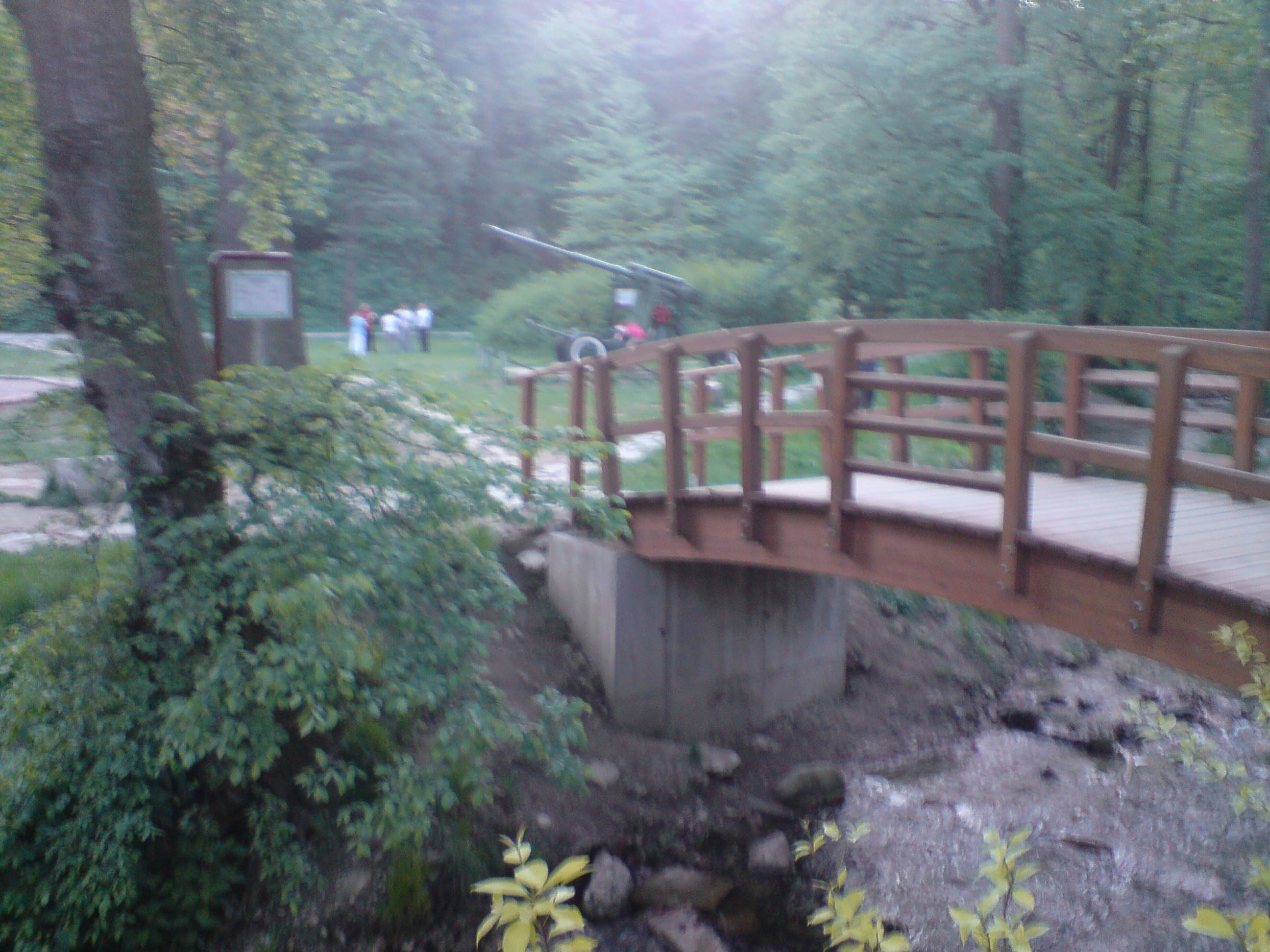
A bridge over Vydrica at Železná studienka

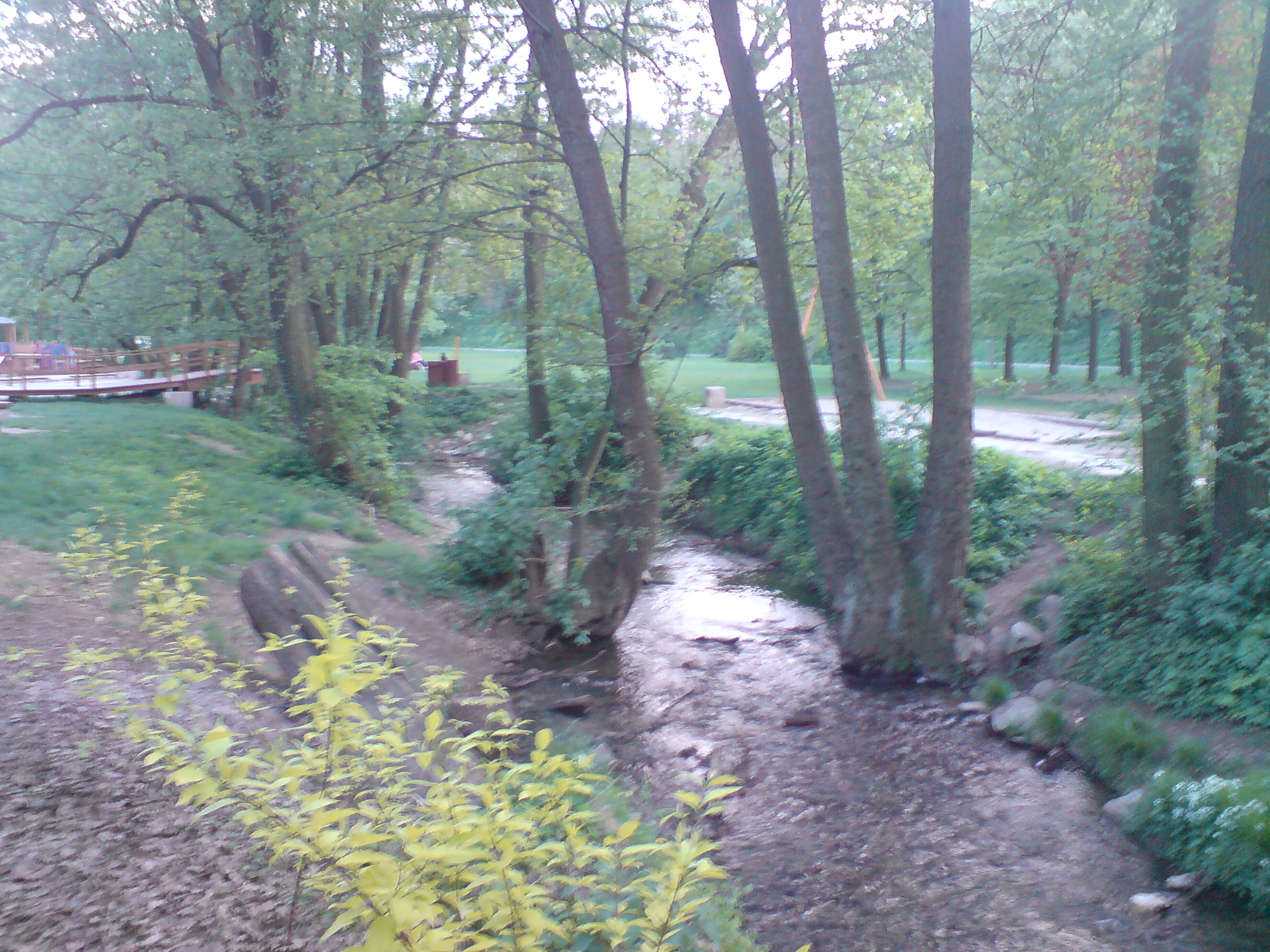
Vydrica flowing through Železná studienka

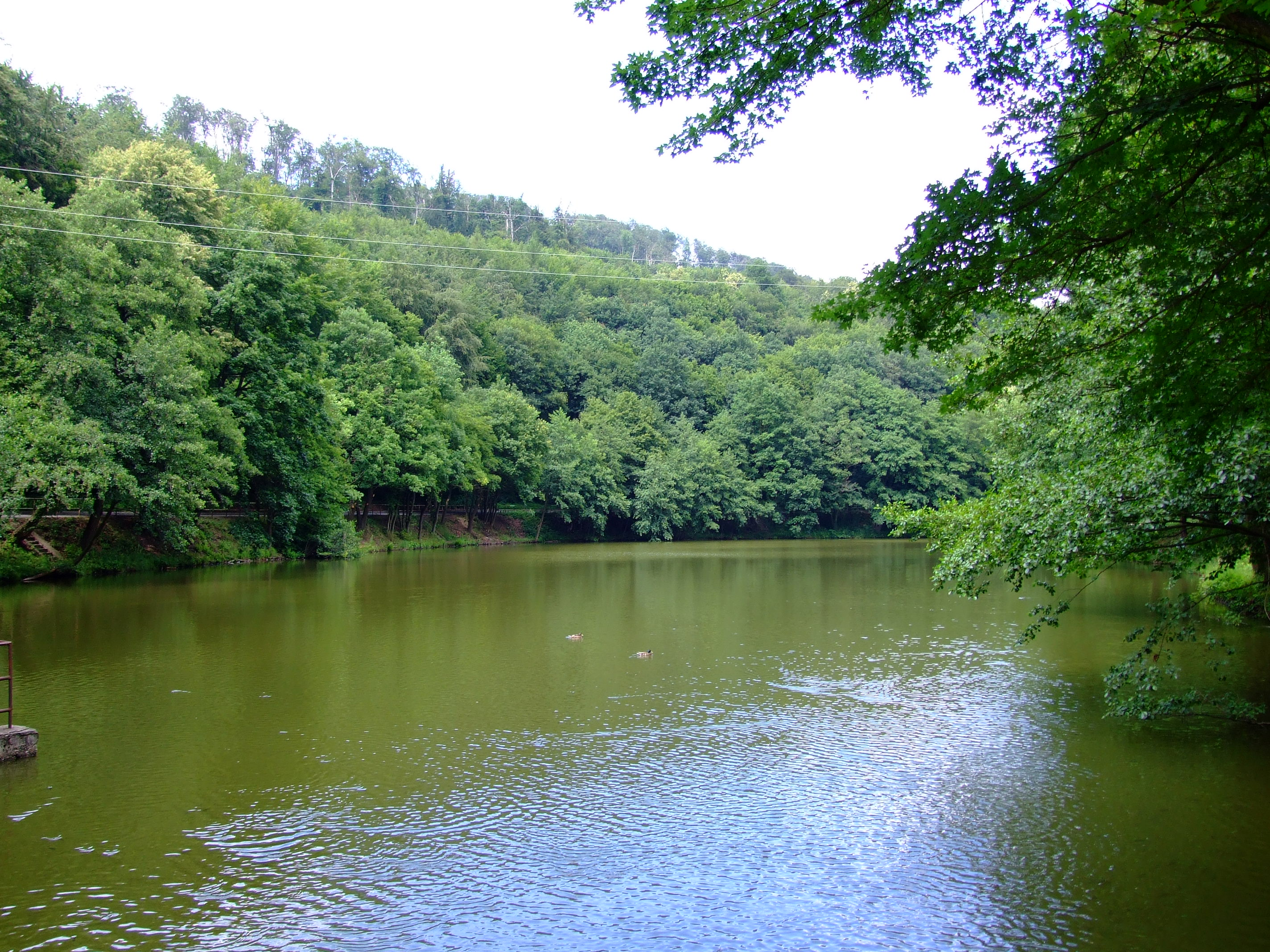
One of the ponds at the Vydrica in the Bratislava Forest Park

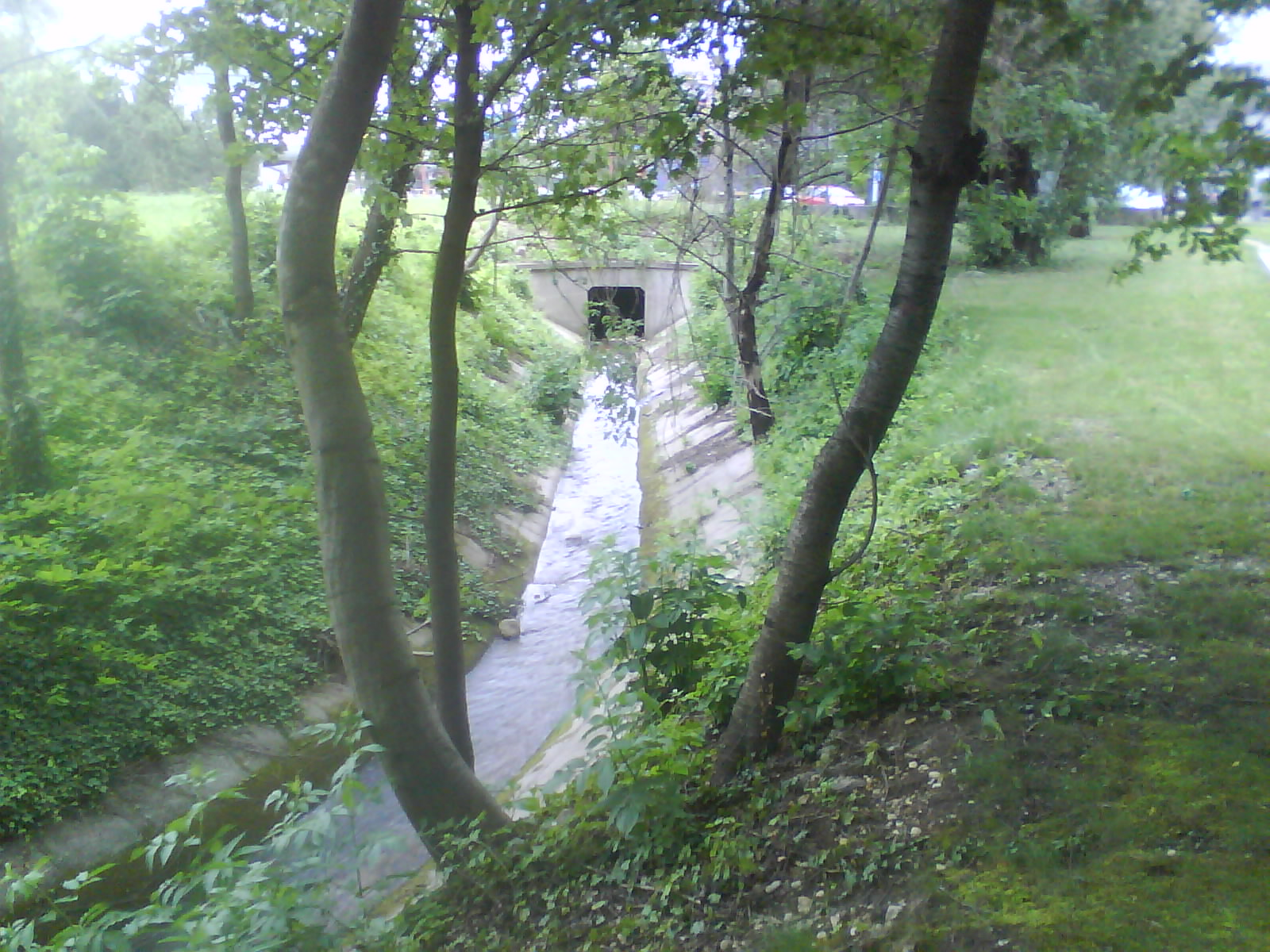
Vydrica at Patrónka
