= Kamzík TV Tower =

Transmission tower in Bratislava, Slovakia

Coordinates: 48°10′57″N 17°05′41″E

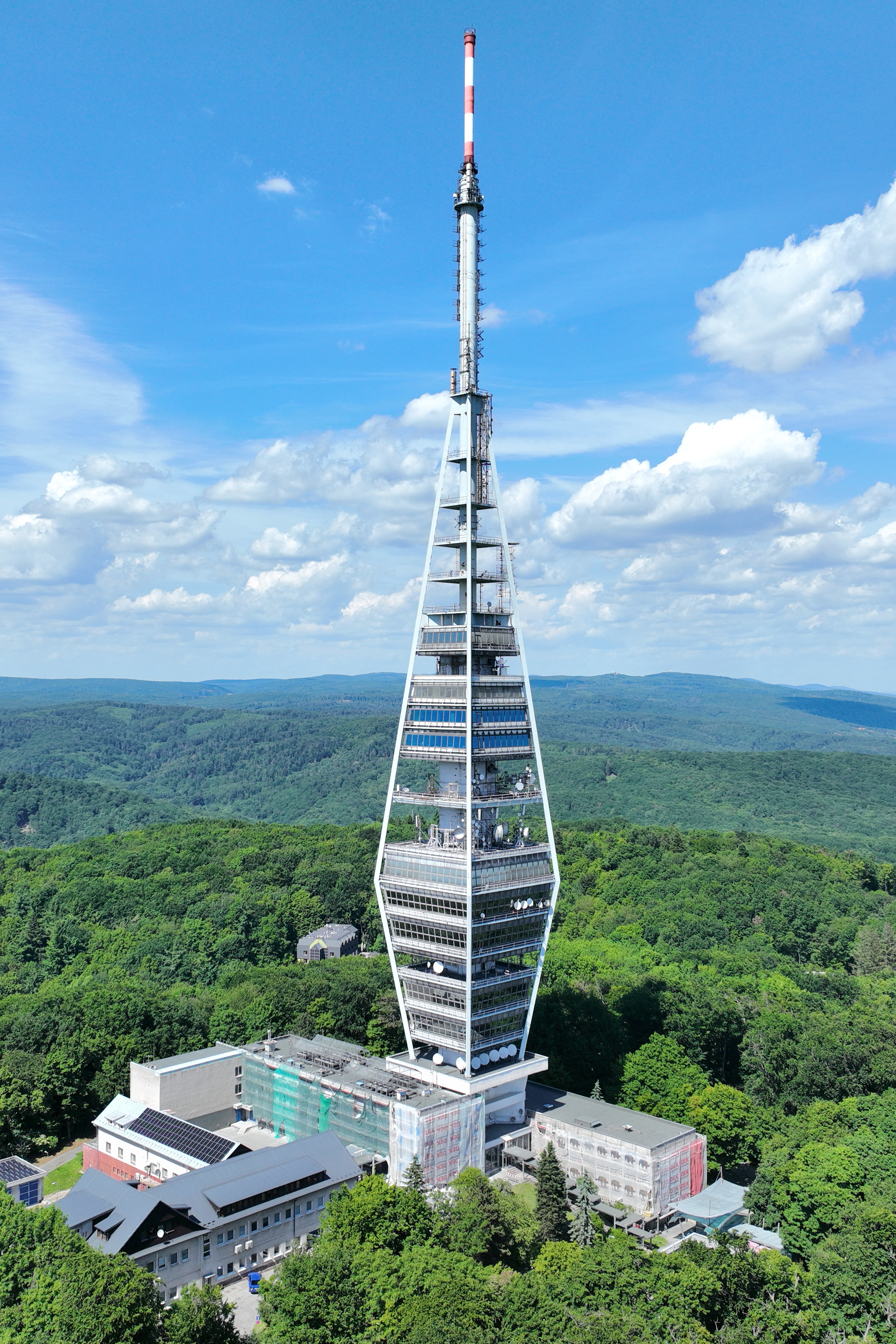
South-southwest view of the Kamzík TV Tower in Bratislava

The Kamzík TV Tower is a 196-metre (643 ft) tall television transmission tower in the Koliba area of Bratislava, the capital of Slovakia. The tower sits 437 m (1,434 ft) above sea level on the Kamzík hill, part of the Little Carpathians, overlooking much of the city. The tower lies within the territory of the Bratislava Forest Park. It was constructed in 1975, replacing a previous transmission tower. The tower was designed by architects Stanislav Májek, Jakub Tomašák, Juraj Kozák, Milan Jurica and Ján Privitzer.

The tower has a public observation deck. In conditions of good visibility, Austria, Hungary and the Czech Republic are visible from the tower.

== Restaurant ==
The VEŽA restaurant closed in 2010. The restaurant's chefs and staff moved to the West Restaurant at the Best Western West Hotel about 100 m (330 ft) down the tower approach road.

In 2011, a new restaurant named Altitude opened with an updated interior, serving Mediterranean cuisine. The restaurant is divided into an observation cafe bar, another restaurant, Brasseria, on one floor and the main restaurant on the floor below with rotating tables which provide a 360-degree panoramic view.

== FM radio ==
Frequency (MHz)	Station	ERP
89.3	Rádio FM	10.00 kW
93.8	Rádio Lumen	5.60 kW
94.3	Fun Radio	90.00 kW
96.6	Rádio Slovensko	100.00 kW
99.3	Rádio Regina	10.00 kW
101.8	Rádio Viva	89.00 kW
104.4	Rádio Devín	5.00 kW
104.8	Europa 2	50.00 kW
106.6	Jemné Melódie	10.00 kW
107.6	Rádio Expres	10.00 kW

== Television ==
- DVB-T

== See also ==
- List of towers
