= Bratislava 1 =

Coordinates: 48.1486°N 17.1019°E

Bratislava I District
- District
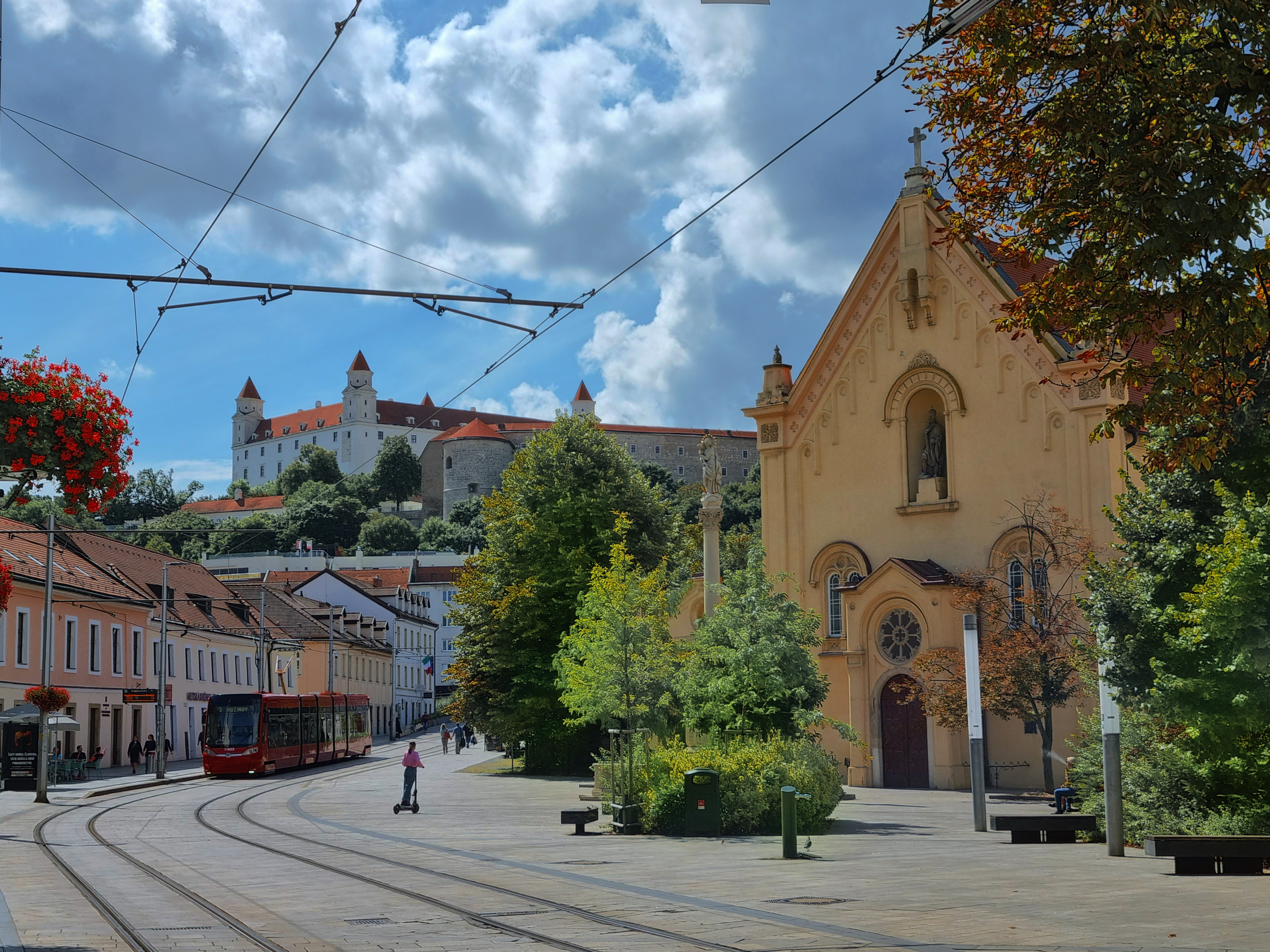
- Country: Slovakia
- Region (kraj): Bratislava Region
- Seat: Bratislava

Area
  - Total: 9.59 km^{2} (3.70 sq mi)

Population (2025)
  - Total: 47,896
- Time zone: UTC+1 (CET)
  - Summer (DST): UTC+2 (CEST)
- Telephone prefix: 02
- Vehicle registration plate (until 2022): BA, BL, BT, BD, BE, BI
- Boroughs: 1

Bratislava I (Slovak: okres Bratislava I; Hungarian: Pozsonyi I. járás) is a district in the city of Bratislava. It is identical with its sole borough, Bratislava's Old Town (Slovak: Staré mesto; German: Altstadt; Hungarian: Óváros). With an area of 10 square kilometers, it is the smallest district of Slovakia. It is completely surrounded by other Bratislava districts: Bratislava II, Bratislava III, Bratislava IV and Bratislava V.

== Location ==
For administrative purposes, according to VZN No. 6/2001, the Old Town of Bratislava has total area of 124 meters squared. Old Town's western boundary is the eastern wall of the original Botanical Garden of the Comenius University area, today running partly though a parking lot underneath the Lanfranconi Bridge, the boundary then crosses the tram lines of the Nábr. arm. gen. L. Svobodu Street and continues through the eastern side of the Mlynská dolina Street until the State Geological Institute of Dionýz Štúr on Patrónka where the boundary crosses to the other side of the street, continuing to the junction of Lamačská cesta – Cesta na Červený most, then it crosses the railway line Malacky - Bratislava near Bratislava Železná studienka railway station where it sharply turns towards south-east.

Old Town's northern boundary is the northern side of the Malacky - Bratislava railway line, it continues through the eastern part of Opavská Street, it crosses the Limbová Street at the place of the underpass underneath the railway tracks, continues through the northern side of the railway line and the southern side of Opavská Street. At the crossing of Opavská Street and Ďurgalova Street it bends northwards and continues through the northern side of the Pražská Street, it crosses the Stromová Street and again continues through the northern side of the Malacky - Bratislava railway line. The boundary then continues around the northern edge of the Bratislava main railway station and at the crossing of Jaskov Rad Street and Pod Strážami Street it turns to the southeast. It continues through the western side of the underpass underneath the railway tracks and then it turns to the northeast and continues through the northern side of the Dobšinského Street until its crossing with Smrečianska Street.

== Population ==
Historical population
Year	Pop.	±%
1970	79,316	—
1980	59,547	−24.9%
1991	49,018	−17.7%
2001	44,798	−8.6%
2011	38,655	−13.7%
2021	46,080	+19.2%
Source: Censuses

Population statistic (10 years)
Year	1995	2005	2015	2025
Count	47,896	42,241	39,470	47,896
Difference		−11.80%	−6.55%	+21.34%

Population statistic
Year	2024	2025
Count	47,635	47,896
Difference		+0.54%

It has a population of 47,896 people (31 December 2025).

=== Ethnicity ===
Census 2021 (1+ %)
Ethnicity	Number	Fraction
Slovak	37,280	76.01%
Not found out	5982	12.19%
Hungarian	1283	2.61%
Czech	1014	2.06%
Other	999	2.03%
Total	49,045	

In year 2021 was 49,045 people by ethnicity 37,280 as Slovak, 5982 as Not found out, 1283 as Hungarian, 1014 as Czech, 999 as Other, 417 as German, 245 as Ukrainian, 232 as Russian, 228 as Jewish, 196 as Rusyn, 161 as Italian, 158 as French, 102 as Romani, 97 as Bulgarian, 87 as Polish, 82 as Austrian, 71 as Greek, 55 as Moravian, 55 as Croatian, 50 as Serbian, 41 as Romanian, 40 as English, 33 as Albanian, 25 as Vietnamese, 25 as Canadian, 22 as Turkish, 21 as Iranian, 17 as Irish, 17 as Korean, 9 as Chinese and 1 as Silesian.

Note on population: The difference values of population numbers in the table "Population statistic" and in the sections "Ethnicity" & "Religion" is caused by the use of various statistical methods.

=== Religion ===
Census 2021 (1+ %)
Religion	Number	Fraction
None	19,948	43.29%
Roman Catholic Church	15,008	32.57%
Not found out	5951	12.91%
Evangelical Church	2341	5.08%
Total	46,080	

In year 2021 was 46,080 people by religion 19,948 from None, 15,008 from Roman Catholic Church, 5951 from Not found out, 2341 from Evangelical Church, 458 from Greek Catholic Church, 319 from Eastern Orthodox Church, 303 from Other, 245 from Jewish community, 218 from Other and not ascertained christian church, 212 from Ad hoc movements, 195 from Buddhism, 162 from Calvinist Church, 131 from Church of the Brethren, 100 from Islam, 94 from Jehovah's Witnesses, 81 from Christian Congregations in Slovakia, 68 from Baptists Church, 56 from Apostolic Church, 36 from Paganism and natural spirituality, 35 from United Methodist Church, 30 from Czechoslovak Hussite Church, 30 from Seventh-day Adventist Church, 23 from Old Catholic Church, 19 from Hinduism, 12 from Bahá'i Community and 5 from Church of Jesus Christ of Latter-day Saints.

== Boroughs ==
Borough	Area [km^{2}]	Population
Old Town	9.59	47,896

Population and area values are current for year 2025.
