= Boroughs and localities of Bratislava =

Division of Bratislava into districts (by color) and boroughs

Cadastral division of Bratislava

Bratislava, the capital city of Slovakia, is divided into five national administrative districts (Slovak: okres: I, II, III, IV, V) and into 17 boroughs (Slovak: mestské časti; literally: city parts, also translated as (city) districts or wards). These boroughs vary in size and population, from the smallest Lamač and least populated Čunovo to the largest Podunajské Biskupice and most populated Petržalka.

Each of the boroughs has its own mayor and council. The number of councillors in each depends on the size and population of that borough. Mayor and the local council are elected in municipal election every four years. The boroughs are responsible for issues of local significance such as urban planning, local roads maintenance, budget, local ordinances, parks maintenance, safety and so on.

Cadastral areas coincide with boroughs, except in two cases: Nové Mesto is further divided into the Nové Mesto and Vinohrady cadastral areas and Ružinov is divided into Ružinov, Nivy and Trnávka. Further divisions often, but not always include various unofficial quarters and localities.

Until 1943, Bratislava consisted more or less of the boroughs Staré Mesto, Nové Mesto and a part of Ružinov. That year, the village of Karlova Ves was annexed to Bratislava. In 1946, the formerly independent villages of Devín, Dúbravka, Lamač, Petržalka, Prievoz (part of Ružinov), Rača and Vajnory were annexed to Bratislava, increasing the total area of the city to 193.6 km^{2}. The last territorial expansion of Bratislava to date occurred in 1972, with the villages of Devínska Nová Ves, Záhorska Bystrica, Vrakuňa, Podunajské Biskupice, Jarovce, Rusovce and Čunovo being annexed, creating the so-called Greater Bratislava (Veľká Bratislava) with an area of 367.5 km^{2}. This was done in order to gain more space for massive apartments construction, which resulted in population growth from 143,000 in 1946 to around 450,000 in 1989.

The following table gives an overview of the boroughs, along with the district, population, area, founding or annexation date (if applicable) and location within Bratislava.

Borough and district	Population	Area (km^{2})	Annexed	Location
Staré Mesto (I)	42,546 (▲)	9.59	n/a	
Ružinov (II)	74,408 (▲)	39.7	1946	
Vrakuňa (II)	20,107 (▼)	10.29	1972	
Podunajské Biskupice (II)	22,154 (▼)	42.49	1972	
Nové Mesto (III)	40,246 (▲)	37.48	n/a	
Rača (III)	24,419 (▲)	23.65	1946	
Vajnory (III)	5,976 (▲)	13.53	1946	
Karlova Ves (IV)	33,228 (▼)	10.95	1943	
Dúbravka (IV)	33,740 (▲)	8.64	1946	
Lamač (IV)	7,457 (▲)	6.54	1946	
Devín (IV)	1,734 (▲)	13.98	1946	
Devínska Nová Ves (IV)	15,817 (▲)	24.21	1972	
Záhorská Bystrica (IV)	6,428 (▲)	32.3	1972	
Petržalka (V)	104,376 (▲)	28.68	1946	
Jarovce (V)	2,580 (▲)	21.34	1972	
Rusovce (V)	4,175 (▲)	25.55	1972	
Čunovo (V)	1,557 (▲)	18.62	1972	
Total	440,948 (▲)	367		

The following table shows various quarters or localities in the boroughs.

Administrative and Territorial Division of Bratislava
Districts	Borough	Quarters or Localities
Bratislava I	Staré Mesto	
Bratislava II	Ružinov	Nivy, Pošeň, Prievoz, Ostredky, Trávniky, Štrkovec, Vlčie hrdlo, Trnávka
Bratislava II	Vrakuňa	Dolné hony
Bratislava II	Podunajské Biskupice	Dolné hony, Ketelec, Lieskovec, Medzi jarkami
Bratislava III	Nové Mesto	Ahoj, Jurajov dvor, Koliba, Kramáre, Mierová kolónia, Pasienky/Kuchajda, Vinohrady
Bratislava III	Rača	Krasňany, Rača, Východné, Žabí majer
Bratislava III	Vajnory	
Bratislava IV	Karlova Ves	Dlhé diely, Kútiky, Mlynská dolina, Rovnice
Bratislava IV	Dúbravka	Podvornice, Záluhy, Krčace
Bratislava IV	Lamač	Podháj, Rázsochy
Bratislava IV	Devín	
Bratislava IV	Devínska Nová Ves	Devínske Jazero, Kostolné, Paulinské, Podhorské, Sídlisko Stred, Vápenka
Bratislava IV	Záhorská Bystrica	Plánky, Podkerepušky, Strmé vŕšky
Bratislava V	Petržalka	Dvory, Háje, Janíkov dvor, Lúky, Ovsište, Kopčany, Zrkadlový háj, Kapitulský dvor, Starý háj
Bratislava V	Jarovce	
Bratislava V	Rusovce	
Bratislava V	Čunovo	

== Bibliography ==
- Lacika, Ján (2000). Bratislava. Poznávame Slovensko (in Slovak) (1st ed.). Bratislava, Slovakia: DAJAMA. ISBN 80-88975-14-X.
