= Botanical Garden of the Comenius University =

Botanical garden in Bratislava, Slovakia

Coordinates: 48°08′50.2″N 17°04′22.1″E

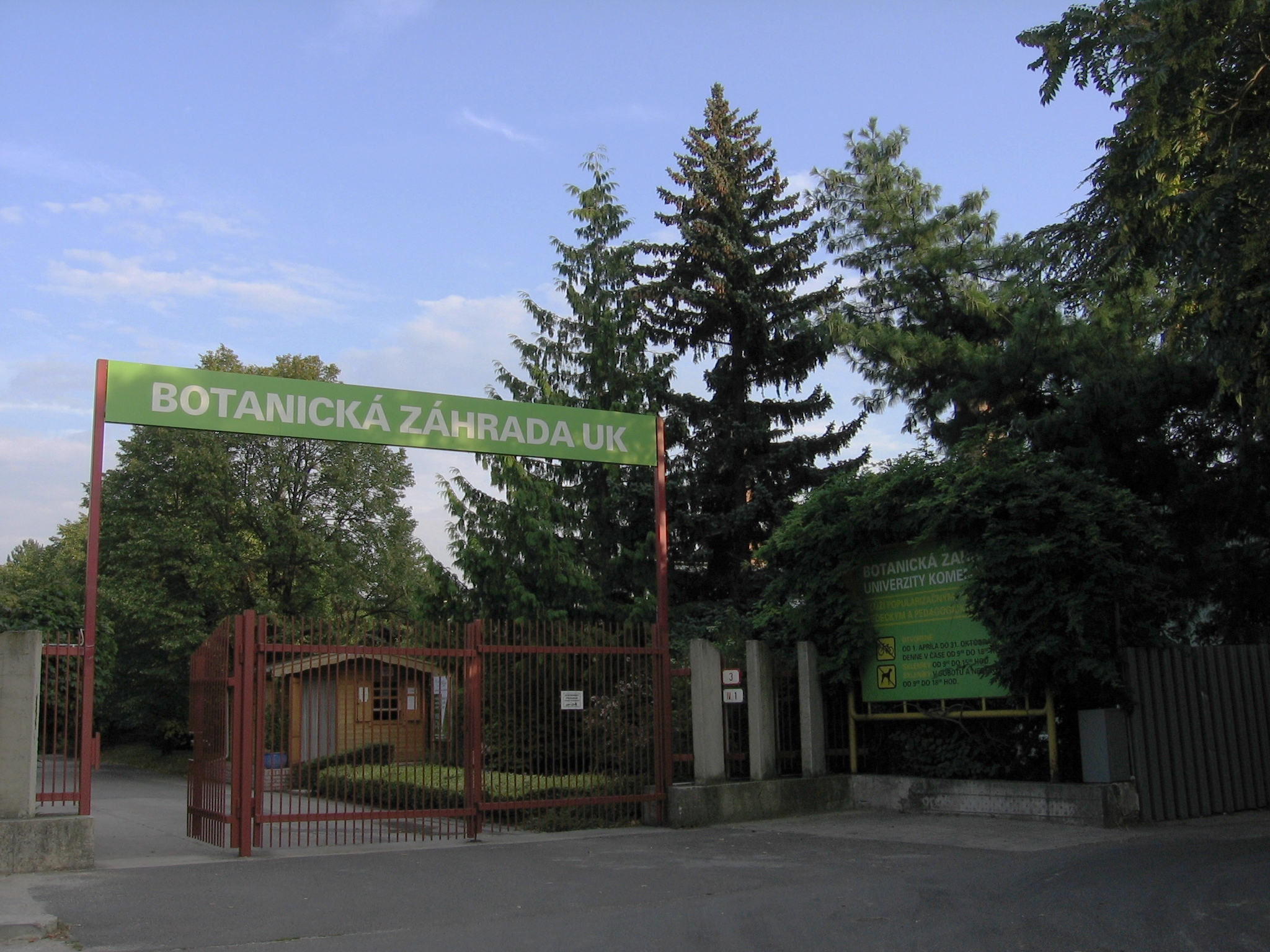
- Entrance of the Botanical Garden of the Comenius University in Bratislava
- Interactive map of Botanical Garden of the Comenius University
- Type: Botanical garden
- Location: Botanická Street No. 3, Mlynská dolina neighborhood of Karlova Ves
- Area: 6.6 hectares (66,000 m^{2})
- Created: 1942
- Operator: Comenius University
- Open: from April to October

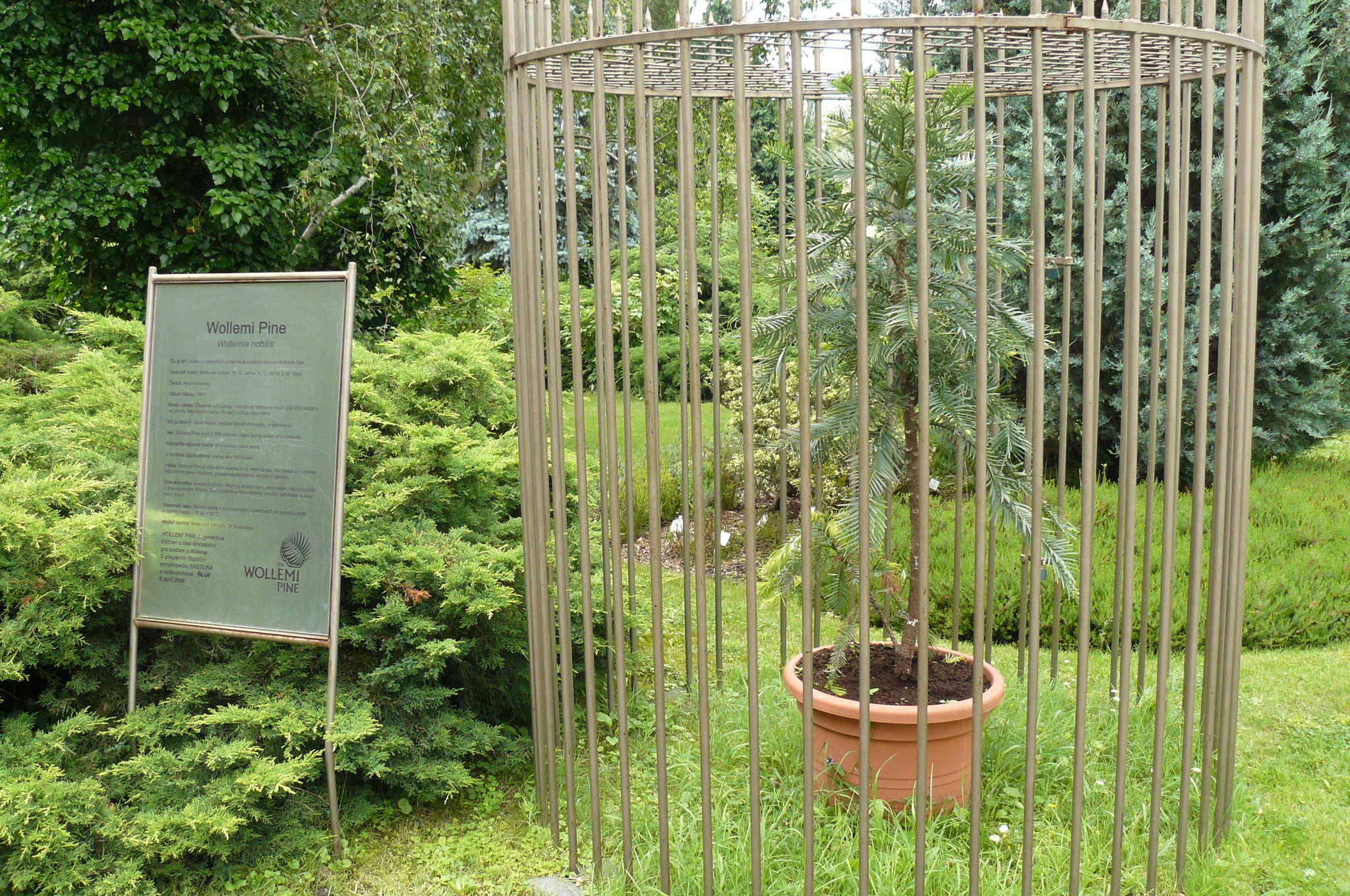
Wollemia nobilis inside the Botanical Garden of the Comenius University in Bratislava

Botanical Garden of the Comenius University (Slovak: Botanická záhrada UK) is the only botanical garden in Bratislava, the capital of Slovakia. It is located in the Karlova Ves borough, next to the Old Town district and the Lafranconi Bridge by the Bratislava Riverfront and it contains over 4,000 plant species (including 1,200 species of cacti) covering an area of 6.6 hectares.

Botanical Garden of the Comenius University is a scientific and pedagogical institution administered by the Comenius University. Its purpose is the maintenance and expansion of its collection of living plants, providing educational support, and providing expert botanical information to the public. It also serves as a facility for experimental acclimatization of non-local plant species for use in forestry and orchard farming. Botanical Garden of the Comenius University is the oldest public botanical garden in Slovakia. It is open to the public from 1 April to 31 October each year during the daytime, and visitors have to pay an entry fee.

== History ==
In the 16th century the medical doctor Juraj Purkircher (1530-1578), a citizen of Bratislava (known under various names throughout its history), had a small botanical garden next to his house which was visited by the famous botanist Carolus Clusius during his trip to the Kingdom of Hungary. In the year 1653, the Archbishop of Esztergom György Lippay transformed the garden of the Episcopal Summer Palace in Bratislava into a botanical garden designed to serve scientific and popularisation needs. It was the first botanical garden of this type in the Kingdom of Hungary.

Botanical Garden of the Comenius University was established on 23 January 1942 by the decree of the Ministry of Education and Propaganda. Its construction was supervised by professor František Nábělek, Head of the Botanical Office of the Slovak University, who became its first director. As the most suitable location for its establishment, it was decided to lay the foundations of the new botanical garden at the place around the villa of Mr. Lafranconi in Mlynská dolina. The land lot in question had 6,6 hectares of space, a constant water source due to the presence of the river Vydrica and the location was convenient for both students and citizens of Bratislava. Construction was carried out from 1942 to 1950 according to plans by František Jirásek. After the Second World War an irrigation system was built as well as greenhouses and over 3,000 plant species were planted.

The garden was opened on 4 July 1949 together with the opening of the Bratislava castle hill tunnel and the Slovanská cesta Street. At the end of the 1970s, the garden contained approximately 5,000 different plant species. In the 1980s, the area of the botanical garden was reduced due to the construction of the Lafranconi Bridge. In 1992, the greenhouses were considered technically unfit and they were reconstructed which caused all the greenhouse plants to be planted anew.

== Description ==
The Botanical Garden of the Comenius University has had 5 directors throughout its history, the current one has been Jaroslav Bella since 1991. The area of the botanical garden is also occasionally used for events, exhibitions and open-air summer musical concerts and it is a desired place for weddings. Since 1952, the botanical garden has successfully exchanged seeds with over 530 foreign botanical gardens.

=== Expositions ===
Current exposition is divided between greenhouse plants and outdoor plants. Indoor expositions feature for example an exposition of tropical and subtropical utility plants, an exhibition of Australian flora, a palm greenhouse and a cactus greenhouse. Outdoor expositions feature among others a small japanese garden and a rosarium with over 120 species of roses, one of the most popular parts of the garden.

=== Detached workplaces ===
Botanical Garden of the Comenius University features two detached workplaces:

- Blatnica - is a phyto-gene fund in Blatnica, Slovakia, 8 hectares in area. Research here is focused on the ecology of endangered plant species in natural ecosystems of the Western Carpathians.
- Stupava - is a plant laboratory in Stupava, Slovakia, 20 hectares in area. It provides facilities for research and development of new plant species, especially peaches and apricots, and also for research of endangered plant species of the local lowlands and hills. Its dendrological collection includes 238 different species.

== See also ==
- History of Bratislava
- Bratislava Zoo
- List of botanical gardens
