= St. Francis Square (Bratislava) =

Square in Bratislava, Slovakia

Coordinates: 14.5981°N 120.9830°E

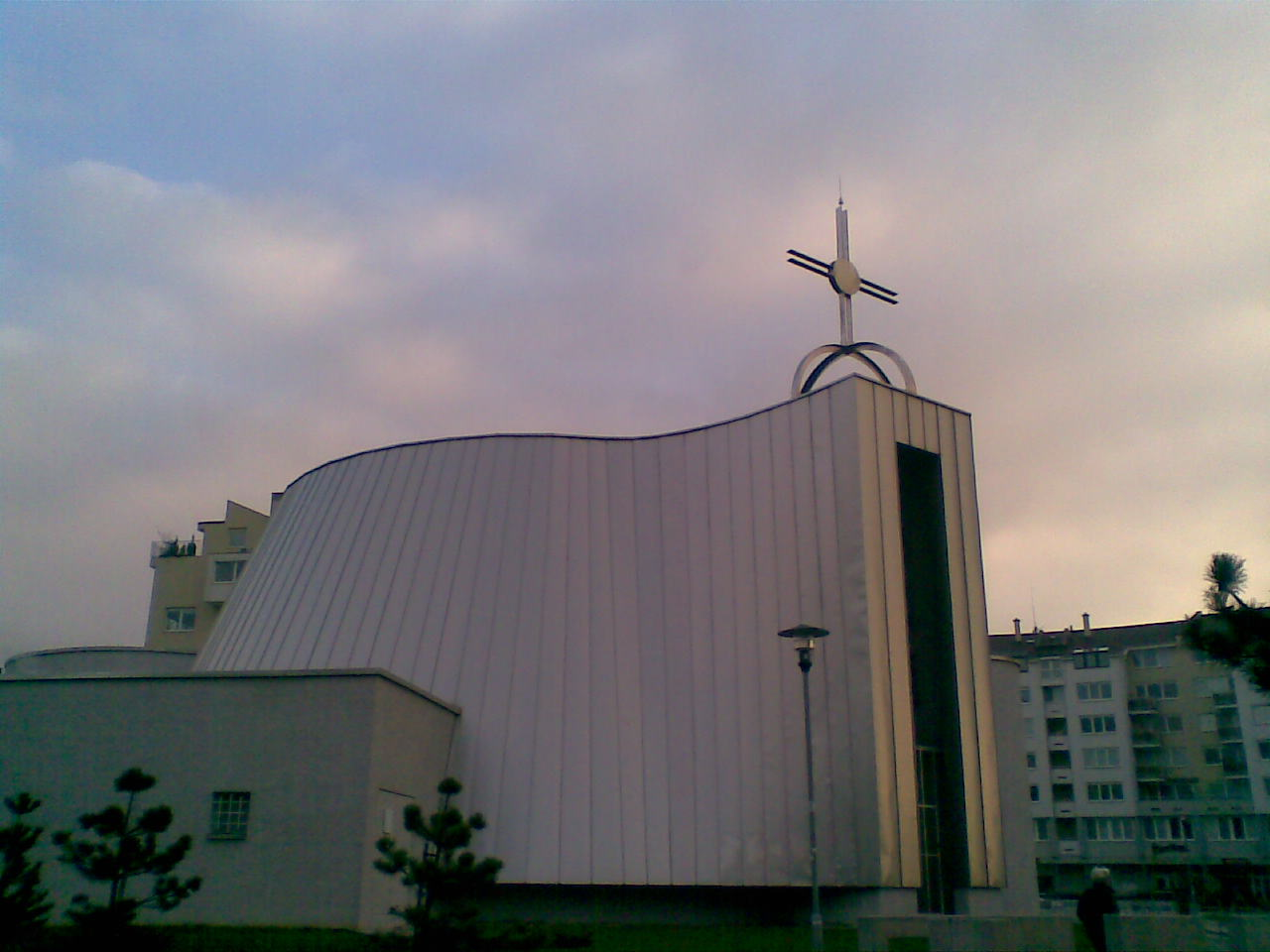
Church of St. Francis of Assisi (side view)

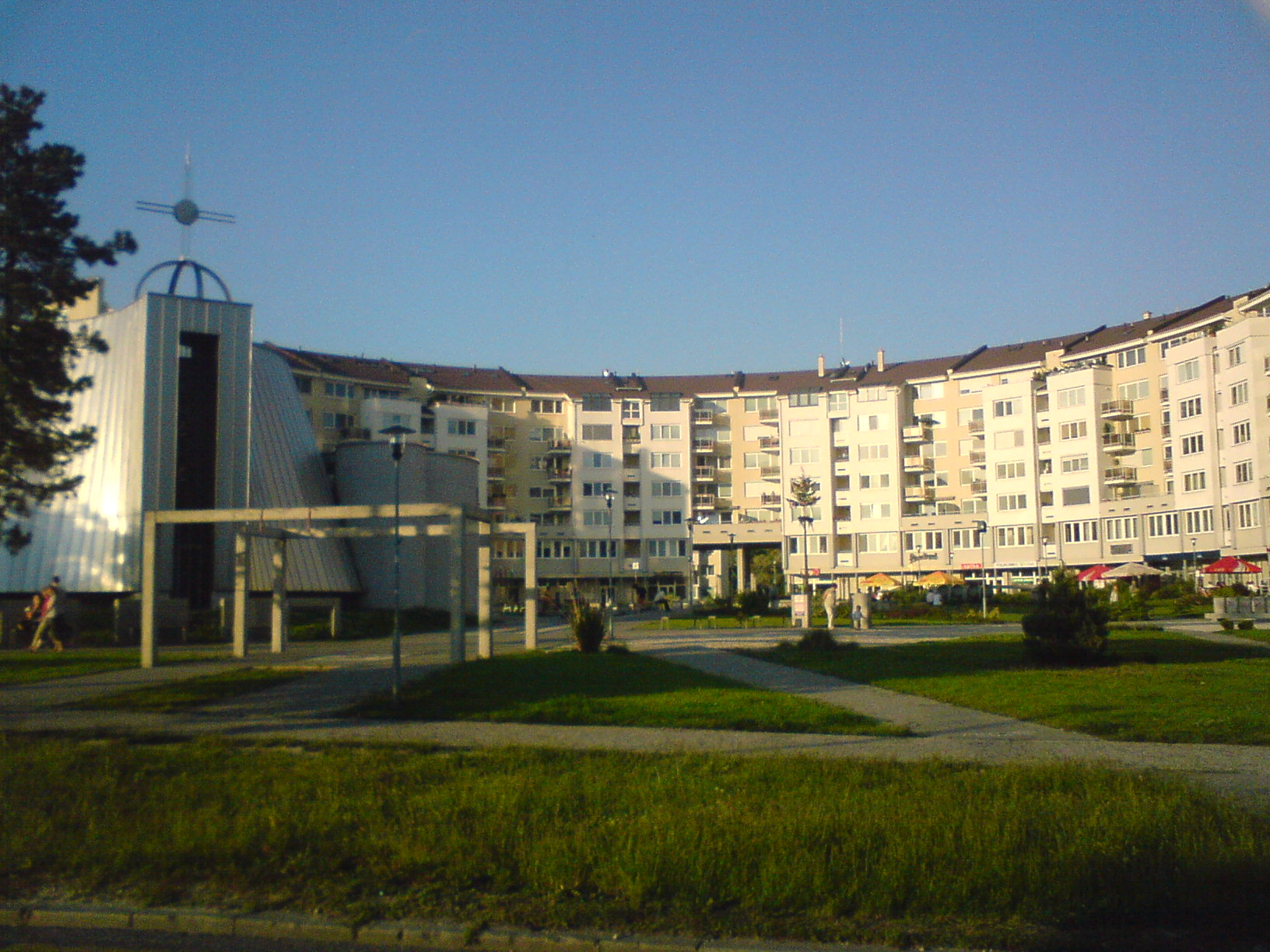
St. Francis Square (front view)

St. Francis Square is situated in the Karlova Ves borough of Bratislava, Slovakia. It also is a part of the Bratislava IV district. St. Francis Square was opened in 2004. Already in March 2005 they had a problem with collapse. Therefore, it was closed for one more year and was finished and finally opened in May 2006. The square is designed to a shape of a circle. There is a nice fountain in the center of the circle, surrounded by well grown grass, nice bushes, flowers and benches. There are trees only near the road, because under the square there is an underground garage. Half of the circle is enclosed by polyfunctional building.

== Buildings ==
Half of the circle of the St. Francis Square is enclosed by polyfunctional building and therefore people not only live there but can also enjoy coffee, pizza and cocktail places. Important part of the complex is Local Authority Office. The last but not least important part of the St. Francis Square is a Roman Catholic church of St. Francis of Assisi. Attached to it is also a cloister and pastoral center.

== Collapse problem ==
On March 23, 2005 there was a collapse of the underground garage roof and so it caused the most part of the square floor falling in. There is no conclusion about the reason why this collapse happened even after three expertise done since. It is important to mention though that no one was hurt.

== Happenings ==
St. Francis Square became a place where people like to come. Something like the center of the leisure time for almost everyone from Karlova Ves. People come to relax on the benches, or they come with children who can play on the children playground. Many of them prefer fountain though. Also people come there to simply sit and drink their favorite drinks on the sittings outside. Occasionally there is also some entertainment, especially on holidays, and events like concerts and other cultural happenings.

== Church of St. Francis of Assisi ==
Church of St. Francis of Assisi is a Roman Catholic church in Bratislava's borough Karlova Ves on St. Francis Square. It belongs to chaprelry of The Order of Friars Minor Conventual, commonly known as the Conventual Franciscans. It is a branch of the order of Roman Catholic Friars founded by Francis of Assisi in 1209. The capacity of the church is around 250 people. It was sainted on March 9, 2002 by Slovak bishop Ján Sokol
