= Karlova Ves =

- Borough
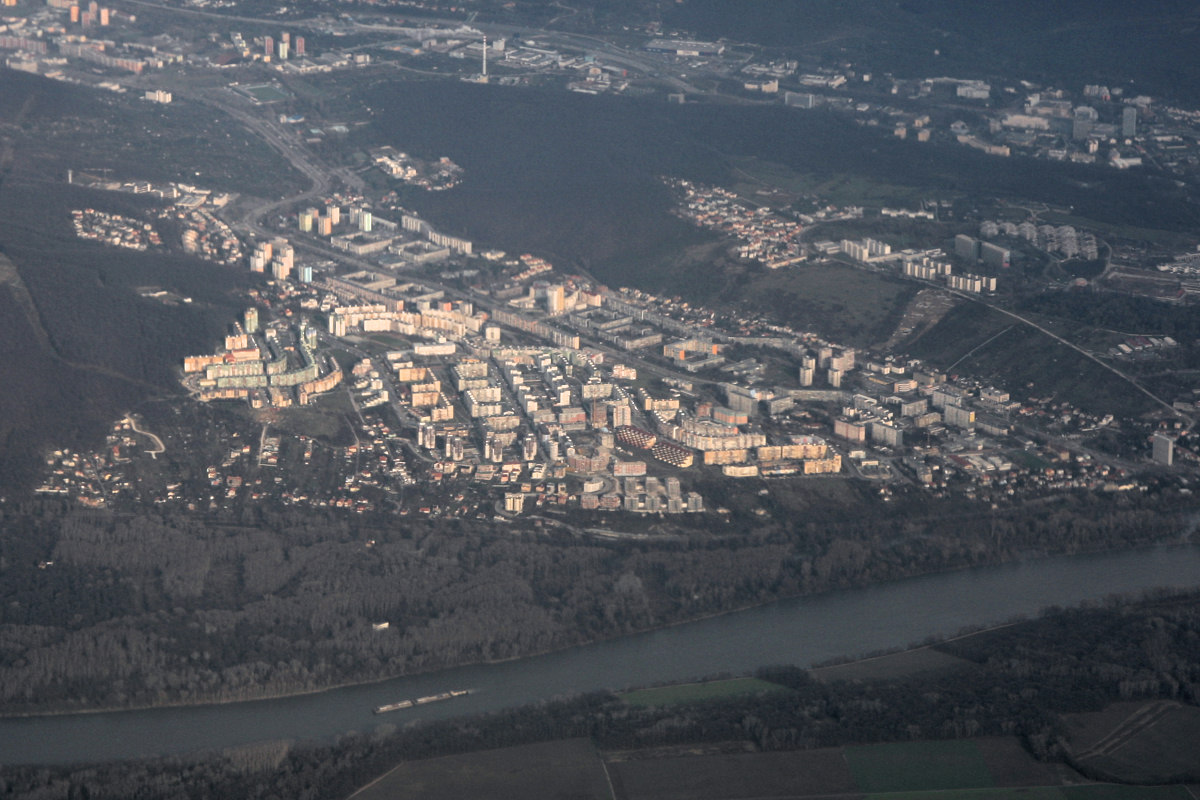

- Flag Coat of arms

- Area of Karlova Ves in Bratislava

- Location of Karlova Ves in Slovakia
- Coordinates: 48°08′00″N 17°07′00″E
- Country: Slovakia
- Region: Bratislava Region
- District: Bratislava IV
- First mentioned: 1786

Government
  - Mayor: Martin Vician

Area
  - Total: 10.94 km^{2} (4.22 sq mi)
- Elevation: 176 m (577 ft)

Population (2025)
  - Total: 34,746
- Time zone: UTC+1 (CET)
  - Summer (DST): UTC+2 (CEST)
- Postal code: 841 04, 841 05
- Area code: +421-2
- Vehicle registration plate (until 2022): BA, BL, BT
- Website: www.karlovaves.sk

Karlova Ves (Hungarian: Károlyújfalu, German: Karlsdorf) is a borough in the city of Bratislava, the capital of Slovakia. It is located in the western part of the city close to the river Danube on the slopes of the Little Carpathians mountains and it is part of the Bratislava IV administrative district. A small, wine-making village for most of its history it was assimilated into Bratislava in the 1940s and in 1957, the construction of a large socialist panelák suburb started. Today, Karlova Ves has approximately 33,000 inhabitants and university dormitories in Mlynská dolina house an additional 15,000 students at the total area of 7874 meters squared.

Karlova Ves consists of three distinct parts: Dlhé diely suburb which houses most of the inhabitants, Mlynská dolina area which features some of the city's central institutions including universities, the Bratislava Zoo and Botanical Garden of the Comenius University. The Karlova Ves proper includes also the largest island in Bratislava; Sihoť. The city part also features the Bratislava Water Museum, the Slávičie údolie cemetery, numerous schools and three Roman-Catholic churches. The St. Francis Square serves as the center of the city borough.

== Location ==
Karlova Ves borders Austria (Wolfsthal, Lower Austria) and Petržalka to the south, Devín to the west, Dúbravka to the north and Old Town to the east. The southern boundary is the river Danube. The original village lied on the western slopes of the Bratislava Foothills, the southernmost part of the Devín Carpathians mountain range, in the valley of the Karloveský stream, on both of its sides. The altitude difference is from 134 meters AMSL at the Karloveská bay to 264 m AMSL at the mountain Nad Sitinou, mean altitude in the borough is 165 meters AMSL.

In the past, the boundaries of Karlova Ves used to change often, stabilizing in their current place after 1971. The southern boundary is the Petržalka bank of the Danube, border with Austria and the Karloveské rameno creating island Sihoť. Eastern boundary is the Cesta na Červený most Street, Lamačská cesta Street, Mlynská dolina street until the river Danube, running underneath the Lafranconi bridge. The northern boundary runs around various industrial buildings until reaching Polianky street, then the gas station at Lamačská cesta Street, then Zelenohorská Street and the northern side of the Bratislava – Malacky railway tracks. The western boundary runs west of Dlhé diely, through the western part of Kuklovská Street, Sološnícka Street, Šaštínska Street, Hrubý vrch, Krčace and finally a forest road at Sitina.

=== Division ===
Karlova Ves is divided into five local parts: Dlhé diely, Mlynská dolina, Kútiky, Rovnice and island Sihoť. Cadastrially it is divided into 9 sectors: Karlova Ves, Dlhé diely, Líščie údolie, Krčace, Patrónka, Mlynská dolina, Sitina – ZOO, Karloveská zátoka (Karlova Ves Bay) and Sihoť.

== History ==
Archaeological finds of stone tools date human settlement of this area to the Lower Paleolithic. A settlement pit containing the ritual burial of a child with an adult's skull dating from the year 5,000 BCE was discovered in the area above the Bratislava Botanical Garden. It is the oldest human remains ever discovered in the Bratislava area.

In the 20th century, Karlova Ves was a small vineyard village in the proximity of Bratislava, and was incorporated into the city in 1943. It includes large, recent high-rise apartment blocks in the Dlhé diely area. In the Mlynská dolina quarter is the headquarters of Slovenská televízia, and there is Slávičie údolie cemetery nearby.

== Population ==
Population statistic (10 years)
Year	1995	2005	2015	2025
Count	31,081	33,559	33,260	34,746
Difference		+7.97%	−0.89%	+4.46%

Population statistic
Year	2024	2025
Count	34,810	34,746
Difference		−0.18%

It has a population of 34,746 people (31 December 2025).

=== Ethnicity ===
Census 2021 (1+%)
Ethnicity	Number	Fraction
Slovak	31,240	87.64%
Not found out	2941	8.25%
Hungarian	799	2.24%
Czech	686	1.92%
Other	414	1.16%
Total	35,644	

In year 2021 was 35,644 people by ethnicity 31,240 as Slovak, 2941 as Not found out, 799 as Hungarian, 686 as Czech, 414 as Other, 184 as Rusyn, 157 as Russian, 148 as German, 137 as Ukrainian, 54 as Bulgarian, 51 as Polish, 50 as Serbian, 49 as Italian, 49 as Romani, 33 as Jewish, 33 as Moravian, 33 as French, 29 as Romanian, 29 as Croatian, 28 as Chinese, 26 as Austrian, 23 as Albanian, 18 as Turkish, 12 as Korean, 9 as Greek, 6 as Irish, 6 as Canadian, 5 as Iranian, 3 as Vietnamese, 3 as Silesian and 3 as English.

Note on population: The difference values of population numbers in the table "Population statistic" and in the sections "Ethnicity" & "Religion" is caused by the use of various statistical methods.

=== Religion ===
Census 2021 (1+%)
Religion	Number	Fraction
None	15,837	44.43%
Roman Catholic Church	13,241	37.15%
Not found out	2956	8.29%
Evangelical Church	1621	4.55%
Total	35,644	

In year 2021 was 35,644 people by religion 15,837 from None, 13,241 from Roman Catholic Church, 2956 from Not found out, 1621 from Evangelical Church, 352 from Greek Catholic Church, 246 from Eastern Orthodox Church, 246 from Ad hoc movements, 232 from Other, 145 from Other and not ascertained christian church, 115 from Calvinist Church, 102 from Buddhism, 86 from Christian Congregations in Slovakia, 77 from Islam, 75 from Jehovah's Witnesses, 60 from Church of the Brethren, 49 from Jewish community, 48 from Apostolic Church, 35 from Paganism and natural spirituality, 27 from Baptists Church, 22 from Seventh-day Adventist Church, 21 from Old Catholic Church, 20 from United Methodist Church, 17 from Hinduism, 8 from Czechoslovak Hussite Church, 4 from Church of Jesus Christ of Latter-day Saints and 2 from Bahá'i Community.

== Politics ==
List of mayors of Karlova Ves and political parties that nominated them:

- 1991 – 1994 – Jozef Krištúfek
- 1994 – 1998 – Bystrík Hollý (KDH, NDS, DÚ, SPŽ SR)
- 1998 – 2002 – Bystrík Hollý (KDH, DÚ, DS, SDSS, SZS)
- 2002 – 2006 – Bystrík Hollý (DS, DÚ, KDH, SZS), other sources claim (SDKÚ-DS, KDH)
- 2006 – 2010 – Iveta Hanulíková (SMER, HZDS, SNS)
- 2010 – 2014 – Iveta Hanulíková (SMER)
- 2014 – 2022 – Dana Čahojová (independent)

== Religion ==
Catholic churches in Karlova Ves

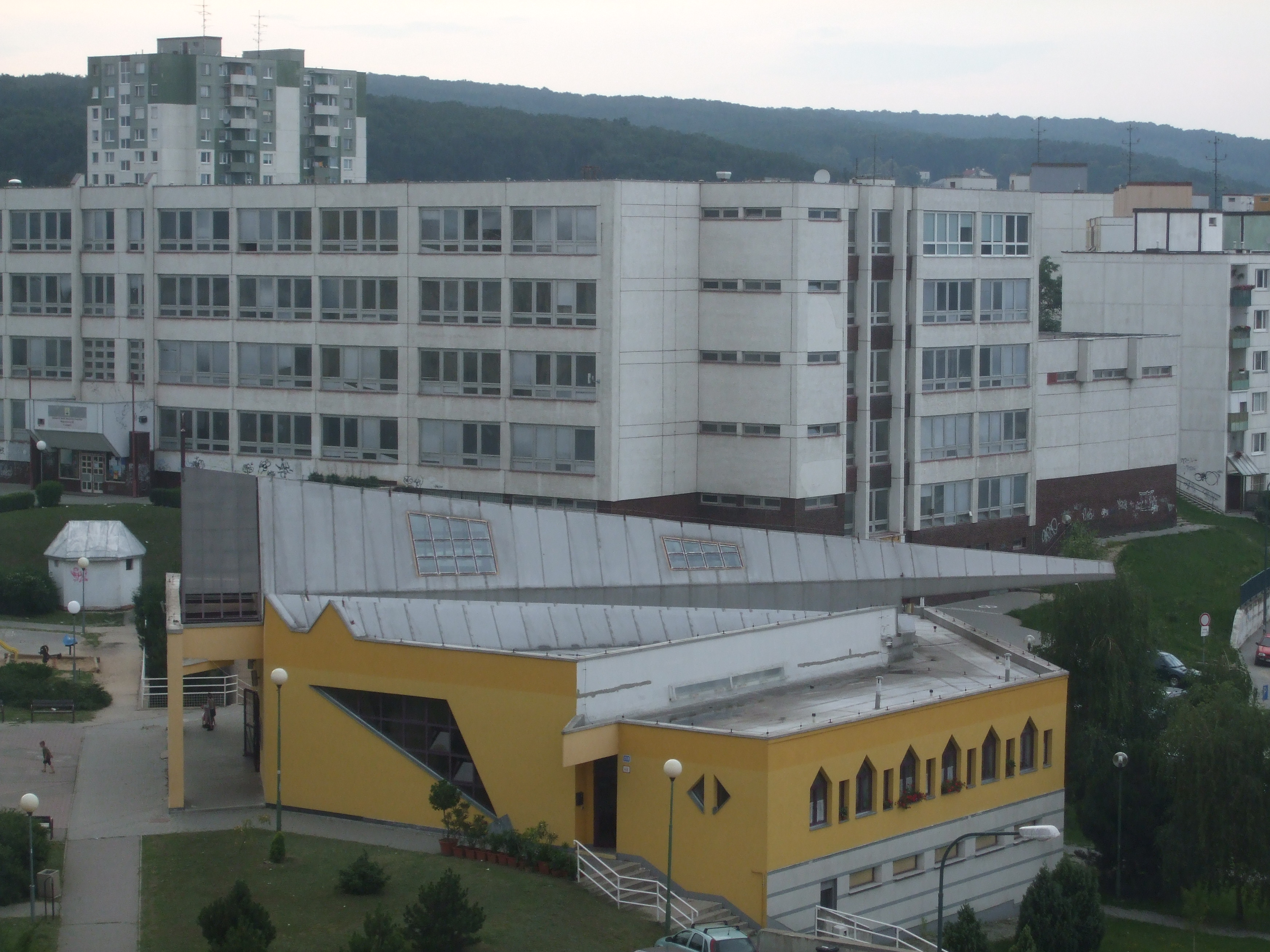
Church of the Nativity of Mary

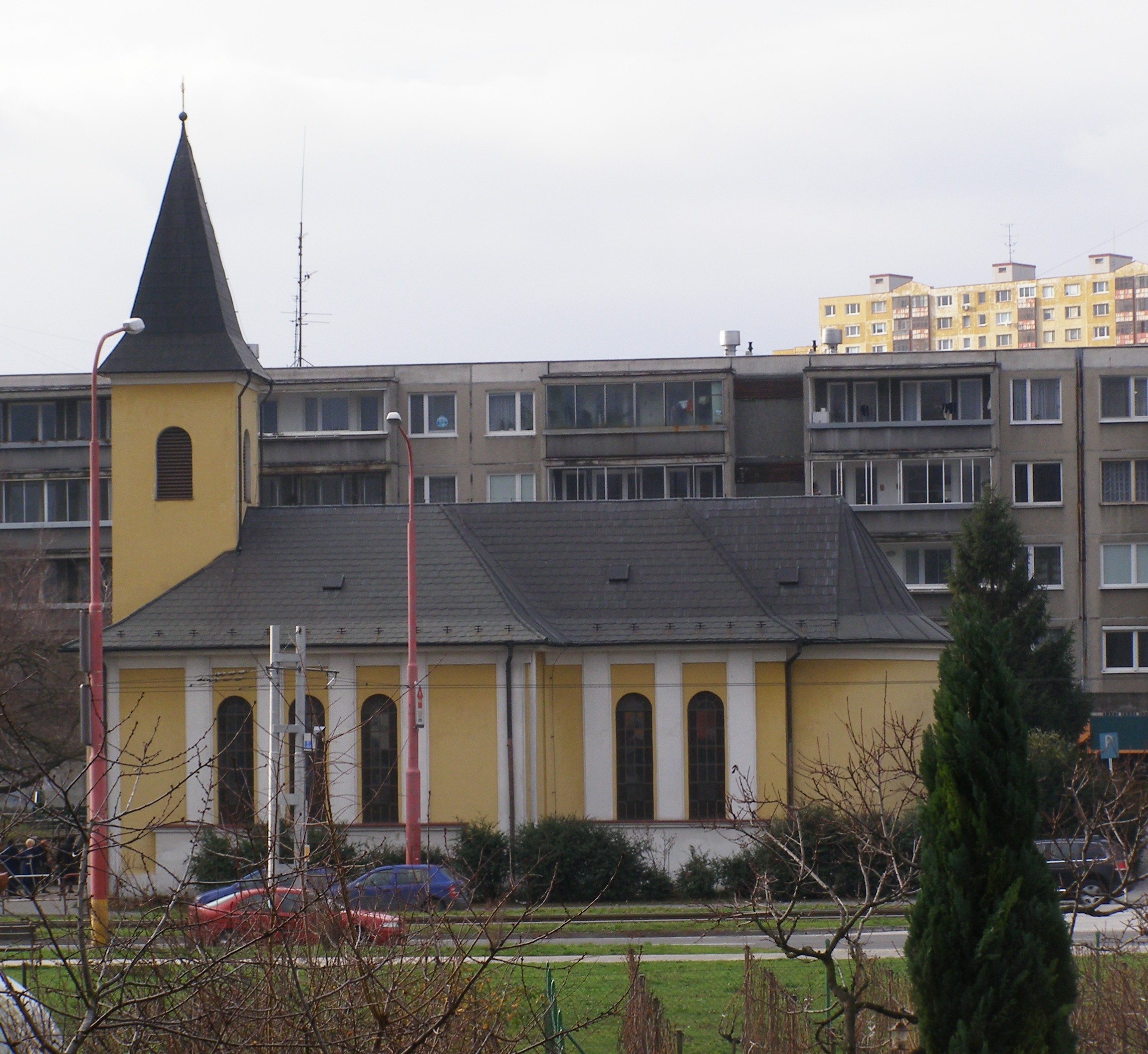
Church of Saint Michael Archangel

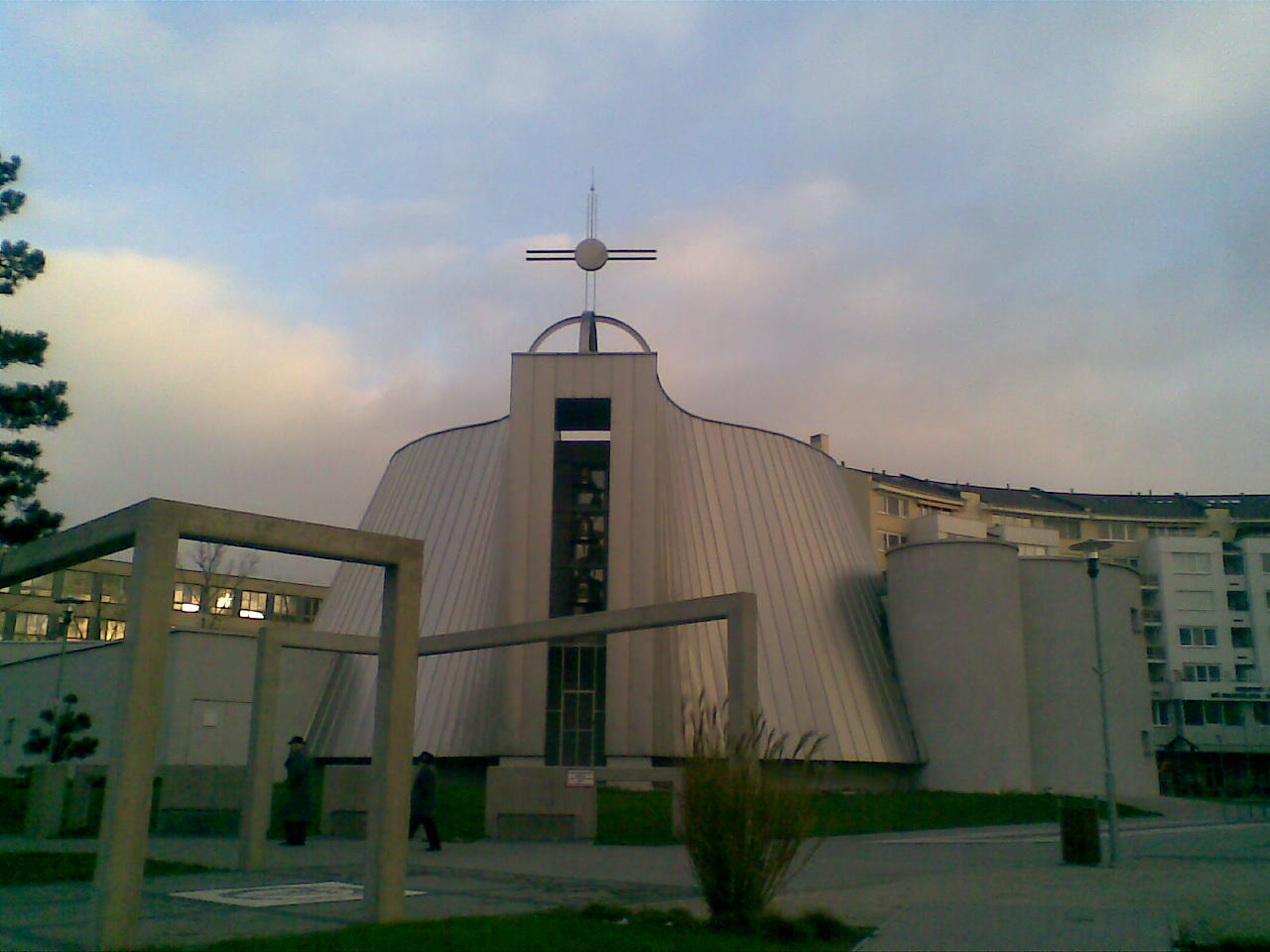
Church of Saint Francis of Assisi

Karlova Ves features three Roman-Catholic churches:

- Church of the Nativity of Mary (Slovak: Kostol Narodenia Panny Márie) – consecrated in 1995
- Church of Saint Michael Archangel (Slovak: Kostol svätého Michala Archanjela) – built in the 18th century, consecrated in 1935
- Church of Saint Francis of Assisi (Slovak: Kostol svätého Františka z Assisi) – consecrated in 2002

== Education ==
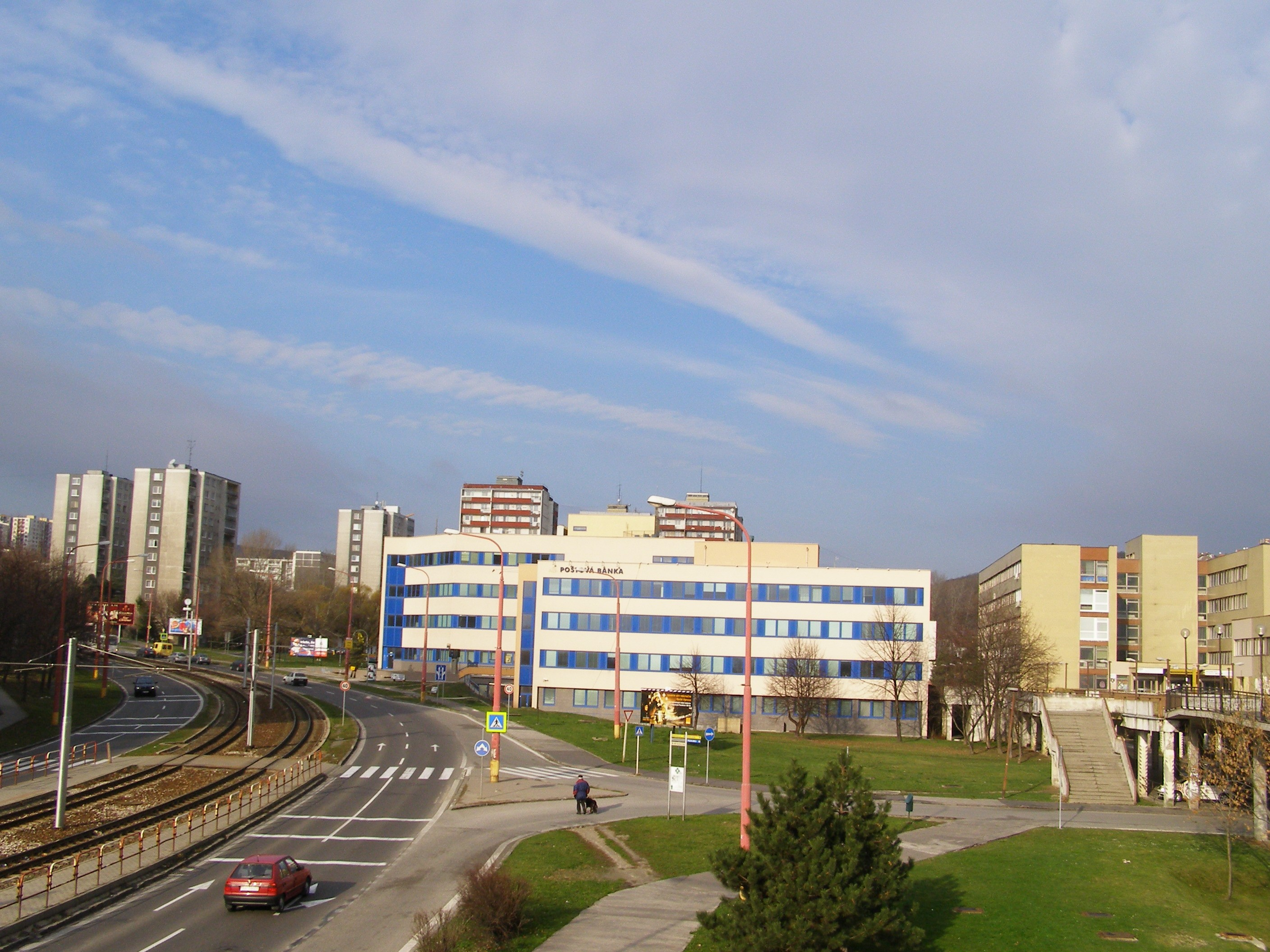
Post office and hospital in Karlova Ves

Karlova Ves features 5 high-schools, 4 elementary schools and 11 kindergartens. Mlynská dolina, part of Karlova Ves, features numerous universities and university dormitories.

- High-school equivalent: Gymnázium Ladislava Sáru 1, Škola úžitkového výtvarníctva Josefa Vydru Dúbravská cesta 11, Spojená škola s organizačnými zloţkami: ZŠ a gymnázium Tilgnerova 14, Spojená škola sv. Františka z Assisi s organizačnými zložkami: ZŠ sv. Františka z Assisi a gymnázium sv. Františka z Assisi, Súkromné gymnázium ESPRIT Majerníkova 62
- Elementary schools: ZŠ Karloveská 61, ZŠ Alexandra Dubčeka Majerníkova 62
- Kindergartens: MŠ Adámiho 11, MŠ Borská 4, MŠ Kolískova 14, MŠ Ladislava Sáru 3, MŠ Ľudovíta Fullu 12, MŠ Majerníkova 11, MŠ Majerníkova 60, MŠ Pod Rovnicami 1, MŠ Suchohradská 3, ŠMŠ Svrčia 3 (special needs), SŠ Mokrohájska 3 (special needs)

== Sports ==
The main sporting club in Karlova Ves is Karloveský športový klub. There are three multi-functional playgrounds available for free to the public: inside the area of School Alexandra Dubčeka, School Karloveská 32 and School Veternicová 20.

== Notable people ==
- Libor Ebringer, Professor of microbiology and Doctor of Sciences

== See also ==
- Boroughs and localities of Bratislava
- Geography of Bratislava
