= Mlynská dolina =

Coordinates: 48°12′N 17°06′E

- Neighbourhood of Bratislava
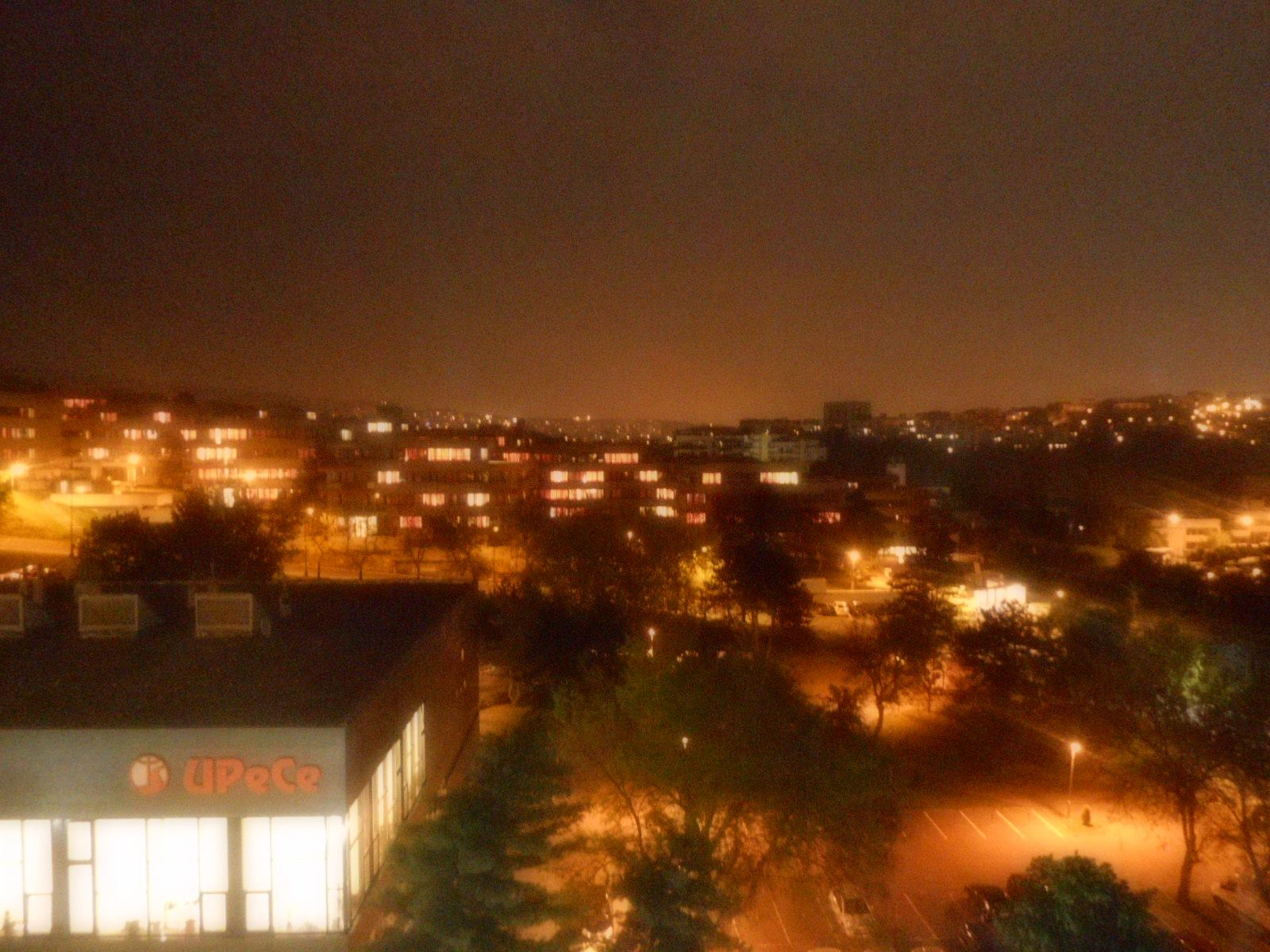
- University campus at Mlynská dolina in the night
- Interactive map of Mlynská dolina
- Country: Slovakia
- Region: Bratislava Region
- City: Bratislava
- Borough: Karlova Ves
- Postal code (PSČ): 811 02, 811 04, 841 04
- Telephone area code: (+421) 2

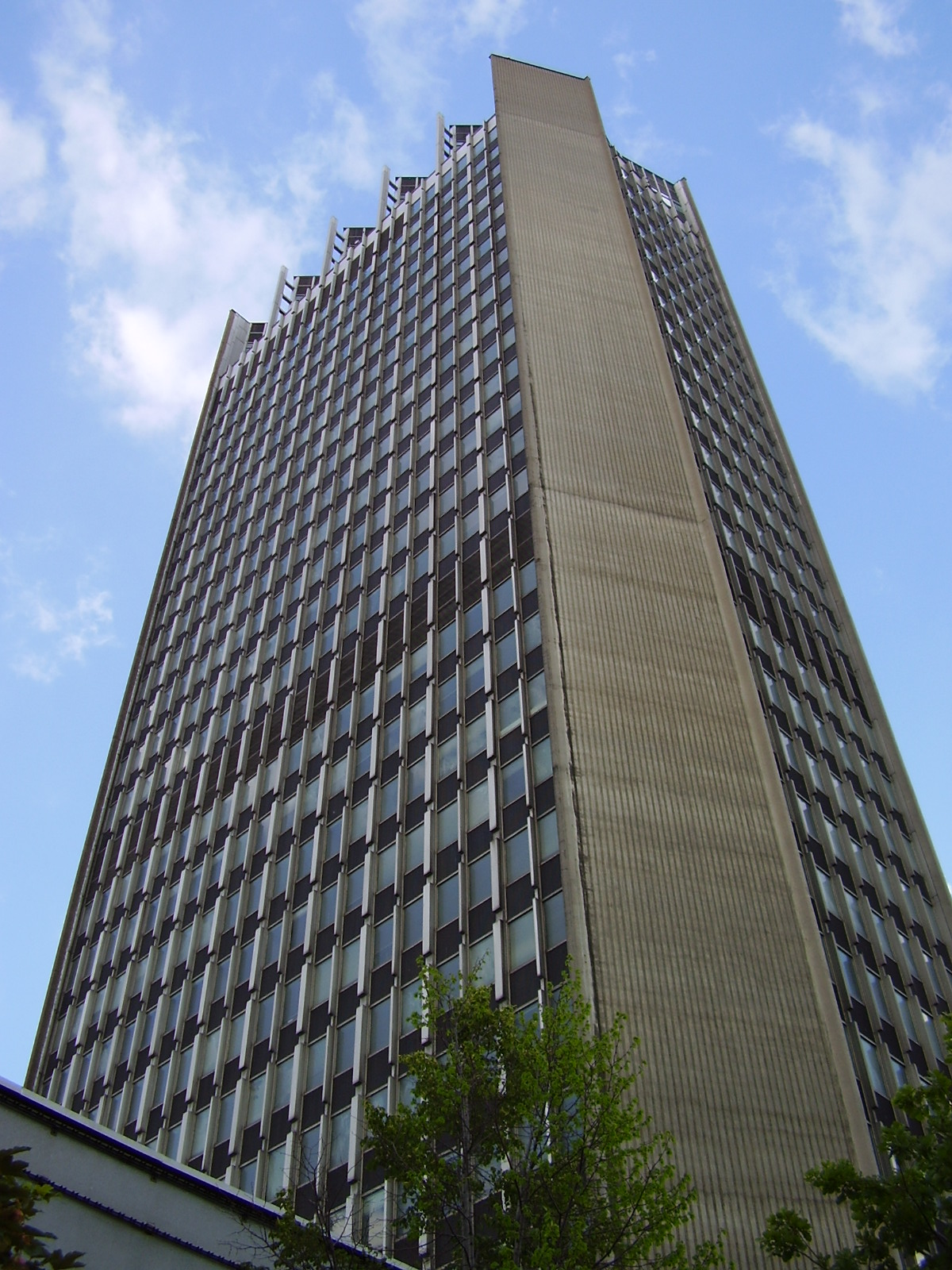
Headquarters of Slovak Television at Mlynská dolina

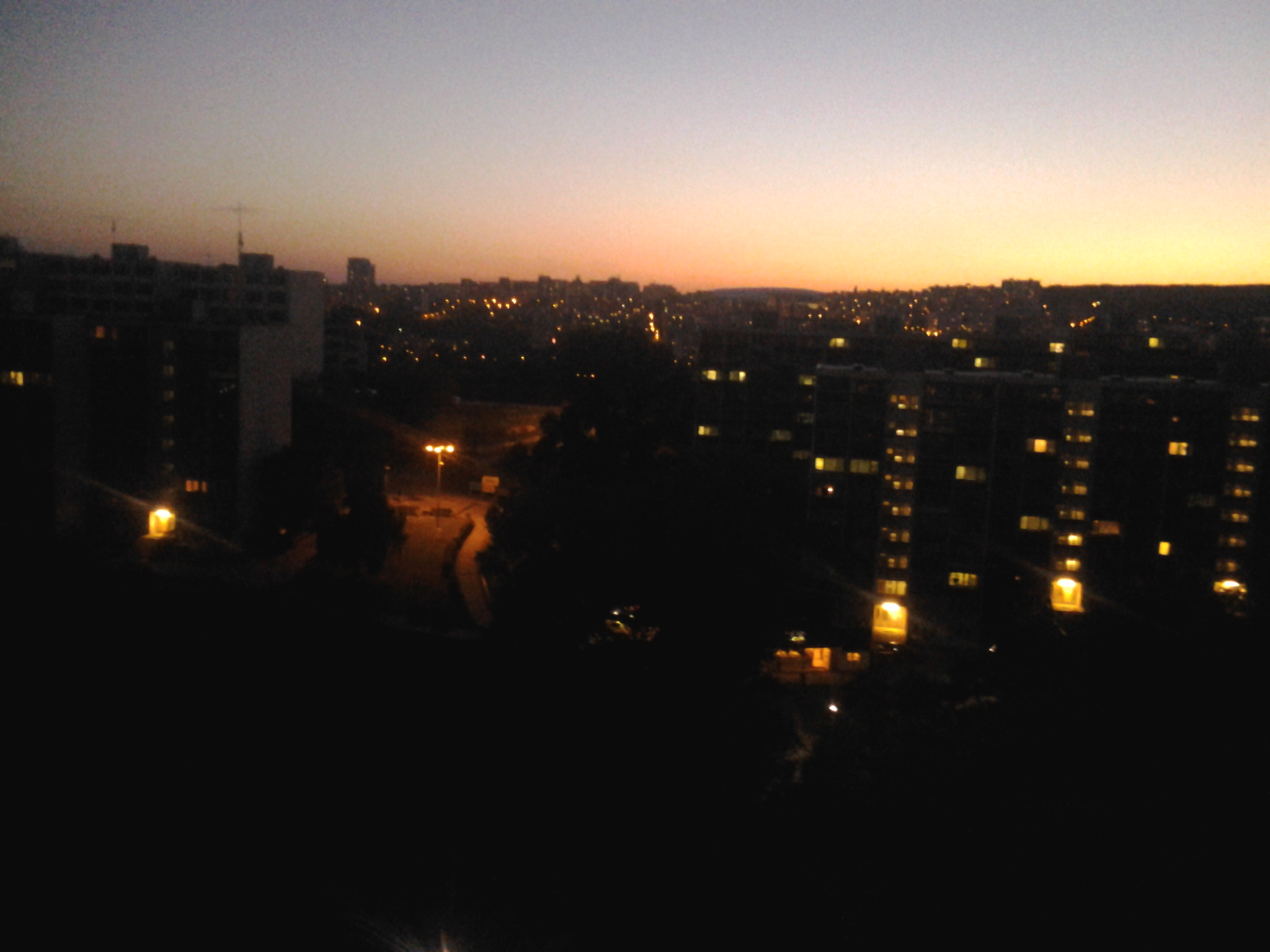
Mlynská Dolina at night

Mlynská dolina (literally: Mill valley; before 1894 German: Mühltal, Hungarian: Malomvölgy) is a neighborhood of Karlova Ves borough of Bratislava, the capital of Slovakia. It is located in the Bratislava IV district. Geographically and historically it constitutes a much larger area of the entire valley of the river Vydrica, including its upper part located in the Little Carpathians mountains and the area of Patrónka.

In the present, Mlynská dolina features two faculties of the Slovak University of Technology in Bratislava, the Faculty of Electrical Engineering and Informatics and the Faculty of Informatics and Information Technologies and university dormitories housing up to 15,000 students, the largest of its kind in Slovakia. The area features the Bratislava Zoo, headquarters of the former Slovak Television housed in one of the tallest buildings in the city, the Botanical Garden of the Comenius University, one of the largest cemeteries in Bratislava, Slávičie údolie and many upscale residential areas. Mlynská dolina is served by the D2 motorway.

== Places and student organizations at Mlynská dolina dormitory complex ==
Mlynská Dolina is called „a student town“ because nearly anything needed for everyday life can be found at one place, including grocery stores, restaurants, clubs, sport fields and sport centers, a medical clinic or several student organizations' meeting places. Few companies have their local offices at Mlynská Dolina dormitory complex. Several times a year Mlynská Dolina hosts a local festival (e.g. Amos Fest) or a concert.

Mlynská Dolina dormitory complex is a place where several student organizations have their local offices: Integrity Life, z.ú. (Czech and Slovak student organization), UPC MOSTY (Lutheran University Pastoral Centre), UPeCe (Catholic University Pastoral Centre), UKC (University Cultural Centre), RUŠ (Mladosť Dormitory Students' Association), etc.

== See also ==
- Boroughs and localities of Bratislava
- Geography of Bratislava
