= Dlhé diely =

Coordinates: 48°09′06″N 17°02′59″E

- Neighborhood of Bratislava
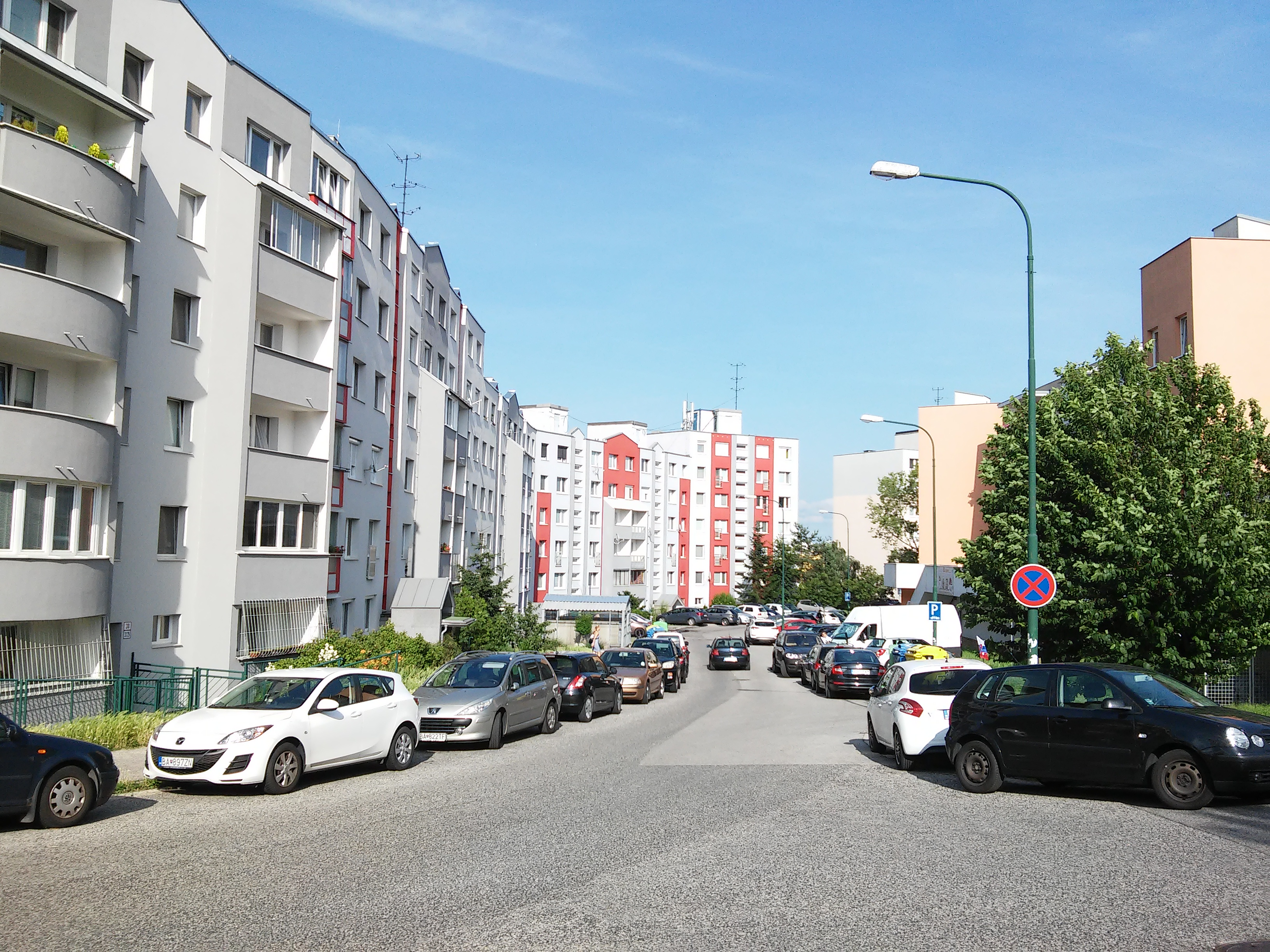
- L'udovíta Fullu Street in Dlhé diely
- Interactive map of Dlhé diely
- Country: Slovakia
- Region: Bratislava Region
- City: Bratislava
- Borough: Karlova Ves

Population (2007)
  - Total: 25,000 - 30,000
- Postal code (PSČ): 841 04
- Telephone area code: (+421) 2

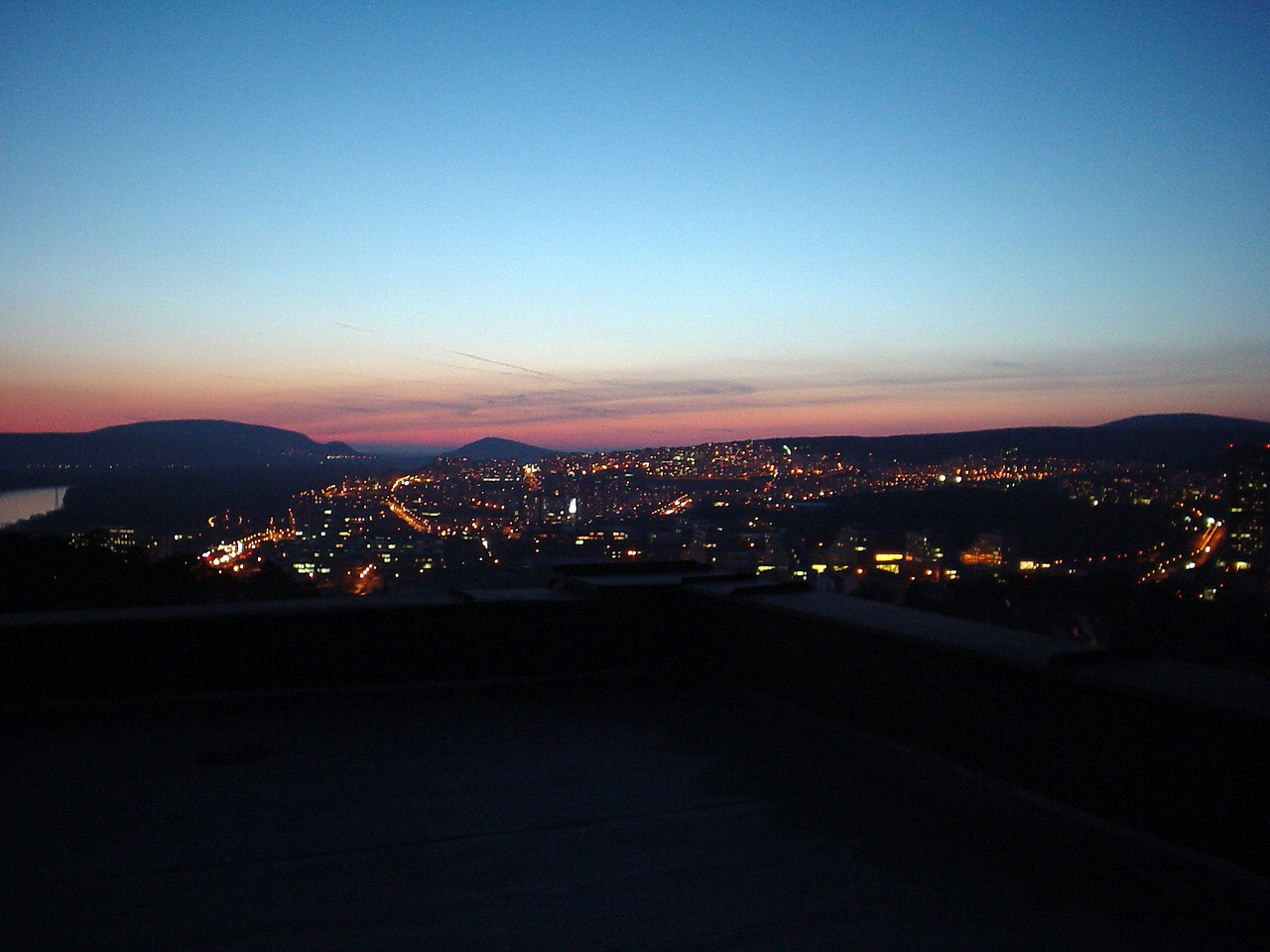
Dlhé diely at night

Dlhé diely is a neighborhood of Bratislava, the capital of Slovakia, part of the Karlova Ves borough in the Bratislava IV district. It is one of the newest residential quarters of the city. It is situated at the foothills of the Little Carpathians overlooking the river Danube, offering extensive views over Bratislava and Austria. Buildings in this part of the city are almost exclusively blocks of flats, most of them relatively new. Formerly consisting of vineyards, woods and meadows next to Karlova Ves proper, a residential area planned for 12,000 people emerged in the 1980s and 1990s. Today, Dlhé diely houses around 30,000 inhabitants.

== History ==
The territory was previously a park/wood near Karlova Ves proper. The park was known as Langetheile before 1950 and as Dlhý diel from 1950 to 1976; both Langetheile (German) and Dlhé diely (Slovak) literally mean "long parts" or "long divisions".

The southern slopes of Dlhé diely were inhabited from the Paleolithic age, as evidenced by archaeological finds of tools.

Dlhé diely is one of the more attractive quarters in Bratislava for housing, though congestion and traffic have been problematic because of the large number of people living there, including around 15,000 students.

== Gallery ==
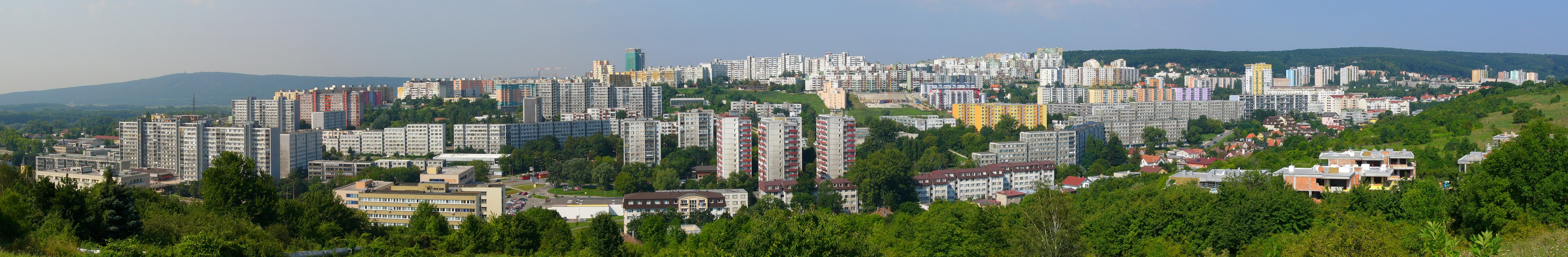
Panorama of Dlhé diely

== See also ==
- Karlova Ves
- History of Bratislava
