= Fraňo Kráľ =

Slovak poet and politician

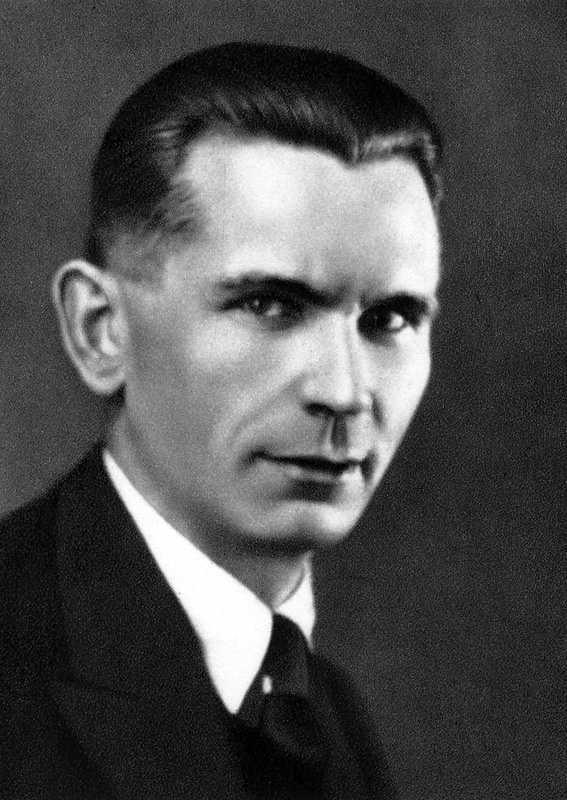
- Born: 9 March 1903; Ohio, United States
- Died: 3 January 1955 (aged 51); Bratislava, Czechoslovakia
- Resting place: Slávičie údolie cemetery
- Occupations: Poet, novelist, politician
- Writing career
- Notable awards: National Artist
- Movement: Socialist realism

Fraňo Kráľ (9 March 1903 – 3 January 1955) was a Slovak poet, novelist and politician who was a leading representative of Socialist realist literature in Czechoslovakia.

== Biography ==
He was born in Ohio, United States, in the family of Slovak immigrants. At the age of two, he returned to Slovakia with his mother in the city of Smrečany, while the family's financial situation was very poor. After receiving his primary education, Kráľ started to work as a teacher after his graduation from the pedagogical school in Spišská Nová Ves.

During his studies, due to his poor diet, he contracted typhus, which left permanent traces in his body, and later lung disease was a direct consequence of it. He enlisted in the military, but soon contracted tuberculosis. He was treated in Tatranské Matliary. He later moved to the Czech sanatorium Prosečnice. Not yet properly treated, he was released from the sanatorium and began working as a teacher in Okoličné, later he was transferred to the small village of Kováčovce in the district of Modrý Kameň and other places. In 1921, he became a member of the Communist Party of Czechoslovakia.

In 1931 he came to Bratislava for work, but due to his communist convictions he was fired and forced to retire. During the period of the fascist Slovak State, he was a member underground resistance.

After the Second World War and liberation, he worked at the Commission of Education, was a member of the Central Committee of the Communist Party, a member of the Slovak National Council and a member of the presidency of the Union of Czechoslovak Writers.

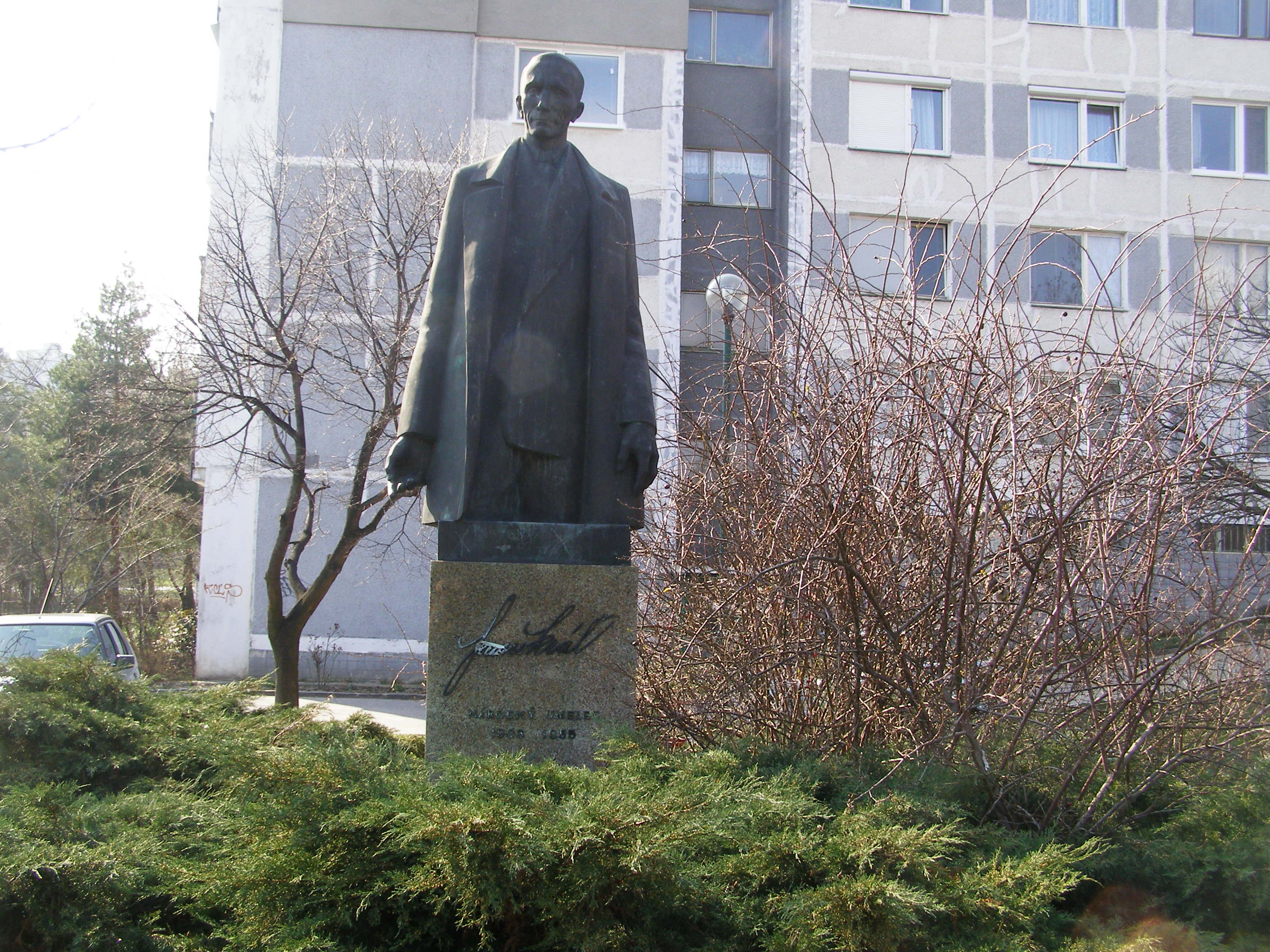
Monument of Fraňo Kráľ in Bratislava

In 1953, Kráľ received the title of National Artist.

== Works ==
The beginning of the literary activity started in the period of his treatment in hospitals and sanatoriums in Slovakia, when he published his first poems, some of which were published in publications such as Pravda and Nový život.

Initially, he created his works under the influence of proletarian poetry, later poetism and symbolism. In his novels, he depicted the socio-political situation in Slovakia between the two world wars, the horrors and sufferings of the war. His writing style became close to socialist realism, in which there was an anti-religious and later anti-fascist tendency and an exaltation of Marxist ideology.

In addition to prose, novels and poetry, Král has written children's books as well, works which have become an integral part of Slovak literature for children and have been translated into numerous foreign languages.

=== Poetry ===
- 1930 – Čerň na palete ("Black on the palette"), collection of poems;
- 1931 – Balt ("Baltic"), collection of poems;
- 1936 – Pohľadnice ("Illustrated postcards"), collection of poems;
- 1945 – Z Noci do úsvitu ("From night to dawn"), collection of poems;
- 1952 – Jarnou cestou ("On the road to spring"), collection of poems.

=== Prose ===
- 1934 – Cesta zarúbaná ("The cut road"), novel;
- 1945 – Stretnutie ("Encounter"), novel (written in 1937 );
- 1949 – Za krajší život ("For a more beautiful life"), commemorative novel;
- 1952 – Bude ako nebolo ("It will be as it was not"), novel.

=== Children's literature ===
- 1931 – Jano, autobiographical prose;
- 1932 – Čenkovej deti.

=== Other ===
- 1946 – Keď sa časy menia ("When times change"), drama;
- 1961 – Fraňo Kráľ učiteľom ("Fraňo Kráľ teacher"), collection of speeches, articles, documents.
