= Sihoť =

Coordinates: 48.1467°N 17.0408°E

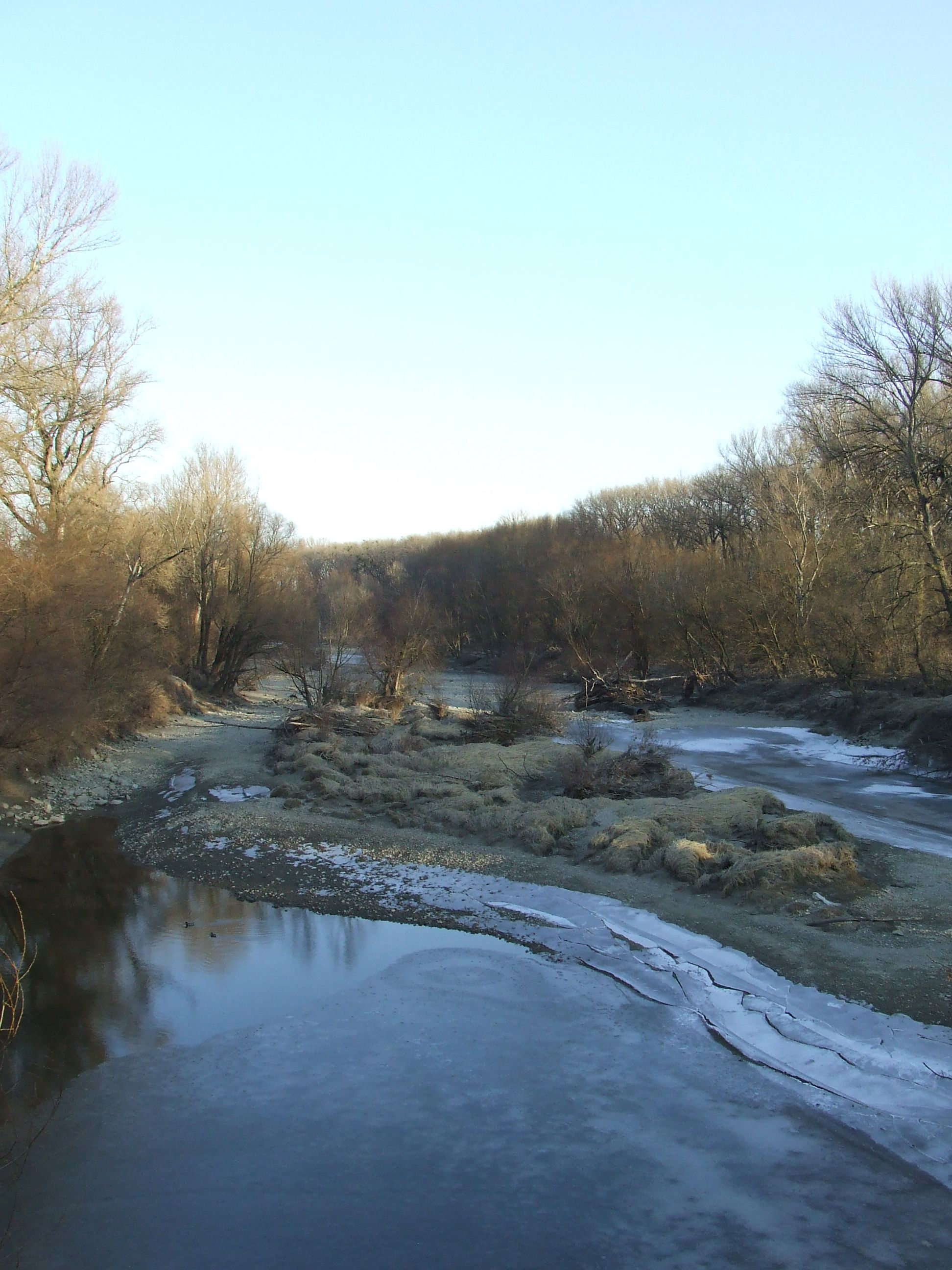
- Interactive map of Sihoť

Geography
- Location: Bratislava, Slovakia
- Area: 2.35 km^{2} (0.91 sq mi)

Administration
- Slovakia
- Region: Bratislava Region
- City: Bratislava
- Borough: Karlova Ves

Demographics
- Population: 0 (2012)

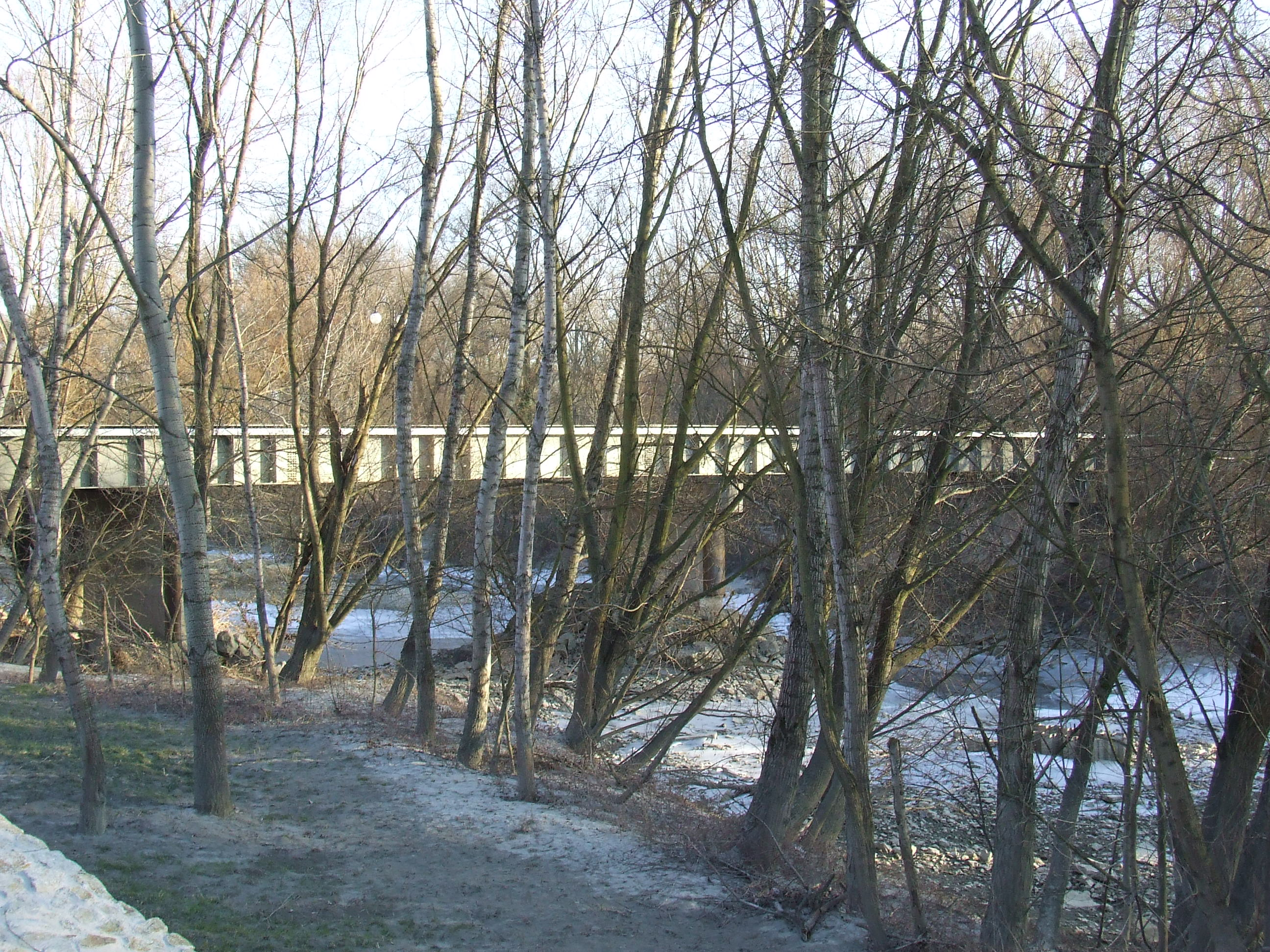
The only access point to the island is this bridge

Sihoť is the largest river island on the Danube in Bratislava, the capital of Slovakia, located in the district of Karlova Ves. The island lies between the main flow of the Danube to the north and the parallel channel Karloveské rameno to the south, between Devínska cesta in Bratislava and the Austrian border. It contains a culturally protected water source supplying tap water to a large portion of Bratislava citizens, as well as numerous nearby villages.

Under communism, access to the island was restricted due to its proximity to the Austrian border and the only access bridge to the island was guarded by soldiers. Access to the island remained forbidden even after the end of communism and today, access is highly restricted. Since 15 May 2012, the island is a protected area and there is currently an initiative to declare the island a national park and connect it with the neighboring Danube-Auen National Park in Austria.

== History ==
In the past, Sihoť was called "Käsmacherinsel" in German and "Syrársky ostrov" in Slovak. The name is derived from the dwellings of peasants who processed milk. It was the largest Danube island in all of the Kingdom of Hungary.

The area was inspected by Bernhard Salbach from Dresden in 1881–1882 and the island was found to be a good water source. Salbach also designed the system supplying drinking water to the historical center of the city, which remains operational until today. Bratislava established its first waterworks in the 1880s, becoming one of the first cities in Europe to build a water supply system. The first pilot well was dug on Sihoť island in 1882 and it is preserved as a historical monument until today. After the properties of the water were confirmed to be sound, construction work was ceremonially launched. Besides the well, the first facilities of the waterworks included a pumping station at Karlova Ves and a reservoir at Somársky vrch. A regular supply of high-quality drinking water has been provided ever since. The main waterworks were built in 1885.

== Description ==
The 235 hectare-area of the island belongs to the company Štátne Lesy, which is conducting timber harvesting on the island despite the area being protected. All water wells, water supply infrastructure and all buildings and roads on the island belong to the Bratislava Water Company.

The island is part of the hunting ground Devínska Kobyla which is casually used by the hunters for the last 60 years, despite the area being protected. In 2007, the head of Štátne Lesy Jozef Minďáš signed a contract with hunting organization Klenovica giving it the right to hunt on the island for 10 years for the fee of 440 euro per year. Animals being hunted on the island include wild boar, red deer and ducks.

== Flora and fauna ==
Most of the island is forested with the remnants of the primeval riparian forest that is partially flooded during high water levels on the Danube each year and during extreme events, most of the island becomes submerged.

At least since 1886, public access to the island was largely prohibited due to the protection of the drinking water supply system. Due to low human activity, wildlife is abundant on the island. Sihoť features a variety of protected plants including Snowdrops, Lily of the Valley and Lesser celandine. The ecosystem is largely intact, save for some limited legal logging.

Animals include: beavers, wild boar, red deer and ducks.

== See also ==
- Geography of Bratislava
- List of islands of Slovakia
- History of Bratislava
- Tourism in Slovakia
