= Slávičie údolie cemetery =

Cemetery in Bratislava, Slovakia

Coordinates: 48°09′23″N 17°04′05″E

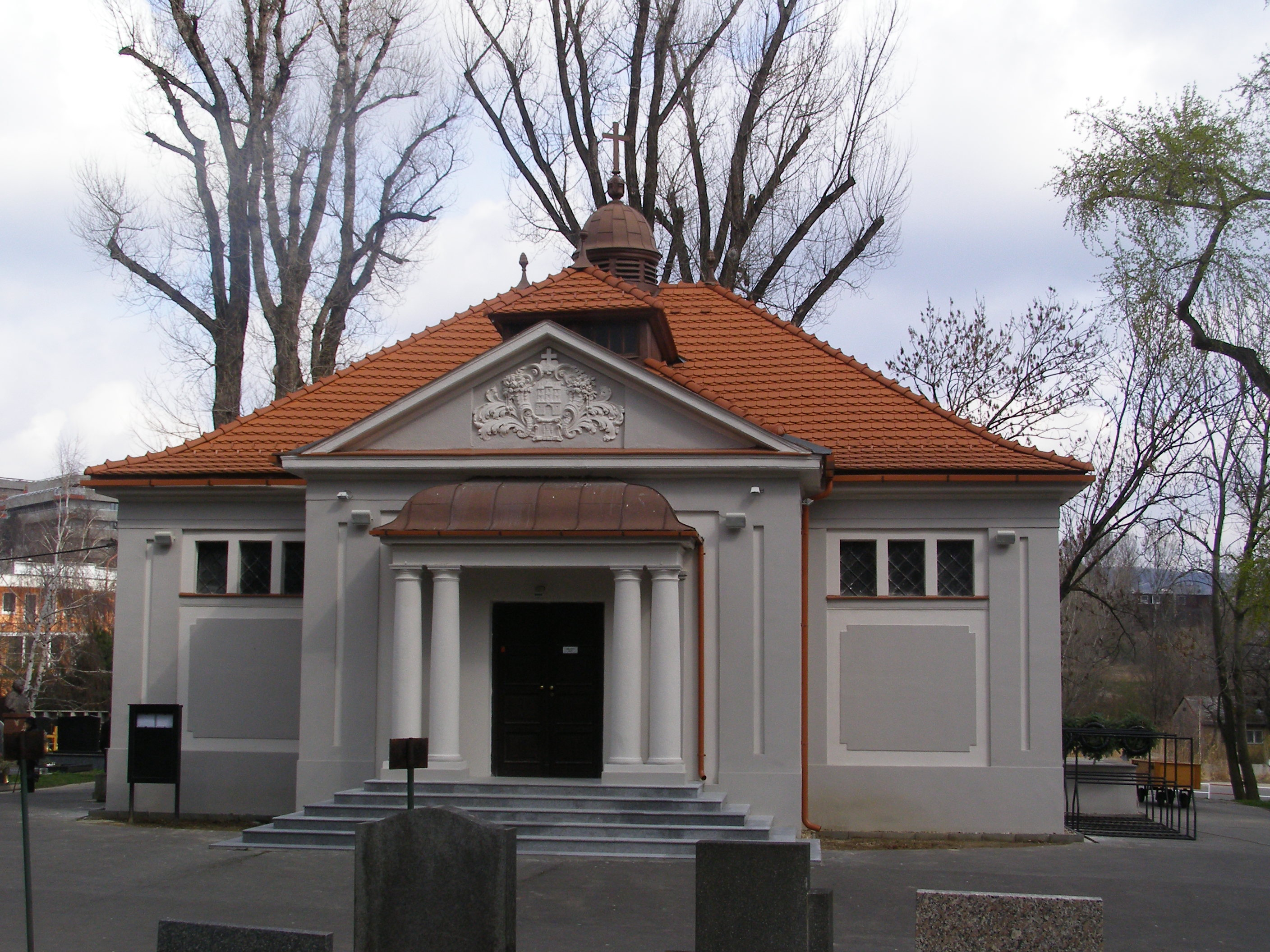
A house in Slávičie údolie cemetery

Slávičie údolie cemetery (Slovak: Cintorín Slávičie údolie, literally "Nightingale Valley") is a cemetery in the Karlova Ves borough in Bratislava, Slovakia. It covers 18.5 ha (46 acres) and is the largest cemetery in Bratislava.

The cemetery was built in 1912 for poorer inhabitants of Bratislava, and it was called "cemetery of the poor". In World War I soldiers were buried there. Today it is the final resting place for prominent Slovak artists, scientists, soldiers, airmen and politicians.

== Notable interments ==
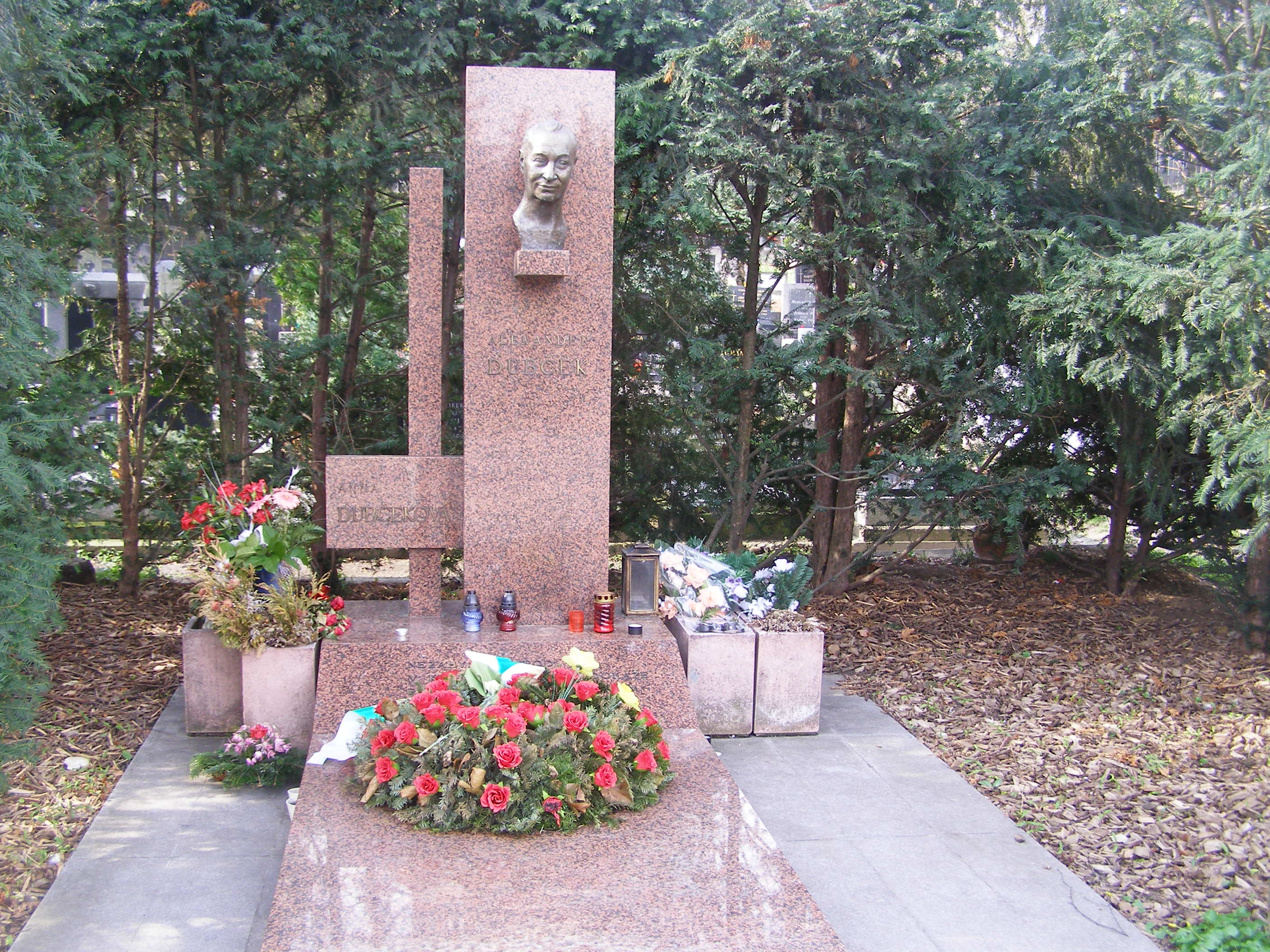
Grave of Alexander Dubček

- Janko Alexy
- Ján Ambruš
- Janko Borodáč
- Ivan Bukovčan
- Ján Cikker
- Alexander Dubček
- Vladimír Dzurilla
- Vladimír Fajnor
- Margita Figuli
- Tibor Freso
- Koloman Gögh
- Gustáv Husák
- Vincent Hložník
- Mikuláš Huba
- Terézia Hurbanová-Kronerová
- Viera Husáková
- Ondrej Jariabek
- Mária Kišonová-Hubová
- Ján Kostra
- Fraňo Kráľ
- Ivan Kraskovsky
- Jozef Kroner
- Ján Langoš
- Emil Boleslav Lukáč
- Gejza Medrický
- Vojtech Mihálik
- Vladimír Mináč
- Ján Čajak mladší
- Ondrej Nepela
- Mirko Nešpor
- Ľudo Ondrejov
- Ján Ondruš
- Dušan Pašek
- Andrej Plávka
- Lucia Popp
- Otto Smik
- Leopold Stastny
- Alexander Trizuljak
- Ľudo Zelienka
