= Bratislava Zoo =

Zoo in Slovakia

Bratislava Zoo Zoologická záhrada Bratislava
- Bratislava Zoo logo

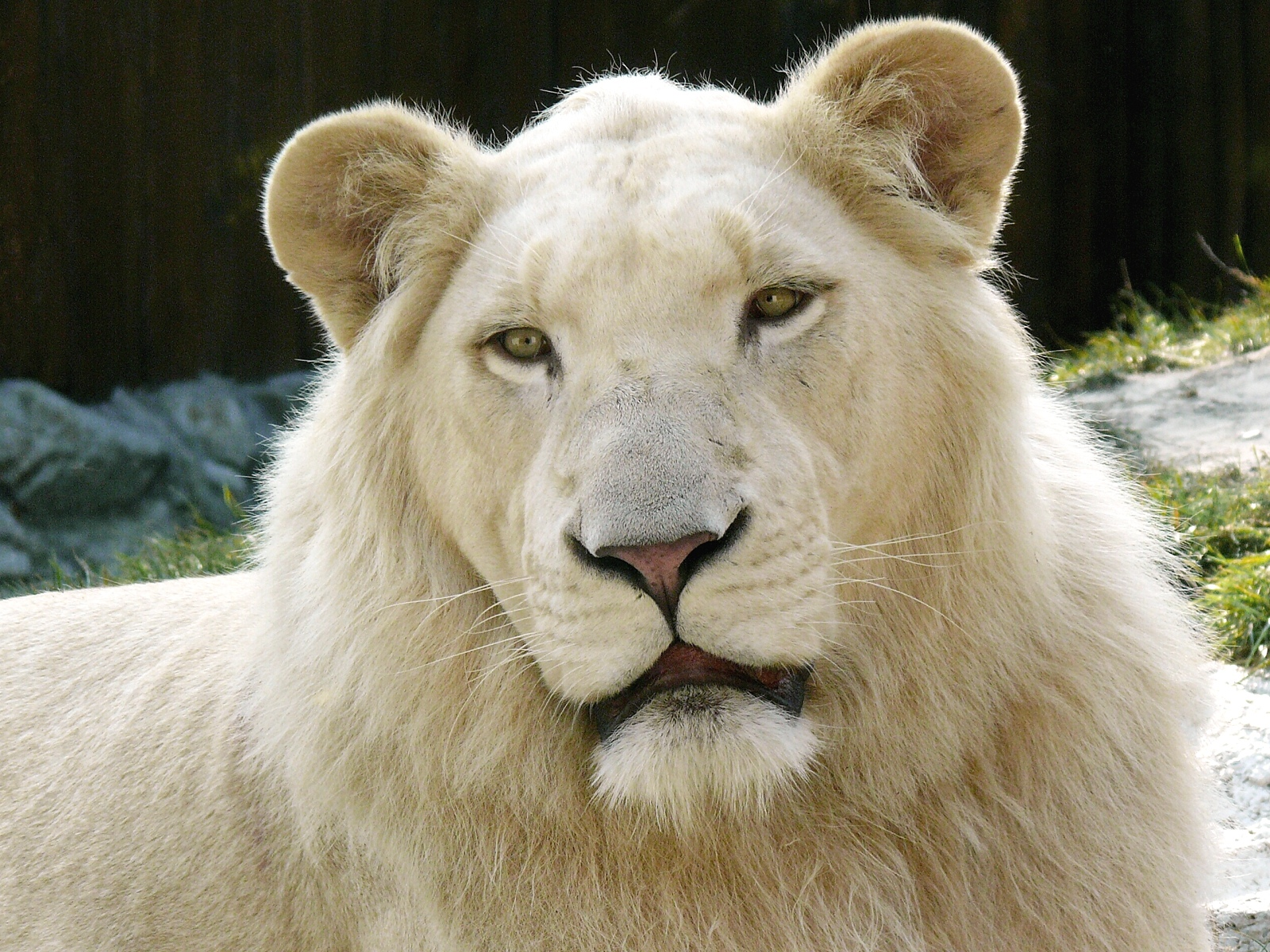
- White lion at the Bratislava Zoo
- Interactive map of Bratislava Zoo; Zoologická záhrada Bratislava
- 48°09′44″N 17°04′28″E
- Date opened: 9 May 1960; 66 years ago
- Location: Bratislava, Slovakia
- Land area: 96 ha (240 acres)
- No. of animals: 1154 (2020)
- No. of species: 169 (2020)
- Annual visitors: 252,565 (2020)
- Memberships: EAZA, UCSZOO, IZE, Species360, EARAZA
- Website: www.zoobratislava.sk

The Bratislava Zoo (Slovak: Zoologická záhrada Bratislava) is a zoo in Bratislava, Slovakia. It is located in the area of Mlynská dolina in the borough Karlova Ves. Opened in 1960, it is the second oldest zoo in Slovakia. The zoo covers an area of 96 hectares (240 acres), out of which 35 hectares (86 acres) is open to the public. The zoo receives on average around 300,000 visitors annually.

As of 2026, it is home to over 1258 specimens of 184 animal species and is open every day of the year. Major attractions include white lions, sumatran orangutans, european bisons and rothschild's giraffes. Zoo Bratislava was one of the first zoos in Europe that was successful in breeding Eurasian lynx and striped hyena in captivity.

== Description ==
The Bratislava Zoo is an independent organization of the city of Bratislava (Slovak: Príspevková organizácia Hlavného mesta SR Bratislavy). It focuses on the breeding and conservation of endangered animal species, scientific and research work, education of the public, and providing recreational facilities in the city. It offers educational programs for children and students and allows the public to symbolically adopt an animal from the zoo for a fee.

The zoo is located on a hilly and partially forested terrain on the slopes of the forested hills of Little Carpathians. The river Vydrica flows through the area. Despite a noise barrier the zoo struggles with noise pollution from the nearby D2 motorway.

The managing director since 2023 has been Matej Dobšovič.

Notable exhibits:

- Breeding facility for South African lions, jaguars and Sri Lankan leopards
- Primate House for common chimpanzee and Sumatran orangutan
- Terrarium and exhibit of exotic species with slender-tailed meerkats, tropical monkeys, sloths, armadillos, and two new fresh water Malawi and Tanganyika aquariums
- Enclosures of rhinoceroses and kangaroos
- Enclosures of zebras and giraffes
- Enclosures of antelopes and pygmy hippopotamuses
- Lakes in a natural style with flamingos and pelicans
- Enclosures of wolves and European bison

== History ==
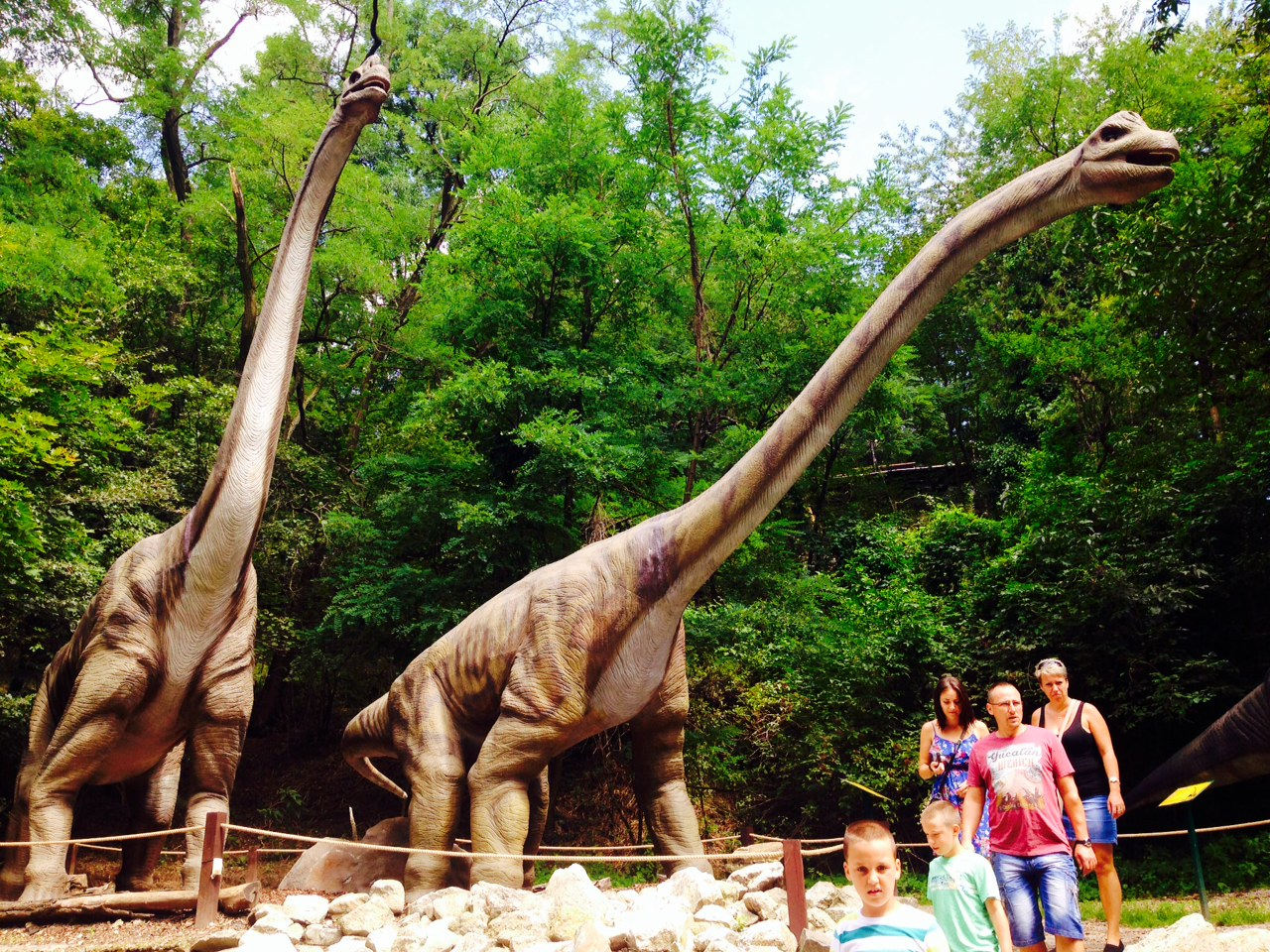
DinoPark was one of the attractions in the central part of Zoo Bratislava from 2004 to 2021.

Annual visitor numbers history
Year	Visitors total
2002	143,759
2003	139,483
2004	219,131
2005	202,954
2006	237,046
2007	250,396
2008	301,383
2009	274,718
2010	302,074
2011	336,661
2012	287,070
2013	280,359
2014	308,806
2015	303,365
2016	310,121
2017	287,991
2018	316,597
2019	315 008
2020	252 565

A proposal to establish a zoo in Bratislava first appeared in 1948. The first intention was to build a zoo corner within the area of the Park of Culture and Relaxation on the Danube riverfront but later on, taking into consideration the importance of Bratislava as the capital of Slovakia, it was agreed to build a separate breeding and educational institution. At first, in 1949, it was considered to build a zoo in the area of Železná studnička, part of the Bratislava Forest Park. But the experts' reports had confirmed this location as unsuitable. A new alternative was therefore accepted – to build a zoo in Mlynská dolina which originally covered 9 hectares (22 acres) and was later expanded to 90 hectares (220 acres).

Construction began in 1959 with the help of volunteers and students, and part of the zoo was officially opened on 9 May 1960. During the first decade of the existence of the zoo, there was already some achievement regarding breeding of macaques, baboons, porcupines, nutrias, leopards, pumas and dingos.

The zoo has undergone two major reductions, the first in 1981–1985, as a result of sewage system and motorway feeder construction, which reduced the area of the zoo to one-third, destroying two-thirds of the original exposition area and causing animal relocation within the zoo. As a consequence, a modern enclosure with the largest collection of exotic birds in Czechoslovakia had to be demolished and the birds were sent to other zoos. In 1991, a tiger escaped during the night and was shot within the zoo area. No person was harmed in the incident. In 2002 and 2003, the new enclosure for Turkmenian kulans, Bactrian camels and Shetland ponies was constructed in the forested part of the zoo and the building of a breeding facility for Heptner's markhor and Barbary sheep had begun.

The second reduction was in 2003, when construction for the D2 motorway access road to the Sitina Tunnel forced a relocation of the entrance gate. Subsequently, the zoo had been closed to the public from December 2003, until the building of a new entrance, parking lot and noise barrier wall was finished. In 2004 and 2005, development plans of Zoo Bratislava were accepted by the Bratislava municipal government and the construction of a new enclosure for big cats became one of the city priorities.

Between 2004 and 2021 Zoo Bratislava hosted an exhibition of Central European Mesozoic reptiles—DinoPark. At the area of almost 3 hectares (7.4 acres) DinoPark featured life-sized sculptures of dinosaurs that have been animated during the summer season. It also featured a 3D cinema, educational trails and a paleontological playground with fake fossils for children. Since 2006, the area also featured a specimen of the rare plant Wollemia.

In 2006, the new big cats pavilion was opened to the public, housing leopards, jaguars, tigers and lions. In 2007, development of the Primate House was started with the official opening in spring 2010. In the spring of 2008, the zoo shop and two playgrounds for children were constructed. Since 2009, Zoo Bratislava is allowed its own commercial business activities. In 2011, the zoo hit a record of 336,661 visitors during that year.

The zoo sustained heavy damage during the 2024 Central European floods.

== Collection ==
Class	Number of species	Number of individuals
Invertebrates	18	436
Fish	24	166
Amphibia	2	5
Reptiles	25	60
Birds	47	197
Mammals	78	413
Total	194	1277

As of 2024 the Bratislava Zoo contains a collection of 194 animal species and approximately 1277 animals in total, including rare and endangered species such as white lions, Sri Lankan leopards, jaguars, brown bears, Eurasian wolves, red kangaroos, white rhinoceros, giraffes, zebra, Barbary macaques, red pandas, Sumatran orangutans, chimpanzees and snowy owls.

Indoor enclosures feature numerous reptiles, birds and mammals such as ring-tailed lemurs, meerkats, golden-handed tamarins, silvery marmosets, dwarf crocodiles.

Photo gallery

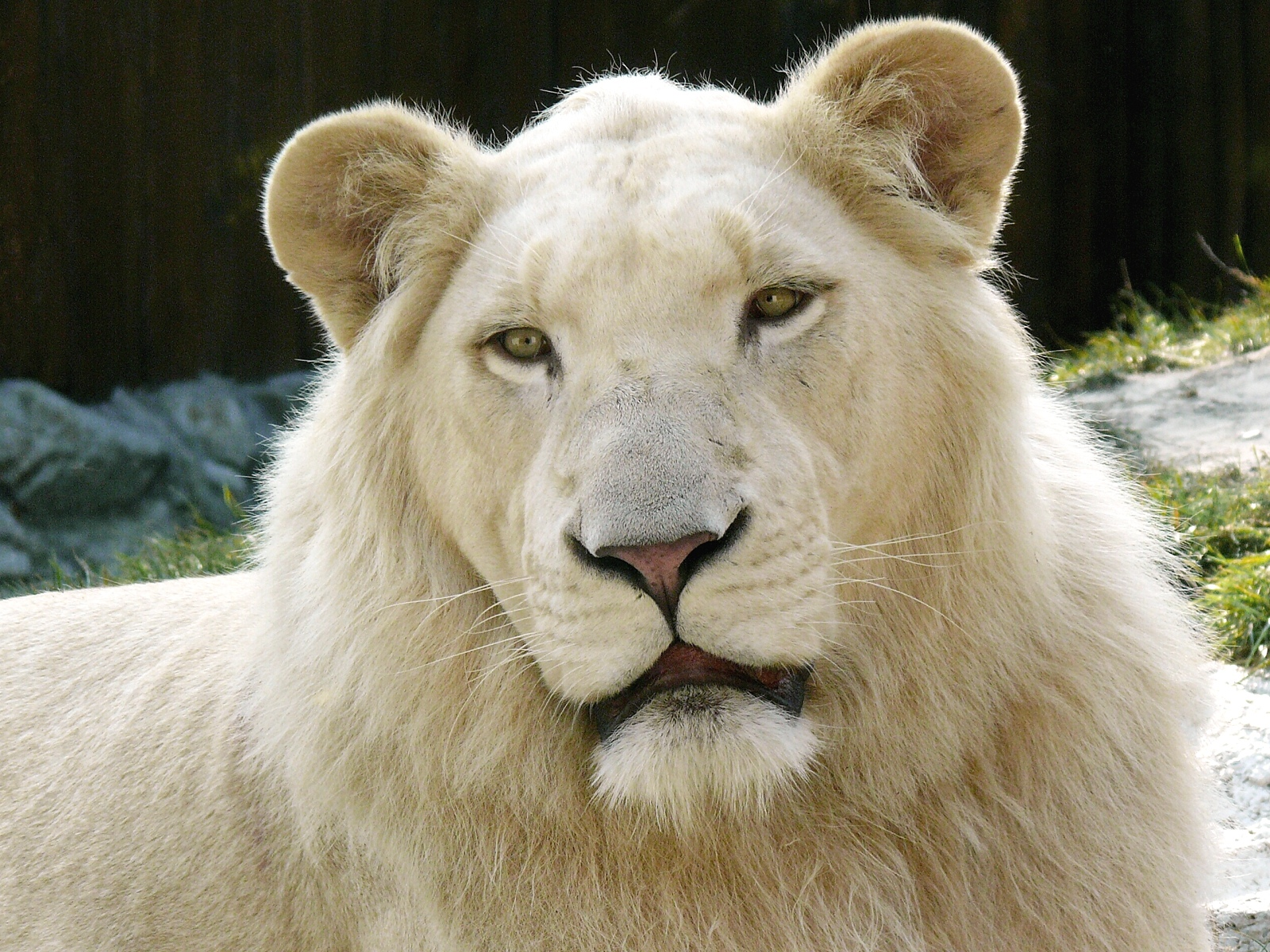
White lion

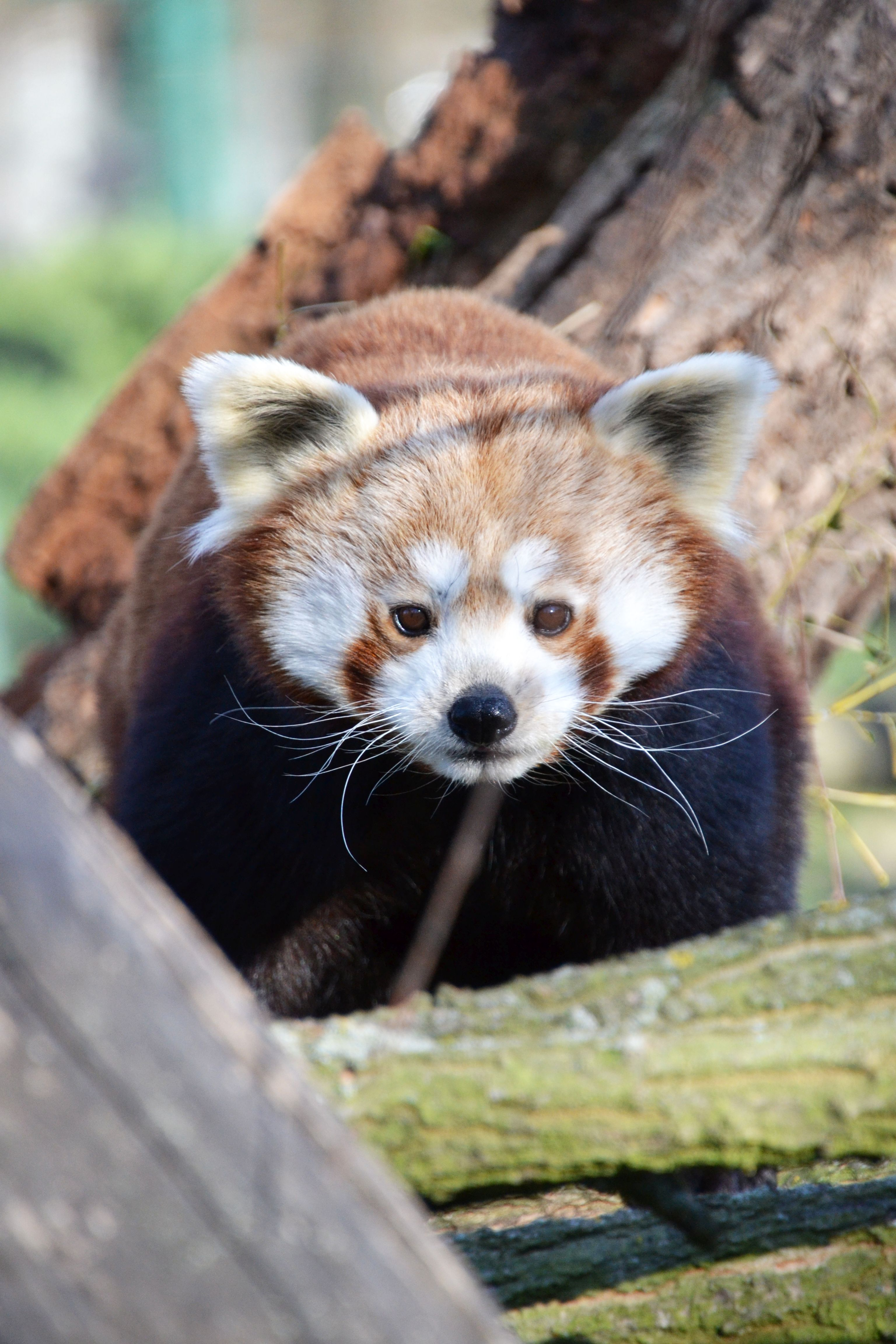
Red panda

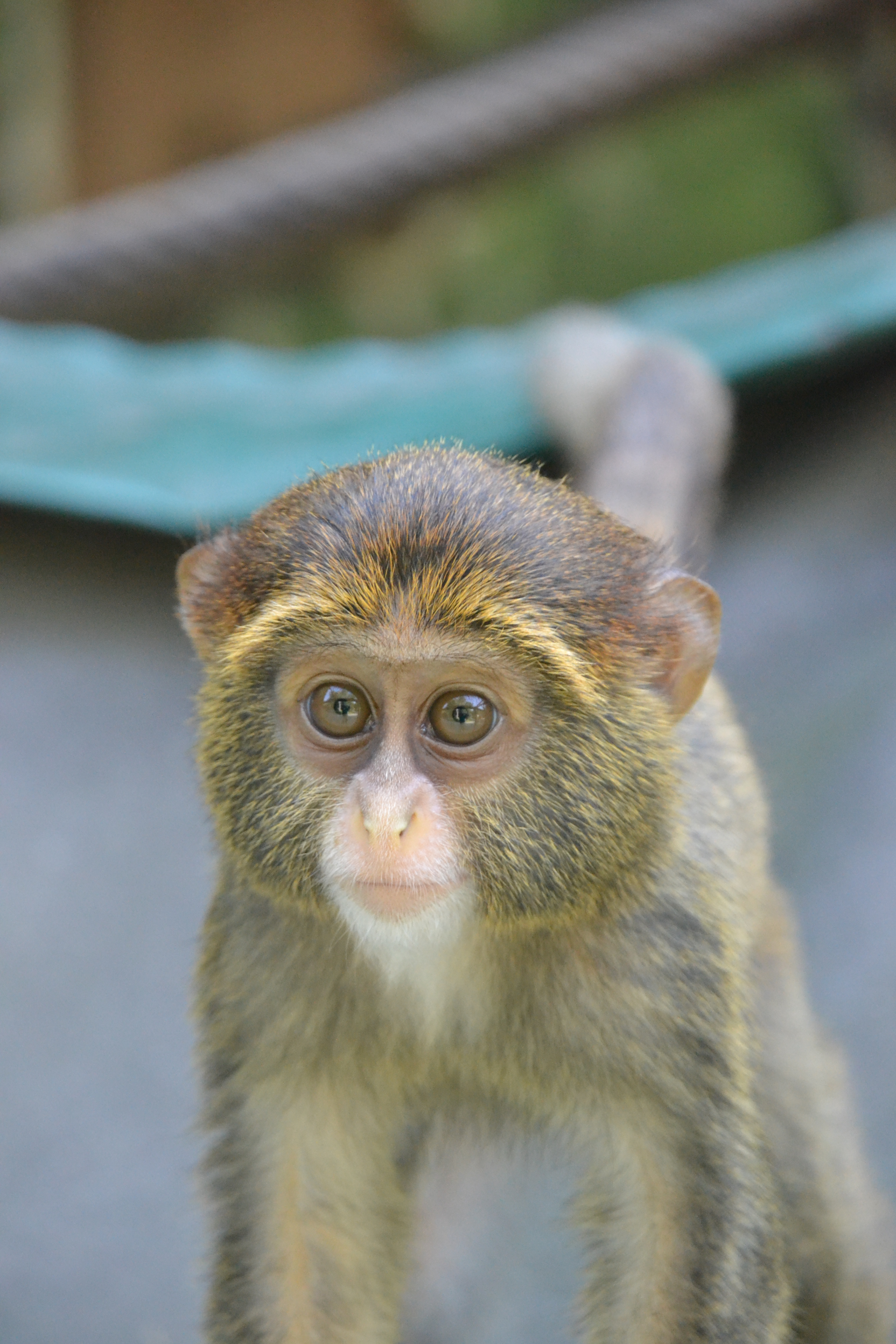
De Brazza's monkey

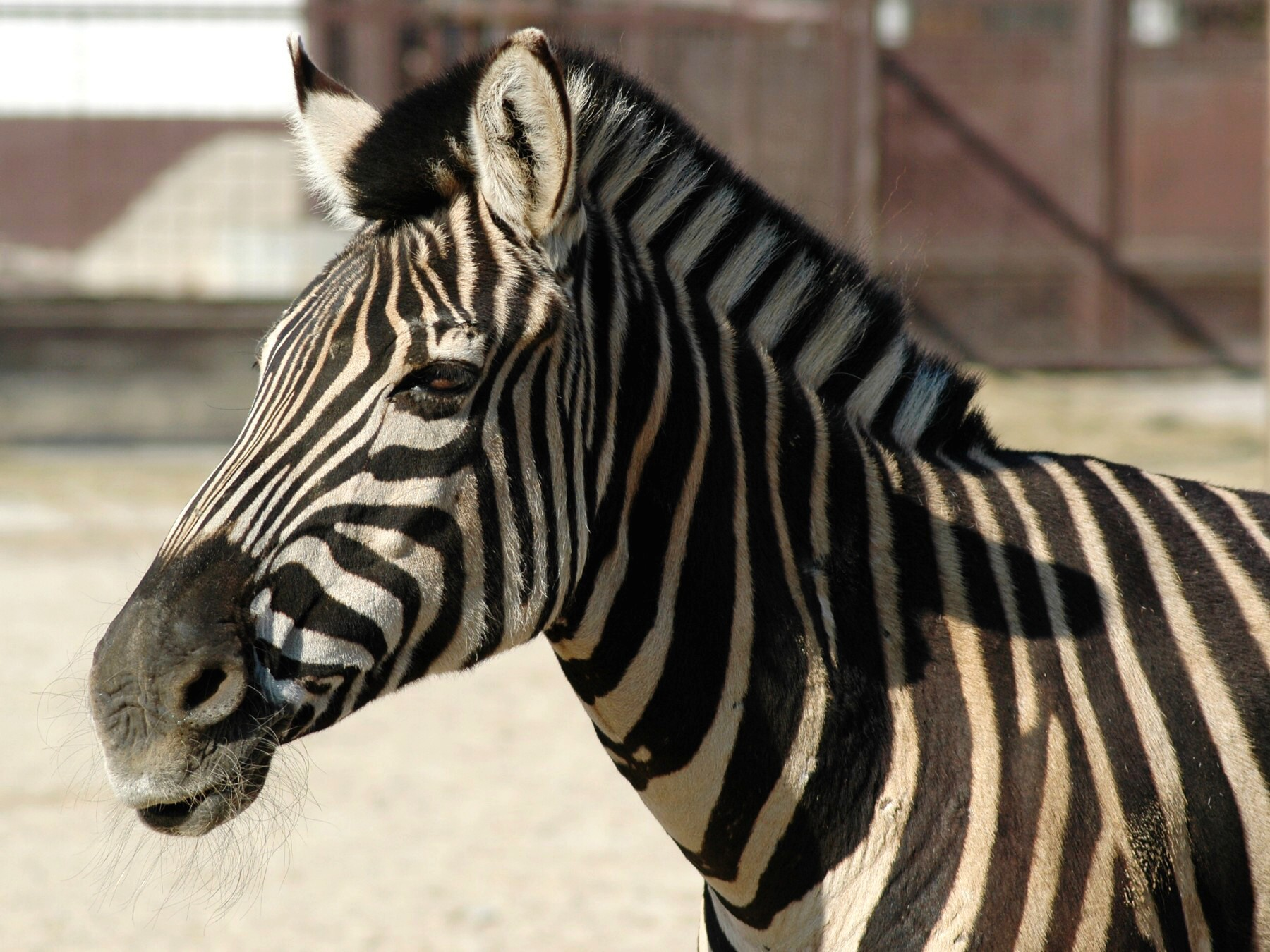
Zebra

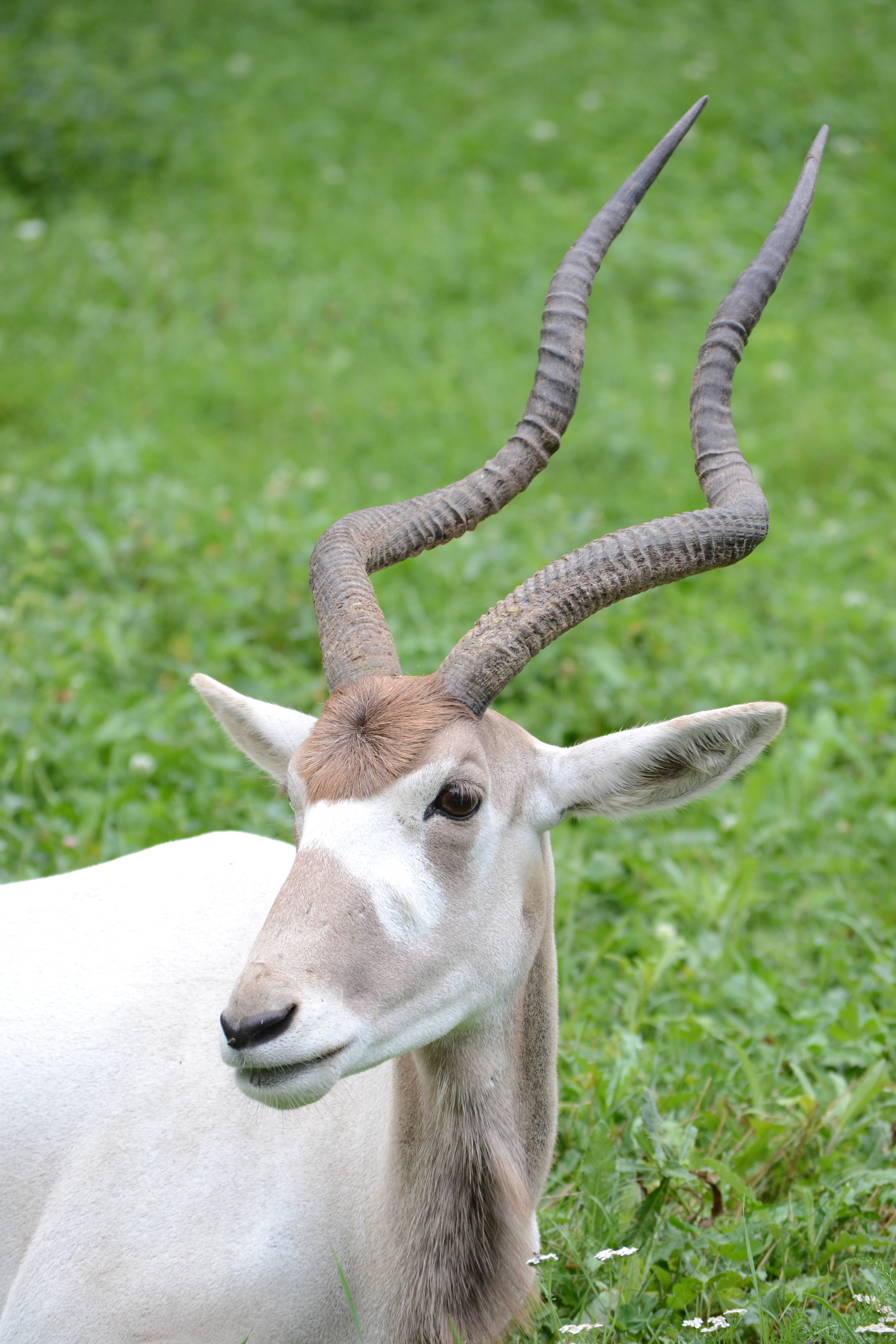
Addax

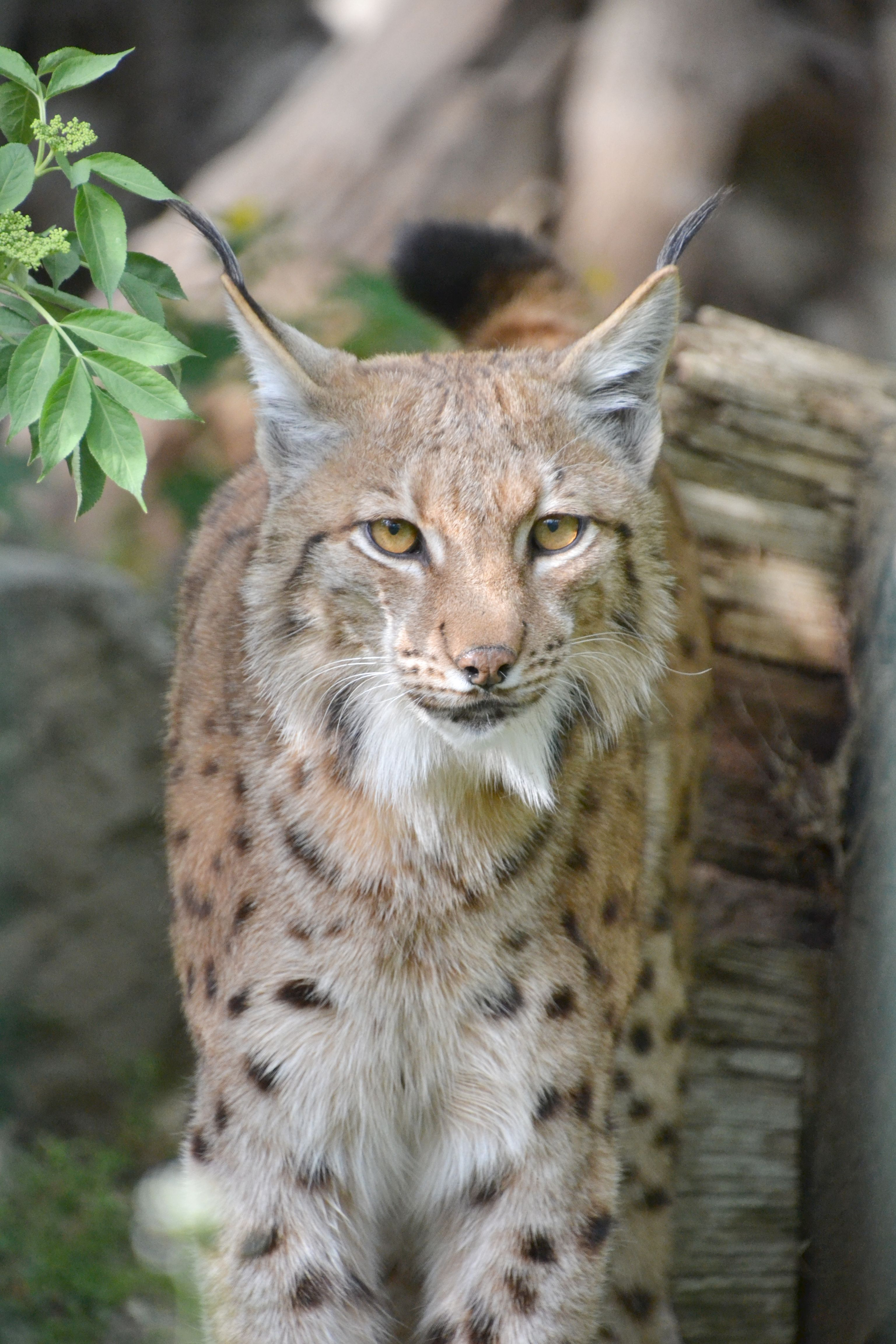
Carpathian lynx

== Association memberships ==
Zoo Bratislava is a member of the following zoo associations:

- Union of Czech and Slovak Zoological Gardens (UCSZOO) since 1990
- European Association of Zoos and Aquaria (EAZA) since 1994
- International Zoo Educators Association (IZE) since 2000
- Species360 non-profit organization since 2001
- Euroasian Regional Association of Zoological Parks and Aquariums (EARAZA) since 2010
