= Master of Engineering =

Academic or professional master's degree in engineering

A Master of Engineering (abbreviated MEng, ME, M.E., or M.Eng.) is a professional master's degree in the field of engineering.

== International variations ==
=== Australia ===
In Australia, the Master of Engineering degree is a research degree requiring completion of a thesis. Like the Master of Philosophy (M.Phil.), it is considered a lesser degree than the Doctor of Philosophy (Ph.D.). It is not to be confused with Master of Engineering Science, Master of Engineering Studies, or Master of Professional Engineering, which are coursework master's degrees. Exceptions are Monash University, which awards a Master of Engineering Science by either research or coursework, the University of Melbourne, which offers a Master of Engineering by coursework, and the University of Tasmania, which offers a Master of Engineering Science by research.

=== Finland ===
There are two distinct degrees in Finland: a taught university degree (diplomi-insinööri) and a polytechnic master's degree (insinööri (ylempi AMK)). While the former is translated as "Master of Science in Technology", the term "Master of Engineering" is predominantly used by Universities of Applied Sciences, which offer master's degree programs to holders of polytechnic bachelor's degrees (insinööri (amk)). As the European Bologna process directs, in order to get an M.Eng. degree, B.Eng. engineers have to additionally study full-time for one or two years and finalize a master's thesis. Most of the M.Eng. degree programs are taught in Finnish, but some Swedish and English language programs also exist.

=== France ===
In France, there are two distinct kinds of Master of Engineering: a master's degree taught in a university and an engineer degree, Diplôme d'Ingénieur, taught in engineering schools, which is a parallel education system of the university, named Grande école. Master of Engineering and an engineer's degree are both equal in terms of level of education, and generally lead to the same positions. The engineer's title in France is strictly protected and can be used only after a successful graduation from an Engineer School accredited by the state. Although a master's degree in engineering from a university is a degree that does not confer the right to use the title of "graduate engineer", even if the level and responsibilities of the position are identical. While a university's master's degree in engineering is a grade that does not give the right to use the Engineer's title, even if the position's level and responsibilities are same. For the same reason, a Bachelor of Engineering does not allow a graduate to be called "Engineer" or to work as an engineer. To work as an engineer requires 5 years of education in a university or an engineering school, and using the title of "graduate engineer" requires graduation from an engineering school.

=== Germany ===
In Germany, the local engineer's degrees (Diplomingenieur (Dipl.-Ing.), a first degree after five years of study at a university and Dipl.-Ing. (FH), the engineering degree offered by Fachhochschulen after four years of study) were abolished in most universities and "Fachhochschulen" in 2010 and were replaced by postgraduate master's degrees (M.Sc. and M.Eng.).

The first Master of Engineering courses were introduced in Germany in 2000 as a result of the Bologna process. This type of master's degree is usually offered by Fachhochschulen (Universities of Applied Sciences) and a few smaller German universities and is typically a two-year program (Fachhochschulen and universities) with application-oriented coursework and an applied or research thesis.

The entry requirement is the successful completion of a bachelor's degree or an equivalent from before the Bologna process, with good marks.

The nine leading German technical universities (Group of TU9), like most European universities of technology, prefer awarding the Master of Science degree for completing engineering science studies in a master's program.

=== India ===
The Master of Engineering (M.E.) is a postgraduate degree, typically awarded after two years of advanced study in engineering. The majority of the engineering colleges in India additionally offer a Master of Technology (MTech), that is equivalent to an M.E. The M.E. is considered a path to obtain in-depth technical expertise and career advancement in the engineering sector. Those with a bachelor's degree in engineering, like a Bachelor of Engineering, Bachelor of Technology, or AMIE in an engineering discipline, are eligible. Admission often requires performance in the GATE, though some universities may have their own entrance exams.

=== New Zealand ===
In New Zealand, the Master of Engineering degree is generally a research-based degree requiring completion of a thesis in key universities (University of Auckland, University of Canterbury, etc.). Similar to the UK's Master of Philosophy (M.Phil.) in engineering or technology, it is considered a lesser degree than Doctor of Philosophy (Ph.D.) and a higher degree than a coursework master's. It is not to be confused with Master of Engineering Studies, which is a coursework master's degree.

At the Auckland University of Technology (AUT), this degree can be achieved either by completing a thesis (research pathway) or a combination of coursework and research project (coursework pathway).

=== Slovakia ===
FIIT STU Institution of Engineering and Technology (IET) accreditation for two master's degree study programs: Intelligent Software Systems (combined fields of study Software Engineering – major and Artificial Intelligence – secondary) and Internet Technologies (in the field of study Computing Engineering); three bachelor's degree study programs and two doctoral degree study programs.

=== United Kingdom ===
In the United Kingdom, the Master of Engineering (MEng) is the highest award for undergraduate studies in engineering. It is the standard university-level qualification taken by people wishing to become Chartered Engineers registered with the Engineering Council (EngC). The MEng degree represents the minimum educational standard required to become a chartered engineer, but there are other equally satisfactory ways to demonstrate this standard, such as the completion of a BEng Honours and a subsequent postgraduate diploma, MA, MSc, or through experiential learning. The UK MEng (undergraduate degree) is typically equivalent to the European Diplom Ingenieur (Dipl.-Ing.) and Civilingenjör degrees.

Universities are free to set their own entry requirements. Some universities, such as Oxford, Cambridge, and some courses at Imperial, only admit students to study for the MEng degree, although these courses often allow a student to graduate with a Bachelor of Science (BSc) or Bachelor of Engineering (BEng) degree after three years. Other universities, such as the University of Greenwich, University of Surrey, Coventry University, Brunel University and Swansea University, admit students to read for BEng Honours and MEng courses and allow students to change between the two during the early years of the course. The Open University offers the MEng degree as a postgraduate qualification, but requires students to complete its course within four years of completing a BEng Honours degree.

Requirements for professional registration as an Incorporated Engineer or a Chartered Engineer are based on a standard of professional competence and commitment, as set out in the professional standard UK-SPEC. Individuals generally develop these through education and working experience.

==== History ====
Since its introduction, the MEng has become the degree of choice for most undergraduate engineers, as was intended. The most common exception to this is international students who, because of the substantially higher fees they are charged, sometimes opt to take the traditional BEng/BSc route where that is available. All of the engineering institutions have made an MEng the minimum academic standard necessary to become a Chartered Engineer, in accordance with the UK-SPEC. Students who graduated before the changes in the rules will still be allowed to use their bachelor's degree for this purpose and those who have earned a bachelor's degree since the changes can usually take some additional courses (known as 'further learning') over time to reach an equivalent standard to the MEng. Some older universities such as Durham allow students to obtain the BEng degree after the third year before continuing to the fourth year.

=== United States ===
In the United States, the Master of Engineering degree is generally a professional degree offered as a coursework-based alternative to the traditional research-based Master of Science. It is typically a two-year program, entered after the completion of a 4-year bachelor's degree, and many universities allow students to choose between the Master of Engineering and the Master of Science.

The Master of Engineering degree is offered at many leading universities in the United States on either a full-time or part-time (weekends or evenings) basis. Some Master of Engineering programs offer flexible delivery formats, including face-to-face, online, synchronous, and asynchronous modalities. Varied delivery options enable students to complete coursework via methods that work with their schedules, catering to working professionals.

Some MEng degree programs require a scholarly project in addition to coursework. They require additional courses beyond those required for Master of Science students in order to better prepare students for professional careers. Some of them highly encourage students to participate in collaborative consulting projects. These courses may include topics such as business fundamentals, management, and leadership.

== See also ==
- British degree abbreviations
- Doctor of Engineering
- Engineering education
