= Comenius University Faculty of Mathematics, Physics and Informatics =

Unit of Comenius University in Slovakia

Coordinates: 48°09′09″N 17°04′13″E

Faculty of Mathematics, Physics and Informatics
- Fakulta matematiky, fyziky a informatiky
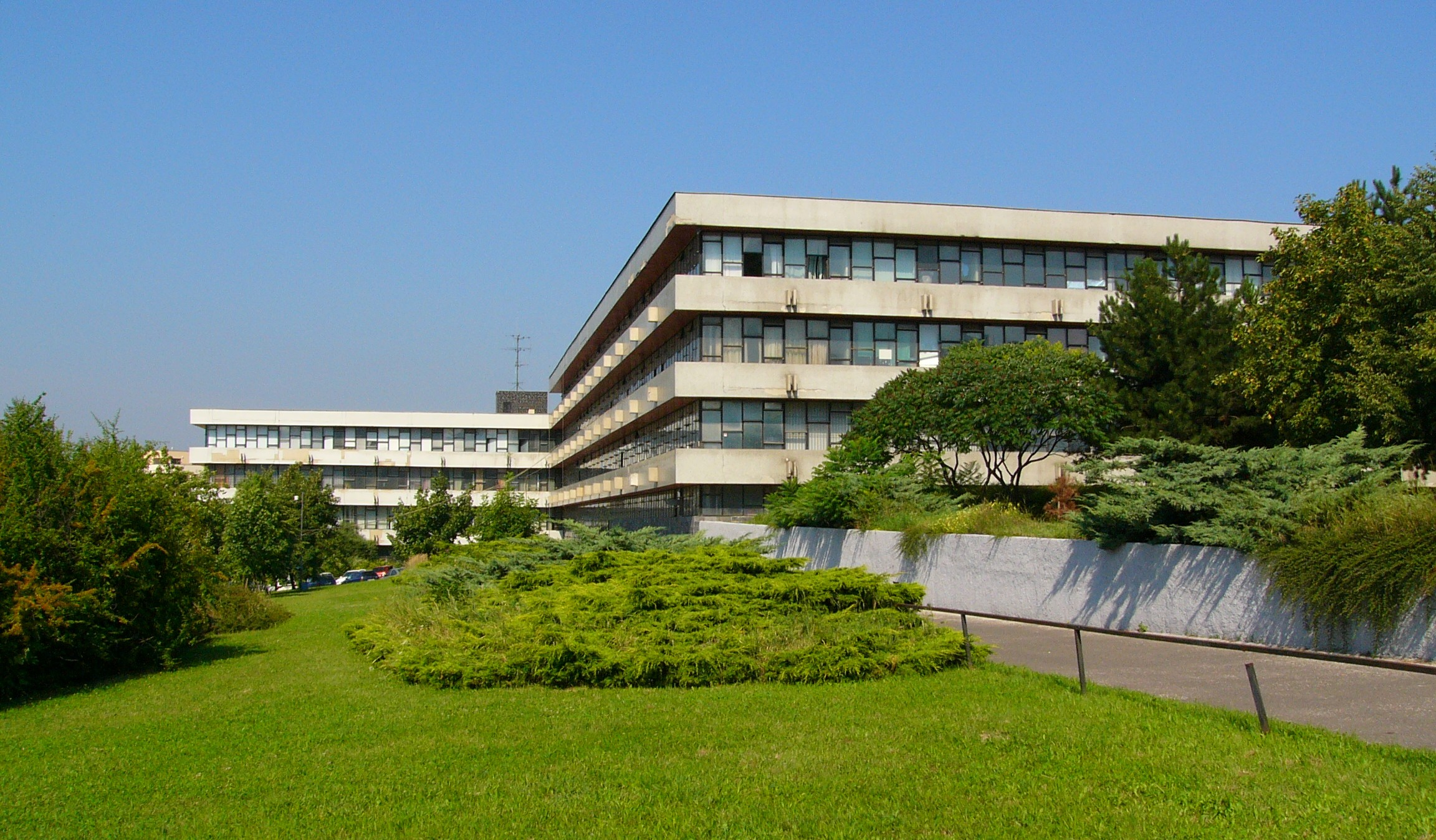
- Building of the Faculty of Mathematics, Physics and Informatics
- Former names: Faculty of Mathematics and Physics (Slovak: Matematicko-fyzikálna fakulta)
- Type: Faculty
- Established: 1980
- Parent institution: Comenius University
- Dean: Prof. RNDr. Daniel Ševčovič, DrSc.
- Students: 1644 (2015)
- Doctoral students: 169 (2015)
- Location: Bratislava, Slovakia
- Website: fmph.uniba.sk

The Faculty of Mathematics, Physics and Informatics (FMPH; Slovak: FMFI; Slovak: Fakulta matematiky, fyziky a informatiky; colloquial: Matfyz) is one of 13 faculties of the Comenius University in Bratislava, the capital of Slovakia. The faculty provides higher education in mathematics, physics and informatics, as well as teacher training in subjects related to these branches of study. It was established in 1980 by separating from the Faculty of Natural Sciences under the name of Faculty of Mathematics and Physics (Slovak: Matematicko-fyzikálna fakulta). Its name was changed to the contemporary name in 2000.

In 2015, Faculty of Mathematics, Physics and Informatics was ranked first in the group of natural sciences in the ranking of faculties in Slovakia by the Academic Ranking and Rating Agency (ARRA).

The campus is located in Mlynská dolina in Bratislava, along with the Faculty of Natural Sciences of the Comenius University, the Faculty of Informatics and Information Technologies and the Faculty of Electrical Engineering and Information Technology of the Slovak University of Technology.

Endowment of the faculty in 2015 was €11.7 million.

== Departments ==
=== Mathematics ===
- Department of Algebra, Geometry and Didactics of Mathematics
- Department of Applied Mathematics and Statistics
- Department of Mathematical Analysis and Numerical Mathematics

=== Physics ===
- Department of Astronomy, Physics of the Earth and Meteorology
- Department of Experimental Physics
- Department of Nuclear Physics and Biophysics
- Department of Theoretical Physics and Didactics of Physics

=== Informatics ===
- Department of Applied Informatics
- Department of Informatics
- Department of Informatics Education

== Study programmes ==
The faculty offers undergraduate and postgraduate education in the fields of mathematics, physics, informatics and teaching.

=== Mathematics ===
==== Undergraduate ====
- Mathematics
- Economic and Financial Mathematics
- Managerial Mathematics
- Insurance Mathematics

==== Postgraduate ====
- Computer Graphics and Geometry
- Economic and Financial Mathematics
- Mathematics
- Managerial Mathematics
- Probability and Mathematical Statistics

=== Physics ===
==== Undergraduate ====
- Physics
- Technical Physics
- Renewable Energy Sources and Environmental Physics
- Biomedical Physics

==== Postgraduate ====
- Astronomy and Astrophysics
- Biophysics and Chemical Physics
- Biomedical Physics
- Environmental Physics, Renewable Energy Sources, Meteorology and Climatology
- Nuclear and Sub-nuclear Physics
- Optics, Lasers and Optical Spectroscopy
- Physics of the Earth
- Plasma Physics
- Solid State Physics
- Theoretical Physics

=== Informatics ===
==== Undergraduate ====
- Informatics
- Applied Informatics
- Bioinformatics
- Data science

==== Postgraduate ====
- Informatics
- Applied Informatics
- Cognitive Science

=== Teacher training ===
Teacher training forms a separate group of study. Physical education instruction is provided by the Faculty of Physical Education and Sports and English is provided by the Faculty of Arts. Special teacher training is also offered for those graduates of the faculty following a non-teaching course of study who are interested in gaining the Teacher Certificates for secondary schools.

==== Undergraduate ====
- Teaching of descriptive geometry in combination with mathematics
- Teaching of informatics in combination with mathematics, physics and biology
- Teaching of mathematics in combination with physics, informatics, descriptive geometry and physical education
- Teaching of physics in combination with mathematics or informatics

==== Postgraduate ====
- Teaching of descriptive geometry in combination
- Teaching of informatics in combination
- Teaching of mathematics in combination
- Teaching of physics in combination

== Facilities ==
- Faculty library (located in the pavilion of Mathematics)
- Astronomical Observatory of Modra

== Student life ==
=== ŠKAS ===
Student House of the Academic Senate of FMFI UK (ŠKAS; Slovak: Študentská komora Akademického senátu FMFI UK) is an association representing students in the academic senate of the faculty. The student representatives are voted by students of the faculty in annual election.

ŠKAS organizes events such as Deposition (Slovak: Beánia Matfyzákov), Christmas cabbage soup and punch (Slovak: Vianočná kapustnica a punč), Ball of FMFI UK, Doors Open Day and Freshers' week. ŠKAS also maintains a student room Cauchy Clubroom (Slovak: Cauchyho klubovňa), various free time facilities at the faculty and publishes an online guidebook for new students.

== Publishing ==
The faculty publishes open access academic journals:

- Acta Mathematica Universitatis Comenianae (ISSN 0862-9544)
- Acta Physica Universitatis Comenianae (ISSN 0231-889X)

== Notable alumni and academic staff ==
- Vladimír Černý – physicist, independently described simulated annealing in 1985
- Martin Mojžiš – popular Slovak theoretical physicist
- Martin Benko – director of the Slovak Hydrometeorological Institute

== Gallery ==
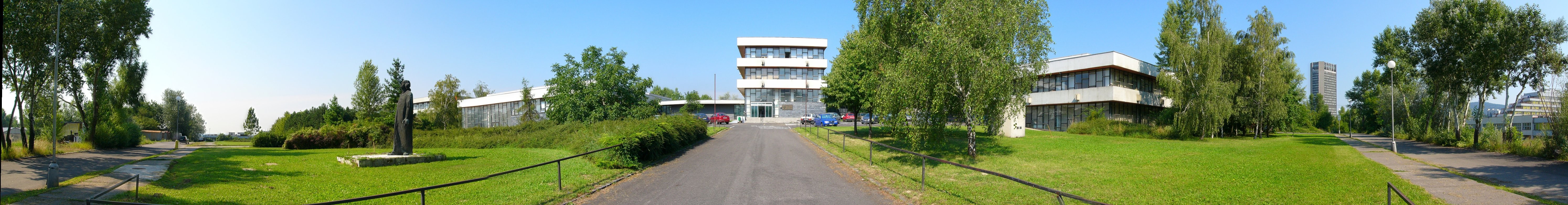
Panorama of the Pavilion of Mathematics and Informatics (July 2008)
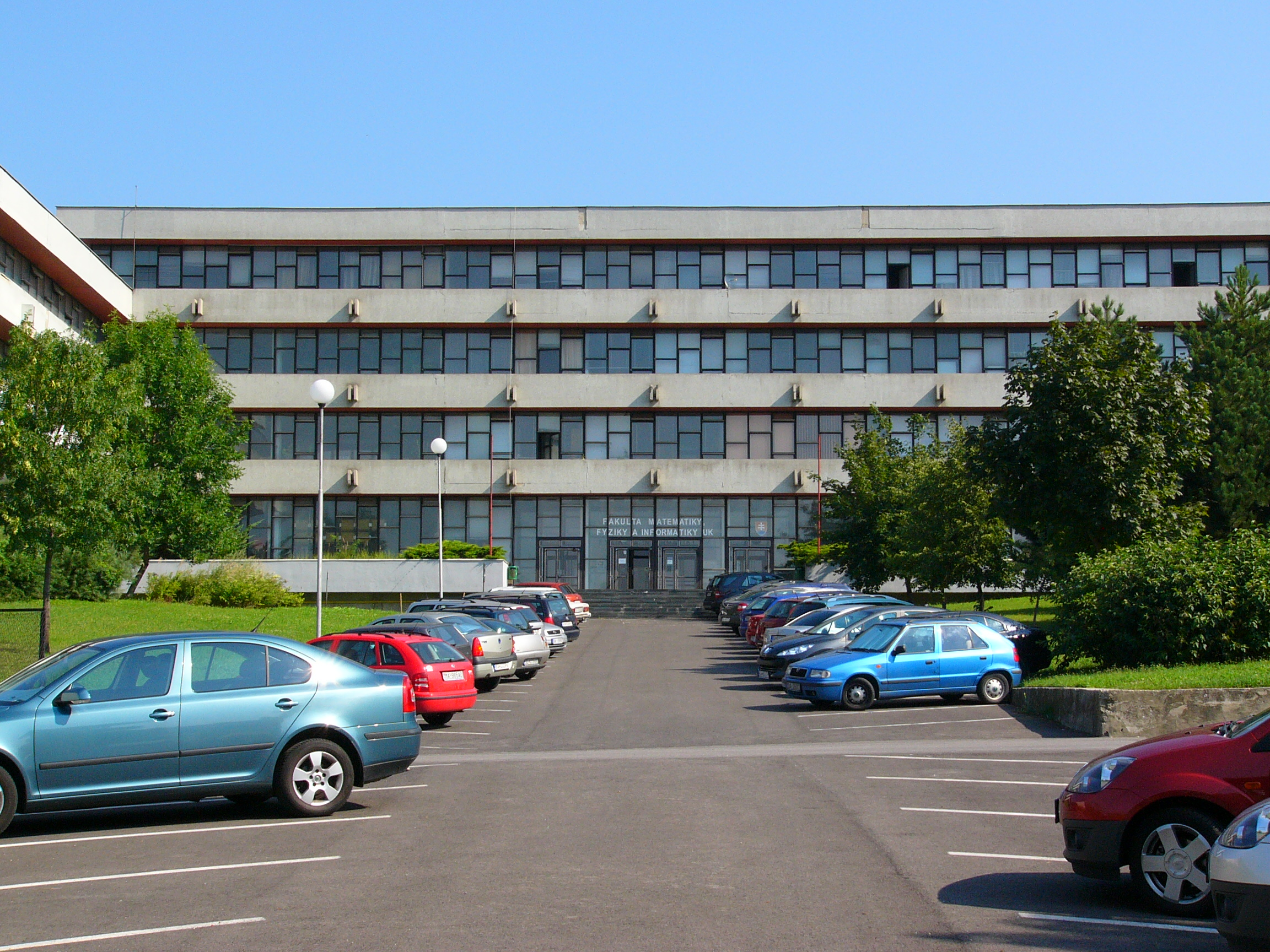
F1 Pavilion of Physics

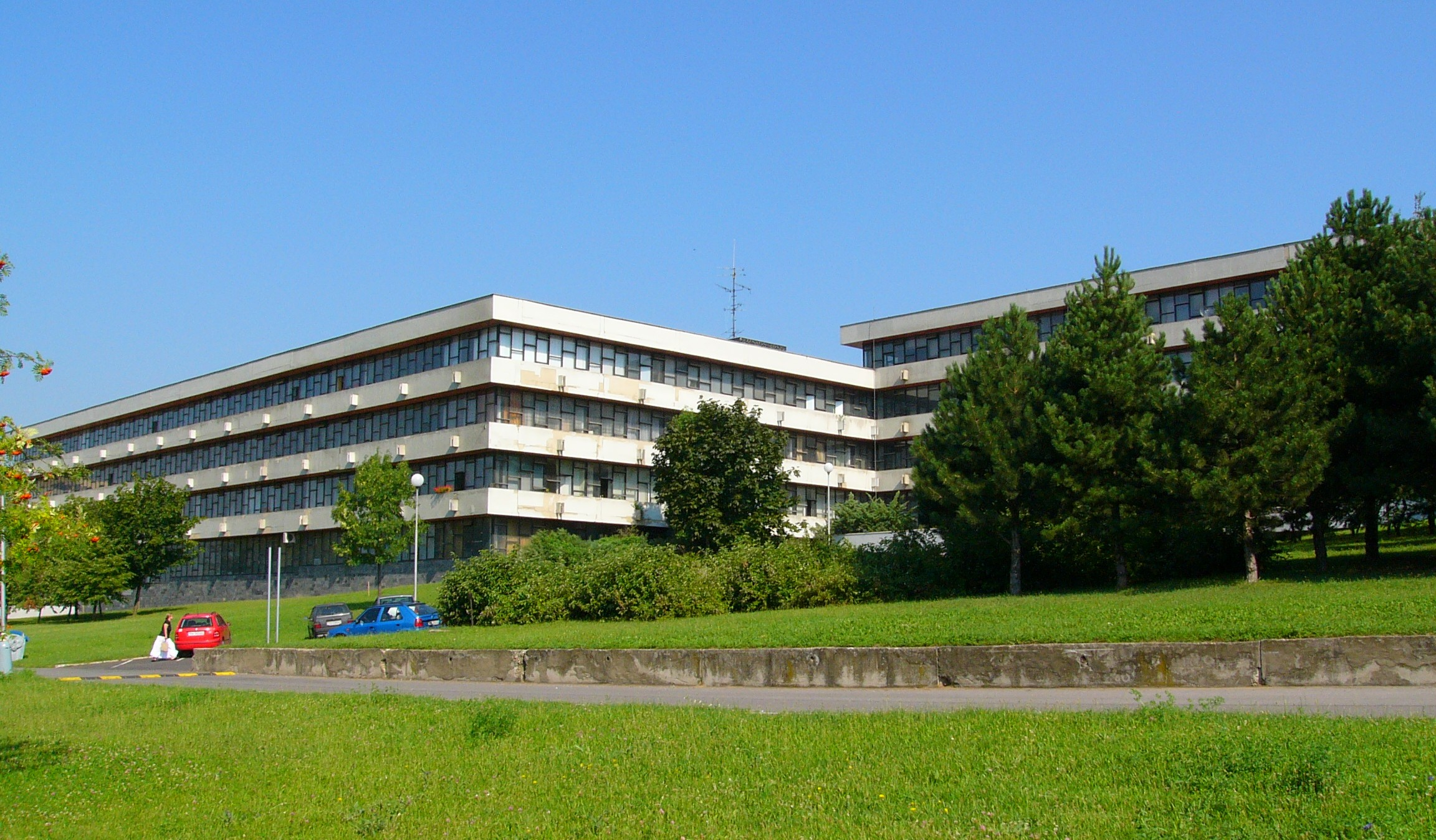
F2 Pavilion of Physics

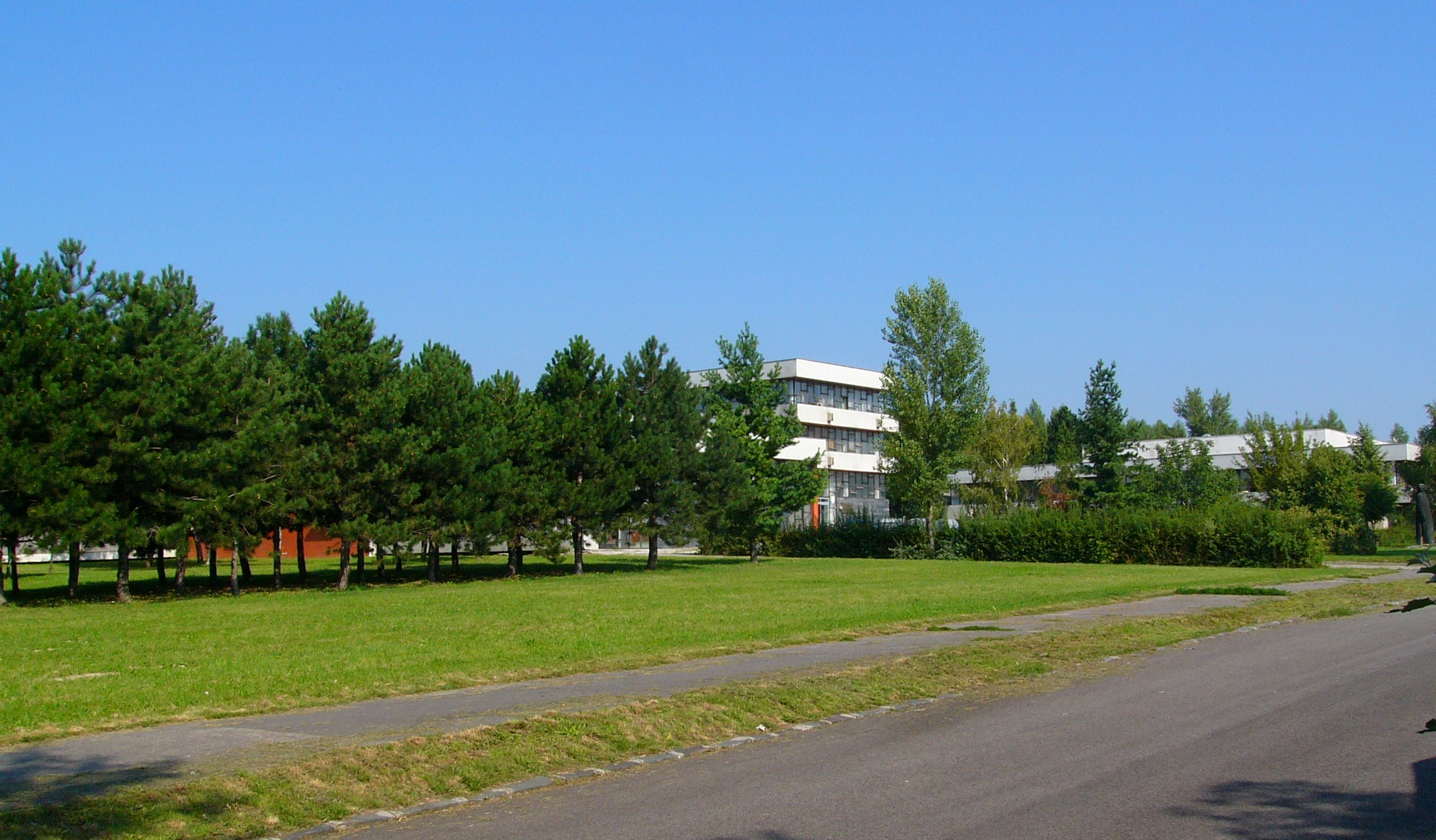
Pavilion of Mathematics and Informatics

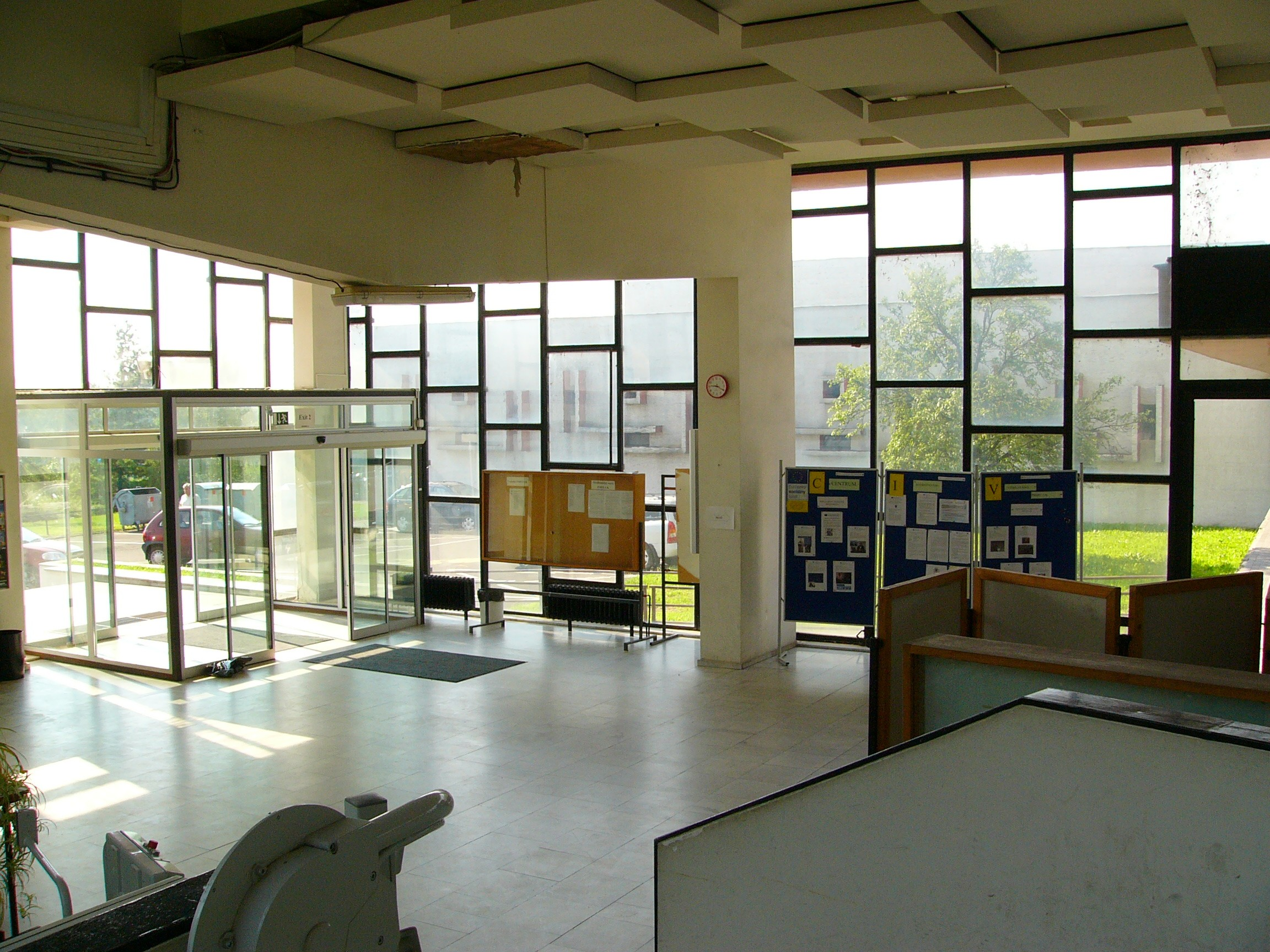
Lobby of the Pavilion of Mathematics and Informatics

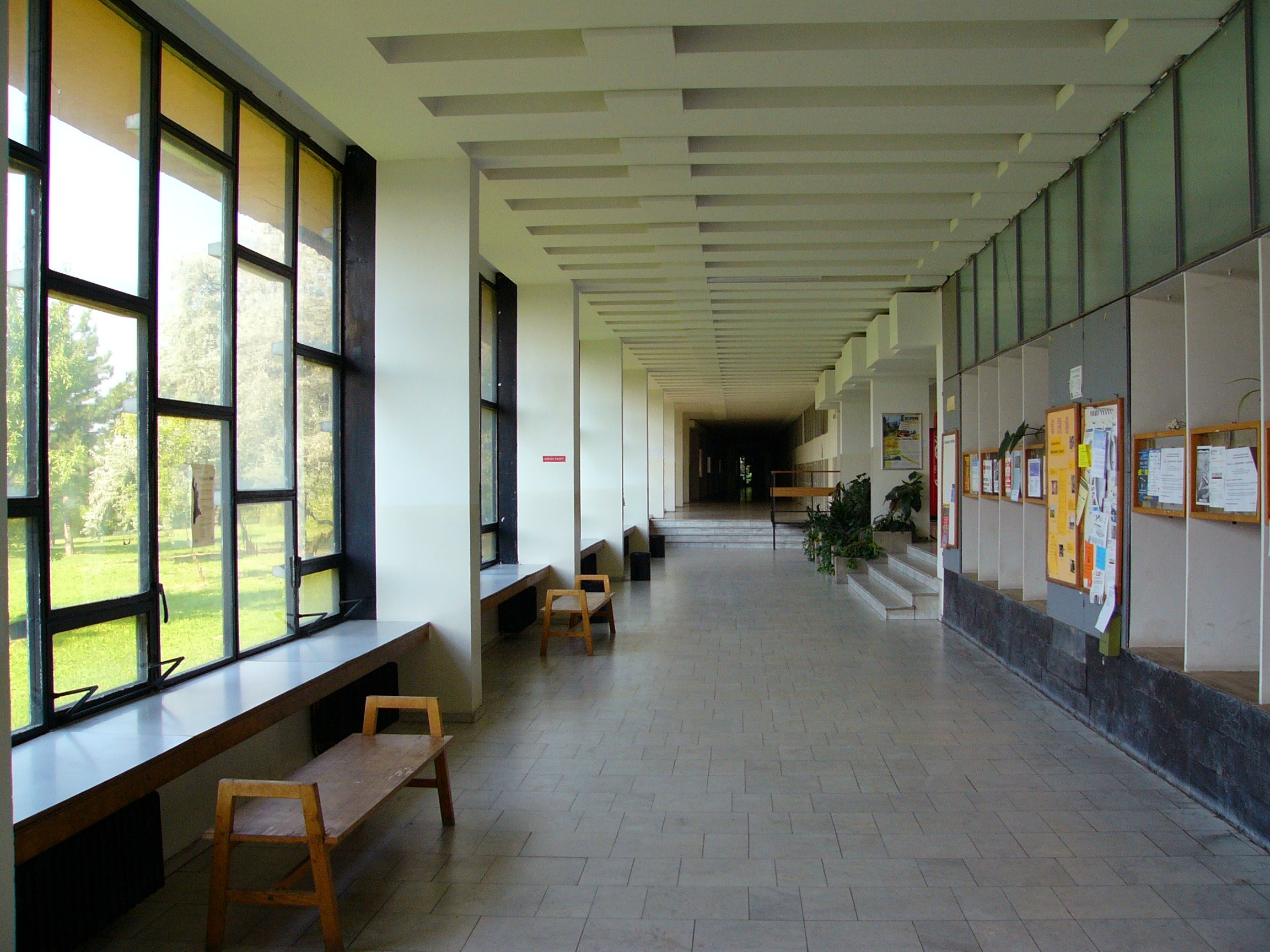
Pavilion of Mathematics and Informatics

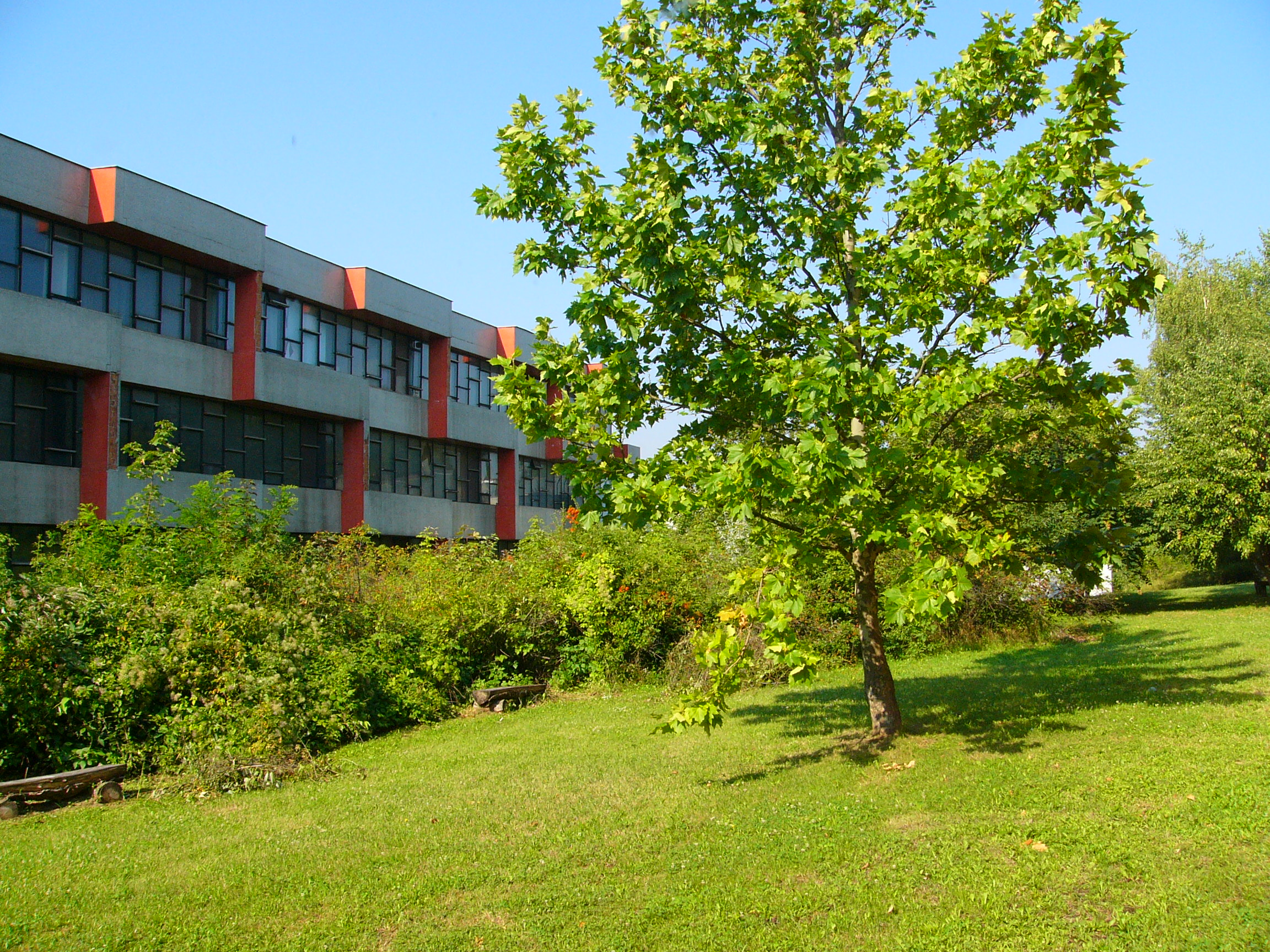
Park between the pavilions

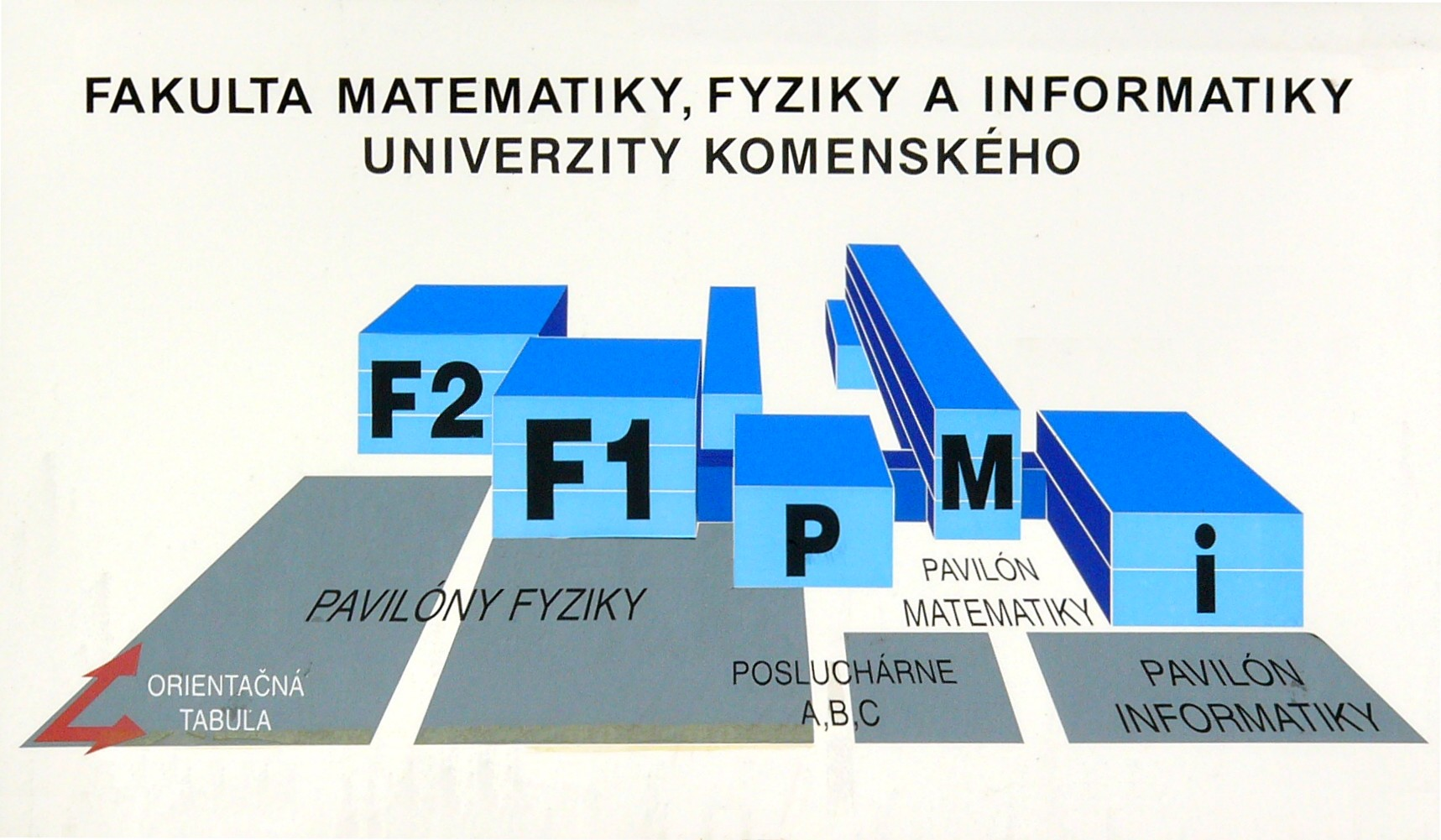
Map of the building

== See also ==
- Comenius University
