= Bratislava Model United Nations =

Annual high school conference in Slovakia

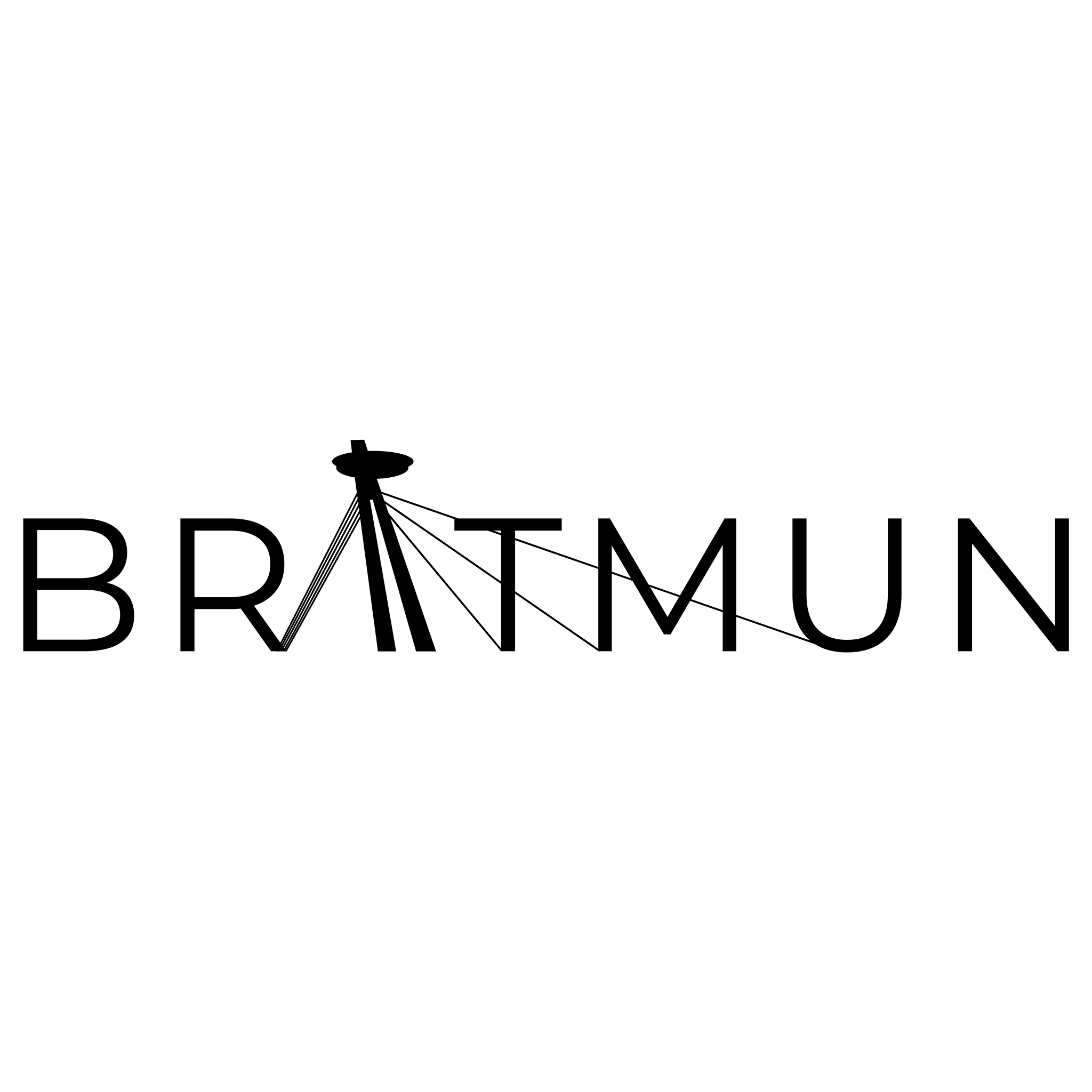
- Abbreviation: BratMUN
- Formation: 2001
- Type: Annual Conference
- Headquarters: Bratislava
- Official language: English
- Affiliations: Gymnasium Jur Hronec
- Website: https://www.bratmun.sk/

The Bratislava Model United Nations (BratMUN) conference is an annual three-day event for high-school Model United Nations students. The conference is organized and held by a diverse organizational team from the National and IB program at Gymnasium Jur Hronec. BratMUN is funded by the Novohradská Foundation and supported financially or product-wise by numerous sponsors throughout the years. It is currently in its 21st installment.

== Committee sessions ==
BratMUN features a host of committees including the Security Council, Economic and Social Council, the Economic and Financial Affairs Council, the World Health Organization, the Human Rights Council, the International Court of Justice, the Disarmament and International Security, the Historical Security Council, etc. Delegates in these committees represent member states of the United Nations, explore approaches to foreign problems and establish resolutions and treaties addressing these issues. BratMUN has also featured a non-UN crisis committee. Some of the topics dealt by the delegates at BratMUN were the abolishment of the death penalty, nuclear disarmament, sea piracy, nuclear energy, the abolishment of sexual harassment at workplaces, or at armed conflicts, future regulations of digital privacy and much more.

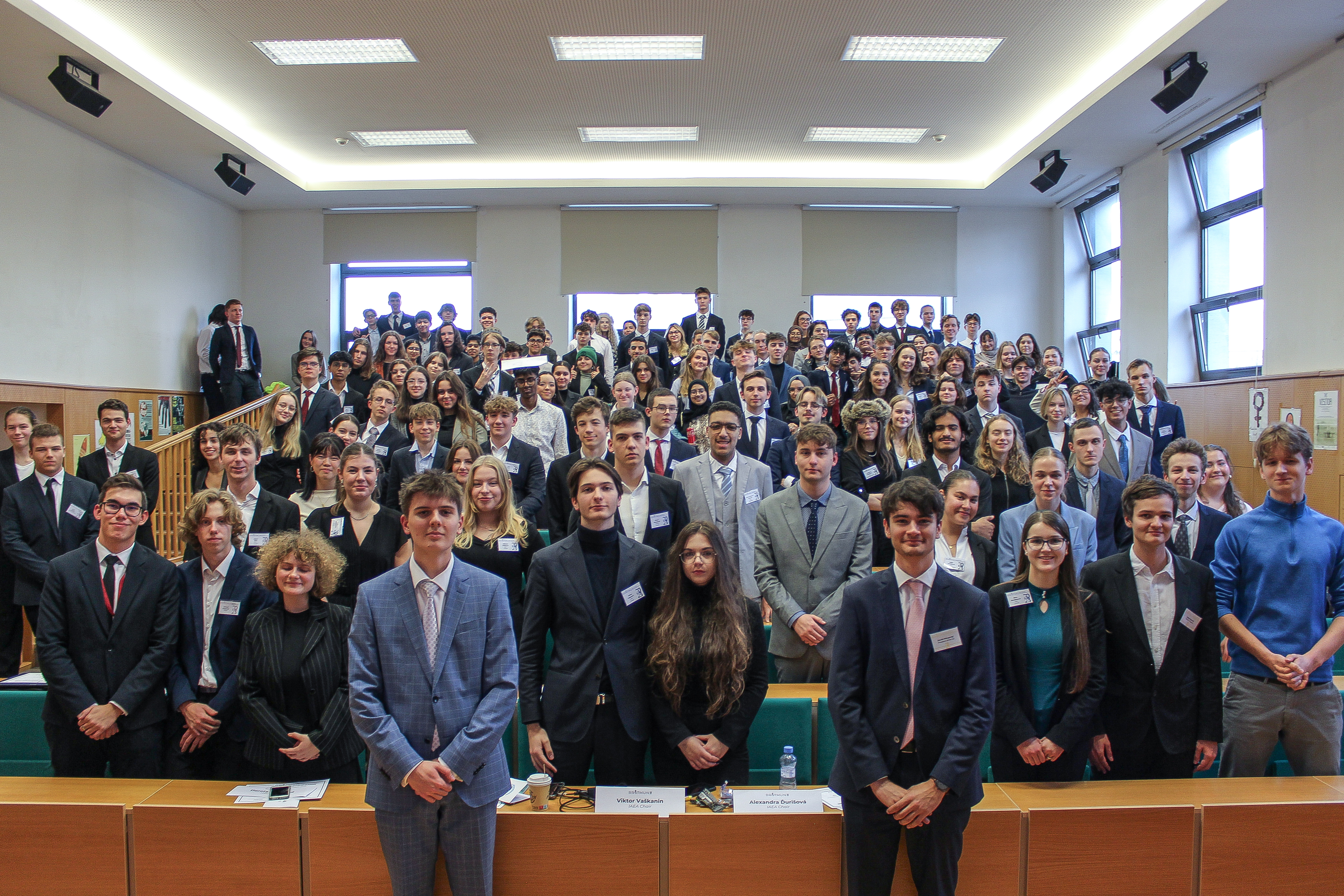
Group photo of delegates, chairs and secretariat from General Assembly BratMUN 2023

BratMUN had a three-year hiatus due to the COVID-19 pandemic, restarting in 2023 with a new organizing team, venues, and motto.

== Past venues ==
Some of the past BratMUN conference premises include:

- Pan-European university
- The Faculty of Natural Sciences of the Comenius University
- National Council of the Slovak Republic
- The Faculty of Social and Economic Sciences of the Comenius University
- Historic building of the National Council of the Slovak Republic

== Notable speakers ==
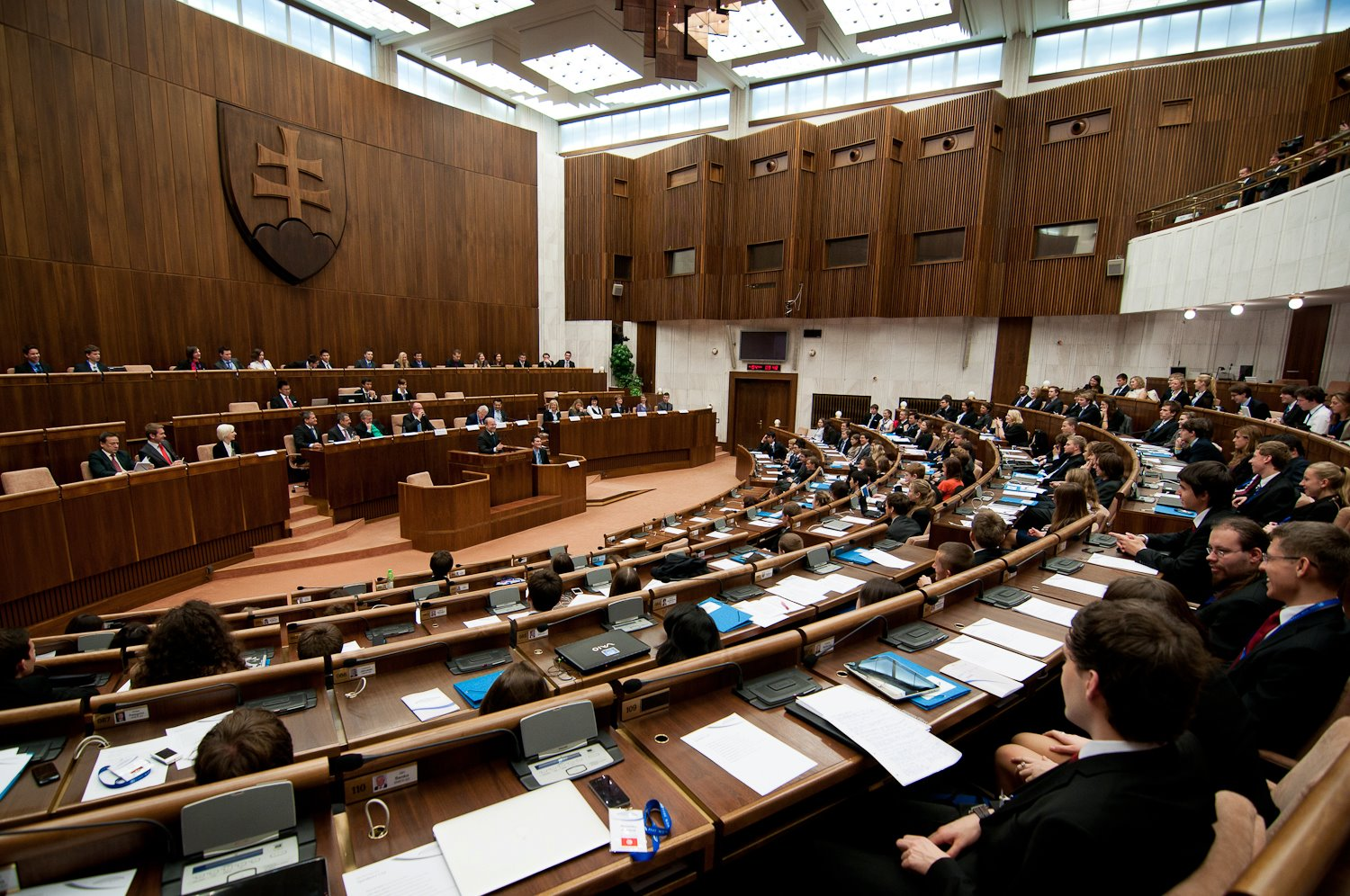
A photo of students participating in the Bratmun conference.

- 2001 – Mikuláš Dzurinda (former Prime minister)
- 2016 – Lucia Zitnanska (ex-Minister of Justice SR)
- 2018 – Miroslav Lajcak (Slovak Minister of Foreign and European Affairs)
