= Jur Hronec =

Slovak mathematician

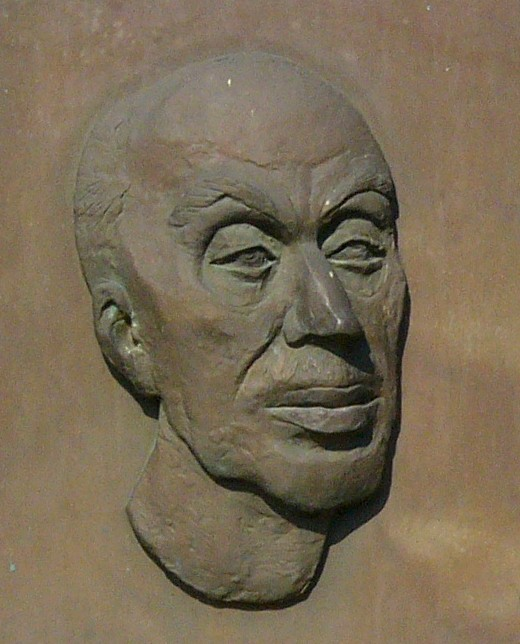

Jur Hronec (17 May 1881 – 1 December 1959) was a Slovak mathematician.

== Early years ==
Jur Hronec was born in Gočovo, Slovakia (then Gócs, Kingdom of Hungary). He grew up in modest circumstances in a farmer's family. After graduating from high school in Rožňava he studied mathematics and physics at the University of Kolozsvár under supervision of Professor Ludwig Schlesinger. From 1908 to 1914 he studied at Göttingen, Giessen, Berlin, Switzerland and Paris, in the years 1922–1923 in Prague, Göttingen and Giessen. His doctoral dissertation in the field of differential equations was defended in 1912 in Giessen.

== Career ==
Between 1906–1922, after successfully completing university, he worked in years with fewer interruptions while on study abroad at school in Kezmarok. Jur Hronec was habilitated at Charles University in Prague in 1923. From 1924 to 1939 he was professor of mathematics at the Czech Technical University in Brno. Educational work of the school determined his further scientific focus. He recognised the importance of mathematics in science and technology and focused his research on application to technical problems. His academic lifetime achievement includes three areas: scientific, educational and public. Research activities focused primarily on differential equations. He studied problems of Erdős–Fuchs theorem of linear differential equations and their generalisation.

He wrote a considerable number of scientific papers, publications and university textbooks, the most important are:

- Algebraic equations and their use in analytical geometry (1923, 1949)
- Linear ordinary differential equations (1938)
- The differential and integral calculus I, II (1941, 1957) - first Slovak university textbook of mathematics
- Differential Equations I, II (1956–1958) and many scientific papers published in journals.

He lectured at many national and international conferences and symposia. Throughout his scientific and pedagogical career he has been in contact with mathematicians abroad, and collaborated very actively with Czech mathematicians. J. Hronec stressed the importance of teacher's personality in the pedagogical work:

- Mathematics education as a means (Kolozsvár, 1906)
- Personality and teaching (1923)
- Teacher's personality (1926)

Jur Hronec has significant merit in the creation and development of science and technical universities in Slovakia. In the spring of 1936 Jur Hronec was the initiator of "Action for the construction of Slovak universities", where he was elected President at its founding meeting. In autumn 1936 he was the chairman of the Action Committee for the construction of a technical university in Slovakia. This activity has been successful - in June 1937 the National Assembly adopted the law on the establishment of a technical university in Kosice. August 4, 1938 Jur Hronec was fourthelected its first Rector. In 1940 he participated in the establishment of the Slovak University of Natural Sciences and College of Commerce in Bratislava, where he became its first Dean. In 1946 he was the chairman of the Commission for the establishment of the University of Agriculture and Forestry in Kosice. In the same year, he laid the foundation for the Faculty of Education (Dean 1946–1948) in Bratislava.

Jur Hronec devoted great care to the mathematics department of Comenius University in Bratislava, where he was head of department for many years. Other posts and achievements:

- 1953 he became a member of the Slovak Academy of Sciences,
- 1956 he received a PhD,
- 1945–1954 he was chairman of Matica Slovenska,
- 1945 he presided the Artistic and Scientific Council,
- 1946 he became chairman of the Slovak Museum in Bratislava.

He paid great attention to the high school youth. On his initiative and in collaboration with several mathematicians in Slovakia there were various math competitions organized for high school students, which from 1951 were working within the framework of mathematical olympiad. J. Hronec had warm relations since the beginning with the union of mathematicians and physicists. He was the first Slovak Mathematician who corresponded with the Union of Czech Mathematicians and in 1921 became a member. He laid the foundations of action of the union in Slovakia. When in 1956 the Slovak Committee was created, he was elected as its chairman. J. Hronec has great merits in the development of a high level of mathematics in Slovakia, where he mentored nearly two generations of Slovak Mathematicians.

He died at the age of 78 on 1 December 1959 in Bratislava. He is buried in his native village of Gočovo.

== Awards ==
His scientific, educational and organizational work has been acknowledged by several national and scientific awards. Union of Czechoslovak Mathematicians and Physicists in 1959 awarded him the title of "honorary member". It was the first time this title was awarded to their members. In 1962 he was posthumously awarded the Gold Medal of Comenius. In 1971, a room was opened to the public in his home Gočove. In 1981 a plaque was unveiled on the building of the pavilion of Mathematics Faculty of Mathematics, Physics and Informatics at Comenius University in Bratislava, with the inscription "Jur Hronec, Slovak Mathematician, Educator and Humanitarian (1881–1959)".

There are several educational institutions named after him in Slovakia. A well-respected gymnasium in Bratislava was named in his honour. At the Slovak University of Technology a hall of residence is named after him as well an Elementary School in Rožňava.
