= Department of Computer Science, FMPI, Comenius University =

Coordinates: 48°9′9″N 17°4′13″E

The Department of Computer Science (Slovak: Katedra informatiky) is a department of the Faculty of Mathematics, Physics and Informatics at the Comenius University in Bratislava, the capital of Slovakia. It is headed by Prof. RNDr. Branislav Rovan, Phd.

== Educational and scientific achievements ==
The first comprehensive computer science curriculum in Czechoslovakia (now Slovakia) was introduced at the Faculty in 1973. The department, established in 1974, continues to be responsible for organizing the major part of the undergraduate and graduate computer science education to this date. The distinguishing feature of the curriculum has been a balanced coverage of the mathematical foundations, theoretical computer science, and practical computer science. The part of the curriculum covered by the department at present includes courses on computer architecture, system software, networks, databases, software design, design and analysis of algorithms, formal languages, computational complexity, discrete mathematics, cryptology, data security and others.

The department succeeded several times in project applications within the TEMPUS Programme of the EU. The projects CIPRO and „Neumann Network“ helped to build the departmental hardware infrastructure and to establish the expertise in Unix workstation technology, networking, and structured document processing. The CUSTU PARLAB parallel computing laboratory run jointly with the Department of Informatics of the Faculty of Electrical Engineering and Informatics of the Slovak Technical University also resulted from one of these projects. Furthermore, the department participated in project LEARN-ED under the COPERNICUS Programme and built a multimedia laboratory.

The department has been involved in the organization of one of the top European conferences in theoretical computer science ? MFCS ? each time it took place in Slovakia. Further conferences recently organized or co-organized by the department include SOFSEM '98 and DISC '99. Besides, the department houses the secretariat of the European Association for Theoretical Computer Science, of the Slovak Society for Computer Science and of the Association for Security of Information Technologies (ASIT).

== Research topics ==
Research in theoretical computer science and discrete mathematics has the longest tradition in the department. Most notably, the result of Róbert Szelepcsényi on the closure of nondeterministic space under complement, independently obtained also by N. Immerman, brought the Gödel Prize of the ACM and EATCS to both of them in 1995. More recently research in parallel and distributed computing, cryptology and information security, and in software development has been initiated. The department is involved in international cooperation on the development of the structured document editor within the Euromath Project. The department has many international contacts, succeeded in research project application (project ALTEC ? „Algorithms for Future Technologies“) with partners from EU, and also has two research grants from the Slovak Grant Agency.

== Technical equipment ==
A network consisting of 20 workstations (Sun, DEC and Hewlett-Packard in two workstation labs), Parsytec (with 20 transputers and OS Parix), and standard PCs connected to a network.
