= Stop Corruption Foundation =

Non-profit organization in Slovakia

Stop Corruption Foundation (Slovak: Nadácia Zastavme korupciu) is a non-profit organization based in Bratislava, Slovakia. It was founded in 2014. Its nonprofit purpose is to take action against corruption in Slovakia. Its main focus is raising awareness of corruption and possible solutions, to engage the general public in questions of public interest, to help whistleblowers. It supports investigative journalism and promotes systematic measures necessary for an effective fight against corruption.

== History ==
The organization was founded] by Slovak entrepreneurs Miroslav Trnka and Michal Bláha, with the aim of reducing corruption] and its destructive effects on quality of life in Slovakia. A small team is made up of investigative journalists, a lawyer providing support for whistleblowers and young managers of the Stop Corruption community who work to engage and motivate young people in Slovakia to take an interest in public events. Within the scope of the activity they collaborate with law firms and lawyers who assist them in bringing cases to the Office for Public Procurement, the Supreme Audit Office, and represent whistleblowers who turn to them for help.

== Funding ==
The non-profit organization functions mainly with the financial support of Miroslav Trnka, 2% tax donations from the public and part of the finances comes from donations by individuals and companies who wish to contribute to the fight against corruption in Slovakia. All costs and income are disclosed each year in an annual report. In 2018, income of the Foundation amounted to €286,132.02, while Trnka's financial donations represented nearly 84% of the organisation's annual budget.

== Staff ==
=== Founders ===
Miroslav Trnka (born in 1961) is Slovak businessman and philanthropist. He graduated the Slovak University of Technology in Trnava (Slovakia) in Automated management systems. In 1987, together with Peter Paško discovered one of the world’s first computer viruses and developed an antivirus code for its detection. After the fall of the communist regime in Czechoslovakia, they established a cybersecurity firm Eset, which is now operating in more than 200 countries and territories.

Michal Bláha (born in 1964) is also Slovak businessman and former member of the Czechoslovak Federal Assembly. He graduated from the Slovak University of Technology in Bratislava (Slovakia) in Architecture. In the final year of the studies, he got involved in the revolutionary political anti-communist movement Public Against Violence, which he later, after the 1990 Czech legislative election, represented in the Federal Assembly. After the disintegration of Czechoslovakia and loss of his mandate in the Assembly, Blaha founded an advertising company MARK BBDO in Bratislava.

=== Directors ===
Zuzana Petková is director of Stop Corruption Foundation. She is also former investigative journalist and reporter, who worked in a number of Slovak broadsheet newspapers, including SME, Trend and Hospodárske noviny, and has been the managing director of Stop Corruption Foundation since August 2018. She holds a degree in journalism from Comenius University in Bratislava.

In her career as a journalist she uncovered several corruption scandals, and three times was awarded the National Journalism Award. In 2019, she received the US Embassy's "Woman of Courage" Award, for her “unflinching resolve to inform the Slovak public about corruption and take steps to combat”.

Pavel Sibyla is a former director of the Stop Corruption Foundation. He is a former journalist and writer, who had worked in several broadsheet newspapers before becoming a managing director of the Foundation. As a reporter for a weekly business magazine TREND, Sybila alongside his co-worker wrote a winning article of the national round of the European Annual Journalist Award 2010. In 2013, he founded a non-governmental journalist platform, which focuses on covering interesting and resonating topics in a society. In the period from 2014 to 2015, he was the head of the Internal Affairs section in the Office of the former President of the Slovak republic Andrej Kiska. In 2018 he entered politics.

== Activities ==
- Change of law: The foundation co-initiated the creation of a new law on whistleblowing or the law against shell companies. A law the foundation has helped create covers nearly all forms of business conducted between the state and other parties, thus significantly increasing transaction costs for potential frauds looking to bypass it.
- Help for whistleblowers: Foundation provides free legal support for whistleblowers, who report criminal or dishonest conduct harmful to society and they lost their job because of it, and represents those people] in court.
- Investigative journalism: Small investigative team tries to reveal or cancelled tailor-made state contracts, which are one of the main channels] through which Slovakia has lost millions of euros each year. For example, the foundation produced the first report on the state of Slovak police. Over a period of several months in 2018, police officers of various ranks and from different cities were consulted to get an idea of the inner workings of the police force. It was the first report of its kind in Slovakia.

The foundation also launched its own investigative online programme, which monitors cases where laws are violated and power is abused. Another activity is the foundation's website that monitors how EU Structural Funds and Cohesion Fund are spent in Slovakia.

- Education and awareness: the Foundation works to mobilise civil society and promote interest in public affairs. Foundation established Community Stop Corruption, a space for young anti-corruption volunteers. It organizes electoral groups of citizens, to monitor for electoral fraud during the local elections in 2018. Foundation also work with various schools on an informal education programme and organize different types of events.
