= Comenius University, Faculty of Natural Sciences =

Faculty of the Slovak university in Bratislava

Coordinates: 48°09′00″N 17°04′18″E

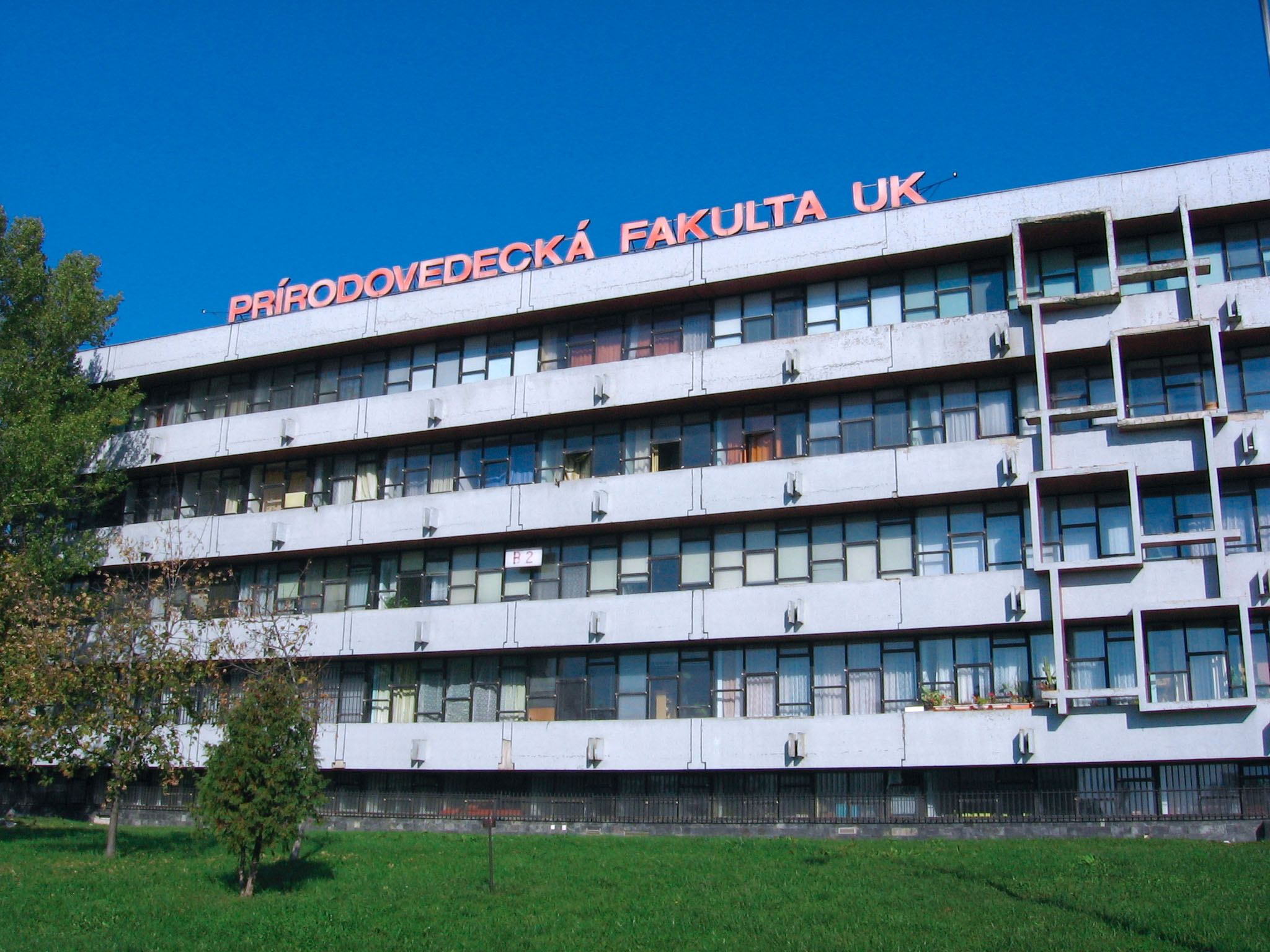
One of pavilions of the complex of the Faculty of Natural Sciences

The Faculty of Natural Sciences (FNS) (Slovak: Prírodovedecká Fakulta (PriF UK)) is a faculty of the Comenius University in Bratislava.

== History ==
Efforts to establish the Faculty of Natural Sciences in Slovakia during the interwar period were not successful. After split of the Czechoslovakia into the Protectorate of Bohemia and Moravia and the Slovak Republic and disposal of Czech higher education, Slovak students had no more science colleges available. The Natural Sciences Faculty of Slovak University (former name of Comenius University in Bratislava) was founded in 1940 and education in the first semester started in autumn 1940/1941. Faculty become independent from the Faculty philosophy of the then Slovak University, where some science subjects were previously taught. The first Dean was the František Valentin. From the beginning it consisted of Botanical and Geographical institute, the institute also Zoology and Comparative Anatomy. Several subjects as mathematics, physics and chemistry, were taught in the lecture hall of Slovak technical college. In the 1941 Geological Institute was added. A year later Mineralogical and Petrographic Institute was established. Both working in makeshift conditions without sufficient qualified staff. In the winter semester of 1942/1943 Institute of Nuclear Physics was added to the faculty and in 1944, Astronomical Institute and Institute of Mathematics were established. Only science without a separate department until 1948 was the chemistry. In the 1950 former institutes were organized into the departments. In 1980, Faculty of Mathematics, Physics and Informatics was separated from the Natural Sciences Faculty.

== Campus ==
Individual departments were formerly housed in several buildings in the center of Bratislava. From 1960s to 1987 five pavilion complex was built in the Mlynská Dolina Valley in the Bratislava for purposes of the Faculty. Apart from them, faculty has buildings of the Botanical garden, Department of Botany and a Biological research station at Šúr.

== Sections ==
The Natural Sciences faculty is divided up into the following sections:

=== Biological section ===
- Department of Animal Physiology and Ethology
- Department of Anthropology
- Department of Botany
- Department of Ecology
- Department of Genetics
- Department of Microbiology and Virology
- Department of Molecular Biology
- Department of Plant Physiology
- Department of Zoology
- Institute of Cell Biology

=== Chemical section ===
- Department of Analytical Chemistry
- Department of Biochemistry
- Department of Inorganic Chemistry
- Department of Nuclear Chemistry
- Department of Organic Chemistry
- Department of Physical and Theoretical Chemistry
- Institute of Chemistry

=== Environmental section ===
- Department of Nature Conservation
- Department of Geochemistry
- Department of Landscape Ecology
- Department of Soil Science

=== Geographical section ===
- Department of Cartography, Geoinformatics and Remote Sensing
- Department of Human Geography and Demogeography
- Department of Physical Geography and Geoecology
- Department of Regional Geography, Protection and Planning of the Landscape

=== Geological section ===
- Department of Applied and Environmental Geophysics
- Department of Geology and Paleontology
- Department of Geology of Mineral Deposits
- Department of Hydrogeology
- Department of Engineering Geology
- Department of Mineralogy and Petrology
- Institute of Laboratory Research on Geomaterials

=== Other sections ===
- Department of Didactics in Science, Psychology and Pedagogy
- Department of Languages
- Department of Physical Education
- Central Computing Centre

== See also ==
- Comenius University
