= Gymnasium Jur Hronec =

Coordinates: 48.1460°N 17.1338°E

Spojená škola Novohradská - ZŠ Košická, Gymnázium Jura Hronca

Location
- Bratislava; Slovakia

Information
- Established: 1959
- Headmaster: Renáta Karácsonyová
- Staff: approx. 100
- Gender: Mixed
- Enrolment: approx. 1200
- Language: English; Slovak
- Website: http://www.gjh.sk

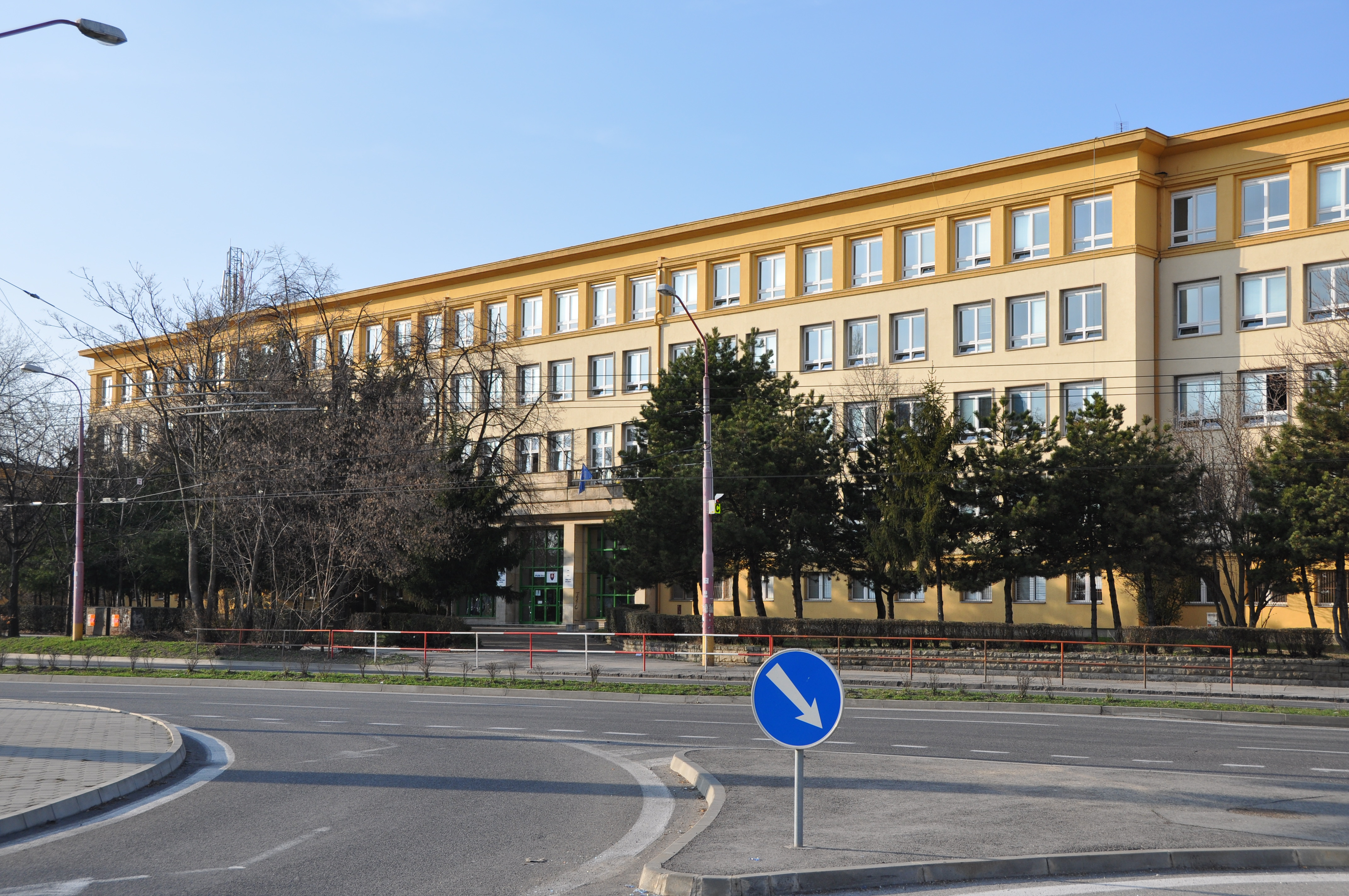
The Gymnasium in 2010

Gymnázium Jura Hronca (GJH) is a gymnasium (grammar school) in Bratislava, Slovakia.

The school focuses on the study of natural sciences, mathematics, and computer sciences. However, its affiliation with the International Baccalaureate, an active bi-lingual (English – Slovak) programme and the option to study several foreign languages such as French and German, the school has a strong reputation for the study of foreign languages.

In the school year 2005/2006, GJH launched lower programs of IB Primary Years Programme and IB Middle Years Programme.

The school has been recently known as the "Spojená škola Gymnázium Jura Hronca a ZŠ Košická" (United school of the Gymnázium Jura Hronca and the Košická Primary School) after a merge with the primary school Základná škola a osemročné gymnázium Košická sharing the same building.

== History ==
The school was founded on January 9, 1959, as an 11-year secondary school. In the school year 1969/70 the school was granted the status of a Gymnasium, named after the Slovak mathematician Jur Hronec.

In 1997 the school donated the head of a mummified Egyptian man to the Slovak National Museum.
