= Faculty of Informatics and Information Technologies =

Coordinates: 48°09′14″N 17°04′18″E

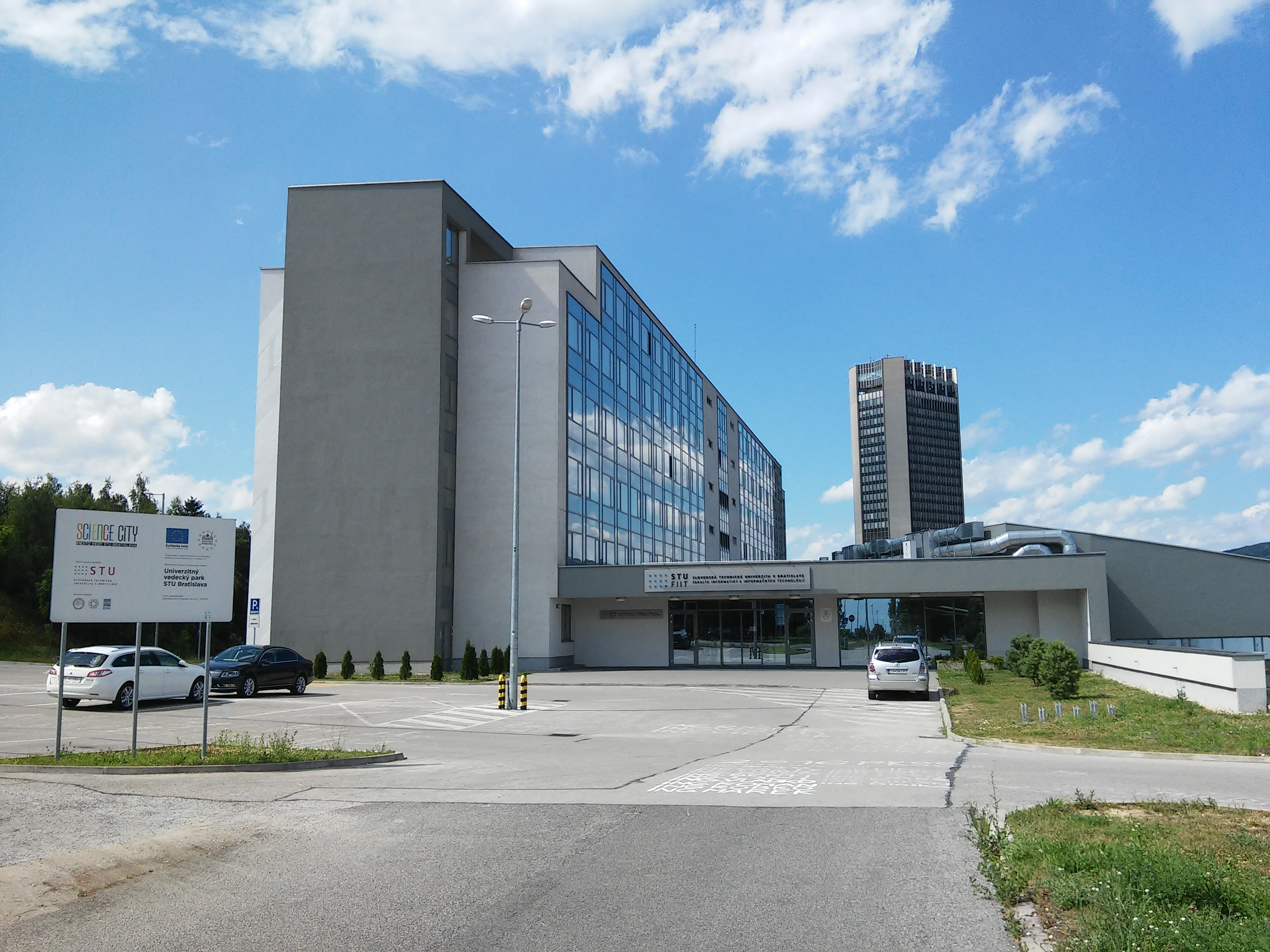
Faculty of Informatics and Information Technologies building

The Faculty of Informatics and Information Technology (Slovak: Fakulta informatiky a informačných technológií) is one of the faculties of the Slovak University of Technology in Bratislava in Bratislava, the capital of Slovakia.

The Faculty was created in 2003 by separating from the Faculty of Electrical Engineering and Information Technology. It provides university education in computer science and computer engineering. After three years of study, the students can attain the Bachelor's degree and after two more years the Master of Science degree. The Faculty also offers three-year doctoral study.

All of the study programs have Slovak accreditation as well as the international accreditation from Engineering Council of United Kingdom.

In Shanghai ranking 2012 Slovak University of Technology has reached 100-150 position in informatics in the world, as the only University in Central Europe evaluated in the first 200.

== Institutes ==
- Institute of Applied Informatics
- Institute of Informatics and Software Engineering
- Institute of Computer Systems and Networks

== Accredited study programs ==
Bachelor's degree study programmes 3 years full-time study

- Informatics
- Computer and Communication Systems and Networks

master's degree study programmes 2 years full-time study, 3 years full-time study (for students who graduated in a different field)

- Computer and Communication Systems and Networks (as an orientation in Computer Engineering)
- Software Engineering
- Information Systems

Doctoral degree study programmes 3 years full-time study, 5 years part-time study

- Software Systems (as an orientation in Software Engineering)
- Applied Informatics

== Research ==
The economical and social development is featured by an exponential growth of new scientific knowledge today. Informatics and Information Technology (IIT) are playing the key role. They boost the development of all scientific branches, with the creation of new methodological base to make research and development. The development time decreases, the traditional theoretical and experimental abilities are extended broadly, and so on. Informatics has developed to be an autonomous scientific area, which supports the success not only in the branch of information technologies, but has wide consequences to the lives of individuals and society.

It is not a coincidence only that the research in IIT area has become the one research topic among the priority research topics of European Union. This is indicated by the 5th and 6th European Framework Programme and their priorities including IIT. The importance and consequences of IIT research can be demonstrated by their clear support in USA and Japan. This contributes too to the support of IIT in European Union. The example from European Union (which is the most important example for us) shows

the emphasis that the support of IIT research is continual for a long time with perspective to the future (compare the priorities of 4th, 5th and 6th Framework Programme); that the IIT research is extending to various research areas.
