= Slovak University of Technology in Bratislava =

Technical university in Bratislava, Slovakia

Coordinates: 48°09′17″N 17°07′03″E

Slovak University of Technology, Bratislava
- Slovenská technická univerzita v Bratislave
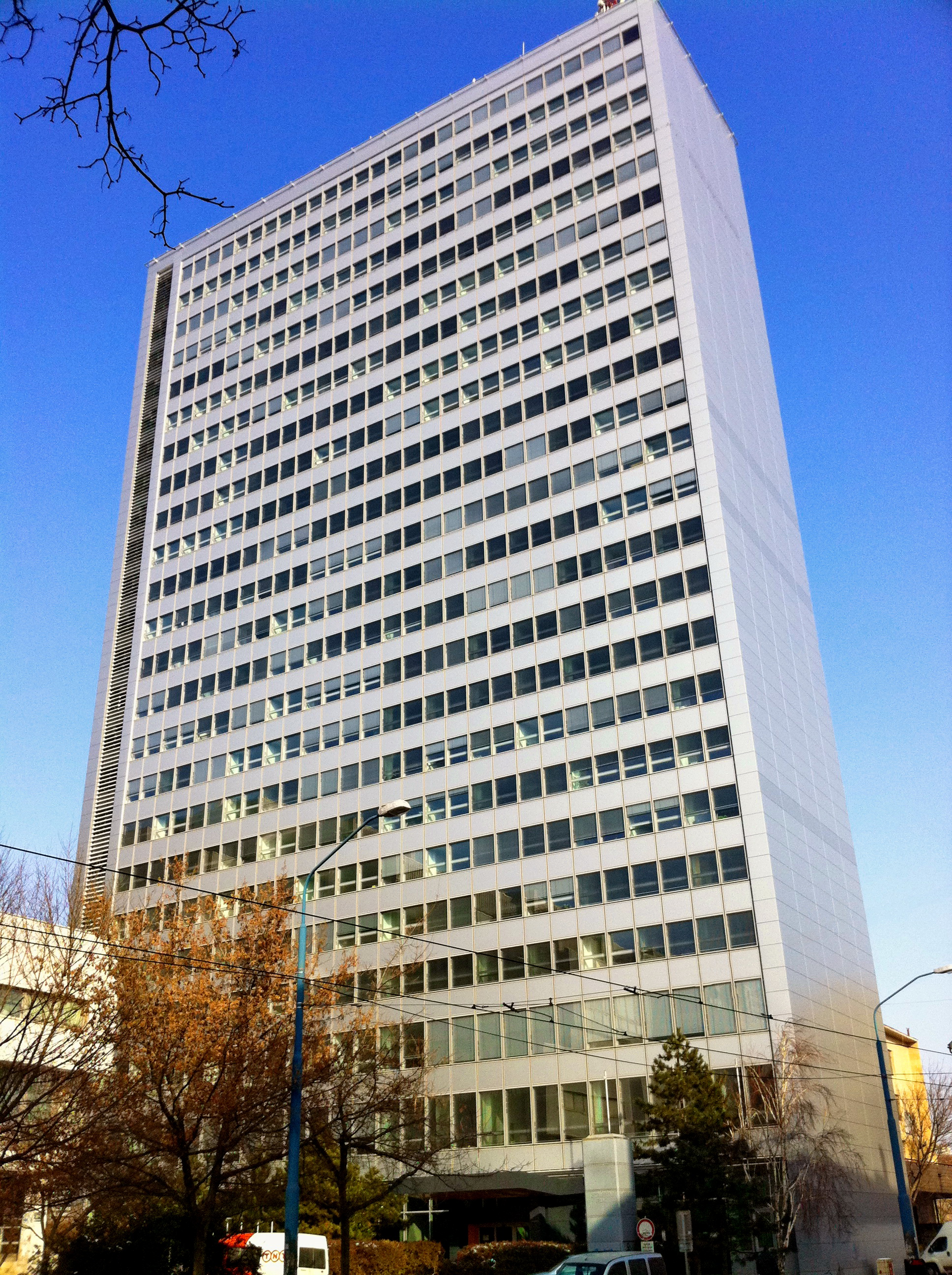
- Highrise of the Faculty of Civil Engineering
- Type: Public
- Established: 1937
- Affiliations: ERASMUS
- Rector: Maximilián Strémy
- Students: 11,700 (2025/2026)
- Location: Vazovova 5, 812 43 Bratislava 1, Slovak Republic, Europe, Bratislava, Slovak Republic
- Nickname: STU
- Website: www.stuba.sk

University rankings

Regional – Overall
- QS Emerging Europe and Central Asia: 65 (2022)

Slovak University of Technology in Bratislava (STU) (Slovak: Slovenská technická univerzita v Bratislave) is the biggest and oldest university of technology in Slovakia. In the 2012 Academic Ranking of World Universities it was ranked in the first 150 in Computer Science, the only university in central Europe in the first 200. However, it lost this position in the two following years.

The university holds the ECTS Label and DS (diploma supplement) Label. Oliver Moravčík was appointed rector on 7 September 2021.

== University structure ==
- Faculty of Civil Engineering
- Faculty of Mechanical Engineering
- Faculty of Electrical Engineering and Information Technology
- Faculty of Chemical and Food Technology
- Faculty of Architecture and Design
- Faculty of Materials Science and Technology (in Trnava)
- Faculty of Informatics and Information Technologies
- Institute of Management
- Institute of Engineering Studies

== European Alliance for Innovation ==
The Slovak University of Technology in Bratislava signed a Memorandum of Understanding with the European Alliance for Innovation on 3 May 2013. The signators were the president of the European Alliance for Innovation, professor Imrich Chlamtac and the rector of the Slovak University of Technology in Bratislava, Robert Redhammer.

The purpose of this cooperation is to help innovation made in the STU to reach the market, as well as create a base of operations for EAI in Central Europe.

== See also ==
- ESDP-Network
