= Demands of the Slovak Nation =

1848 manifesto by Slovak nationalists

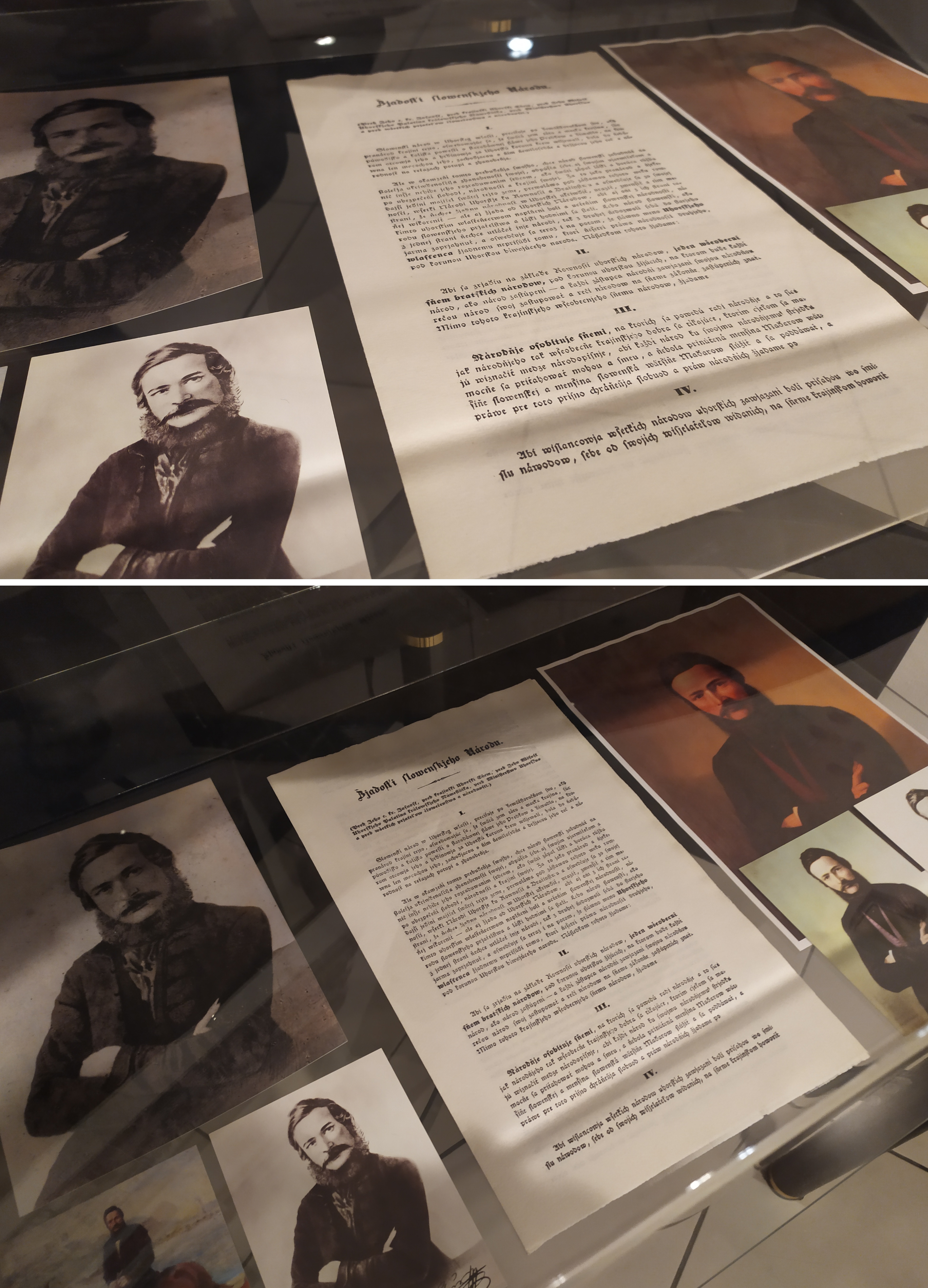
Demands of the Slovak Nation in Slovak Matica, Bratislava

The Demands of the Slovak Nation (Slovak: Žiadosti slovenského národa) was a manifesto issued by Slovak nationalists during the revolutions of 1848 in the Habsburg areas. It was prompted by the nationalists' realisation that the Hungarian government would not heed the calls of Ľudovít Štúr for the establishment of public regional assemblies and the acceptance of a Slovak petition at a national assembly.

On 10 May 1848, thirty members of Štúr's circle of nationalist activists met in Liptószentmiklós (now Liptovský Mikuláš), at the initiative of Štefan Marko Daxner and Ján Francisci. They drew up a list of fourteen demands which included:

- Equality and fraternal coexistence of all peoples in Hungary;
- Transformation of Hungary into a decentralised state consisting of equal nations, each with its own parliament and equal representation in the Diet of Hungary;
- Adoption of the Slovak language as an official language in government offices and schools in the Slovak lands;
- Official recognition of Slovak symbols (colours and a national flag);
- Establishment of a Slovak national guard;
- Introduction of full voting rights for all adult citizens;
- Abolition of laws limiting the freedoms of the press, of assembly and of association;
- Reformation of land ownership by restoring the land that had been seized from the peasants by the Hungarian aristocracy.

The nationalists rejected the way that Hungary was run as a centralised state under ethnic Hungarian supremacy and sought to establish Slovak autonomy within a reformed state. Some of their demands, such as their call for universal manhood suffrage, were unusually radical for their era and location.

The demands were the first public call to make the area then known as Upper Hungary (most of which is now modern Slovakia) a distinct political entity. They were proclaimed on 11 May but were poorly received. The assembly at which they were issued was ill-attended and before they could be delivered to Ferdinand I, the King of Hungary and Emperor of Austria, the Hungarian government declared that the demands were an illegal, unconstitutional and pan-Slavic act.

Štúr and his associates Jozef Miloslav Hurban and Michal Miloslav Hodža were targeted with arrest warrants issued the day after the proclamation was issued. Several of those involved with the proclamation were imprisoned and the government declared martial law in Upper Hungary. Štúr, Hurban and Hodža subsequently adopted a more radical approach; a few months later they established the Slovak National Council and launched an armed rebellion against the Hungarian government.
