= EGT =

EGT may refer to:

== Organisations ==
- Lutheran Gymnasium Tisovec (Slovak: Evanjelické Gymnázium Tisovec), a school in Slovakia
- Emergent Game Technologies, developer of the Gamebryo video game engine

== Science and technology ==
- Evolutionary game theory
- Evolutionary Governance Theory
- Exhaust gas temperature
- Endosymbiotic gene transfer, a type of horizontal gene transfer

== Sport ==
- FIA Electric GT Championship, a planned electric car racing series

== Transport ==
- Eaglemont railway station, Victoria, Australia
- Egton railway station, England
- Wellington Municipal Airport, Kansas, United States
