= Palisády Street =

Street in Bratislava, Slovakia

Coordinates: 48°8′47″N 17°5′58″E

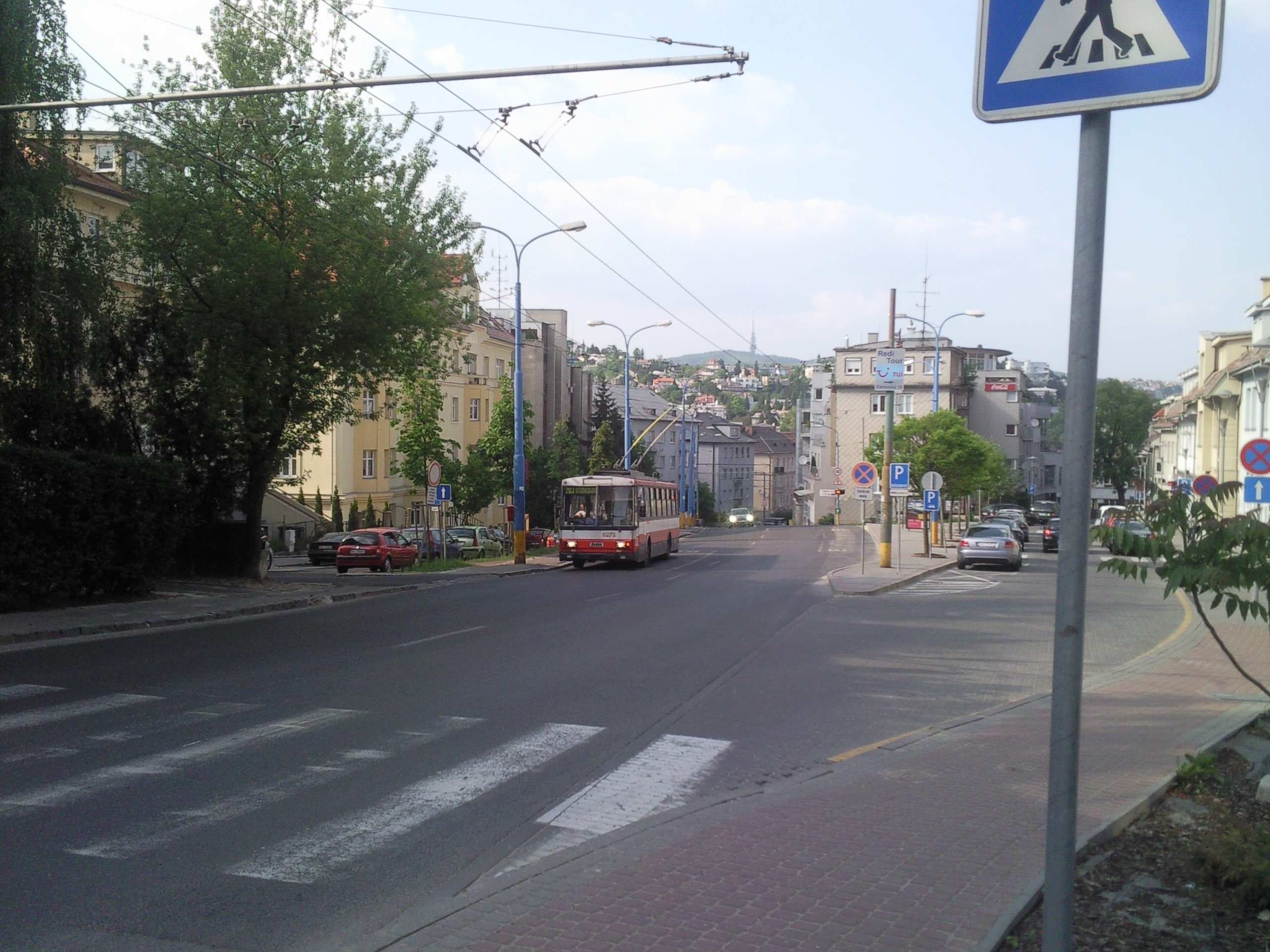
- Looking down Palisády Street in Bratislava, Slovakia.
- Interactive map of Palisády Street
- Namesake: Palisades (wooden fortifications)
- Location: Bratislava, Slovakia
- South end: Hodžovo námestie
- North end: Bratislava Castle

Other
- Known for: Historic mansions, diplomatic residences, access to Bratislava Castle

Palisády Street (Slovak: Palisády) is a major street in Bratislava's Old Town connecting Hodžovo námestie and Bratislava Castle in the Slovakia's capital. The street is served by public transport trolleybusses. Near the Bratislava Castle and National Council of the Slovak Republic building it bends sharply and continues as Mudroňova Street, together forming the main passageway through the western part of the Bratislava Old Town.

== Bratislava tree ==
There is an old Linden tree located at Palisády Street no. 12 - 14., which survived several centuries. It is probably a survivor of one of the famous renaissance gardens that used to be in this area. There is a copperplate from A. Kaltschmied from 1735, according to a geometer Mikovíny, providing historical evidence of the widespread linden trees in the area of contemporary "Palisades". On the plan from 1768 there is a dominant tree marked in the garden of baron Jesenák, it is mentioned also by M. Korabinský in his publication on Bratislava from 1781.

The tree raised attention of the Slovak revival generation. The tree represented a symbol to so called Ľudovít Štúr - movements - the linden is considered to be a symbol of Slavs. In this period, lindens were popular trees all over Europe. Lindens are subject of making gardens and tree alleys (for example "Unten den Linden" (Under the lindens) in Berlin). Later, the garden of baron Jesenák became the ownership of a spirit producing entrepreneur, Slubek. In 1865, the members of the general meeting of the Austrian Monarchy Doctor Association and Scientists admired the most spectacular sightseeing of the city and one of the most attractive natural objects of the whole Austrian Monarchy. According to historian Ortvay, these specialists estimated the tree's age to be one thousand years. In the 19th century, the tree had a perimeter at the root of 11 metres and at chest height of 8 metres, whereas one of the side twigs was 4 metres.

In the 20th century, during the construction boom in Bratislava, the area of the linden tree was endangered. In 1982, the tree was proclaimed to be a preserved tree. The area was protected by fencing, which enabled huge boughs to grow. Today the holes in the tree are the evidence of it. The linden tree however deprecated and today survived just as a remainder. In the 1990s, its protection was cancelled. In 2003, the tree was designated as the Tree - the Hero of the year 2003. The Bratislava tree is being referred to as the "Palffy´s tree" because it was displayed so in one masterpiece from 18th century. Referring to existing historical documents, the tree can be proven to be at least 236 years old. The tree could be even older because no data is kept to prove whether the tree was not in the past a tree connected and being part of "Prepost" gardens and maybe even the remainder of the original primeval forests of the Small Carpathian Mountains.

== Access ==
The street is 5 minutes walking distance from the edge of the historical city centre of Bratislava. It is currently served by trolleybuses no. 203, no. 207, no. 208, auxiliary mini-bus line no. 147 and night trolleybus no. 47.

== Gallery ==
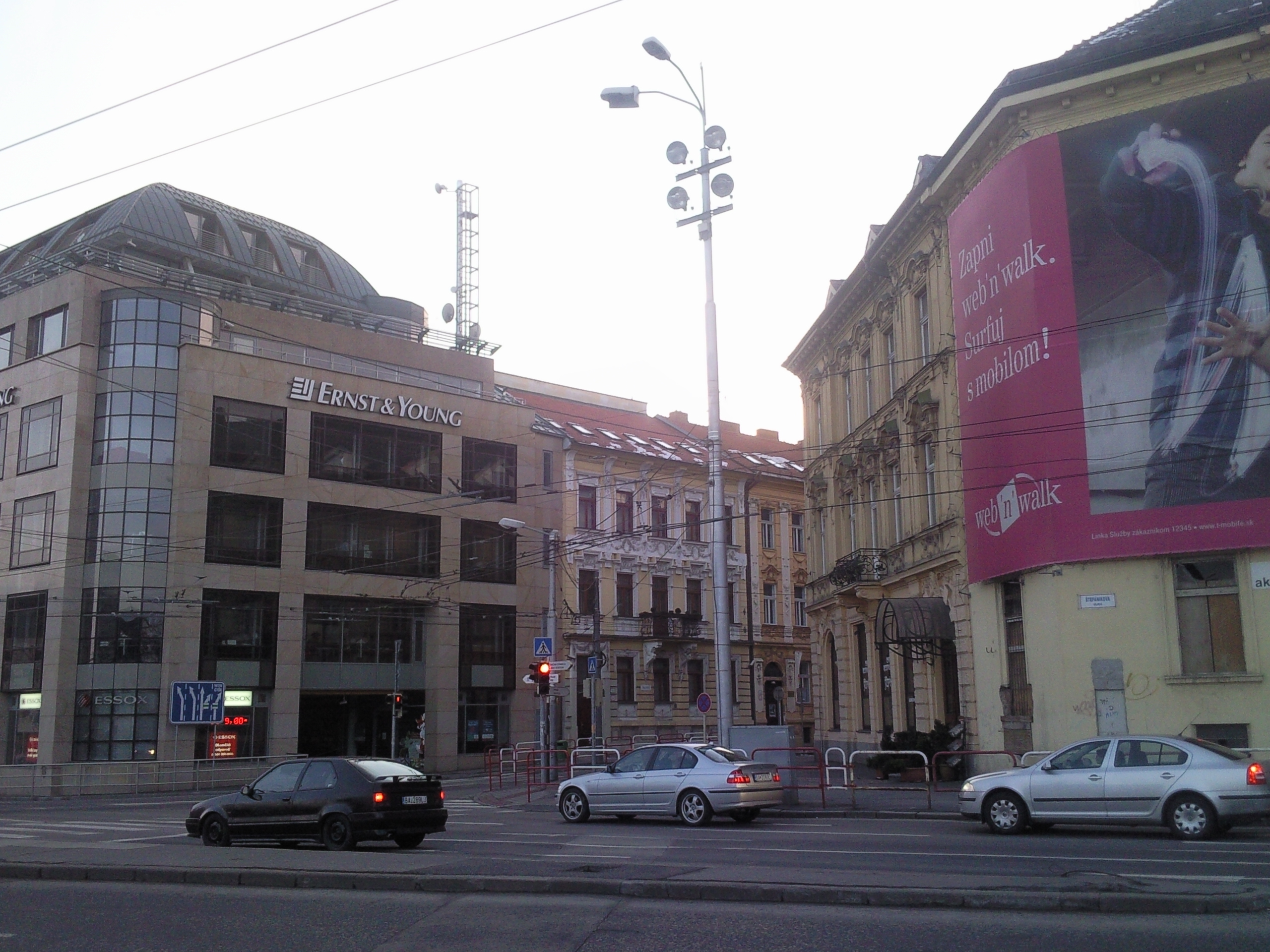
Mouth of Palisády Street at Hodžovo námestie.

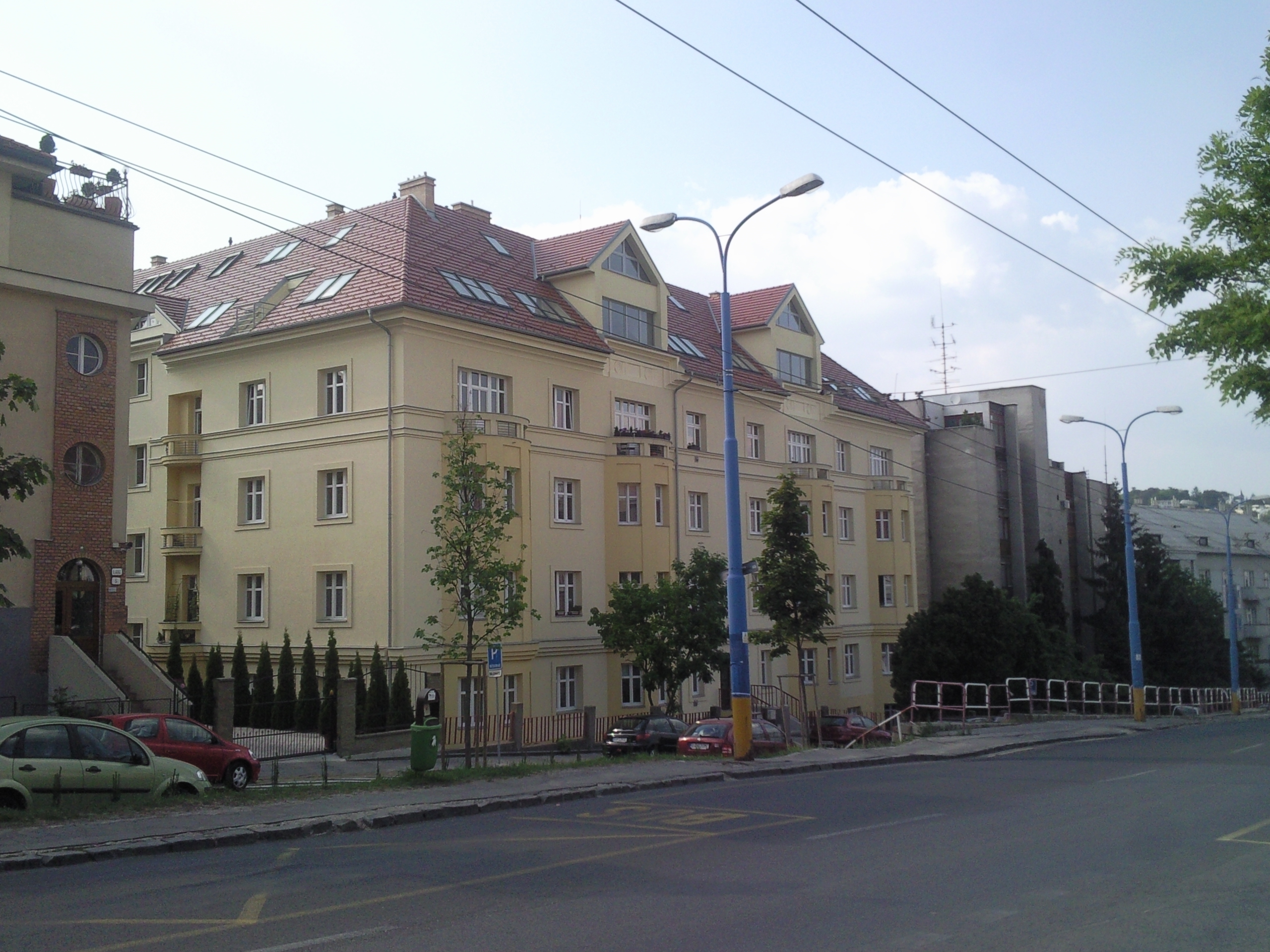
A building at Palisády Street.

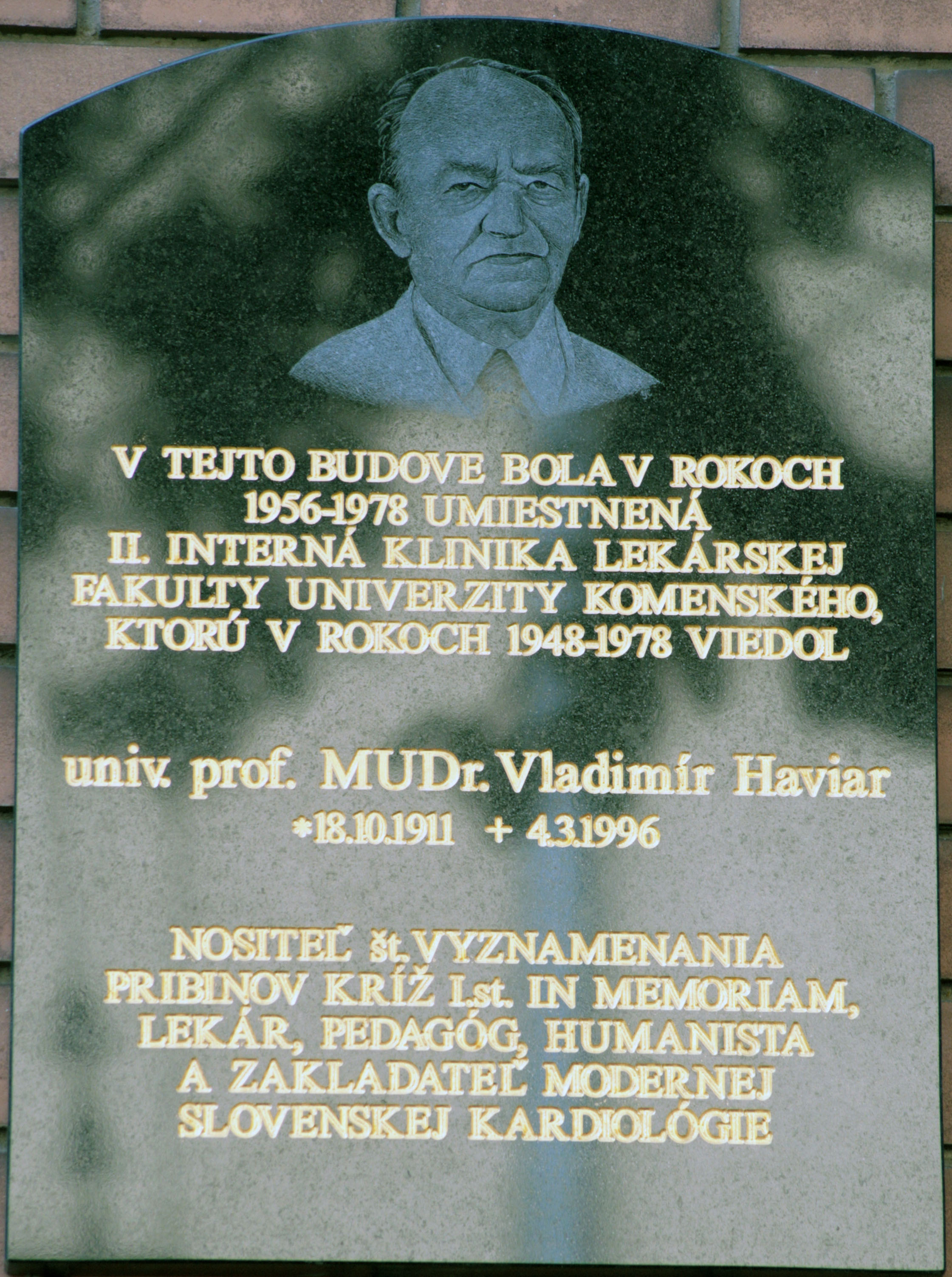
Memoniral table on a building at Palisády Street.

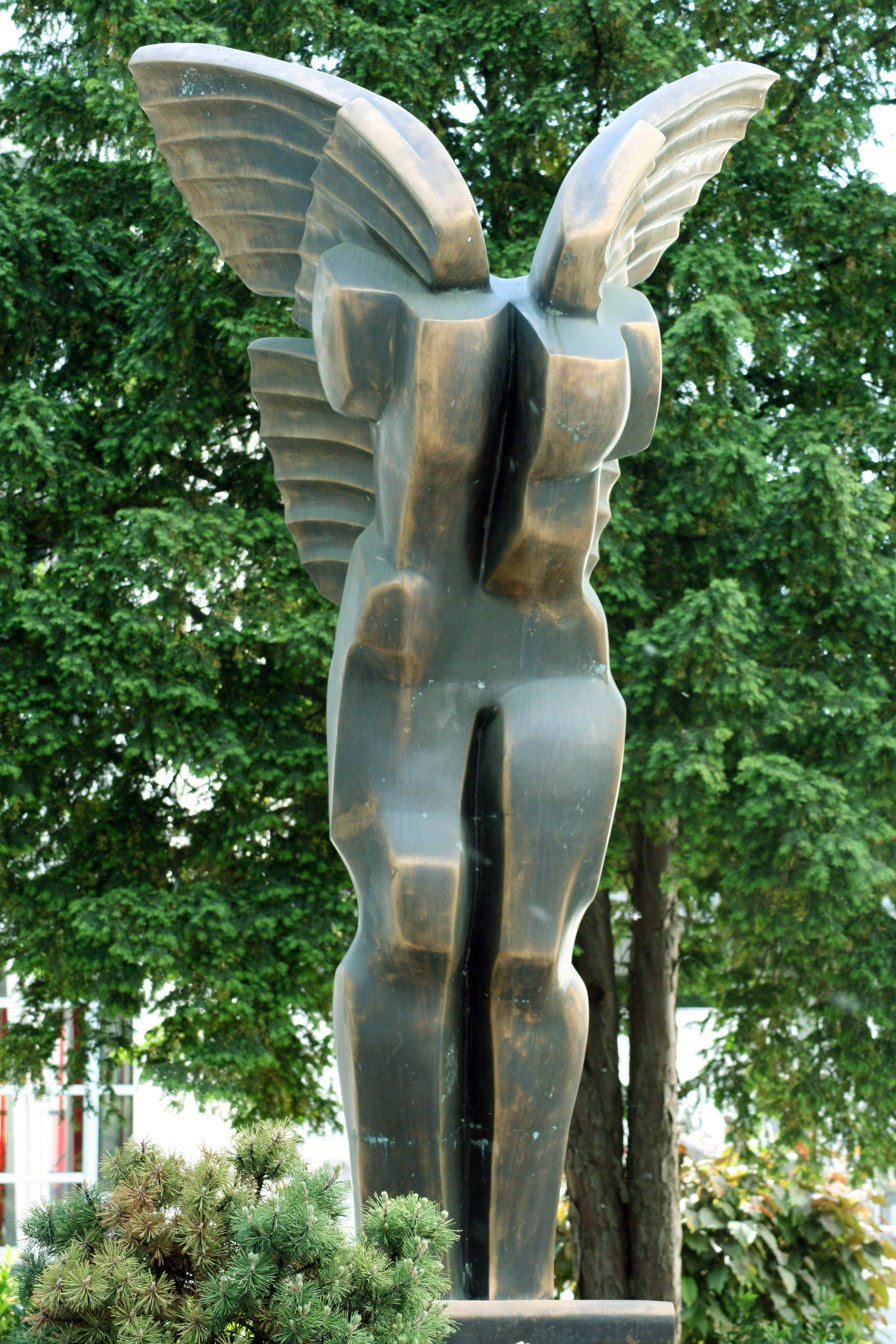
A statue at Palisády Street.
