= Slovak Revolt =

Slovak revolt may refer to a number of revolts in Slovakia:

- Slovak Uprising of 1848–49 (1848–1849)
- Slovak National Uprising (1944)
- Gentle Revolution (1989)
