= Slovak Uprising =

Slovak Uprising may refer to:

- Slovak Volunteer Campaigns, or the Slovak uprising of 1848–1849
- Slovak National Uprising, in 1944
