= Tisovec =

Tisovec Tiszolc
- Municipality
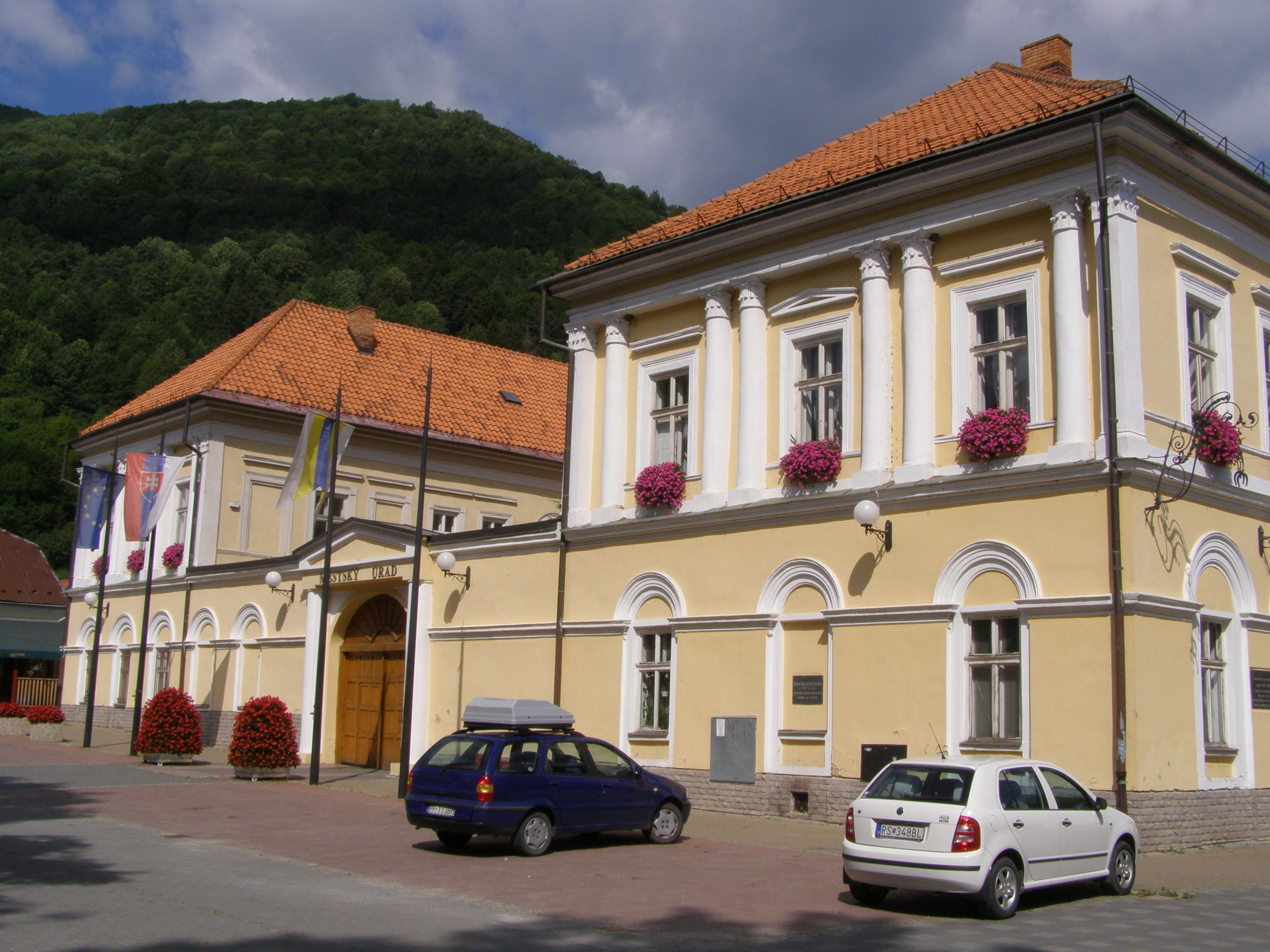
- Building of municipality office in Tisovec

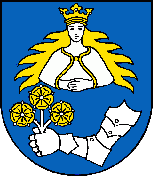
- Flag Coat of arms

- Location of Tisovec in the Banská Bystrica Region Location of Tisovec in Slovakia
- Coordinates: 48.68°N 19.95°E
- Country: Slovakia
- Region: Banská Bystrica Region
- District: Rimavská Sobota District
- First mentioned: 1334

Government
  - Mayor: Irena Milecová

Area
  - Total: 123.42 km^{2} (47.65 sq mi)
- Elevation: 378 m (1,240 ft)

Population (2025)
  - Total: 3,533
- Time zone: UTC+1 (CET)
  - Summer (DST): UTC+2 (CEST)
- Postal code: 980 61
- Area code: +421 47
- Vehicle registration plate (until 2022): RS
- Website: www.tisovec.com

Tisovec (Hungarian: Tiszolc, German: Theissholz or Theissholcz, Latin: Taxovia) is a town in central Slovakia. Its population was around 3,648 in the latest census held in 2021.

== Geography ==
The municipality lies at an altitude of 378 metres (1,240 ft) and covers an area of 123.42 km^{2} (47.65 sq mi) (2025).

== Location and landscape ==
Tisovec is situated in the valley of the river Rimava, at the foot of the Muránska planina plateau. The landscape there gives the impression of a small town in the mountains. Some other towns close to it are Brezno, Hnúšťa and Revúca.

== History ==
The first settlement in the area dates all the way to the Bronze Age, and was located in Hradová in Tisovec. The first written evidence of the town comes from the year 1334 during the reign of King Charles I of Hungary as Tizolc.

The name "Tisovec" comes from the yew tree (in Hungarian "tiszafa", in Slovak "tis"), which can be found in the hills around the town. Tisovec received its charter as a town at the end of the 15th century. The development of the town was halted by raids of the Ottoman Turks in the 16th and 17th centuries. The town's renaissance came in 1780, when Maria Theresia renewed its market privileges.

== Population ==
Historical population
| Year | Pop. | ±% |
|---|---|---|
| 1970 | 4,615 | — |
| 1980 | 4,843 | +4.9% |
| 1991 | 4,430 | −8.5% |
| 2001 | 4,215 | −4.9% |
| 2011 | 4,306 | +2.2% |
| 2021 | 3,720 | −13.6% |
Source: Censuses

Population statistic (10 years)
| Year | 1995 | 2005 | 2015 | 2025 |
|---|---|---|---|---|
| Count | 4286 | 4092 | 4195 | 3533 |
| Difference | | −4.52% | +2.51% | −15.78% |

Population statistic
| Year | 2024 | 2025 |
|---|---|---|
| Count | 3587 | 3533 |
| Difference | | −1.50% |

It has a population of 3533 people (31 December 2025).

=== Ethnicity ===
Census 2021 (1+ %)
| Ethnicity | Number | Fraction |
|---|---|---|
| Slovak | 3595 | 96.63% |
| Romani | 250 | 6.72% |
| Not found out | 113 | 3.03% |
| Total | 3720 | |

In year 2021 was 3720 people by ethnicity 3595 as Slovak, 250 as Romani, 113 as Not found out, 23 as Czech, 19 as Hungarian, 6 as Other, 5 as English, 3 as Polish, 2 as Canadian, 1 as Serbian, 1 as Rusyn, 1 as Russian and 1 as German.

Note on population: The difference values of population numbers in the table "Population statistic" and in the sections "Ethnicity" & "Religion" is caused by the use of various statistical methods.

=== Religion ===
Census 2021 (1+ %)
| Religion | Number | Fraction |
|---|---|---|
| None | 1728 | 46.45% |
| Evangelical Church | 789 | 21.21% |
| Roman Catholic Church | 759 | 20.4% |
| Not found out | 323 | 8.68% |
| Total | 3720 | |

In year 2021 was 3720 people by religion 1728 from None, 789 from Evangelical Church, 759 from Roman Catholic Church, 323 from Not found out, 28 from Greek Catholic Church, 21 from Other and not ascertained christian church, 12 from United Methodist Church, 12 from Ad hoc movements, 10 from Other, 8 from Jehovah's Witnesses, 8 from Baptists Church, 4 from Calvinist Church, 4 from Buddhism, 3 from Paganism and natural spirituality, 3 from Christian Congregations in Slovakia, 3 from Seventh-day Adventist Church, 2 from Old Catholic Church, 2 from Eastern Orthodox Church and 1 from Church of the Brethren.

== Economy ==
Nowadays, there are two major employers in the town.

The Calmit company owns the local mine and produces lime. History of the mine goes all the way back to 1870.

CSM Tisovec is a machine building company with 530 employees and annual turnover of 0.5 billion Korunas. The company produces special extensions for trucks which enable them to work in severe conditions or build on the number of jobs that a particular truck can do. The company exports its products to several countries.

A Paper mill and the clothing industry have had a history in the town as well, although they are dying out due to globalization.

The town has touristic potential for its proximity to Muránska planina mountain karst. Also, the mineral water spring is worth mentioning.

== Education ==
Besides the Vladimír Clementis Elementary School, there are two secondary education schools in Tisovec. An "industrial school" (technical college) founded in 1953 is able to board more students than it currently does. The Lutheran Gymnasium Tisovec, founded in 1992, The Lutheran Gymnasium is perceived to be among the better high schools in Slovakia. It is mostly a boarding school and has approximately 300 students.

== Twin towns — sister cities ==
Tisovec is twinned with:

- Putnok, Hungary
- Ludgeřovice, Czech Republic
- Nowy Żmigród, Poland
- Shenandoah, Iowa, United States

== Famous people ==
- Vladimír Clementis (1902–1952), Communist journalist, politician and a founder of the magazine DAV. Clementis was sentenced to death by Communists as a part of the cleansing in the bloody 1950s.
- Pavol Jozeffy (1775–1848), was a leading personality in the Gemer area during the revolution era of 1848–1849 and later. He was a town priest and became a bishop in 1823. He also defended Ľudovít Štúr in his fight to sustain a department of Slovak language and literature at the Evangelical lycee in Bratislava.
- Štefan Marko Daxner, politician and lawyer, one of the most significant persons in 19th-century Slovak history.
- Terézia Vansová, a writer from the era of realism. She lived in Tisovec for more than 30 years and wrote some of her important pieces there. She also propagated women's emancipation.
- Ladislav Záborský (1921–2016), a painter, book illustrator, and church artist (stained glass windows in 25 churches and 21 "Stations of the Cross") was born in Tisovec; due to his Christian activities became a political prisoner and lived in Martin.
- In 1715, the famous outlaw, Jakub Surovec, was born in Tisovec.

Tim Flakoll, Senator from North Dakota was among the volunteers who helped remodel and build the Christian Gymnasium in the early 1990s.
