= Peter Michal Bohúň =

Slovak painter (1822–1879)

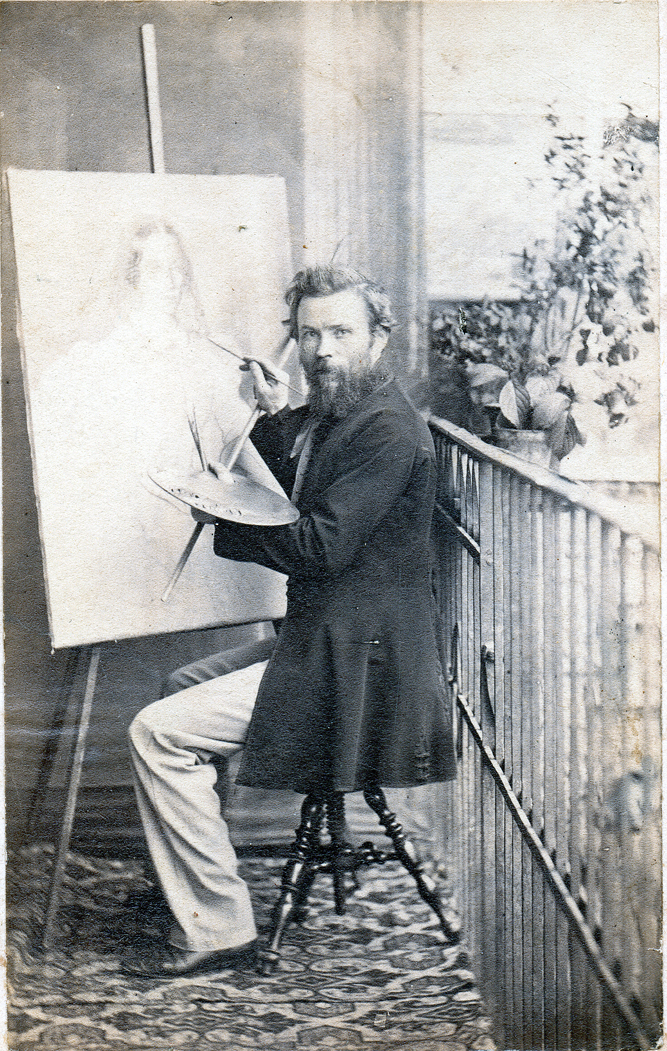
Peter Michal Bohúň (c.1860)

Peter Michal Bohúň (29 September 1822 – 20 May 1879) was a Slovak painter, primarily of portraits, although he also did landscapes and altarpieces.

== Biography ==
He was born in Veličná. His father was a Lutheran minister. He went to the public schools of his village, then attended the gymnasium in Gemerská Hôrka. In 1836, he was enrolled at the evangelical seminary in Levoča. It was there that he first came in contact with the idea of Slovak independence, a cause which he enthusiastically embraced, earning himself the nickname "Slavomil". Due to political unrest, the Hungarian government closed the seminary in 1841, so he moved to Kežmarok, where he studied law and began to paint as a hobby.

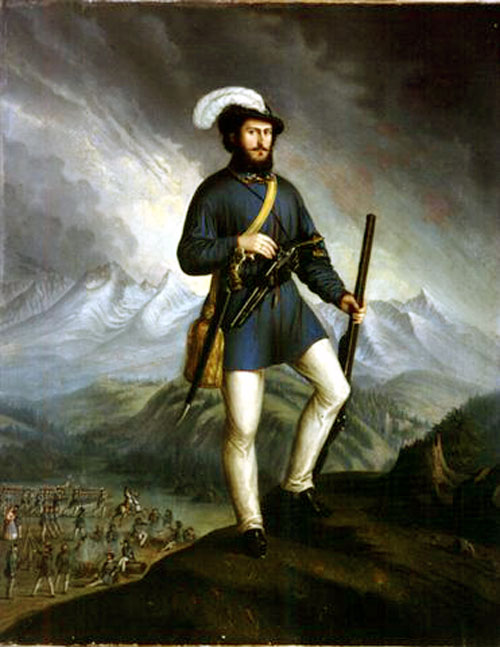
Captain Ján Francisci with the Slovak Volunteers (1850)

In 1843, he decided that he wanted to be an artist and entered the Academy of Fine Arts, Prague. His teacher there was the German history painter, Christian Ruben who, at that time, was also the Academy's Director. His father died in 1844, cutting off his financial support, so he sought and obtained the patronage of a nobleman from Orava named Michał Kubín. In addition to painting, he studied lithography and made some illustrations for the botanical dictionary of Jan Svatopluk Presl.

=== Slovak nationalism ===
Shortly after, he joined the Slovak nationalist movement led by Ľudovít Štúr, organizing rallies and patriotic meetings during the Slovak Uprising. During that time, through their mutual interest in painting, he met and married the daughter of a local landowner.

In 1854, he and his family moved to Liptovský Mikuláš, where he spent eleven years as a drawing teacher at the Lutheran girls' school, dabbled in photography and decorated curtains for amateur theater groups. In 1860, he resumed his patriotic activities and, the following year, participated in the constitutional convention at Martin. In 1863, he was one of the founding members of the Matica slovenská.

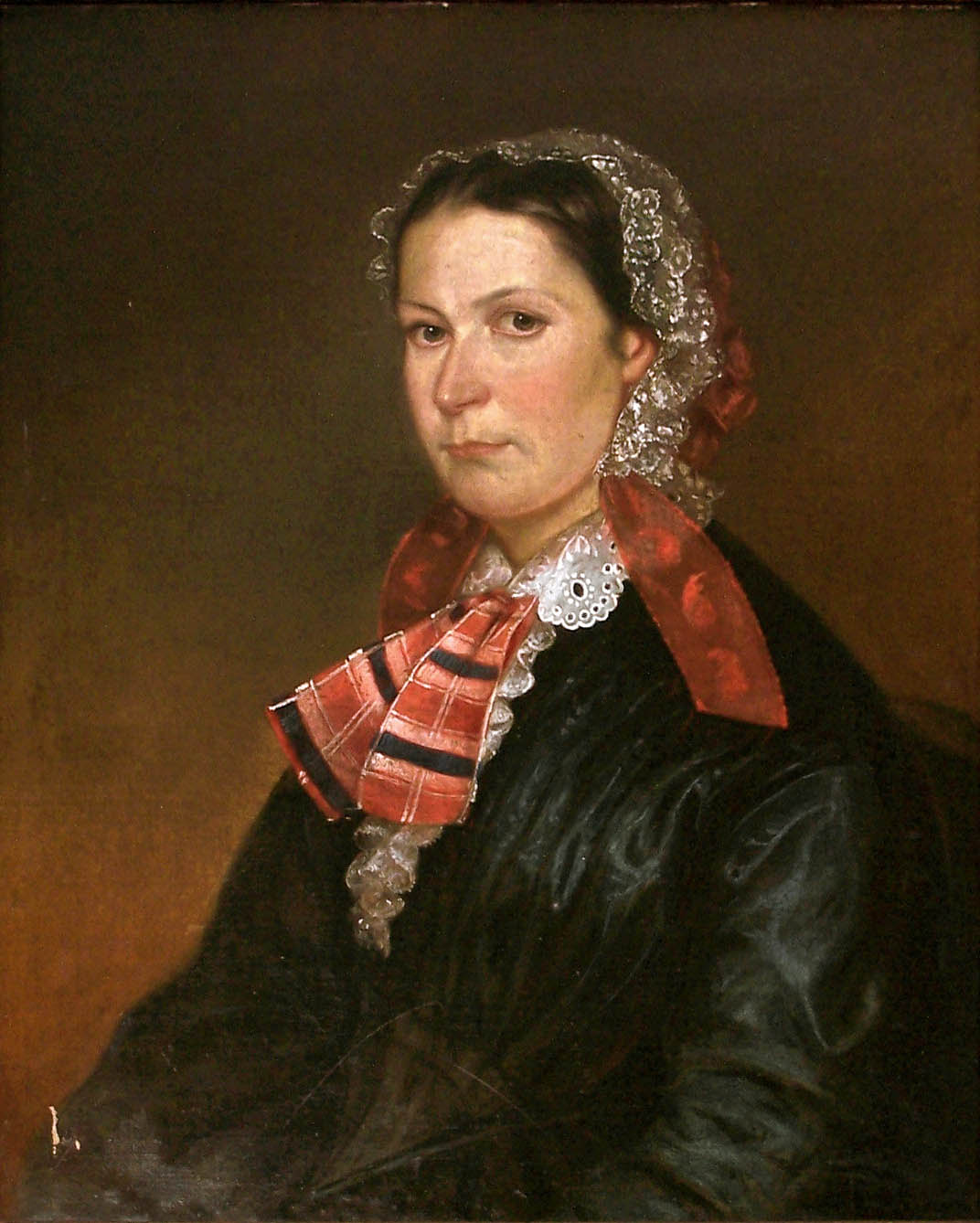
Woman with Bonnet

Deeply in debt, he left Slovakia in 1865 and took his family to Bielsko-Biała in Galicia. In 1876, he travelled to Italy, in search of his son Ľubor, who had deserted from the Austro-Hungarian Army.

He died in Bielsko-Biała. His cause of death was given as pneumonia. In 1955, an art gallery bearing his name was opened in Liptovský Mikuláš and, three years later, a statue of him was dedicated in Bratislava. It was sculpted by Fraňo Štefunko, who specialized in figures from the Slovak Uprising.
