= Ján Francisci-Rimavský =

Slovak writer and politician (1822–1905)

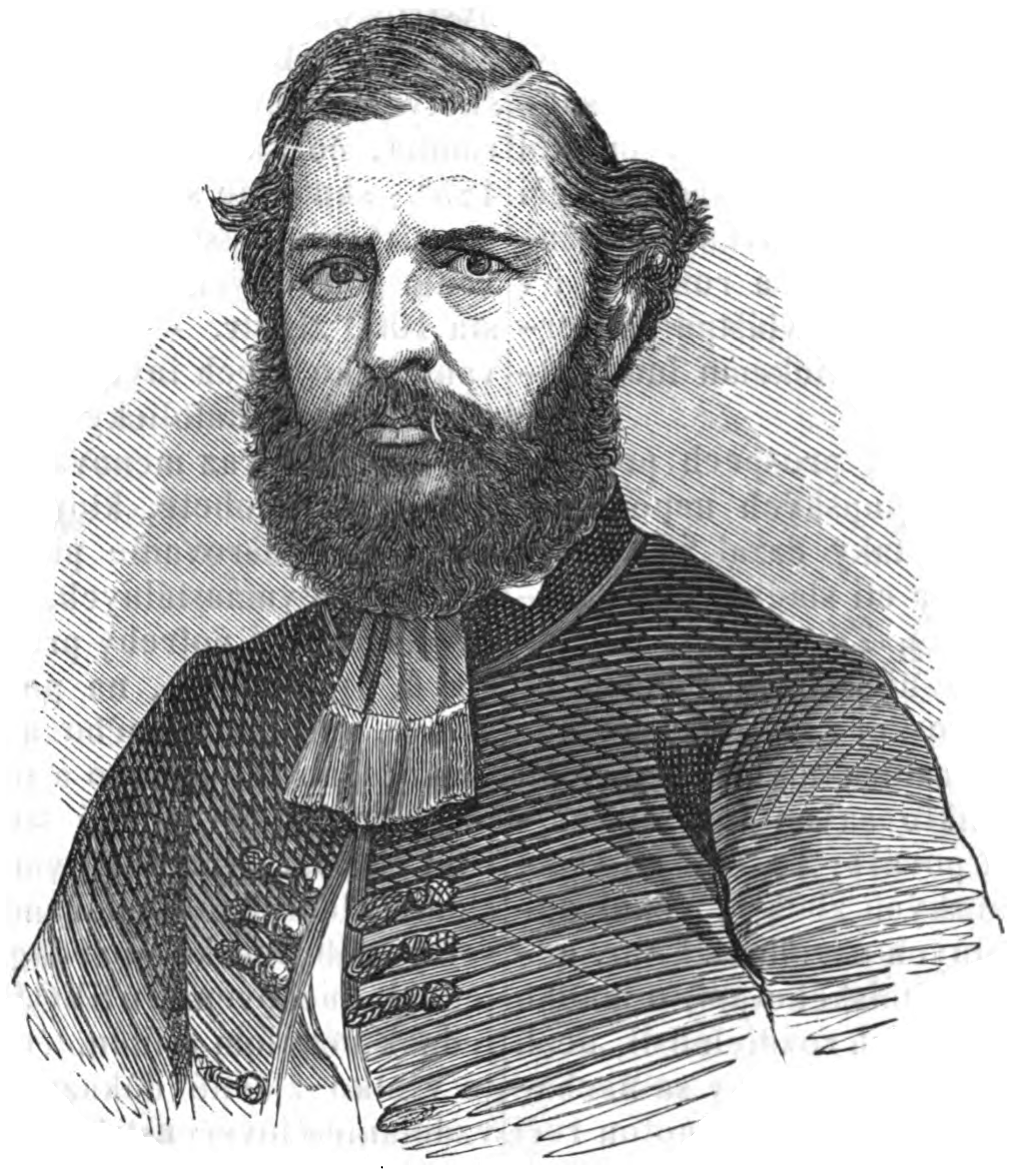
Ján Francisci-Rimavský, from Sokol (1862)

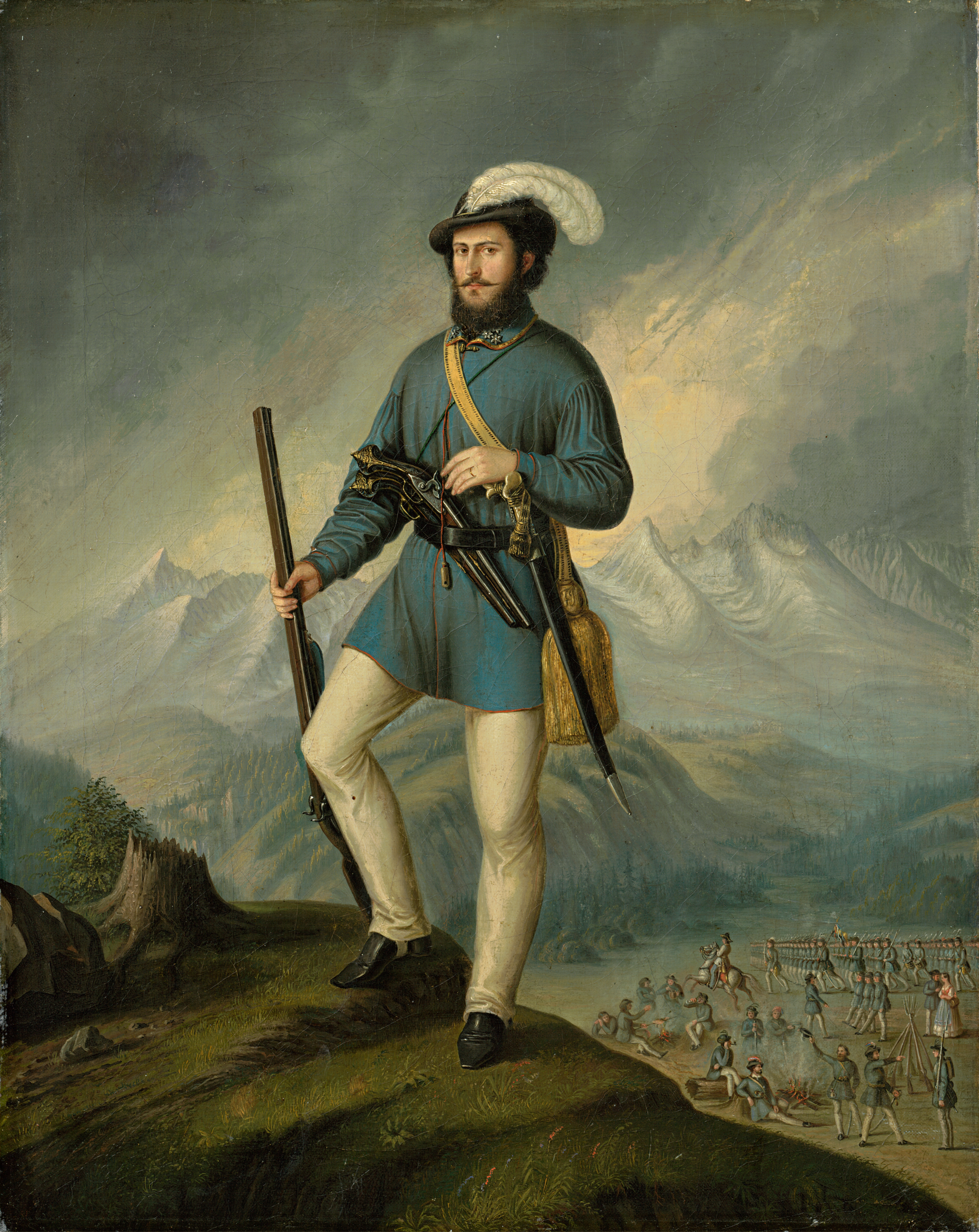
Francisci as a captain during the Slovak Uprising. Portrait by Peter Michal Bohúň.

Ján Samuel Francisci-Rimavský (born Ján Francisci, Hungarian: Francisci János; 1 June 1822 – 7 March 1905) was a Slovak poet, novelist, translator, journalist and politician, who collaborated with the national leader, Ľudovít Štúr and philosophical-legal theorist and ideologist of the Slovak national movement Štefan Marko Daxner. He used numerous pseudonyms, including Janko Francisci, Janko Rimavský, Slavoľub and Vratislav Rimavský.

Francisci established the tradition of fairy tale collections (in Slovakia) and also theoretically reflected the genre of folk fairy tales. His poetry and prose are first manifestations of the literary Slovak language. His poems are dominated by romantic pathos, folklore motifs, motifs of Slovak nature, patriotism, revolutionary-utopian idealism, but critical-social themes. Francisci, together with Daxner, initiated one of the most important state documents of Demands of the Slovak Nation and Memorandum of the Slovak Nation. He was also at the founding of Slovak Matica (Matica slovenská). Together with the Janko Kráľ, Ján Rotarides, Štefan Marko Daxner and Samuel Štefanovič (before them, for example, Ján Kollár), he belongs to the category of national awakeners (under the influence of Štúr, Hegel and Herder) who thought not only nationally but partly also internationally and in the spirit of humanism.

== Biography ==
He was born to a family of tailors in Hnúšťa, Kingdom of Hungary (present day Slovakia). From 1834 to 1839, he studied at the "Evangelical Lyceum" in Levoča, then went to Pressburg (present day Bratislava), where he first met Štúr. In 1843, he passed the candidate's exam in theology and continued his studies at the law college in Prešov. He worked briefly as a deputy professor at the Lyceum, then became an aide to a member of the Gömör és Kis-Hont County Council.

In 1848, during the Slovak Uprising, he worked with Štefan Marko Daxner to organize the National Guard and was briefly sentenced to prison. After his release, he became a captain with the Slovak volunteers. After the revolution, he worked in Banská Bystrica, where he got married; then became a county commissioner in Debrecen from 1853 to 1859. While serving in several other official positions, he was the editor of Pešťbudínske vedomosti (a twice-weekly political journal based in Pest) from 1861 to 1863.

That same year, he became an honorary life vice-chairman of the Matica Slovenská. From 1864 to 1867 he was the county administrator of Liptó County, but resigned after the Austro-Hungarian Compromise. He then became chief superintendent and inspector of the gymnasium in Revúca. In 1872, he retired to Martin to become a full-time writer, where he died in 1905.

He also collected Slovak folk and fairy tales, translated Shakespeare, and helped edit collections of other writers' works, including those by Pavol Dobšinský and Jozef Škultéty. His son Miloslav Francisci became a composer who wrote the first opera in Slovak (Bohatieri veselej družiny, 1917).

The Levoča Gymnasium was renamed in his honor in 1988.

== Selected writings ==
In the collection of the Library of Congress:

- Listy Jána Francisciho (Letters, edited by Michal Eliáš), V Martine : Matica slovenská, 1990 ISBN 80-7090-067-9
- Iskry zo zaviatej pahreby (Sparks from Embers, poetry) Tatran, 1977
- Slovenskje povesti (Slovak legends) Matica slovenská, 1975
