= Ľudovít Štúr Institute of Linguistics =

Research institute in the Slovak Academy of Sciences

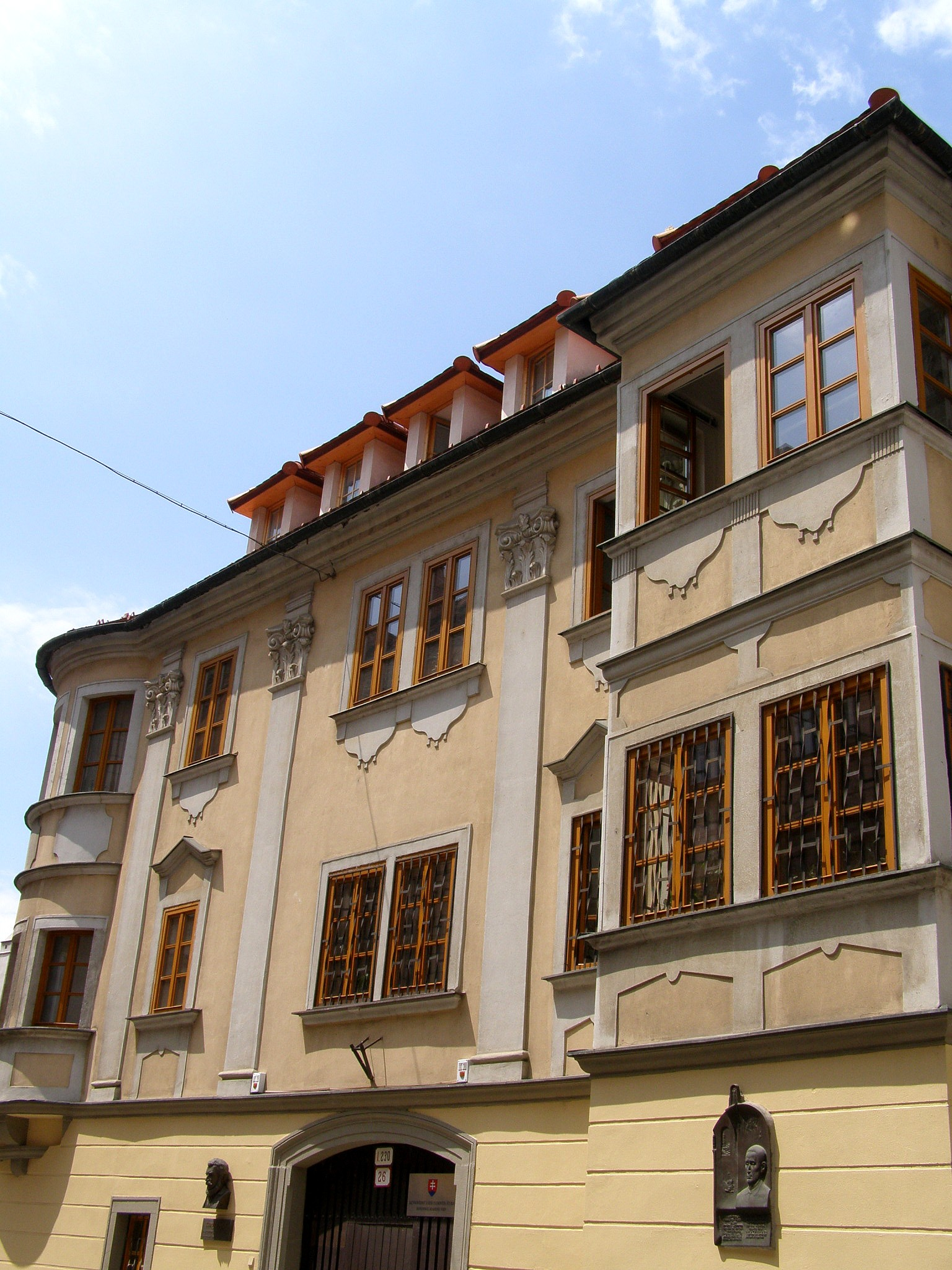
- Ľ. Štúr Institute of Linguistics
- Other name: Slovak: Jazykovedný ústav Ľudovíta Štúra Slovenskej akadémie vied
- Established: 1943
- Chair: Ľubor Králik
- Formerly called: Institute of Linguistics
- Address: Panská 26, 811 01 Bratislava 1
- Location: Bratislava, Slovakia
- Coordinates: 48.1417°N 17.1058°E
- Interactive map of Ľudovít Štúr Institute of Linguistics
- Website: https://www.juls.savba.sk

Ľ. Štúr Institute of Linguistics of the Slovak Academy of Sciences is a primary research institution in the Slovak Republic. It is named after Ľudovít Štúr, the most important leader of the Slovak national revival.

== Departments ==
As of 2025, the Institute consists of 6 research departments:

- Department of Dialectology
- Department of the Slovak Language History, Onomastics and Etymology
- Department of Language Cultivation and Terminology
- Department of Social Linguistics
- Department of Contemporary Lexicology and Lexicography
- Slovak National Corpus

== Significant publications ==
The most important publications are as follow:

- Morphology of the Slovak Language, 1966,
- Vocabulary Dynamics of Contemporary Slovak, 1989
- Slovak Language Dictionary, 6 vol., 1959 – 1968
- Short Dictionary of Slovak, 4th ed. 2003
- Slovak Synonym Dictionary, 2nd ed. 2000
- Dictionary of Historical Slovak, 7 vol., 1991 – 2008
- Slovak Dialect Dictionary, up to now 2 vol., 1994, 2006; *Dictionary of Contemporary Slovak, up to now 2 vol., 2006, 2011)
- The Rules of Slovak Orthography, 3rd ed. 2000

Several works have been issued treating the territorial differentiation of Slovak dialects within the Slovak territory as well as Slavic countries and the Carpathian area:

- Atlas of the Slovak Language, 4 vol., 1968 – 1984
- Slavic Linguistic Atlas, up to now
- Carpathian Dialectological Atlas, 8 vol., introductory (unnumbered) vol. in 1987, vol. 1 – 7 were issued in 1989

The Institue has also produced works on confrontational research of Slavic vocabulary:

- Czech-Slovak Dictionary, 2nd ed. 1981
- Great Russian-Slovak Dictionary, 5 vol., 1960 – 1970
- Great Slovak-Russian Dictionary, 6 vol., 1979 – 1995

== Journals ==
Another core activity is the publication of science and popular science periodicals:

- Journal of Linguistics (Slovak: Jazykovedný časopis), a journal focusing on general and theoretical questions of linguistics and its methodology including contemporary general, structural, functional, pragmalinguistic and cognitive linguistics, comparative works and also studies from other disciplines of the humanities dealing with philosophical or cultural aspects of language.
- Culture of the Word (Slovak: Kultúra slova), a peer-reviewed scientific popularization journal for language culture and terminology.
- Slovak Language (Slovak: Slovenská reč), a scientific journal devoted to the research of the Slovak language.
