= Anti-Hungarian Slovak Armed Actions in 1848–1849 =

19th-century uprising of Slovaks against Hungarian rule

- Part of the Hungarian War of Independence of 1848–1849
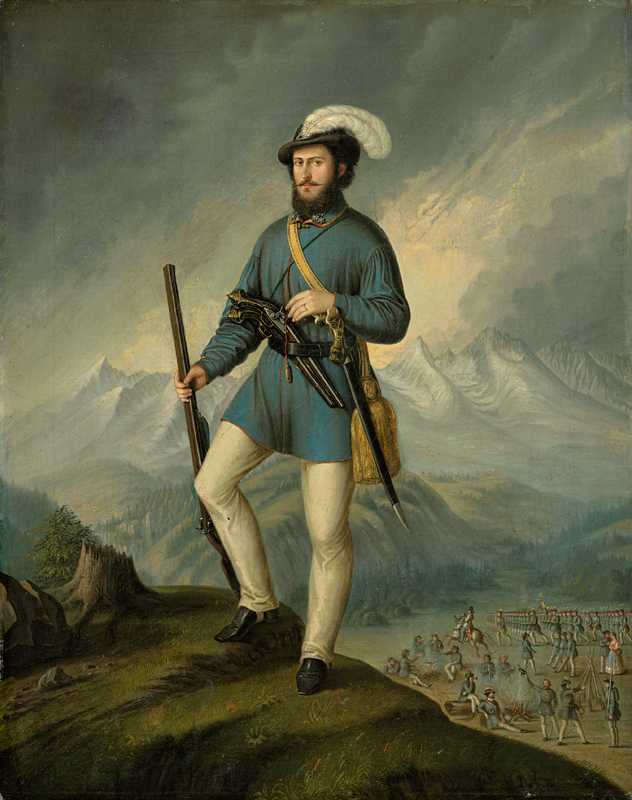
- Painting of Capt. Ján Francisci with Slovak volunteers in Myjava (Miava) by Peter Michal Bohúň
Date	19 September 1848 – 4 October 1849
Location	Western parts of Upper Hungary (today Western Slovakia)
Result	Hungarian victory: Slovak uprising suppressed in September 1848. Slovak irregular volunteer forces subsequently attached to the Austrian Imperial Army as auxiliary units during the winter and summer campaigns. Austro-Russian victory: Hungarian War of Independence suppressed in August 1849.

Belligerents
Slovak National Council: Slovak militia and peasant guerrillas; Volunteers from Bohemia and Moravia; Supported by: Austrian Empire	Kingdom of Hungary: Hungarian Armies and Militias; Pro-loyalist Slovak volunteers

Commanders and leaders
Ľudovít Štúr; Jozef Miloslav Hurban; Michal Miloslav Hodža; Janko Kráľ; Ján Francisci-Rimavský; Bedrich Bloudek; František Zach	Lajos Kossuth; Lajos Batthyány; Józef Bem; Henryk Dembiński; Artúr Görgey; Sándor Petőfi; Sándor Rózsa; István Széchenyi; Józef Wysocki

Strength
6,000–10,000	Unknown

Casualties and losses
Unknown	Unknown

The Slovak Volunteer Campaigns, Slovak uprising of 1848–1849, Slovak Revolt or the Slovak Revolution occurred in Western parts of Upper Hungary (today mostly Western Slovakia) with the aim of equalizing Slovaks, democratizing political life and achieving social justice within the 1848–49 revolutions in the Habsburg Monarchy. It lasted from September 1848 to November 1849. In October 1848, Slovak leaders replaced their original Hungaro-federal program by Austro-federal, called for the separation of a Slovak district (Slovak: Slovenské Okolie) from the Kingdom of Hungary and for the formation of a new autonomous district within the framework of the Habsburg Monarchy.

The Slovak Legion did not exceed 1,000 men in strength, while according to some estimates, at least 20,000 Slovak soldiers fought in the Hungarian Honvéd Army against the Austrians in the Hungarian War of Independence of 1848–1849.

== Background ==
The year 1848 is well-noted in history as a peaking moment in nationalist sentiment among European nationalities. The Slovaks were an important part of the general revolts occurring in the Austrian Empire. Inspired by the French Revolution of 1848, a popular uprising in Vienna ousted the reactionary government of Prince Klemens von Metternich on 13 March 1848. This revolutionary fervor soon spread to the Hungarian lands of the Empire (also known as Transleithania). On 15 March, mass protests in Buda and Pest along with a proclamation of the Hungarian Diet under direction of Lajos Kossuth saw the Hungarian Kingdom declare itself independent of Habsburg domination.

=== Slovaks before 1848 ===
Slovaks were not prominently placed in this first wave of revolution in Transleithania. On 26–28 August 1844, a meeting of both Catholic and Protestant Slovaks met along with other factions in Liptószentmiklós (today: Liptovský Mikuláš). This town in the Žilina Region was the base of Slovak nationalist Michal Miloslav Hodža, uncle of future Czechoslovak politician Milan Hodža. The meeting, though with less Catholic participation than desired, formed a non-sectarian association called the Tatrín in order to unite all Slovak groups in one national bloc. Catholics became more involved in 1847 with their acceptance of Ľudovít Štúr's standardization of the Slovak language.

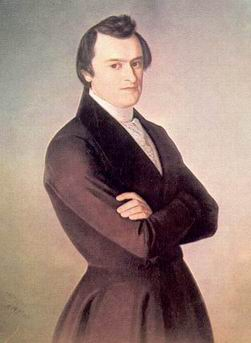
Michal Miloslav Hodža

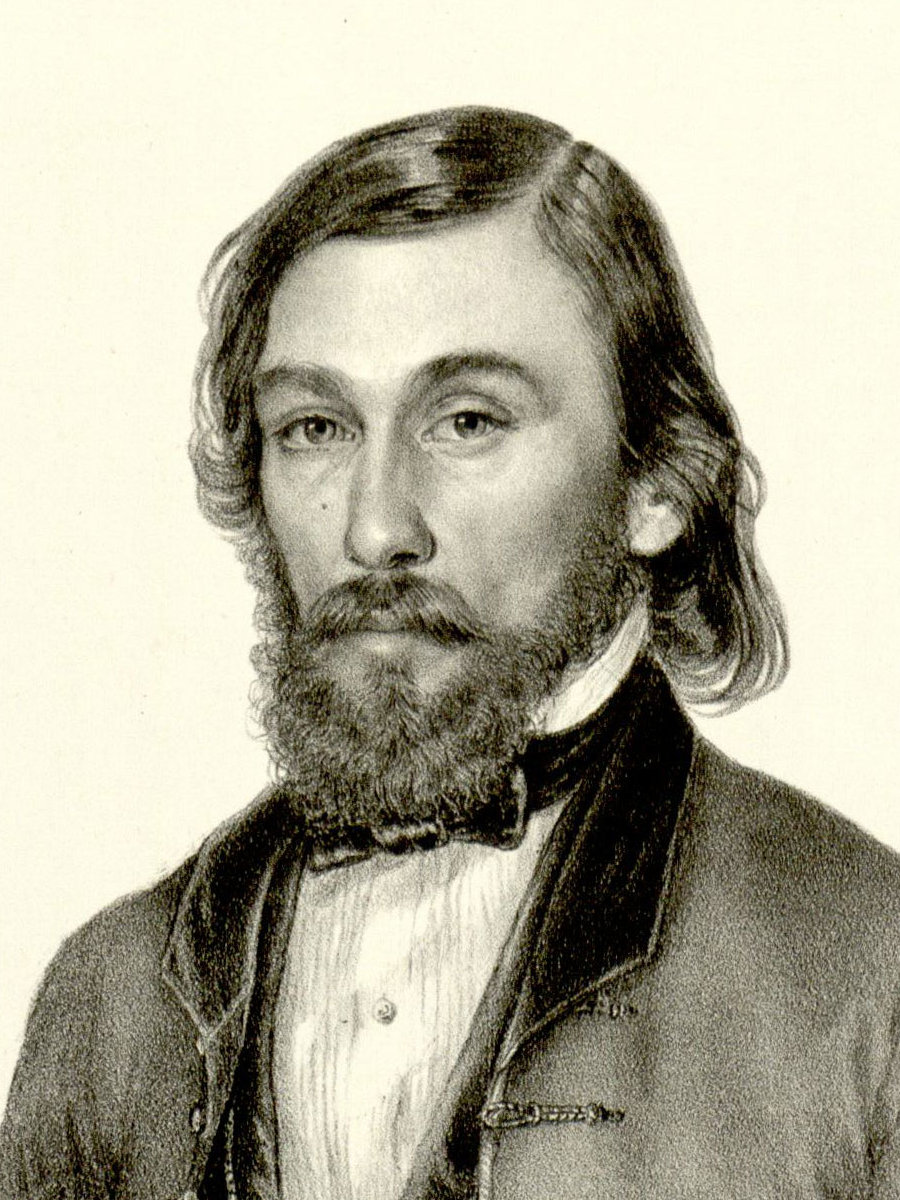
Jozef Miloslav Hurban

In addition to the uniting of Slovaks in one national bloc, there were other factors leading to the rise in Slovak consciousness before 1848. In 1845, governmental authorities permitted the printing of Slovak language newspapers for the first time. The first one was Ľudovít Štúr's The Slovak National News which printed its first issue on 1 August 1845. This was quickly followed by Jozef Miloslav Hurban's Slovak Views on the Sciences, Arts and Literature which did not have as much success as Štúr's paper. Beyond the printed word, representatives of the Slovak National Movement worked among the broader population, promoting education, Sunday schools, libraries, amateur theatre, temperance societies, and other social functions. In agriculture, Samuel Jurkovič founded a credit cooperative in the village of Sobotište, called the Farmer's Association, which was the first of its kind in Europe.

In November 1847 Ľudovít Štúr, the member of the Hungarian Diet for Zólyom (now Zvolen), spoke before his colleagues in Pressburg (Pozsony, today's Bratislava). In his speech to the Diet, Štúr summed up his six-point platform involving problematic political and economic issues. His points were:

- To proclaim through the Diet the legal, universal and permanent abolishment of serfdom, achieved through a buy-out of feudal contracts with state funds at minimum expense to commoners.
- To abolish the patrimonial court and free commoners from noble control.
- To allow commoners to represent their own interests via membership in County government and the Diet.
- To free privileged towns from county jurisdiction and reorganize the administration of royally chartered towns on the principal of representation by strengthening their voting rights in the Diet.
- To abolish the privilege of nobility and make all persons equal before the courts, abolish tax exemption for nobility and inheritance, ensure commoners the right to serve in public office and ensure freedom of the press.
- To reorganize the education system in a way to best serve the needs of the people and to ensure a better livelihood for teachers.

Along with these points, several of which were praised by Lajos Kossuth, Štúr raised the issues about the use of the Slovak language in government and the enforcement of Magyar interference in many parts of Slovak life, including religion.

== Events of 1848–1849 ==
=== Build up to the revolt ===
After the revolution in Pest-Buda on March the 15th and the formation of a new government on March the 17th, 1848, the threat of a forcible Magyarization of the Slovak lands grew ever more present. In Hont County, this tension came to a boiling point as two Slovaks, Janko Kráľ and Ján Rotarides, made demands for the abolition of serfdom and official recognition of the Slovak language in schools and administration. Their demands soon landed the two Slovak poets in jail. On March the 28th, 1848, a vast assembly of former serfs convened by Liptó County and held in Hodža's base of Liptovský Mikuláš was used as a proving ground for systematic recognition of new rights and extended rights to national minorities. This was met well, and soon the word was spreading about possible new freedoms that would reach Slovaks, prompting some miners from today's Central-Slovakia to demonstrate rowdily before being quieted by a special commissioner from Pest-Buda.

In April 1848, Štúr and Hurban attended a preliminary Slavic meeting in Vienna, which would later provide the basis for the first Pan-Slavic Congress to be held in Prague. In the meantime, back in Liptovský Mikuláš, Hodža along with twenty delegates created a document entitled Demands of the Slovak Nation which listed 14 points setting national and social goals for the Slovak nation. Naturally this document was received coldly by Pest-Buda, which subsequently imposed martial law on Upper Hungary and issued warrants for Štúr, Hurban and Hodža on May the 12th, 1848. At the same time, uprisings among Serbs, Croats and Slovenes in the southern part of Hungary diverted Magyar attention to the south, as these conflicts were more armed uprisings than the Slovak one. Hurban attended a session of the Croatian Diet on 5 July, speaking to the Croats on the plight of the Slovaks. Hurban spoke so well a joint Croat-Slovak declaration was issued shortly thereafter which only inflamed Magyar opinion. When the full Pan-Slavic Congress met on June the 2nd, 1848, Štúr, Hurban, Hodža and many other prominent Slovaks attended, along with hundreds of other Slavic delegates. This congress was held with the aim of developing a cohesive strategy for all Slavic peoples living in Austro-Hungarian territories. The congress was cut short when an armed uprising in Prague on June the 12th prompted a hurried end to the affair. However, one critical item came out of the short congress for the Slovak cause. In the congress, the Slovaks secured the help of two Czech military officers, Bedřich Bloudek and František Zach, in case the Slovaks came to armed blows with the Hungarians.

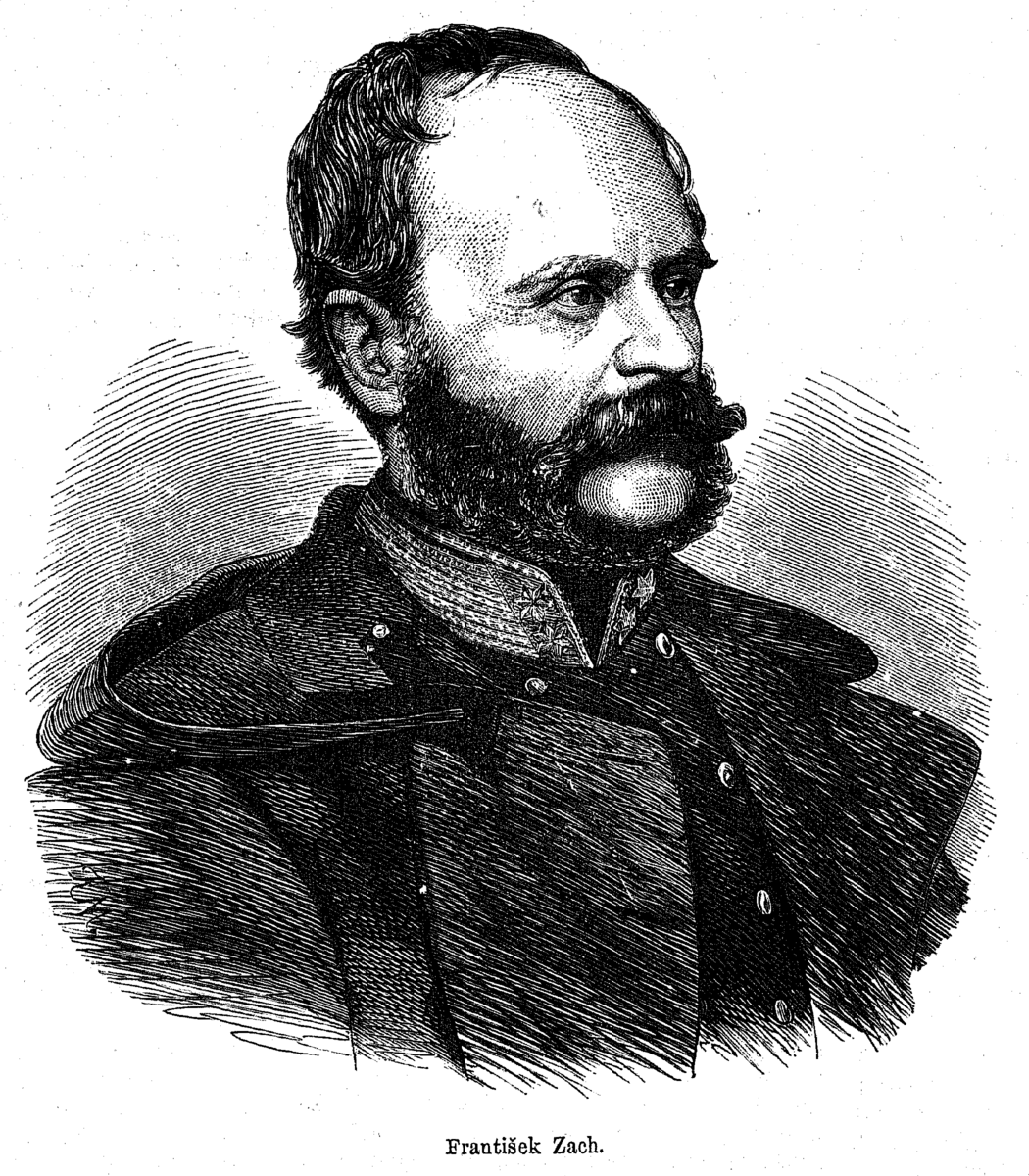
František Zach in 1867

Though many calls for autonomy came from nearly every corner of the Empire, Vienna noted that neither at the Pan-Slavic conference, nor at other Slavic uprisings was the thought of the splitting or dissolving the Empire considered, which was only called for in Hungary. Seeing the situation as malleable, the Emperor along with his closest advisors authorized armed action against the Hungarian uprising. This first manifested itself in the form of the leader of the Croatians, Ban (governor) Josip Jelačić, a friend of the Slovaks, who was authorized to march against the Hungarians in August 1848 after the Hungarians had defied a direct imperial order. Despite this, Vienna's response to the Hungarian uprising had stayed largely quiet and mixed. While allowing Jelacic to march against the Magyars, they had also given the Hungarian Army several units in order to help preserve internal order. At the same time, Slovaks started working with Jelacic's Croatians by creating a Slovak volunteer corps. This corps was put together and gathered in Vienna from August to September 1848. In order to lead this burgeoning revolt, a Slovak National Council was organized in Vienna, where a marker stands today commemorating the spot. The council was made up of Štúr, Hurban and Hodža— the "big three" of the Slovak nationalist groups— with the Czech František Zach as commander-in-chief.

=== Revolt ===
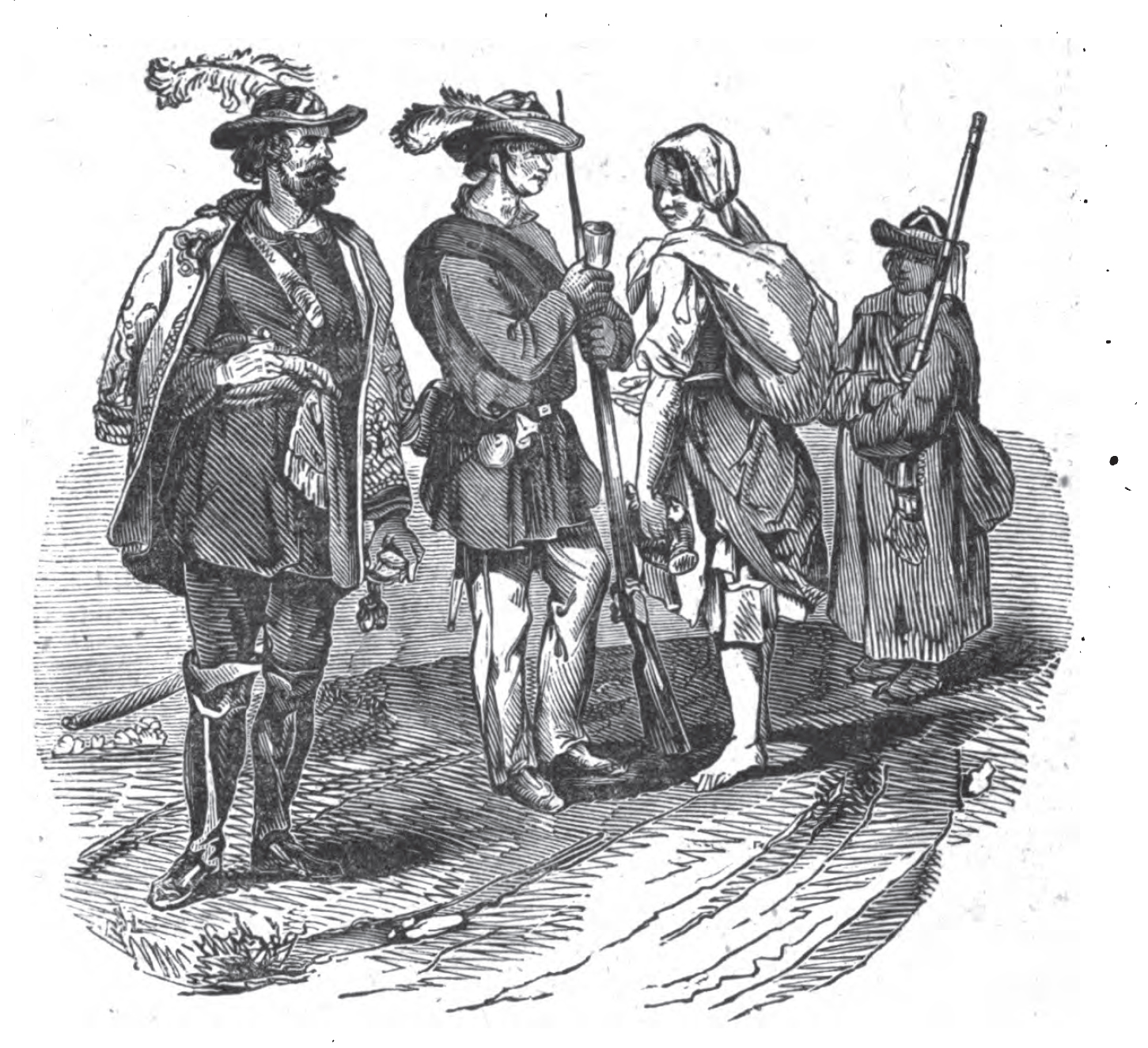
Slovak volunteers, 1848/49

Initially, the strategy for the volunteer corps was not clear. However, on 16 September a decision was made that the 600 men of the corps would march from Vienna, up the Vág River valley and into Turóc County and Liptó County Counties via the southern Moravian town of Břeclav. When the corps arrived at the Hungarian border on the 18th, they were met with 500 more volunteers from Brno and Prague. Once convened, the volunteers received arms and swore an oath on the Slovak flag. Despite nudging Viennese cooperation, when the volunteers encountered Imperial troops on the road to Miava they were regarded coolly by the troops.

Once the volunteers arrived in Miava, an assembly of Slovaks with Hurban presiding took the step of seceding from Hungary on 19 September 1848. Imperial troops soon ordered the Slovaks volunteers to leave Myjava, though this order was rejected and instead the corps attacked an Imperial detachment and confiscated its supplies. Despite this inauspicious act, Imperial troops ordered both sides to halt the fighting. After several more days of indecisive armed action, the volunteers retreated back into Moravia. Not long after, the new commander of Imperial forces sent to restore order in the Kingdom of Hungary, Count von Lamberg, was hacked and mangled by an irate mob in central Budapest only three days after arrival. This halted attempts at negotiations between Kossuth and the Imperial party. The Viennese response was to formally order the disbandment the Hungarian Diet and the appointment of Ban Josip Jelačić as newest commander over Hungary. However, effective response to this latest development was also halted by another popular, pan-Germanic uprising in Vienna at the time which resulted in the death of war minister Count Latour on 6 October 1848.

In this midst of the turmoil in Vienna, which saw the Emperor and the Imperial Diet flee to Olomouc in Moravia, Magyars stepped up measures against Slovaks, stripping the leaders of the Slovak National Council of their Hungarian citizenship and executing a handful of prisoners. This move caused the Slovak faction to appeal more to the Imperial court and despite initial concerns of the commander-in-chief Prince Windisch-Grätz, another Slovak volunteer unit was allowed to be created. Initial recruitment problems delayed this second campaign of the volunteer units until 4 December 1848. Throughout December and January, the Slovak volunteers under Bloudek worked with Imperial troops to reoccupy Túrócszentmárton. On 13 January 1849 a mass rally in Túrócszentmárton was followed by the signing up of new volunteers. Acting with Imperial support, Bloudek moved east and, picking up another few thousand volunteers, occupied Eperjes (Prešov) on 26 February and Kassa (Košice) on 2 March. Meanwhile, another detachment of Slovaks was defeated after running into Magyar forces near Murányalja (Muráň) in Besztercebánya (Banská Bystrica). To make matters worse, dissension between Czech and Slovak officers in the volunteer corps began to erupt.

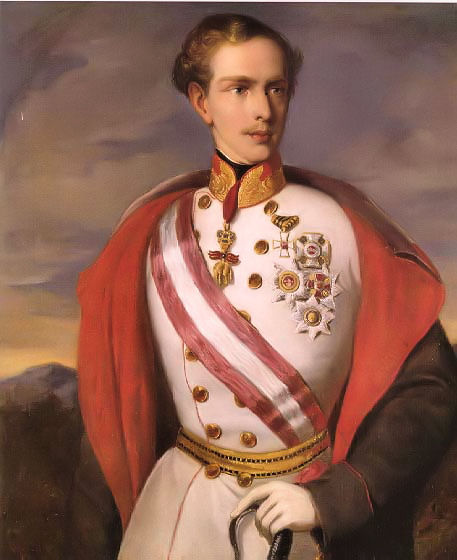
A young Emperor Franz Joseph I

After leading activist rallies in Eperjes and Túrócszentmárton, Štúr and Hurban led a delegation of twenty-four men to meet the new Emperor Franz Jozef with a proposal to make Slovakia an autonomous grand duchy directly under Viennese oversight with representation in the Imperial Diet. The delegates also requested a Slovak provincial diet, with further demands for Slovak schools and institutions. Despite a formal audience with the Emperor, little real progress resulted and the Slovaks were sent packing hoping for more productive results in the future.

After several victorious battles in Spring of 1849, Kossuth and the Hungarian Diet declared the Habsburgs deposed on 14 April 1849. Around the same time, the Slovak volunteer corps, largely stationed in Árva County, was dealing with internal struggles of its own. Conflicts between Czech and Slovak officers soon brought about the effectual dissolving of the corps. After Russian intervention by Tsar Nicholas I brought about the gradual fall of Kossuth and Hungarian independence. During this period, the corps was revived one final time to 'mop-up' isolated Magyar units until the eventual capitulation of Magyar forces at Világos (what is now Şiria in Romania) on 13 August 1849. On 9 October 1849, the Imperial army transferred the Slovak corps from the central territories of Upper Hungary to Pozsony, where it was formally disbanded on 21 November 1849. This marked the end of Slovak participation in the Revolutions of 1848–1849 that swept the continent of Europe

== Hungarian perspective ==
Ferdinand V endorsed the reformist demands of the Hungarian diet and appointed a constitutional government led by Lajos Batthyány. The conservative circles of the Vienna court feared the growing independence of the Hungarians, so they instructed the Ban of Croatia to attack Hungary. Legally this meant that a monarch attacks one of his country's lawful government with another of his country's army. Later the conservatives in Vienna forced Ferdinand to abdicate and replaced him with the young Franz Joseph. He was not crowned a king of Hungary therefore his rule lacked a legal basis in Hungary. In order to defeat the now open (but lawful) rebellion of Hungary, the Viennese court manipulated the ethnic minorities of Hungary into revolt against the Hungarian government (the very same government that achieved the abolition of serfdom in the Kingdom, regardless of ethnicity).

The claim that the Slovak nation sided with Vienna is erroneous - they could hardly recruit around 2000 people from Upper Hungary (however their highest number is estimated cca. 10,000) - in fact the number of Slovaks fighting on the Hungarian side was a magnitude greater (estimated around 40,000 by historians). However, there were cases of ethnic Slovaks resisting recruitment into the Hungarian Army, notably in the western part of the Nyitra County and in parts of the Gömör és Kishont County, especially in the town of Tiszolcz (Tisovec) where the locals protested against the unlawful Hungarian recruitment and were led by Štefan Marko Daxner. The Slovaks had a much higher percentage of their population serving in the Honvédség (Home Guard) than Hungarians. Notable troops with purely or almost purely Slovak soldiers were found in the 2., the 4., the 34., the 51., the 60. and the 124. infantry battalions, and a great many Slovaks served in the most famous red-hatted 9. battalion. Also, the 8. and 10. Hussar regiments had more companies composed of Slovak soldiers. There were also a lot of high-ranking officers in the Honvédség, who considered themselves Slovak patriots, most notably Ľudovít Benický (Lajos Beniczky), who was nicknamed the "Duke of Slovaks" by contemporaries, and he didn't learn Hungarian until after the end of the war.

== See also ==
- Hungarian Revolution of 1848, for further Magyar history surrounding the Revolutions of 1848.
- Revolutions of 1848 in the Habsburg areas, for a broader view of the Revolutions of 1848 in the Habsburg Empire.
- Revolutions of 1848, for the most broad view of the European conflicts of the era in general.
- Slovak National Uprising, second Slovak revolt from August to October 1944.
- Velvet Revolution, third and the most successful Slovak revolt in 1989.
- "Nad Tatrou sa blýska" ("Lightning over the Tatras"), the official national anthem of Slovakia. The song was popular among the 1848 Slovak volunteer soldiers.
