= Bedřich Bloudek =

Czech military leader (1815–1875)

Bedřich Bloudek (24 March 1815 – 11 August 1875) was a Czech military leader who participated in the Slovak Uprising in 1848.

== Life ==
Bedřich Bloudek was born on 24 March 1815 in Křižanov and started a career in the Austrian Army. He saw action during the Slovak Uprising in 1848, when František Zach and he led a force of 600 volunteers, most of them students, on 16 September from Moravia to Western Slovakia. They reached Myjava, where the political independence of Slovakia from Hungary was declared on 18 September. Then they came to Senica and Stará Turá. But finally they were forced to withdraw their troops after ten days of engagement only. Bloudek was also member of the Slovak National Council.

Bedřich Bloudek left the Austrian Army as lieutenant colonel and died on 11 August 1875 in the spa resort Toplice Topusko near Glina, Croatia.
