= Hnúšťa =

- Town
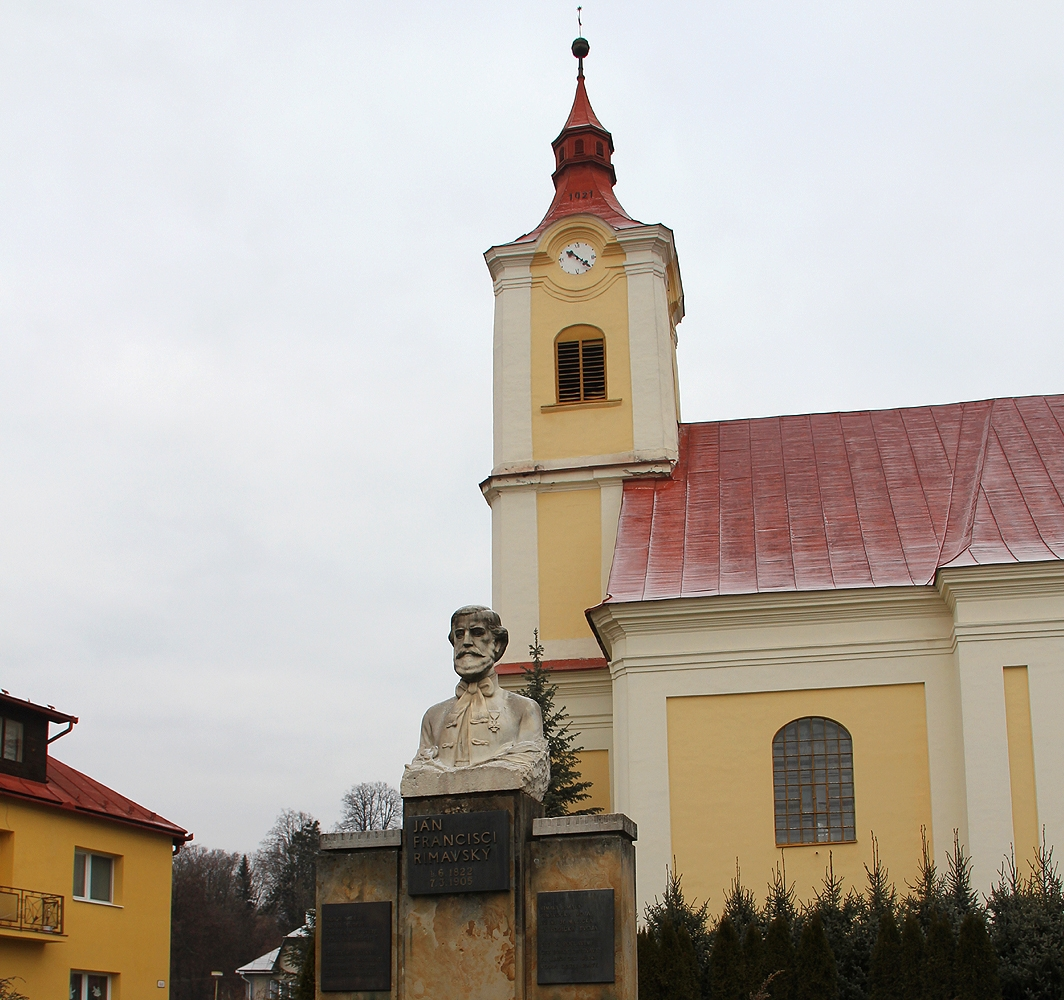
- Lutheran church

- Flag Coat of arms

- Location of Hnúšťa in the Banská Bystrica Region Location of Hnúšťa in Slovakia
- Coordinates: 48°34′24″N 19°57′14″E
- Country: Slovakia
- Region: Banská Bystrica Region
- District: Rimavská Sobota District
- First mentioned: 1334

Government
  - Mayor: Roman Lebeda

Area
  - Total: 68.04 km^{2} (26.27 sq mi)
- (2022)
- Elevation: 389 m (1,276 ft)

Population (2025)
  - Total: 6,386
- Time zone: UTC+1 (CET)
  - Summer (DST): UTC+2 (CEST)
- Postal code: 981 01
- Area code: +421 47
- Vehicle registration plate (until 2022): RS
- Website: mesto.hnusta.sk

Hnúšťa (Hungarian: Nyustya) is a town and municipality in the Rimavská Sobota District of the Banská Bystrica Region of southern Slovakia. It is the birthplace of the well-known 19th-century Slovak writer and member of the Štúr generation, Ján Francisci-Rimavský. He is commemorated by a statue and a plaque near the town's main square.

== History ==
The town was first mentioned in 1334.

== Geography ==
The municipality lies at an altitude of 389 metres (1,276 ft) and covers an area of 68.04 km^{2} (26.27 sq mi) (2025).

It is located in the Slovenské rudohorie mountains, in the Rimava river valley near Rimavská Sobota.

== Population ==
Historical population
Year	Pop.	±%
1970	5,329	—
1980	6,282	+17.9%
1991	7,146	+13.8%
2001	7,557	+5.8%
2011	7,781	+3.0%
2021	6,762	−13.1%
Source: Censuses

Population statistic (10 years)
Year	1995	2005	2015	2025
Count	7484	7513	7611	6386
Difference		+0.38%	+1.30%	−16.09%

Population statistic
Year	2024	2025
Count	6436	6386
Difference		−0.77%

It has a population of 6386 people (31 December 2025).

=== Ethnicity ===
Census 2021 (1+ %)
Ethnicity	Number	Fraction
Slovak	6106	90.29%
Not found out	584	8.63%
Romani	146	2.15%
Total	6762	

In year 2021 was 6762 people by ethnicity 6106 as Slovak, 584 as Not found out, 146 as Romani, 60 as Hungarian, 31 as Czech, 8 as Rusyn, 7 as Chinese, 6 as Russian, 5 as Vietnamese, 5 as Other, 4 as Turkish, 4 as German, 3 as Ukrainian, 3 as Romanian, 2 as Polish, 2 as English, 1 as Serbian, 1 as Austrian, 1 as Moravian and 1 as Albanian.

Note on population: The difference values of population numbers in the table "Population statistic" and in the sections "Ethnicity" & "Religion" is caused by the use of various statistical methods.

=== Religion ===
Census 2021 (1+ %)
Religion	Number	Fraction
None	2885	42.66%
Roman Catholic Church	1653	24.45%
Not found out	1140	16.86%
Evangelical Church	885	13.09%
Total	6762	

In year 2021 was 6762 people by religion 2885 from None, 1653 from Roman Catholic Church, 1140 from Not found out, 885 from Evangelical Church, 48 from Greek Catholic Church, 20 from Christian Congregations in Slovakia, 19 from Baptists Church, 16 from United Methodist Church, 15 from Calvinist Church, 13 from Ad hoc movements, 11 from Jehovah's Witnesses, 10 from Buddhism, 8 from Paganism and natural spirituality, 8 from Other and not ascertained christian church, 8 from Seventh-day Adventist Church, 6 from Eastern Orthodox Church, 5 from Islam, 5 from Other, 3 from Apostolic Church, 2 from Old Catholic Church, 1 from Jewish community and 1 from Church of Jesus Christ of Latter-day Saints.

== Economy ==
A factory for the production of chemicals was one of the main employers in Hnúšťa region. Now several middle sized companies are located in the town industrial park. The local shopping center attract visitors from neighbouring villages.

== Notable people ==
- Ján Francisci-Rimavský, Slovak poet, member of Štúr generation
- Ľudovít Kaník, politician

== Twin towns — sister cities ==
Hnúšťa is twinned with:

- Dobruška, Czech Republic
- Lwówek Śląski, Poland

== See also ==
- List of municipalities and towns in Slovakia
