= Ladislav Záborský =

Slovak painter (1921–2016)

- Born: 22 January 1921; Tisovec, Czechoslovakia
- Died: 31 December 2016 (aged 95); Martin, Slovakia
- Education: Slovak University of Technology in Bratislava
- Spouse: Gabriela Bartošová (m. 1945)

Ladislav Záborský (22 January 1921 – 31 December 2016) was a Slovak painter.

== Life ==
Záborský was born in Tisovec on 22 January 1921. He went to high school in Banská Bystrica and studied at the Drawing and Painting Department of the Slovak University of Technology in Bratislava, his main professors were Martin Benka, Gustáv Mallý and Ján Mudroch.

In 1945 he married Gabriela Bartošová. Together they had three children: Vladimír (born in 1946, living in Bojnice), Terézia (*1947, living in Croix, France), Mária (*1951, living in Martin).

After graduation he worked as high school teacher in Martin. Because of his religious activities he was condemned to seven year imprisonment and stayed from 1953 to 1957 in the prisons of Ružomberok, Prague and Valdice. He experienced interrogation, intimidation, demanding prison conditions and threatening, too. He spent five months in solitary confinement where he wrote thirty poems depicting his feelings and talks to God. It is a kind of his chronicle from prison.

As he was forbidden to continue to work as high school teacher, he started a career as book illustrator, painter and church artist (stained glass windows in 25 churches and 21 Stations of the Cross).

In 1968–69 he stayed for a study visit to Paris and Brittany. After his return he lived in Martin until his death on 31 December 2016, at the age of 95.

== Work ==
The essence of his work is linked to the experience of his inner life. Each painting is an attempt to discover God and a dialogue with eternity. He is more than a religious painter; he is a painter of spiritual light. He says about himself: "The substance of my work is the experience of God transferred into my heart (...) Art that seeks truth and beauty, is the anticipation of eternity." He sees the weakness of abstract art in the absence of truth in beauty.

His work was shown in exhibitions in the following cities: Venice, Italy (1943); Košice (1946, 1993); Ružomberok (1947); Poprad (1960, 1963); Starý Smokovec (1962); Paris, France (1969); Žilina (1972, 1983, 1999, 2006); Bratislava (1973); Trnava (1973); Martin, Turčianska galéria (1991, 1996, 2001, 2006); Tisovec (1974); Liptovský Mikuláš (1995); Piešťany (1997); Vrútky (1999); Nitra (2000); Vranov nad Topľou (2001); Topoľčany (2002); Kežmarok (2007).

== Paintings ==
Among his paintings are:

- Adoration (Adorácia)
- After the Miraculous Draught of Fishes (Po zázračnom rybolove)
- Christ alone in the desert (Kristus sám v púšti)
- Church of grace (Kostol milostí)
- Cyril and Methodius (Cyril a Metod)
- Even more than the Good Samaritan (Najväčší milosrdný Samaritán)
- Expected with love (Očakávaný s láskou)
- Eye of providence (Oko prozreteľnosti)
- Healing the blind (Uzdravenie slepého)
- Holy Spirit above the waters (Duch Boží nad vodami)
- Human being in front of God (Človek pred Bohom)
- In the storm of life (V búrke života)
- Light of the Cross (Svetlo z kríža)
- Meditation (Meditácie)
- Meeting with Christ (Stretnutie s Kristom)
- Peace (Pokoj)
- Prayer (Modlitba)
- Return of the Prodigal Son (Návrat márnotratného syna)
- The flight of the soul towards God (Vzlet duše k Bohu)
- The narrow way to light and the broad street to darkness (Úzka cesta k Svetlu a široká do temnôt)
- Towards light (K Svetlu)
- Transfiguration on Mount Tabor (Premenenie na hore Tábor)
- Victory of light (Víťazstvo Svetla)
