= Lutheran Gymnasium Tisovec =

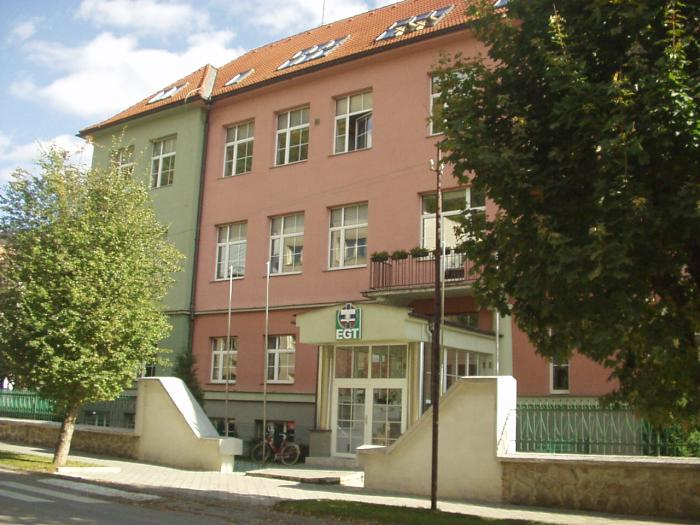
Facade of the building

Lutheran Gymnasium Tisovec (Slovak: Evanjelické Gymnázium Tisovec, EGT) is an elite boarding school in Slovakia founded in 1992. The school is partly bilingual (Slovak/English), which is made possible thanks to the number of American Lutheran missionaries who teach at the school.

== History ==
The school is based on a long tradition of Lutheran education in the town. Church affiliated education was impossible during the communist era of Czechoslovakia. After the Velvet Revolution in 1989, Slovak Evangelical Lutheran Church started to work on the restoration of the Lutheran high school which used to be in Tisovec before World War II.

Currently, more than 300 students attend the school. The entrance exams are held every year in the spring. The school offers general education, aiming to prepare students for the entrance to a university. Over 90% of EGT's graduates continue their studies on a university level. Extracurricular activities include school choir, musical ensemble, bible study, debate club, student-run mock company, and computer programming. A Model United Nations Security Council session is organized at the school every year in April.
