= Evolutionary governance theory =

Evolutionary Governance Theory (EGT) is theoretical framework for analysing and explaining governance and its evolution. It is an approach that addresses the complex and non-linear nature of governance. EGT is different from other theoretical approaches in the sense that it recognizes that governance and its elements are constantly changing in interplay with each other.

EGT builds on a broad range of theoretical sources that includes systems theory, post structuralism, institutional economics, actor–network theory and development studies. It places emphasis on the co-evolution between discourses, actors and institutions. Therewith it offers a perspective on the way institutions, markets and societies evolve. It also draws upon evolutionary theory from biology: "EGT is indebted at an elementary level to biological evolutionary theory, more specifically to the version developed by Francisco Varela and Humberto Maturana, two biologists. They conceived the idea of autopoiesis, wherein everything in a biological system is the product of the evolution of that system."

EGT offers a framework for understanding how actors, subjects, objects, formal and informal institutions, and knowledge are in a continuous process of co-evolution, how different dependencies influence the course of evolution, and how different evolutionary pathways are created and influencing each other's development. It links up with the literature on social-ecological and complex-adaptive systems, with an emphasis on the processes and mechanisms that drive social evolution.

Within EGT, social systems theory is compatible with a version of discourse theory, largely in line with the Michel Foucault tradition, while also offering a place for actors and their strategizing.
