= Štefan Marko Daxner =

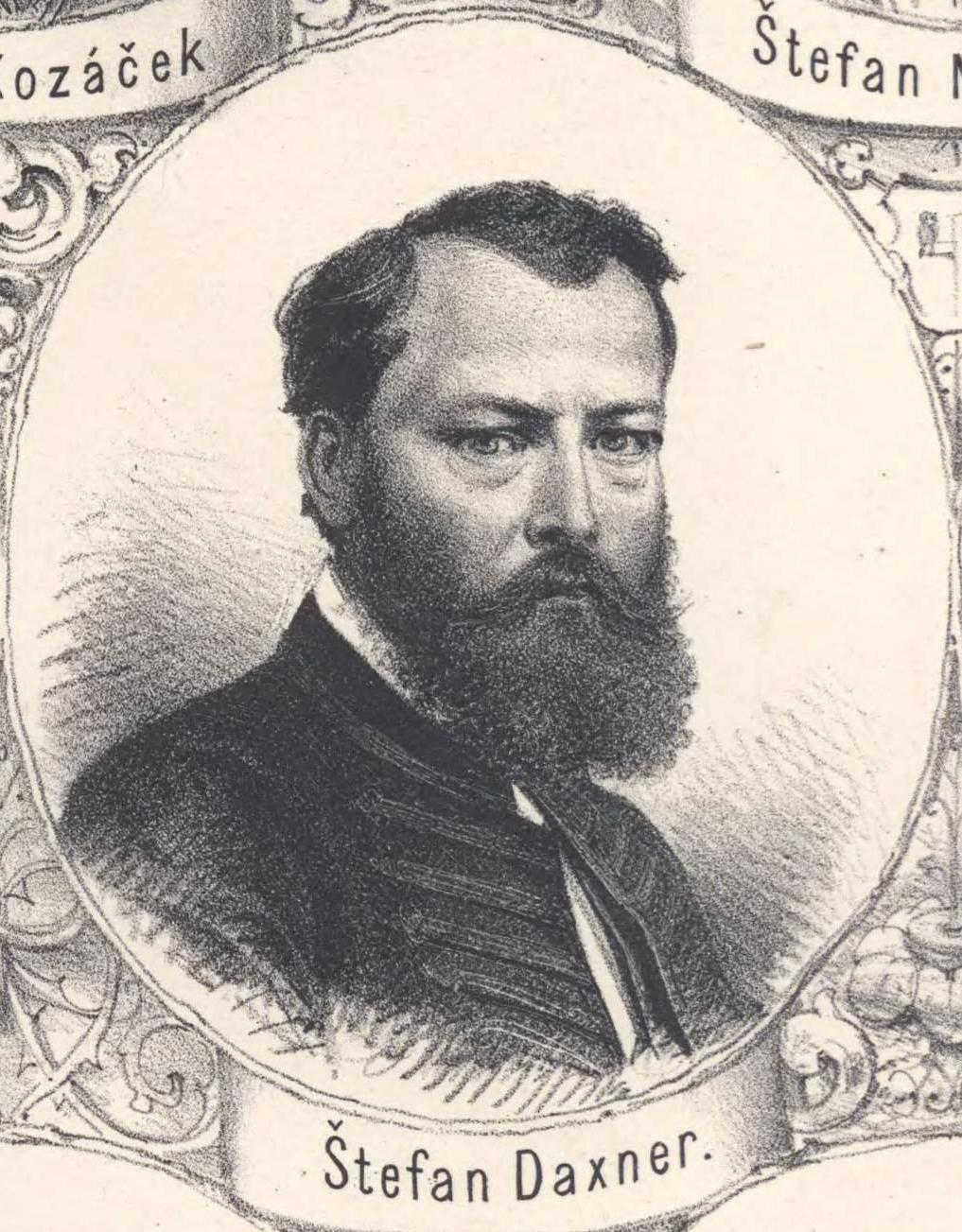
- Born: Tisovec, Austria-Hungary
- Died: April 11, 1892 (aged 69); Tisovec, Austria-Hungary
- Occupations: Politician, lawyer, publicist and national awakener

Štefan Marko Daxner, Hungarian: tóth-zabari Daxner István Márk (22 December 1822, Tiszolcz (German: Theißholz, Slovak: Tisovec), Gömör-Kis-Hont, Kingdom of Hungary, Austrian Empire – 11 April 1891, Tiszolc, Kingdom of Hungary) was an ethnic Slovak lower nobleman, politician, lawyer, and poet in the Kingdom of Hungary. He was a member of what became known as the Ľudovít Štúr generation.

Štefan Marko Daxner - "ideologist" of the national movement; movie document by Slovak Matica

His family (Hungarian: a Daxner család) is an old lower noble family, which emigrated from Switzerland to the Kingdom of Hungary in the 14th century.

== Biography ==
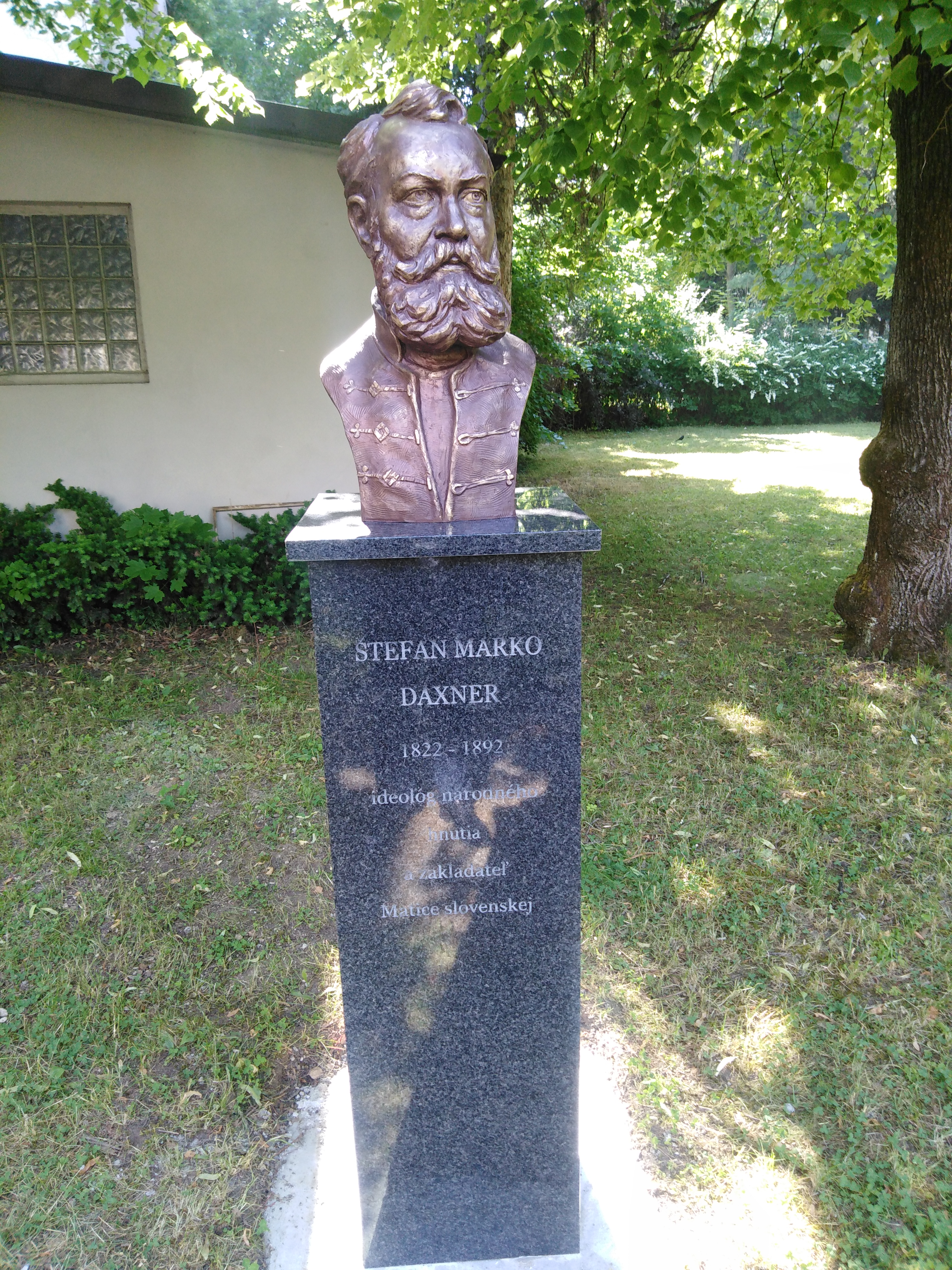
Bust of Štefan Marko Daxner in The Alley of National Awakeners, Martin, Slovakia

Daxner studied at the Lutheran Lyceum (preparatory high school plus freshmen college) of Pressburg (Pozsony, today's Bratislava) and at the College of Prešov (Eperjes). Between 1846 and 1872 he was a lawyer in Tisovec (Tiszolc), an official of several counties and an associate judge of the Commercial Court of Debrecen.

In 1847, just before the 1848-1849 Revolution, Daxner outlined a program unifying the requests for national (Slovak), cultural, political and social liberties. He was sentenced to death by Hungarian authorities in 1848, but was freed by the Austrian Imperial and Royal Army (which was fighting together with Slovaks against the Hungarians) and became a captain of a unit of Slovak volunteers during the 1848-1849 revolution.

He was a co-author of the Slovak Requests of Liptovský Mikuláš (Liptószentmiklós, 1848), Requests of the Slovak Nation (1848), Memorandum of the Slovak Nation in 1861, and was one of the founders of the Matica slovenská (Slovak Foundation) in 1863. He was also a founder of the first Slovak Gymnasium in Revúca (Nagyrőce) in 1862.

He is buried at the National Cemetery in Martin.

== Philosophical views ==
Lukáš Perný emphasizes that Daxner transformed Rousseau's idea of equality between people into the idea of equality between nations and also adds that Daxner was one of the most advanced social and philosophers of law in the Slovak 19th century. Dalimír Hajko states that "all of Daxner's political considerations published in the press were directly connected primarily with questions of practical ethics and philosophical questions of law, because it was these problem areas that most recently connected with the national emancipation process…" Rudolf Dupkala recalls that Daxner followed the Štúr´s understanding of the nation, the concept of the social contract according to J. J. Rousseau and the French Revolution.

== Sources ==
- Brief Biography @ Osobnosti.
- Biographical notes @ O Škole.
- Brief biography @ the Prešov website.
