= Ľudovít Štúr =

Slovak revolutionary, philosopher, politician and writer (1815–1856)

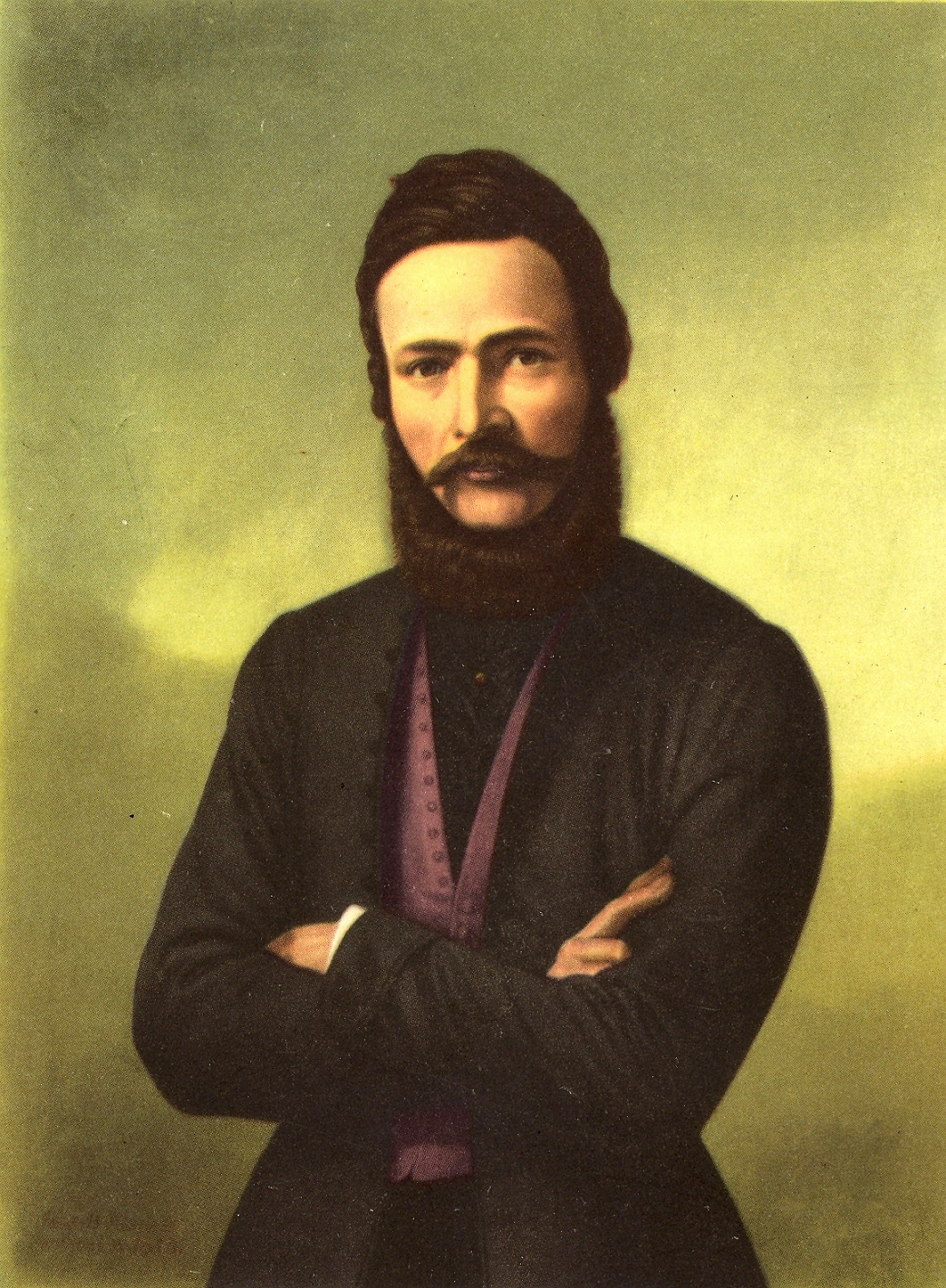
- Portrait by Jozef Božetech Klemens
- Born: 28 October 1815; Zayugróc, Kingdom of Hungary, Austrian Empire
- Died: 12 January 1856 (aged 40); Modra, Kingdom of Hungary, Austrian Empire
- Writing career
- Movement: Romanticism

Signature
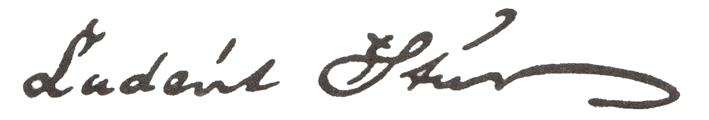

Ľudovít Štúr (Slovak pronunciation: [ˈʎudɔʋiːt ˈʃtuːr]; 28 October 1815 – 12 January 1856), also known as Ľudovít Velislav Štúr, (Note: Hungarian: Stúr Lajos; pen names: B. Dunajský, Bedlivý Ludorob, Boleslav Záhorský, Brat Slovenska, Ein Slave, Ein ungarischer Slave, Karl Wildburn, Pravolub Rokošan, Slovák, Starí, Velislav, and Zpěvomil) was a Slovak revolutionary, philosopher, politician and writer. He was a leader of the Slovak national revival in the 19th century and the codifier of standard Slovak. He is lauded as one of the most important figures in Slovak history.

Štúr was an organiser of the Slovak volunteer campaigns during the Hungarian Revolution of 1848. He was also a poet, journalist, publisher, teacher, linguist, and member of the Hungarian Parliament.

== Biography ==
=== Early life ===
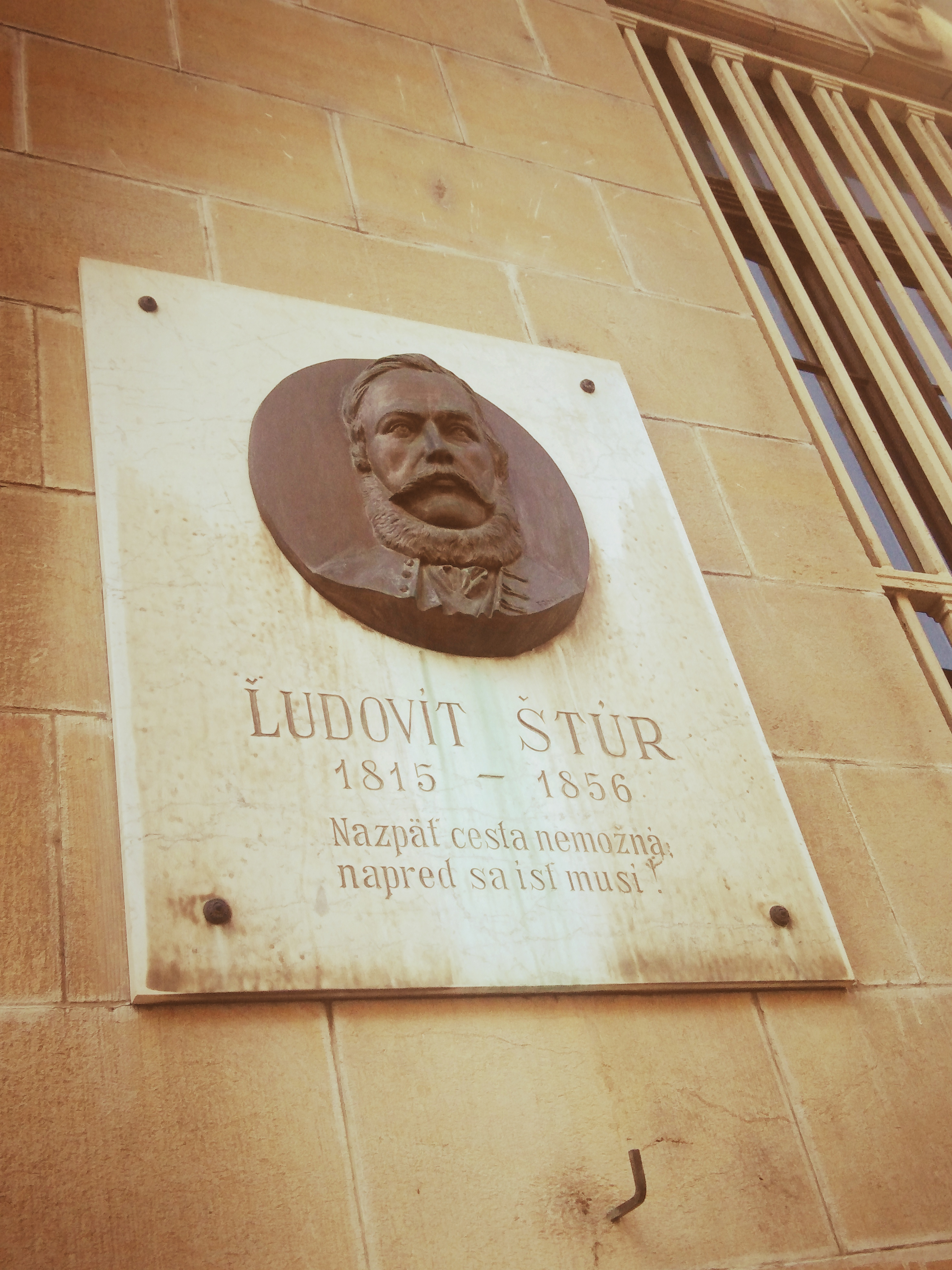
Ľudovít Štúr plaque on Štúr Street (Štúrova ulica) in Bratislava

Ľudovít Štúr was born on 28 October 1815 in Zayugróc, Kingdom of Hungary, Austrian Empire (now Uhrovec, Slovakia; in the same house where Alexander Dubček was later born) as the second child of Samuel and Anna Štúr. He was baptised in the Evangelical Lutheran church in Uhrovec. He acquired his basic education, including the study of Latin, from his father Samuel, who was a teacher. From 1827 to 1829, he studied in Győr, where he attended a lower grammar school. There, he improved his knowledge of history and the German, Greek, and Hungarian languages. These studies inspired his admiration of Pavel Jozef Šafárik, Ján Kollár and Jiří Dobrovsky. In 1829, he decided to change schools.

From 1829 to 1836, Ľudovít Štúr studied at the prestigious Lutheran Lýceum (preparatory high school and college) in Pressburg (modern-day Bratislava) and became a member of the Czech-Slav Society, which stimulated his interest in all Slav nations. The Lýceum boasted a renowned professor, Juraj Palkovič, in the Department of the Czecho-Slav Language and Ancient Literature, the only department at a Protestant school of higher education in 19th century Hungary.

In 1831, Ľudovít Štúr wrote his first poems. From January to September 1834, he temporarily interrupted his studies due to a lack of finances, and returned to Uhrovec, where he worked as a scribe for Count Károly Zay. Later that year, he resumed his studies, was active in the historical and literary circle of the Czech-Slav Society, was responsible for correspondence with members of the Society, gave private lessons in the house of a merchant in Pressburg (Bratislava), taught younger students at the Lýceum, and established contacts with important foreign and Czech scholars. On 17 December 1834, he was elected secretary of the Czech-Slav Society at the Lýceum.

=== Slovak national movement ===
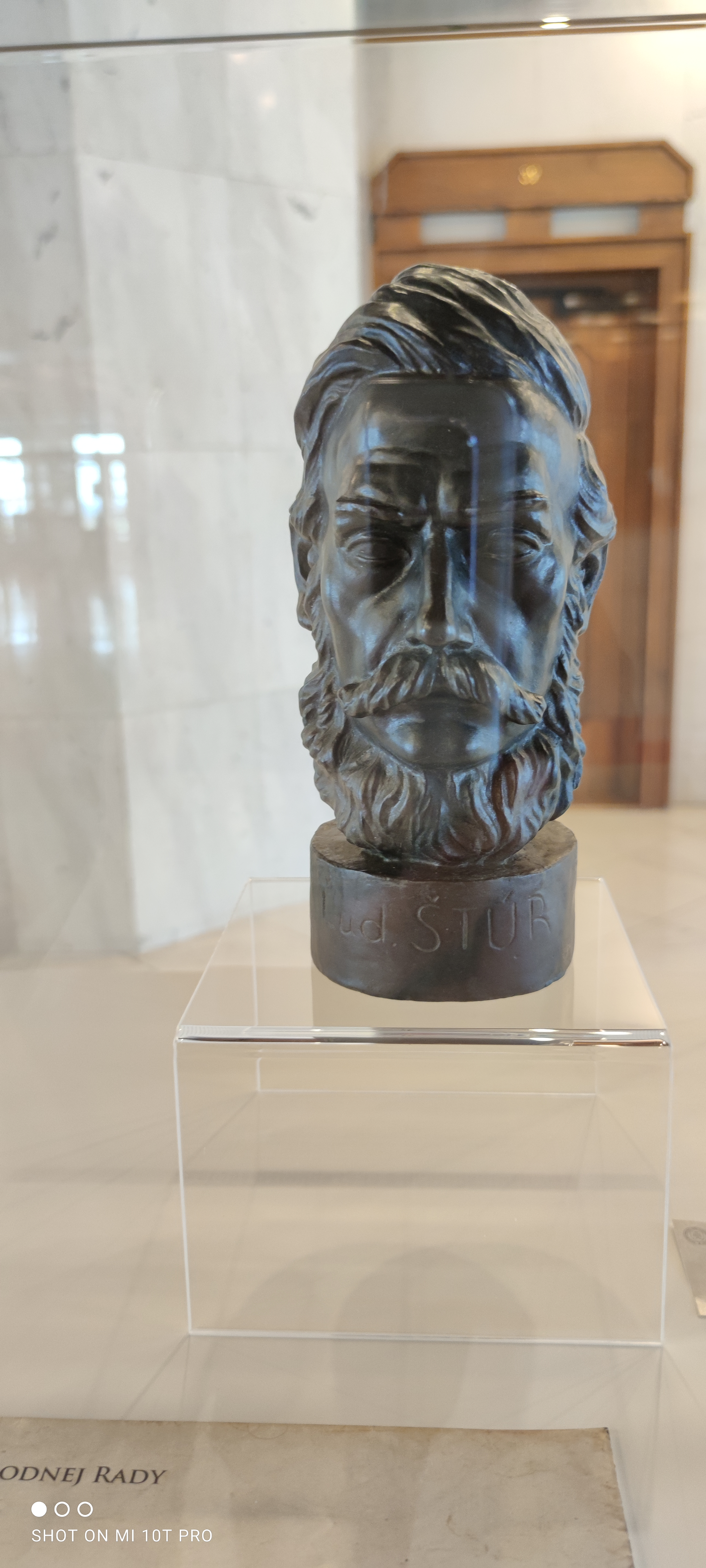
Bust of Ľudovít Štúr in the National Council of the Slovak Republic

In May 1835, Ľudovít Štúr persuaded Jozef Miloslav Hurban to become involved in the Slovak national movement. Also that year, he was co-editor of the Plody ("Fruits") almanac, a compilation of the best works of the members of the Czech-Slav Society, including poems of Štúr's. He became vice-president of the Czech-Slav Society, teaching older students at the Lýceum the history of the Slavs and their literatures.

In 1836, Štúr wrote a letter to Czech historian František Palacký, in which he stated that the Czech language used by the Protestants in Upper Hungary had become incomprehensible for ordinary Slovaks, and proposed the creation of a unified Czechoslovak language, provided that the Czechs would be willing to use some Slovak words – just like Slovaks would officially accept some Czech words. But the Czechs were unwilling to accept this, so Štúr and his friends decided to introduce a completely new Slovak language standard instead. On 24 April 1836, a trip to Devín Castle (Dévény, now part of Bratislava) by the members of the Slovak national movement took place, led by Štúr as the vice-president of the Czech-Slav Society. The beginning of his group's extensive efforts on behalf of national awareness are linked to this visit to the ruins of Devín Castle, woven together with legends and reminders of Great Moravia. There, The members of the Czech-Slav Society swore to be true to the national cause, deciding to travel around Upper Hungary to drum up support for their ideas. At the castle, they also adopted additional Slavic names (e.g., Jozef Hurban became Jozef Miloslav Hurban, etc.).

From 1836 to 1838, as deputy (non-stipendiary assistant) for Professor Palkovič, Chair of the Czechoslovak Language and Literature Department at the Lýceum where he was previously a student, he taught History of Slavic Literature. He continued to write poetry and under his leadership, the number of members of the Czech-Slav Society continuously increased. In this year, a poem of Štúr's was published in printed form for the first time: Óda na Hronku ("An ode to Hronka"). In April 1837, the Czech-Slav Society was banned due to a commotion between students at the Lýceum. One week later, Štúr founded the Institute of the Czechoslovak Language and Literature, within which the activities of the Czech-Slav Society continued. In that year, he continued to write articles for newspapers and journals, including Tatranka, Hronka, Květy (Czech), Časopis českého musea, Danica (Croatian) and Tygodnik literacki (Polish).

=== Travels in Germany and early political works ===
From 1838 to 1840, he attended the (Protestant) University of Halle in Germany, where he studied linguistics, history, and philosophy. He was influenced by the works of the German philosophers Georg Wilhelm Friedrich Hegel and Johann Gottfried Herder. Also during this period, his poetic cycle Dumky večerní ("Evening Thoughts", written in Czech) was published in the Czech journal Květy. He left Pressburg for Halle in September 1838. On his way to Halle, he spent more than a month in Prague, in the company of Czech patriots. In the spring of 1839, Štúr made a long journey to the Upper and Lower Lusatia in Germany (inhabited by Slavs) and got in touch with the Slavs there. He wrote the short travelogue Cesta do Lužic vykonaná na jar 1839 ("A journey to Lusatia made in the spring of 1839"), written in Czech and published in the Czech journal Časopis českého musea.

In 1840, he returned to Bratislava via Prague and Hradec Králové (Königgrätz), where he spent some time in the house of publisher Jan Pospíšil. From October, he was once again working as deputy for Professor Palkovič at the Department of the Czecho-Slav Language and Literature at the Evangelical Lutheran Lýceum, teaching courses of grammar and Slav history, and continuing his activities at the Institute of the Czechoslovak Language.

During 1841–1844, Štúr was co-editor of Palkovič's literary magazine, Tatranka. In 1841, he started activities aimed at publishing a Slovak political newspaper. He wrote defenses and polemic texts, as well as his Starý a nový věk Slovákov ("The old and the new age of the Slovaks"), written in Old Czech and published in 1935 (not in Slovak until 1994). On 16 August 1841, Štúr and his friends ascended Kriváň (a symbolic mountain in Slovak culture), an event that is now commemorated by annual excursions to its summit. In 1842, he initiated the first Slovenský prestolný prosbopis, a Slovak petition to the Royal Court in Vienna requiring the government to stop national persecutions by the Hungarians in Upper Hungary. His application for a licence to publish a newspaper was turned down in the same year.

=== Codification of the Slovak language ===
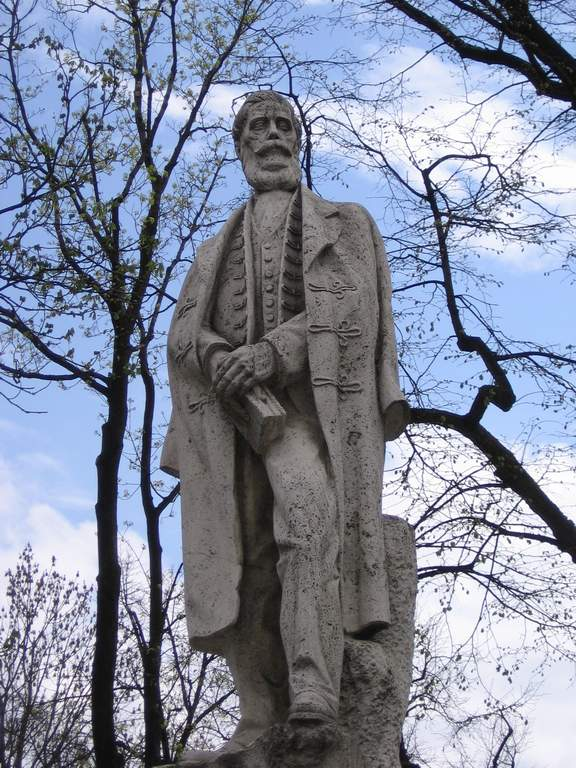
Ľudovít Štúr Monument, Levoča

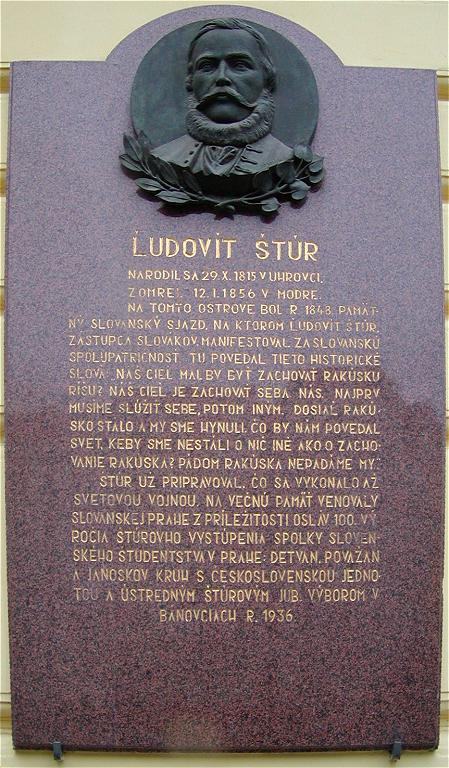
Ľudovít Štúr monument at Žofín in Prague

On 2 February 1843, in Pressburg, Štúr and his friends decided to create a new Slovak language standard (later used as a basis for contemporary literary Slovak), based on central Slovak dialects – a common language that would unify all Slovaks speaking many different dialects. From 26 to 29 June 1843, a special committee met to investigate the Institute of Czechoslovak Language at the Lýceum, also interrogating Štúr.

In July 1843, his defense, Die Beschwerden und Klagen der Slaven in Ungarn über die gesetzwidrigen Übergriffe der Magyaren ("The complaints and grievances of the Slavs in Hungary about the illegal malfeasances of the Hungarians"), which editorial offices throughout 19th century Hungary had refused to publish, was published in Leipzig, Germany. From 11 to 16 July 1843, at the parish house of J. M. Hurban in Hlboké, the leaders of the Slovak national movement – Štúr, J. M. Hurban, and M.M. Hodža – agreed on how to codify the new Slovak language standard and how to introduce it to the public. On 17 July 1843, they visited Ján Hollý, an important writer and representative of the older Bernolák Slovak language standard, in Dobrá Voda and informed him about their plans. On 11 October 1843, although the committee did not find anything illegal about Štúr's activities, Štúr was ordered to stop lecturing and was removed from the function of deputy for Prof. Palkovič. However, Štúr continued to give lectures. On 31 December 1843, he was definitively deprived of the function of deputy for Prof. Palkovič. As a result, in March 1844, 22 students left Pressburg in protest; 13 of them went to study at the Evangelical Lýceum in the town of Levoča (Lőcse). One of the supporting students was Janko Matuška, who took the opportunity to write a hymn, "Nad Tatrou sa blýska", which later became the official anthem of the Slovak Republic.

From 1843 to 1847, Štúr worked as a private linguist. In 1844, he wrote Nárečja slovenskuo alebo potreba písaňja v tomto nárečí ("The Slovak dialect or, the necessity of writing in this dialect"). On 19 May 1844, a second Slovenský prestolný prosbopis was sent to Vienna, but had little influence. But in 1844, other Slovak authors (often Štúr's students) started to use the new Slovak language standard. On 27 August, he participated in the founding convention of the Slovak association Tatrín, the first nationwide association.

On 1 August 1845, the first issue of Slovenskje národňje novini ("Slovak National Newspaper", published until 9 June 1848) was published. One week later, its literary supplement, Orol Tatranský ("The Tatra Eagle", published until 6 June 1848) was also published. In this newspaper, written in the new Slovak language, he gradually shaped a Slovak political program. He based this on the precept that the Slovaks were one nation, and that they therefore had a right to their own language, culture, schools – and particularly to political autonomy within Hungary. The projected expression of this autonomy was to be a Slovak Diet. Also that year, his brochure Das neunzehnte Jahrhundert und der Magyarismus ("The 19th century and Magyarism"), written in German, was published in Vienna.

=== Career in the Hungarian Diet ===
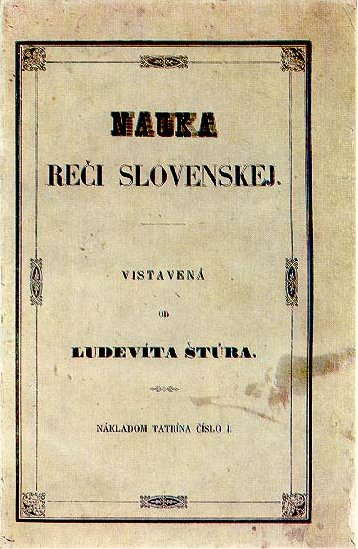
Nauka reči slovenskej, his most important work

In 1846, Štúr got to know the well-situated noble family Ostrolúcky in Zemianske Podhradie (Nemesváralja), who later helped him to become a deputy in the Diet of Hungary in Pressburg. In addition, his books Nárečja Slovenskuo alebo potreba písaňja v tomto nárečí (1844) and Nauka reči Slovenskej ("The Theory of the Slovak language") were published in Pressburg. In Nárečia Slovenskuo, he rebutted Kollár's concept of only four Slavic tribes (Russians, Poles, Czechoslovaks and Southern Slavs), and listed reasons for the introduction of the new language, which was based on central Slovak dialects and used phonetic spelling. In Nauka reči Slovenskej, he explained the grammar of the new language standard. In the same year, the upset Kollár and his followers published the compilation work Hlasové o potřebě jednoty spisovného jazyka pro Čechy, Moravany a Slováky ("Voices in favour of the necessity of a unified literary language of the Czechs, Moravians and Slovaks"), written in Czech.

In August 1847, at the 4th convention of the Tatrín association in Čachtice, Catholics and Protestants proclaimed that they "definitively agree to use only the newly codified Štúr language standard". On 30 October 1847, he became an ablegate for the town of Zvolen (Zólyom) in the "Parlamentum Publicum" (Diet) in Pressburg. From 17 November 1847 to 13 March 1848, he gave five important speeches at the Diet, in which he demanded the abolition of serfdom in Hungary, the introduction of civil rights, and the use of the Slovak language in elementary schools. The Diet met only until 11 April 1848 due to the 1848 Revolution.

=== 1848/49 Revolution ===
On 1 April 1848 in Vienna, Štúr and his colleagues prepared the Slavic Congress of Prague. On 20 April 1848, he arrived in Prague on the invitation of the Czech Josef Václav Frič, where he won the support of Czech student members of the association Slávie, regarding his attempts to enforce the Slovak language. On 30 April 1848, he initiated the establishment of "Slovanská lipa" (Slavic linden tree) in Prague – an association aimed at promoting the mutual cooperation of Slavs.

In May 1848, he was a co-author of the official petition, Žiadosti slovenského národa ("Requirements of the Slovak Nation"). The Žiadosti slovenského národa were publicly declared in Liptovský Svätý Mikuláš, with Ján Francisci-Rimavský as the reader. In it, the Slovaks demanded autonomy within Hungary, proportional representation in the Hungarian Assembly, the creation of a Slovak Diet to administer their own region, for Slovak to become the official language, and for educational institutions at all levels to use Slovak. They also called for universal suffrage and democratic rights – e.g., freedom of the press and public assembly. They requested that peasants be released from serfdom, and that their lands be returned to them. But on 12 May 1848, the Hungarian government issued a warrant for the leaders of the Slovak movement: Štúr, Hurban, and Hodža. The persecuted Štúr arrived in Prague on 31 May 1848. On 2 June 1848, he participated in the Slavic Congress there.

On 19 June 1848, he went to Zagreb, Croatia, because the Slavic Congress was interrupted by fighting in Prague, and became an editor of the Croatian magazine Slavenski Jug. With financial support from some Serbs, he and J. M. Hurban started to prepare an uprising against the Hungarian government. The "Slovak Uprising" occurred between September 1848 and November 1849. In September 1848, Štúr travelled to Vienna and participated in preparations for the Slovak armed uprising. On 15–16 September 1848, the Slovak National Council, the supreme Slovak political and military organisation, consisting of Štúr, Hurban, and Hodža (as politicians), and the Czechs B. Bloudek, F. Zach, and B. Janeček (as military experts), was created in Vienna. On 19 September 1848 in Myjava, the Slovak National Council declared independence from the Hungarian government and called on the Slovak nation to start an armed uprising. However, the council only managed to control their local region.

Štúr, Hurban, and others met in Prague on 7 October 1848 to discuss how to proceed with the uprising. Upon his return to Vienna in November, Štúr (with a group of Slovak volunteers, on one of the so-called Volunteer Campaigns) traversed northern Hungary from Čadca (Csaca), arriving in Prešov (Eperjes) in March 1849. On 20 March 1849, he led a delegation to meet with the Austrian king in the Czech town of Olomouc and presented the demands of the Slovak nation. From March until June, Štúr – along with Hurban, Hodža, Bórik, Chalúpka, and others – negotiated in Vienna for a solution to the Slovak demands. But on 21 November 1849, the Slovak volunteer corps was officially demobilised in Pressburg, and the disappointed Štúr retreated to his parents' home in Uhrovec.

=== Later life ===
The later years of Štúr's life saw him engage in further linguistic and literary work. In the autumn of 1850, he attempted but failed to receive a license to publish a Slovak national newspaper. In December of that year, he participated in a delegation to Vienna concerning Slovak schools and the Tatrín association. Several personal tragedies also occurred during his later life. His brother Karol died on 13 January 1851. Štúr moved into the house of Karol's family in Modra (near Pressburg) to care for his seven children. He lived there under police supervision. On 27 July 1851, his father died, and his mother moved to Trenčín (Trencsén).

In October 1851, he participated in meetings in Pressburg concerning reforms of the codified Slovak language standard. The reforms, involving mainly a transition from the phonetic spelling to an etymological one, were later introduced by M. M. Hodža and Martin Hattala in 1851–1852, but Štúr, among others, also participated in the preparations. The result of these reforms was the Slovak language standard still in use today, with only some minor changes since then.

In Modra in 1852, Štúr finished his essay O národních písních a pověstech plemen slovanských ("On national songs and myths of Slavic kin"), written in Czech and published in Bohemia the next year. In addition, he wrote his important philosophical book, Das Slawenthum und die Welt der Zukunft ("Slavdom and the world of the future"), written in German, and published in Russian in 1867 and 1909 (subsequently published in German in 1931, and in Slovak in 1993). Among other things, he recapitulated the events that brought the Slovaks to the desperate situation of that time, and suggested cooperation with Russia as a solution, thus moving away from Slovak nationalism toward pan-Slavism.

In 1853, his platonic female friend, Adela, died in Vienna on 18 March. He went to Trenčín to help care for his ill mother until she died on 28 August. The only compilation of his poetry, Spevy a piesne ("Singings and songs"), was published in Pressburg that year. On 11 May 1854, he gave a speech at the unveiling of the Ján Hollý monument in Dobrá Voda (Ján Hollý having died in 1849). Štúr had also written a poem in his honour.

== Death ==
On 22 December 1855, Štúr accidentally shot and wounded himself during a hunt near Modra. In the last days of his life, he was mainly supported by his friend Ján Kalinčiak. On 12 January 1856, Ľudovít Štúr died in Modra. A national funeral was held there in his honour.

== Legacy ==
Štúr has been featured on Czechoslovak and Slovak banknotes throughout the 20th century. He appeared on the Czechoslovak 50 Koruna banknote of 1987 and on the Slovak 500 Koruna note from 1993 until Slovakia's adoption of the Euro in 2009.

The Ľudovít Štúr Institute of Linguistics is named after him.

The town of Parkan (Párkány in Hungarian) on the Hungarian border was renamed Štúrovo in his honour in 1948.

The asteroid 3393 Štúr, about 9.6 km in diameter and discovered on 28 November by Milan Antal at the Hungarian observatory at Piszkéstető, is named after him.

He was known for opposing Jewish emancipation and promoting the belief that Slovak Jews cannot belong to the Slovak nation.

Ľudovít Štúr is the subject of biopic Štúr, written and directed by Slovak film director Mariana Čengel Solčanská and based on her novel Milenec Adely Ostrolúckej. It was released in January 2026, in time for the 170th anniversary of Štúr's death.

== See also ==
- History of Slovakia
- History of Bratislava
