= Pálffy ab Erdöd =

Hungarian noble family

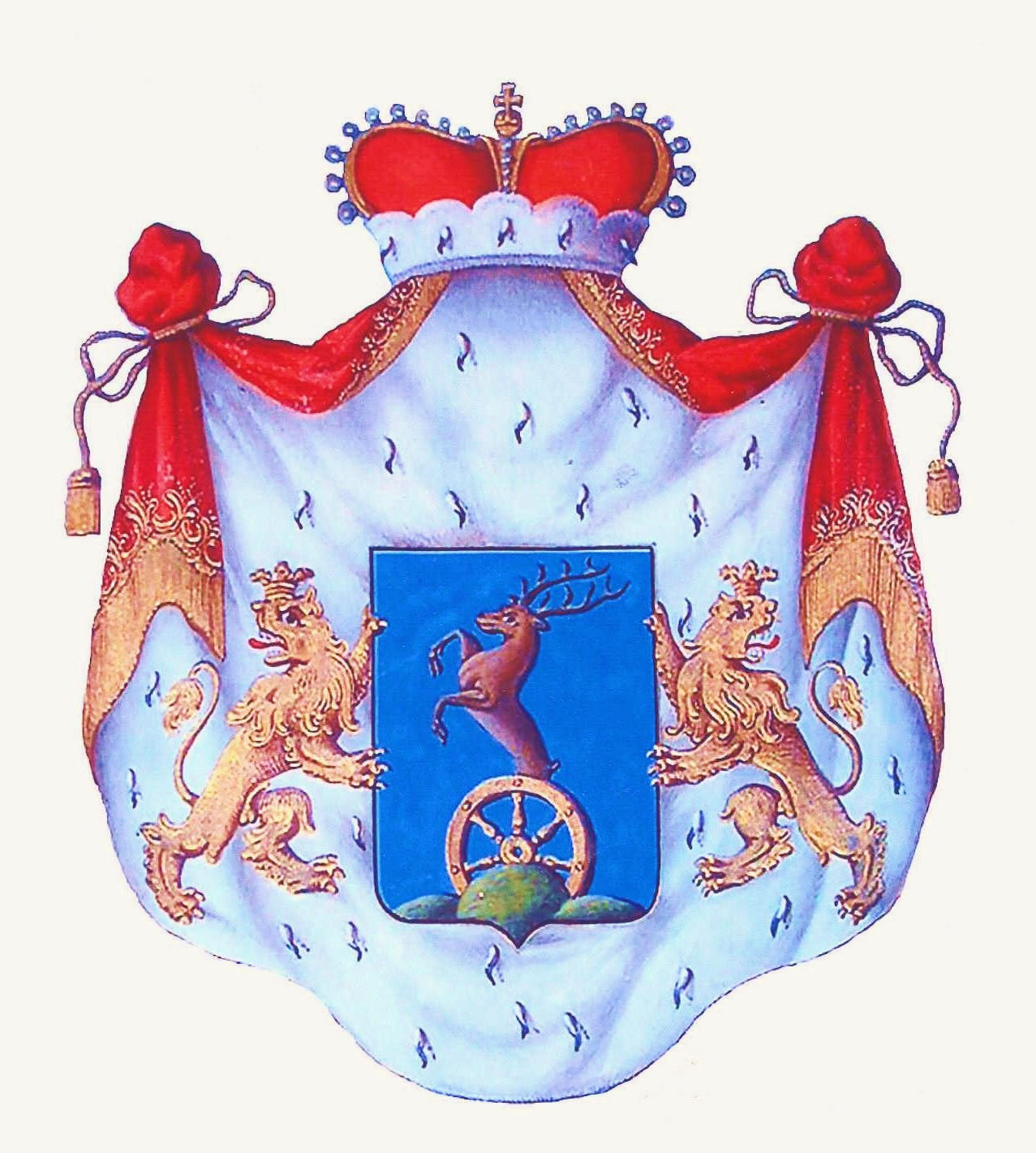
Princely arms of the Pálffy family (hart and wheel)

The House of Pálffy, also known as Pálffy von Erdőd, Pálffy de Erdőd, or Pálffy of Erdőd, is the name of an old Hungarian noble family, later incorporated into Austrian nobility. Members of the family held significant positions in the Habsburg monarchy. They became high nobility with the hereditary title of prince in 1807.

== History ==
The Hungarian name Pálffy derives from the Latin term Pauli filius (son of Paul), after the first known ancestor of the family.

Erdőd is the Hungarian name for Ardud, a town situated in Transylvania.

The Pálffy ab Erdőd family members bore as well the title of Baron or Baroness of Újezd, of the name of their Czech barony of Újezd.

The family crest is of a deer above a wooden wheel which was created supposedly after an incident in the forest. The legend says that members of the Pálffy family were travelling in a horse-drawn carriage in the forest at night and in the mist when a deer shot out from the forest and hit the side of the carriage, breaking a wheel and killing the deer. The entourage decided to stay there until morning to fix the wheel. When morning arrived and the mist had cleared, they had stopped just before a cliff edge so the family realised that deer had saved their lives. In its honour, the family crest was created.

In the 17th, 18th and 19th centuries, the family owned many castles and large residences. It's said that they owned up to 99 castles.

Károly József Jeromos Pálffy was created Prince von Palffy 1807 by the emperor Francis II, with this moment the family became part of the highest part of society of the early 19th century.

== Notable members ==
- Paul Pálffy ab Erdöd (1580/1589–1653), Palatine of Hungary, Knight of the Golden Fleece
- Nikolaus VI Graf Pálffy ab Erdöd (1657/67–1732), field marshal and Palatine of Hungary, Knight of the Golden Fleece
- Johann Bernhard Stephan, Graf Pálffy ab Erdöd (1664–1751), field marshal, Knight of the Golden Fleece
- Countess Maria Augustina Pálffy ab Erdöd (1714–1759), mother of Joseph, Count Kinsky and Franz Joseph, Count Kinsky
- Leopold, Count Pálffy-Daun von Erdöd (1716–1773), field marshal
- Karl, Count Palffy ab Erdöd (1735–1816), Knight of the Golden Fleece
- Count Ferdinand Pálffy von Erdöd (1774–1840), mining engineer and civil servant of the Austrian Empire
- Count Fidelius Pálffy ab Erdöd (1788–1864), Knight of the Golden Fleece
- Count Moritz Pálffy ab Erdöd (1812–1897), Knight of the Golden Fleece
- Count Paul Pálffy ab Erdöd (1890–1968), Hungarian sportsman
- Count Fidél Pálffy ab Erdőd (1895–1946), Hungarian politician
- Ferdinand Leopold Graf Pálffy-Daun ab Erdöd, honorary citizen of Vienna
- Count Geza Pálffy ab Erdőd, Member of parliament and resistance fighter, highlighted in the Terror Museum

== Possessions ==
Palaces in Vienna, Bratislava and Prague that bear the family name:

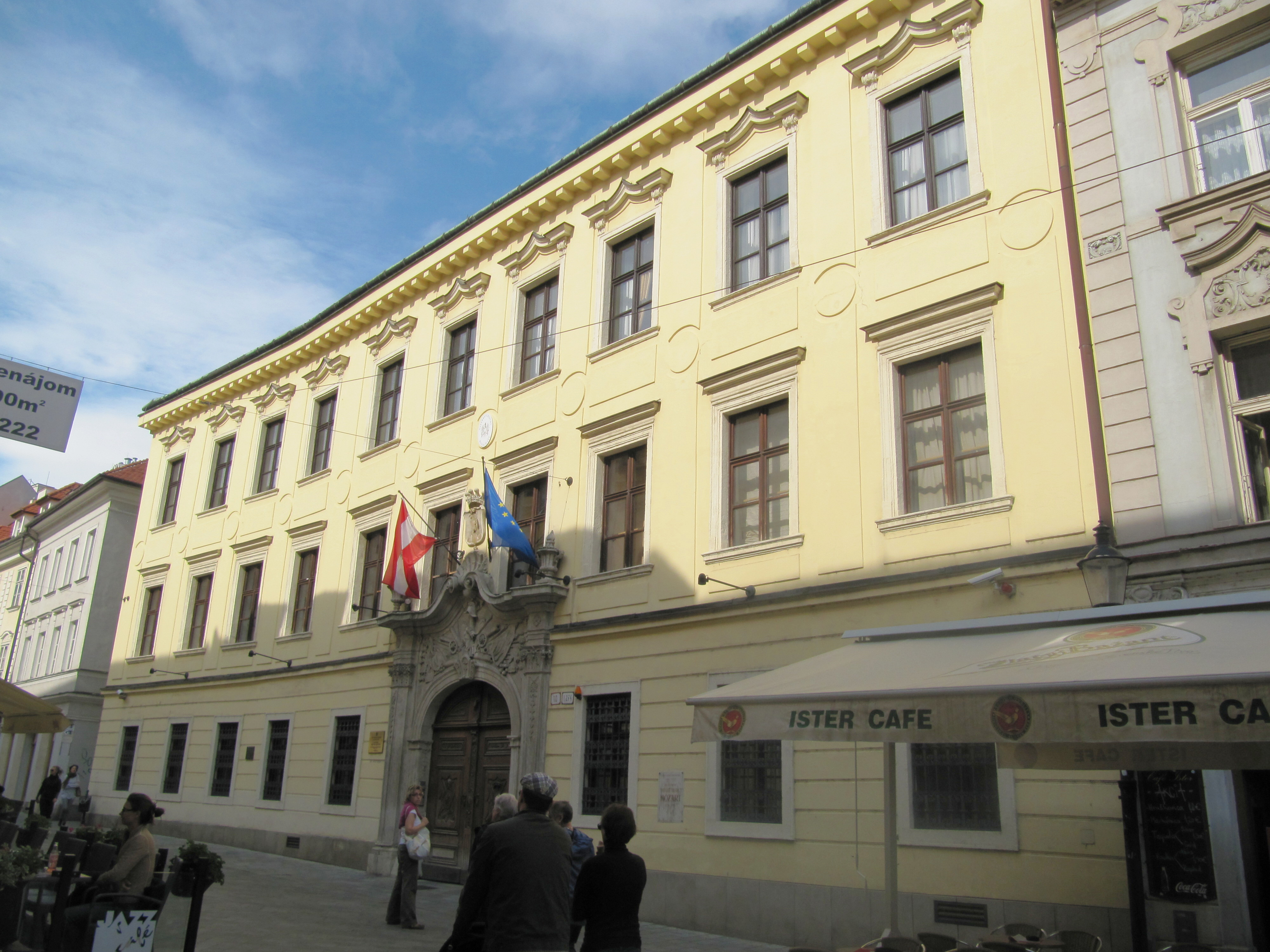
Pálffy Palace, Bratislava

- Palais Pálffy in Vienna, Innere Stadt, Josefsplatz
- Palais Pálffy in Vienna, Innere Stadt, Wallnerstraße Street
- Pálffy Palace in Bratislava, Old Town, Hviezdoslavovo námestie
- Pálffy Palace in Bratislava, Old Town, Ventúrska Street
- Pálffy Palace in Bratislava, Old Town, Panská Street
- Pálffy Palace in Bratislava, Old Town, Podhradie, Zámocká Street
- Pálffy Palace in Bratislava, Old Town, Laurinská Street
- Pálffy Palace in Bratislava, Old Town, Gorkého Street (demolished)
- Pálffy Palace in Prague, Malá Strana
- Pálffy Palace (Pálffy-kastély) in Budapest, Hungary

The Pálffy family tomb:

- Franciscan Monastery in Malacky

The castles and manors owned by the Pálffy family were:

- Devín Castle, at the confluence of the Morava and Danube rivers, Slovakia (from 1635)
- Pajštún Castle and Stupava Palace in Stupava, Slovakia, Slovakia
- Červený Kameň Castle, Slovakia (1583 to 1945)
- Plavecký Castle, Slovakia (from 1641)
- Marchegg Palace, Austria (1623 to 1957)
- Schloss Krumbach, Lower Austria (1629 to 1875)
- Neulengbach Castle, Lower Austria (1646 to 1696)
- Bojnice Castle, Slovakia (1646 to 1939)
- Stübing Palace, Austria
- Malacky Palace, Slovakia (17th to 20th centuries)
- Pezinok Palace, Slovakia (17th to 20th century)
- Burg Heidenreichstein, Lower Austria (1679 to 1947)
- Smolenice Castle, Slovakia (1777 to 1945)
- Hunting lodge Kráľová pri Senci, Slovakia
- Hunting lodge Chtelnica, Slovakia
- Pálffy Estate, Pölöskefő, Hungary
- Březnice Palace, Czechia (1872–1945)
- Slavkov Castle, Czechia (1919–1948)
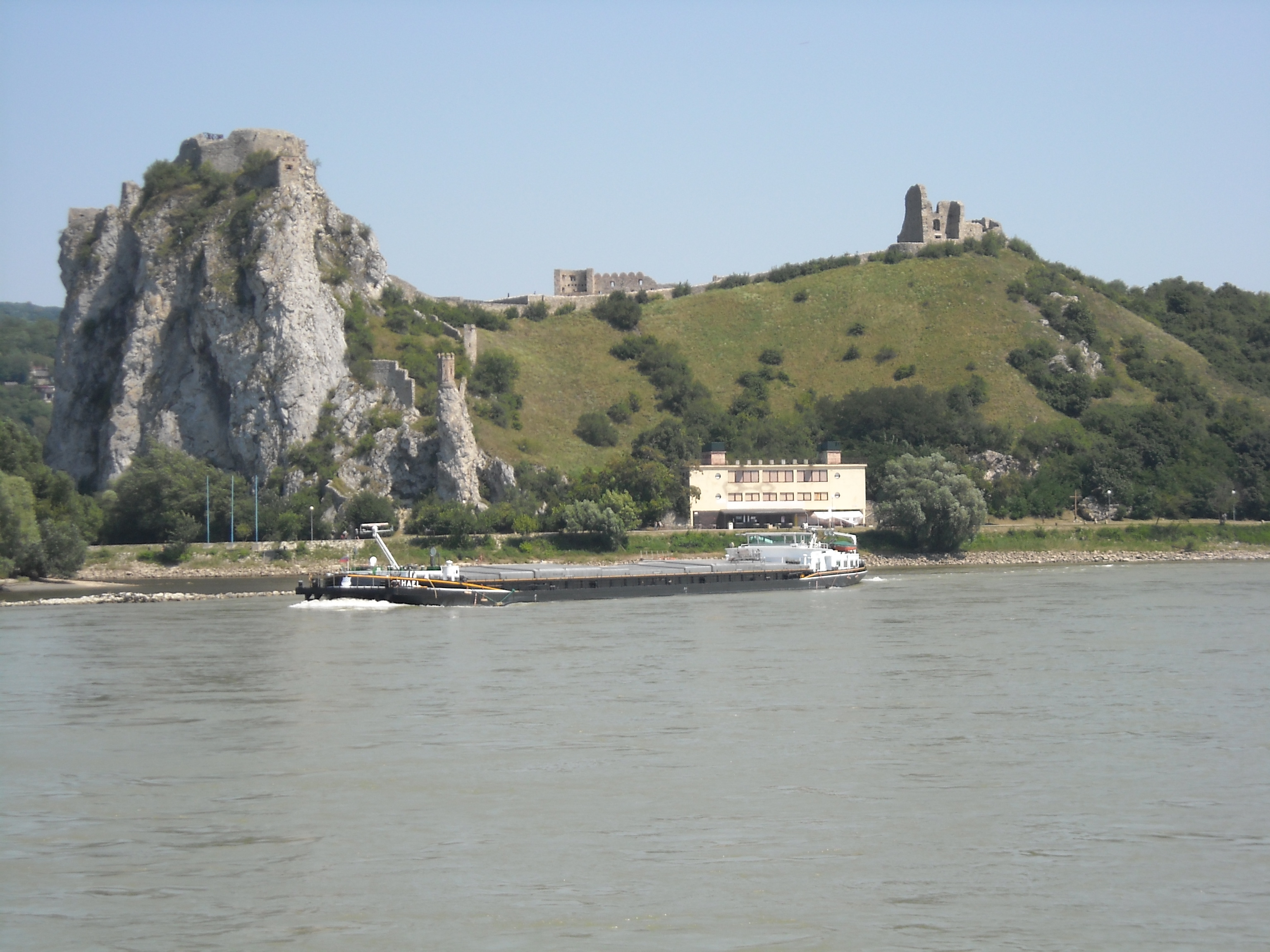
Devín Castle, Slovakia

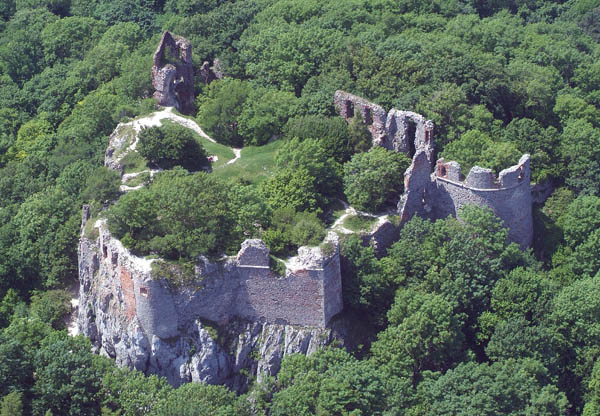
Pajštún Castle, Slovakia

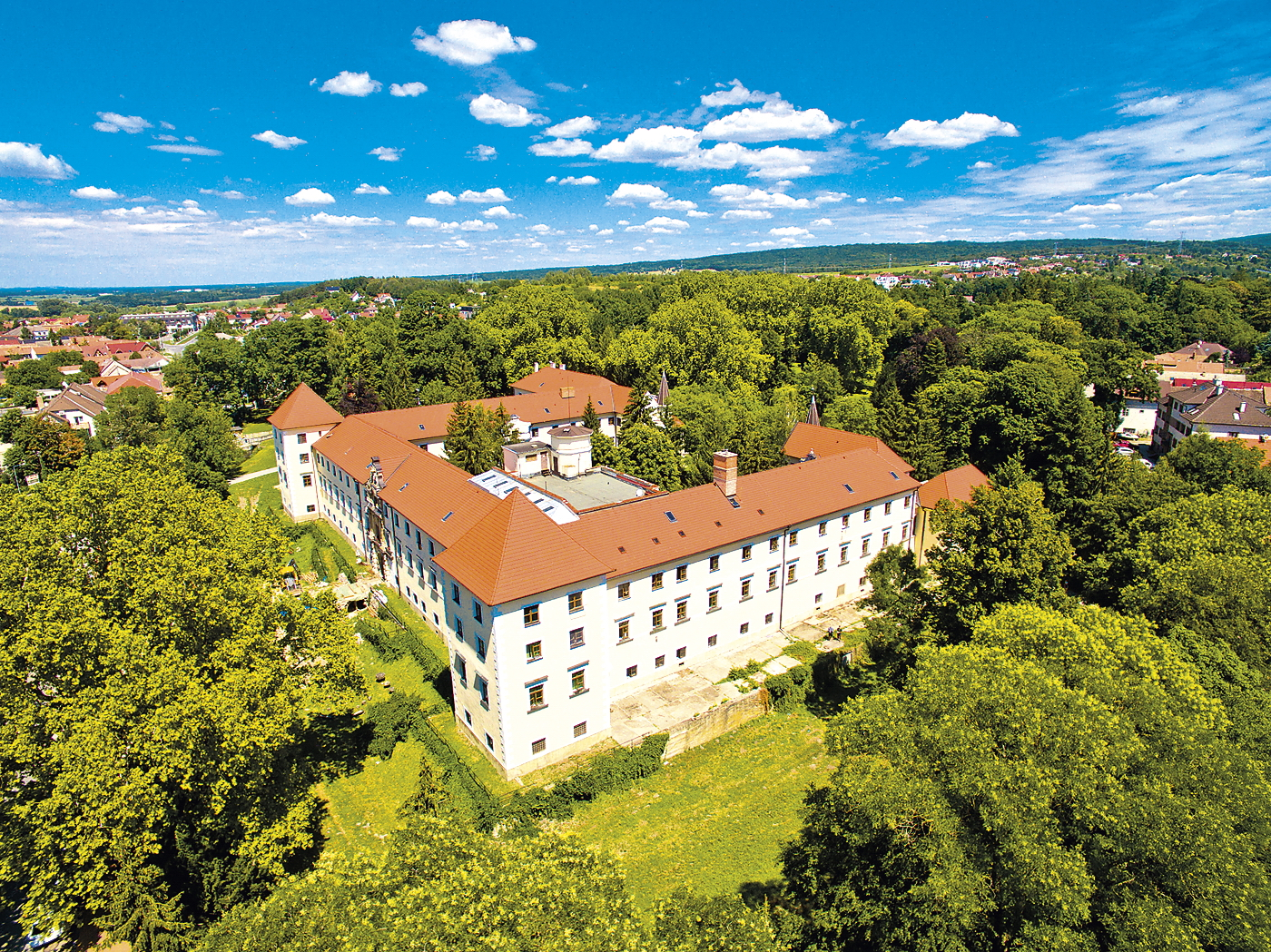
Stupava Palace, Slovakia

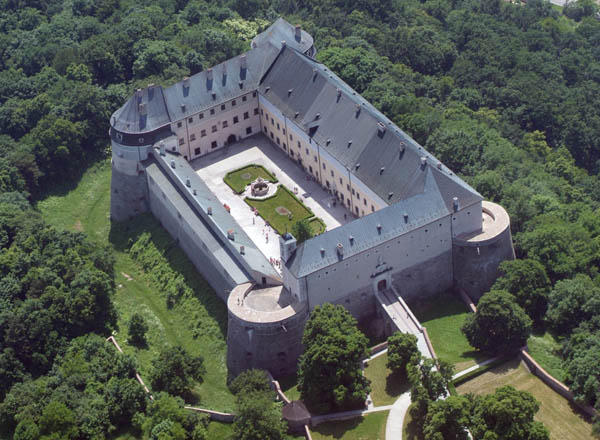
Červený Kameň Castle, Slovakia

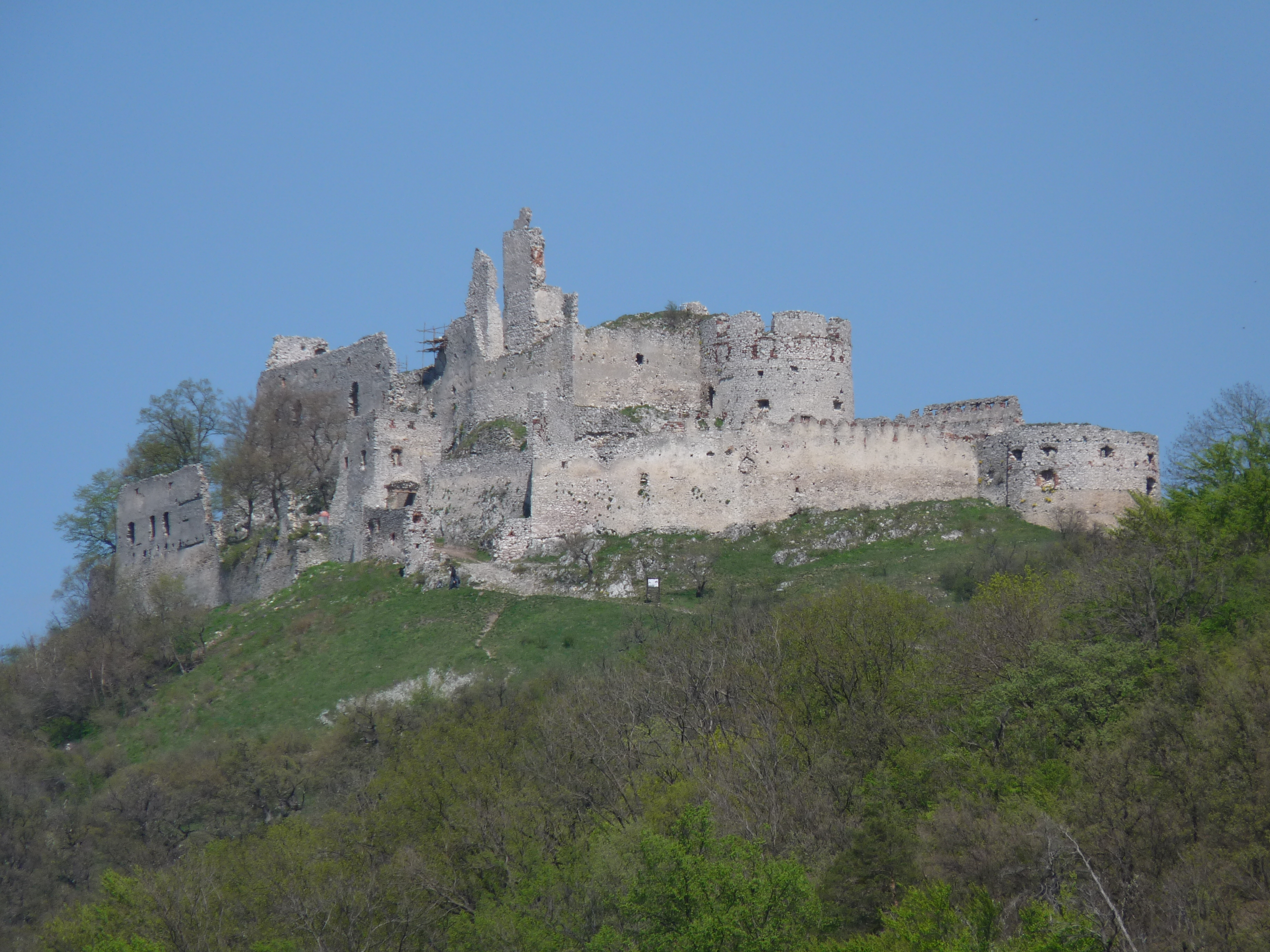
Plavecký Castle, Slovakia

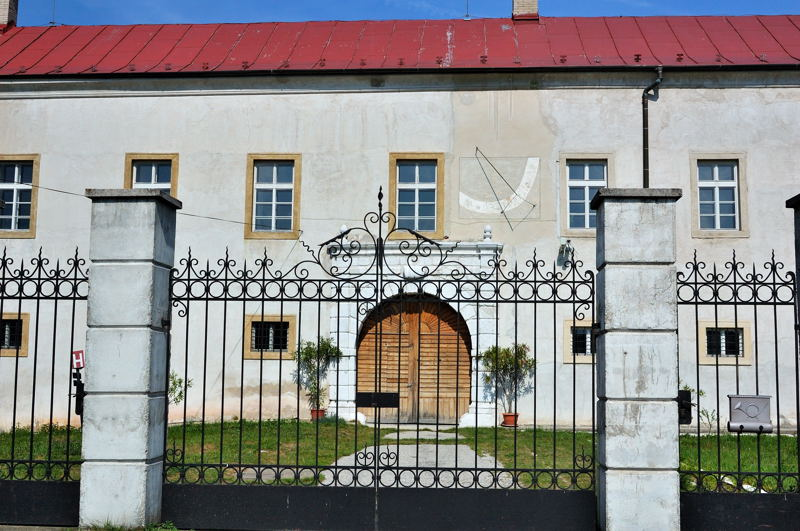
Plavecké Podhradie Palace, Slovakia

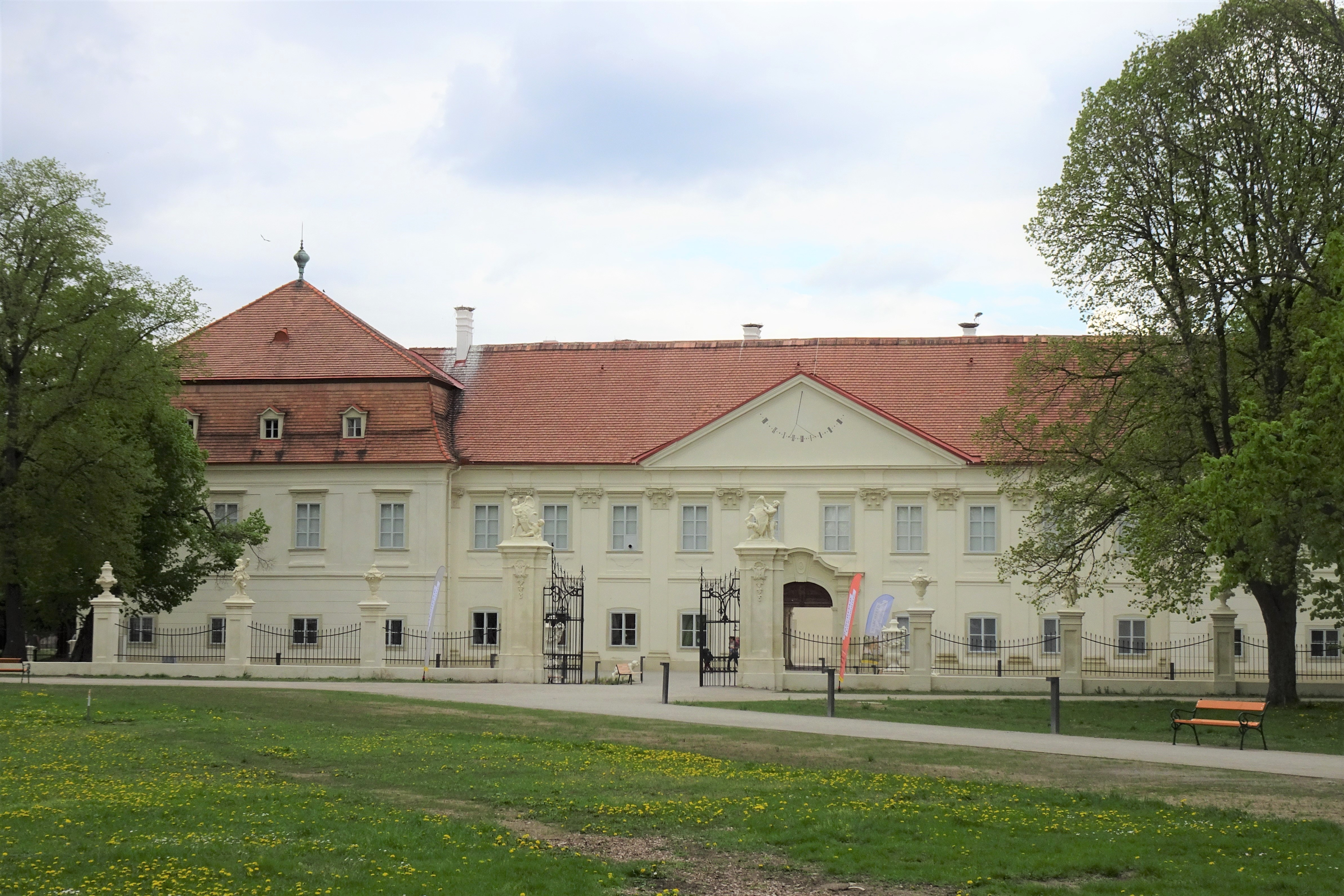
Marchegg Palace, Austria

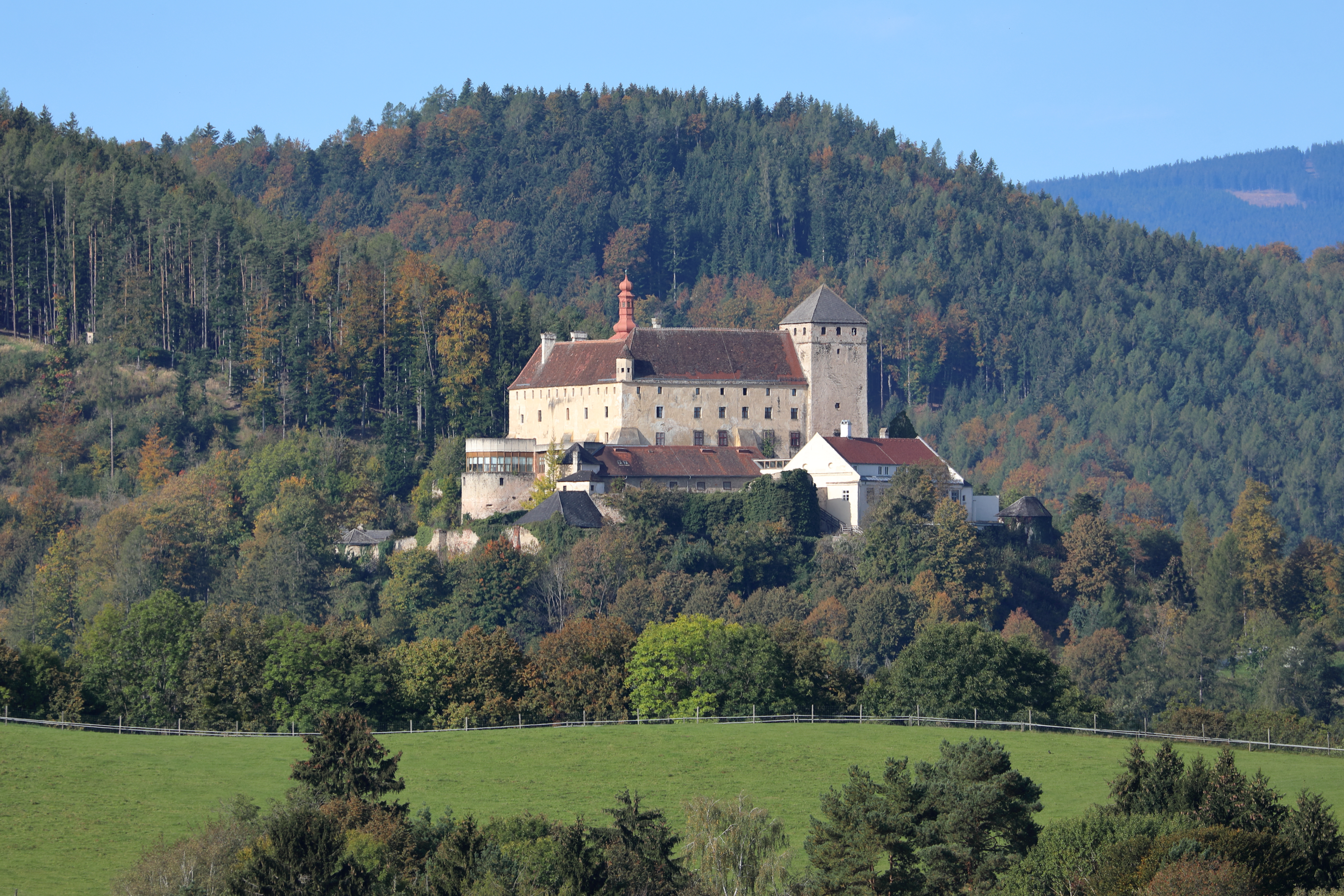
Schloss Krumbach, Austire

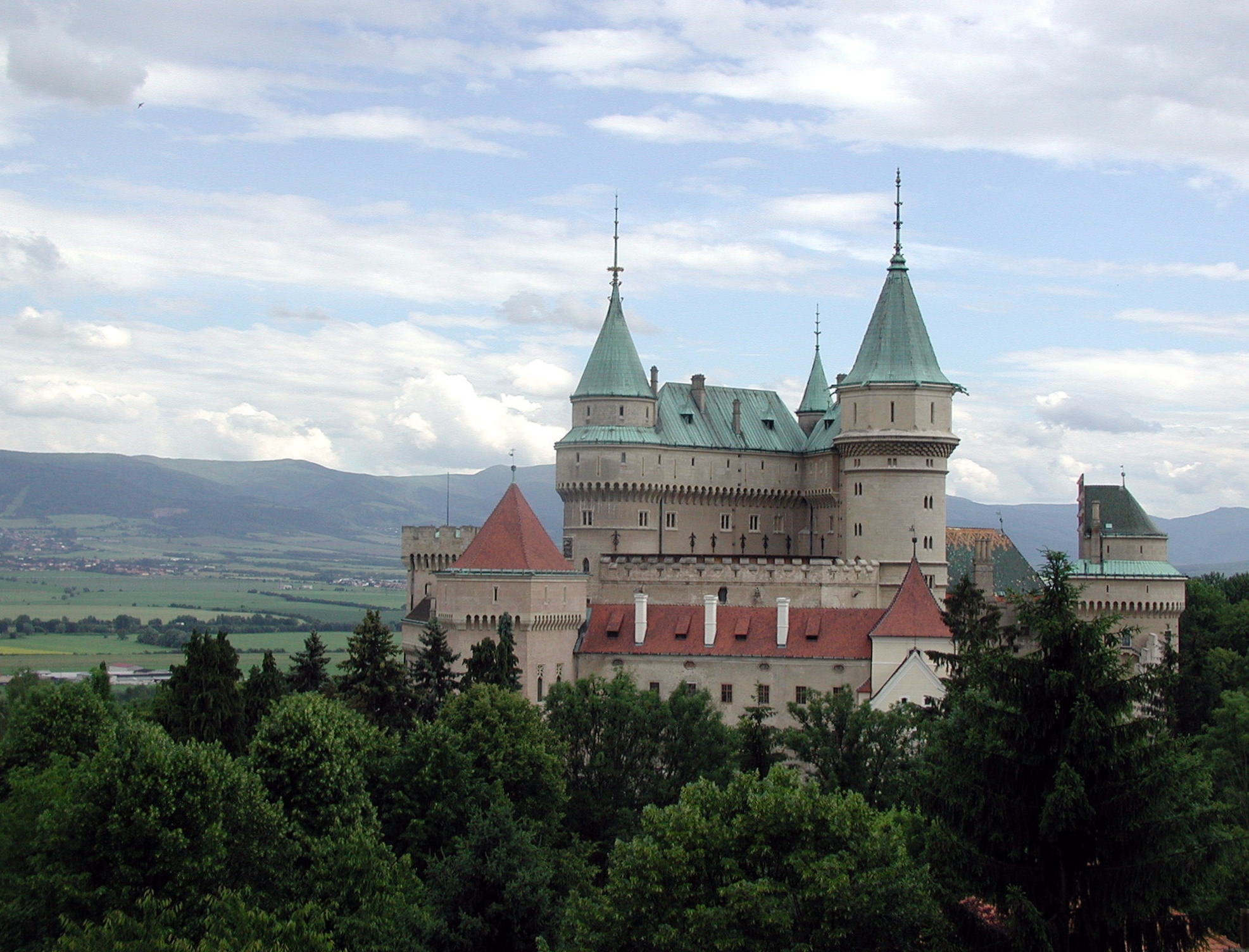
Bojnice Castle, Slovakia

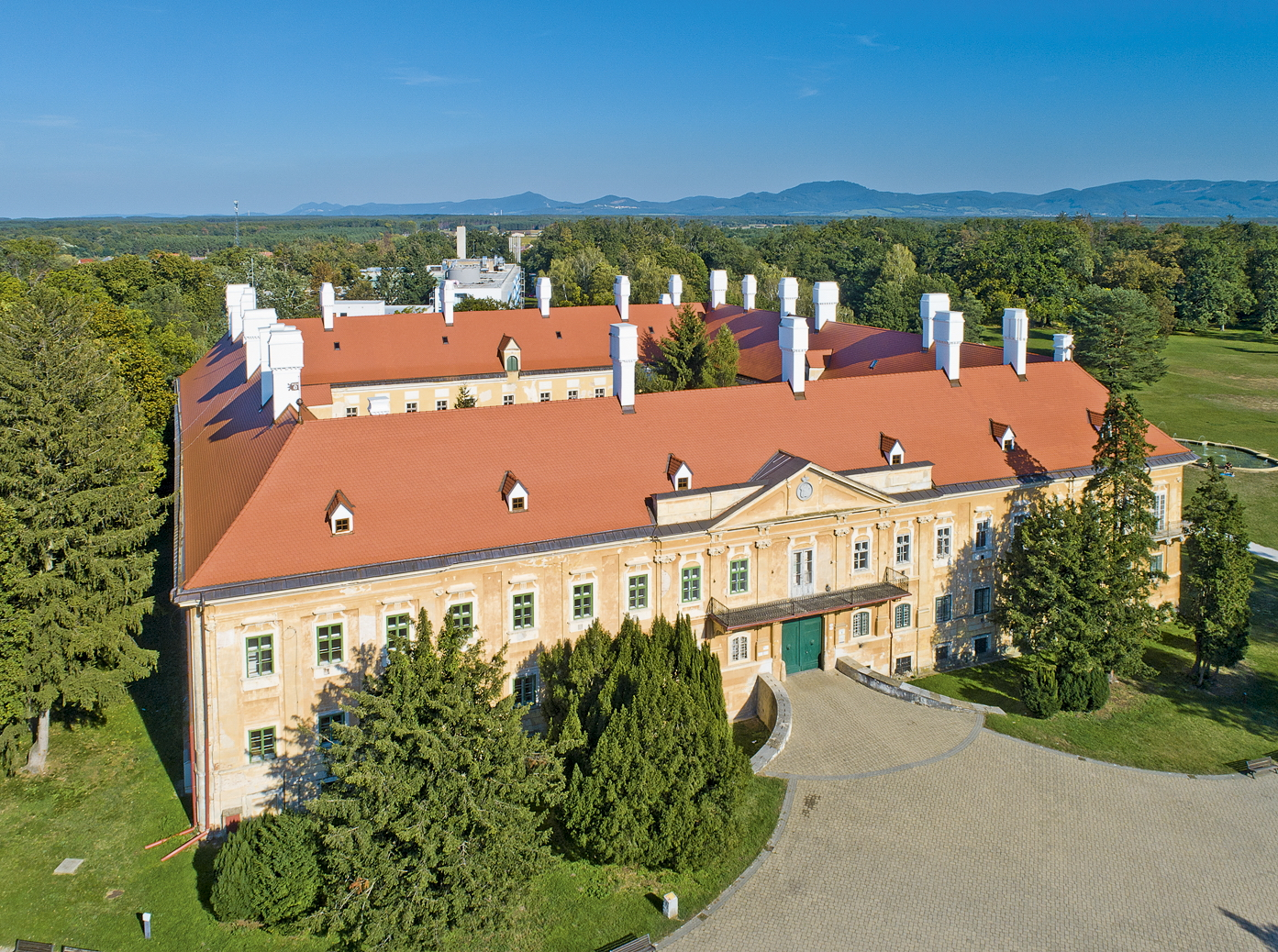
Malacky Palace, Slovakia

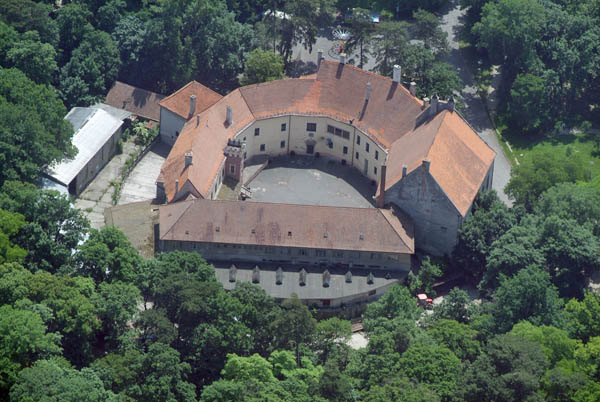
Pezinok Palace, Slovakia

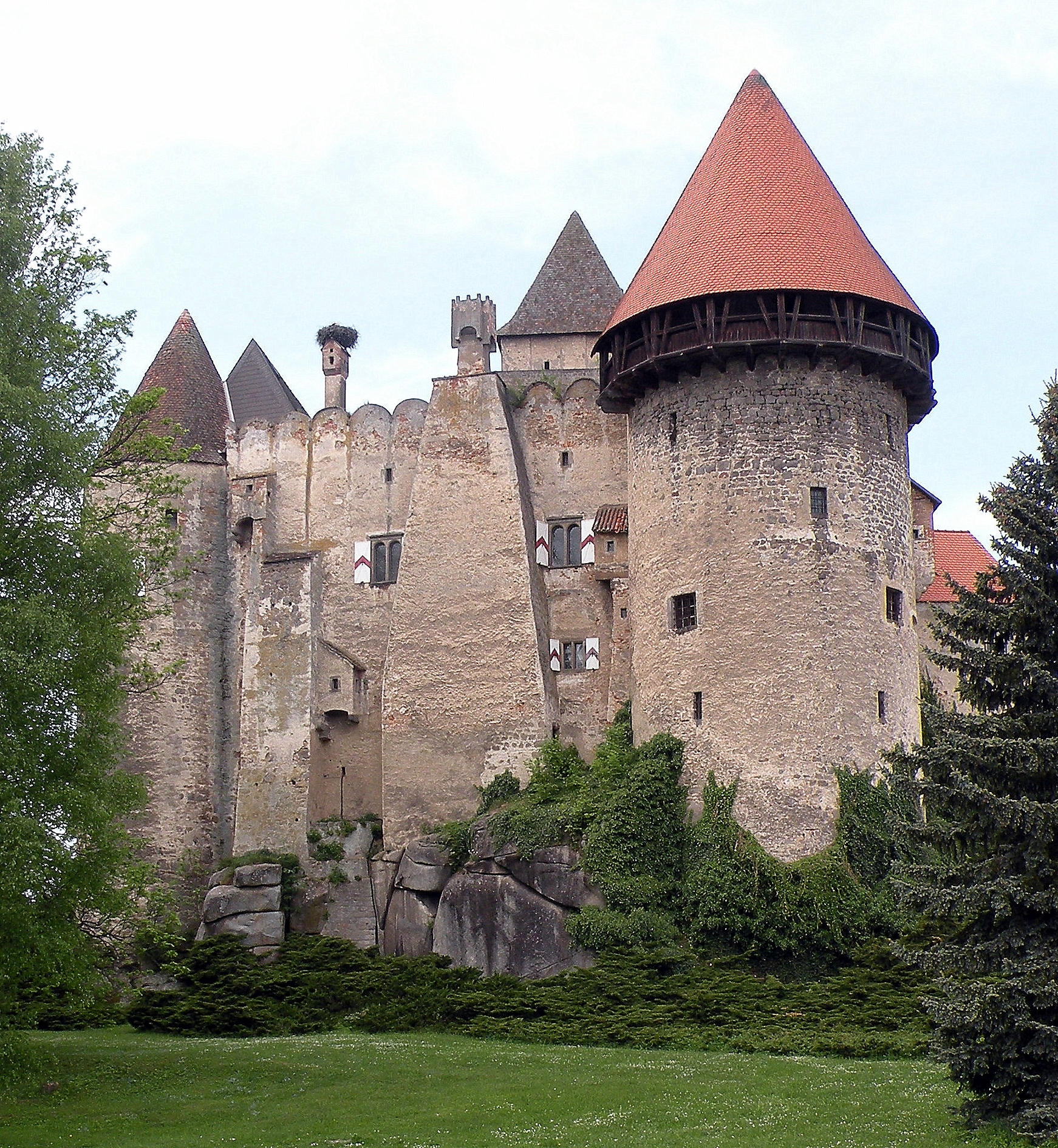
Heidenreichstein Castle, Austria

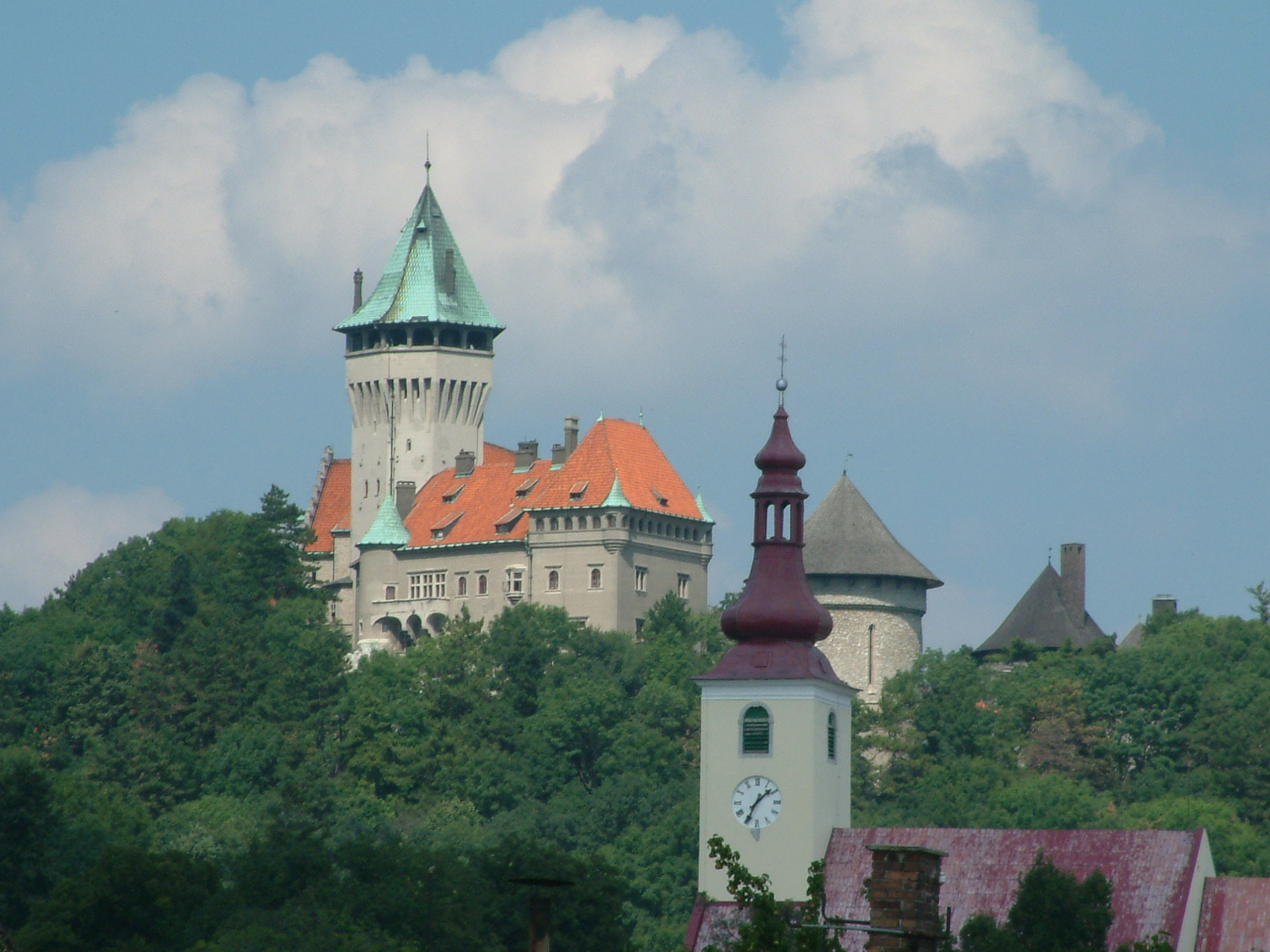
Smolenice Castle, Slovakia

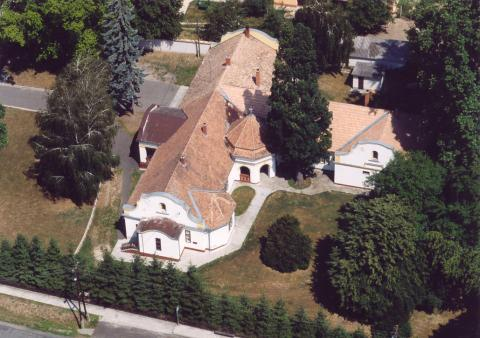
Pálffy Estate, Pölöskefő, Hungary

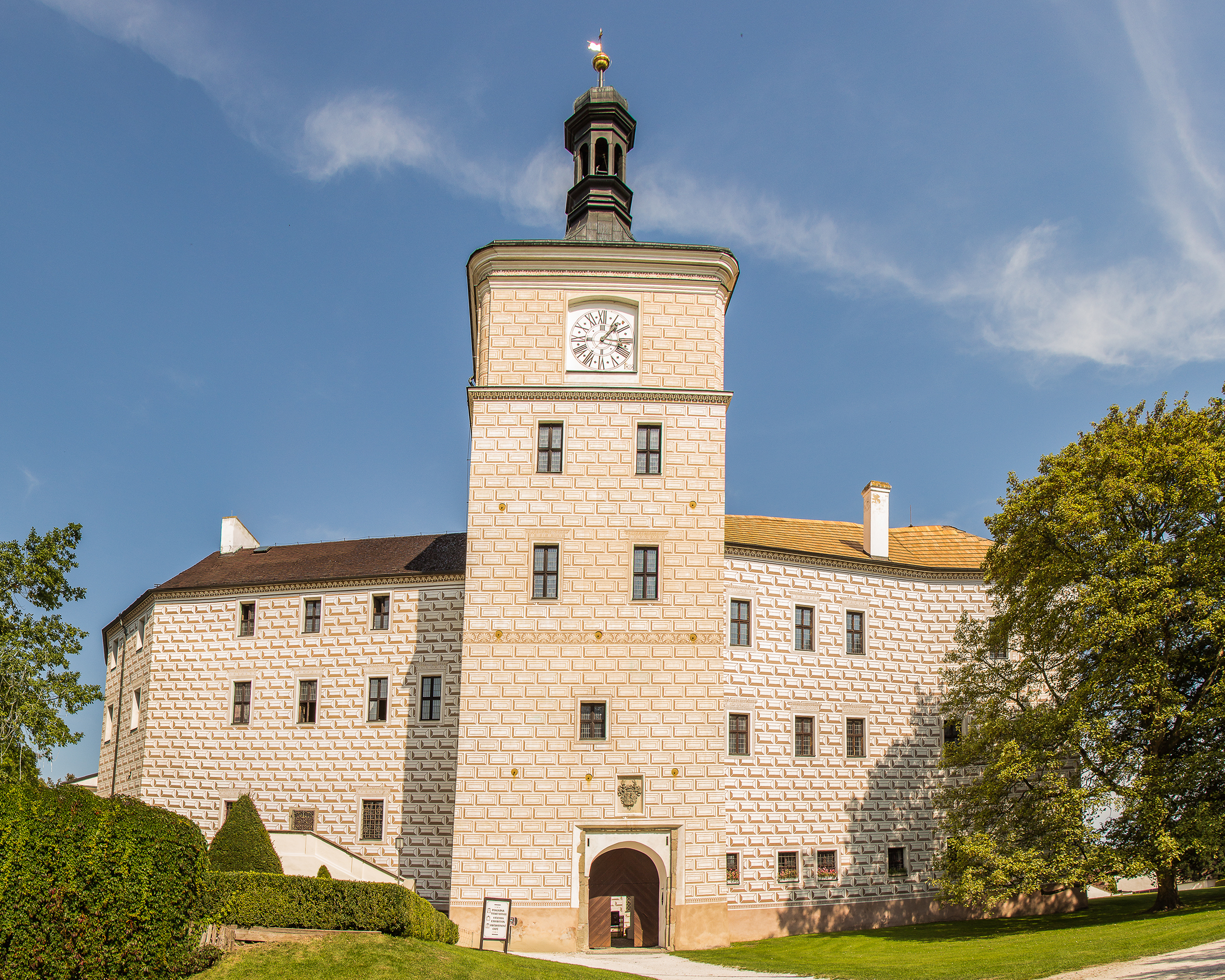
Březnice Palace, Czechia

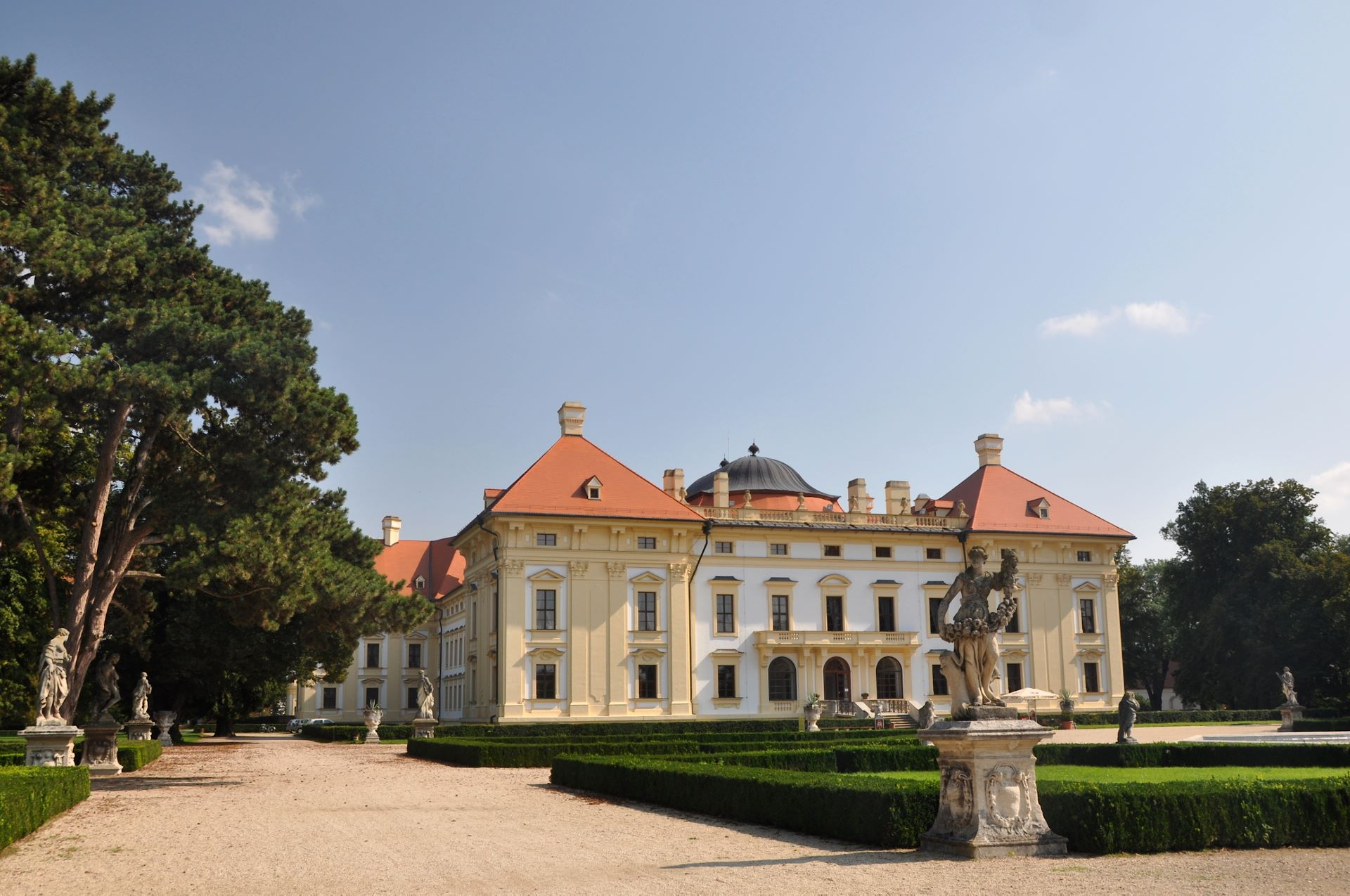
Slavkov Castle, Czechia

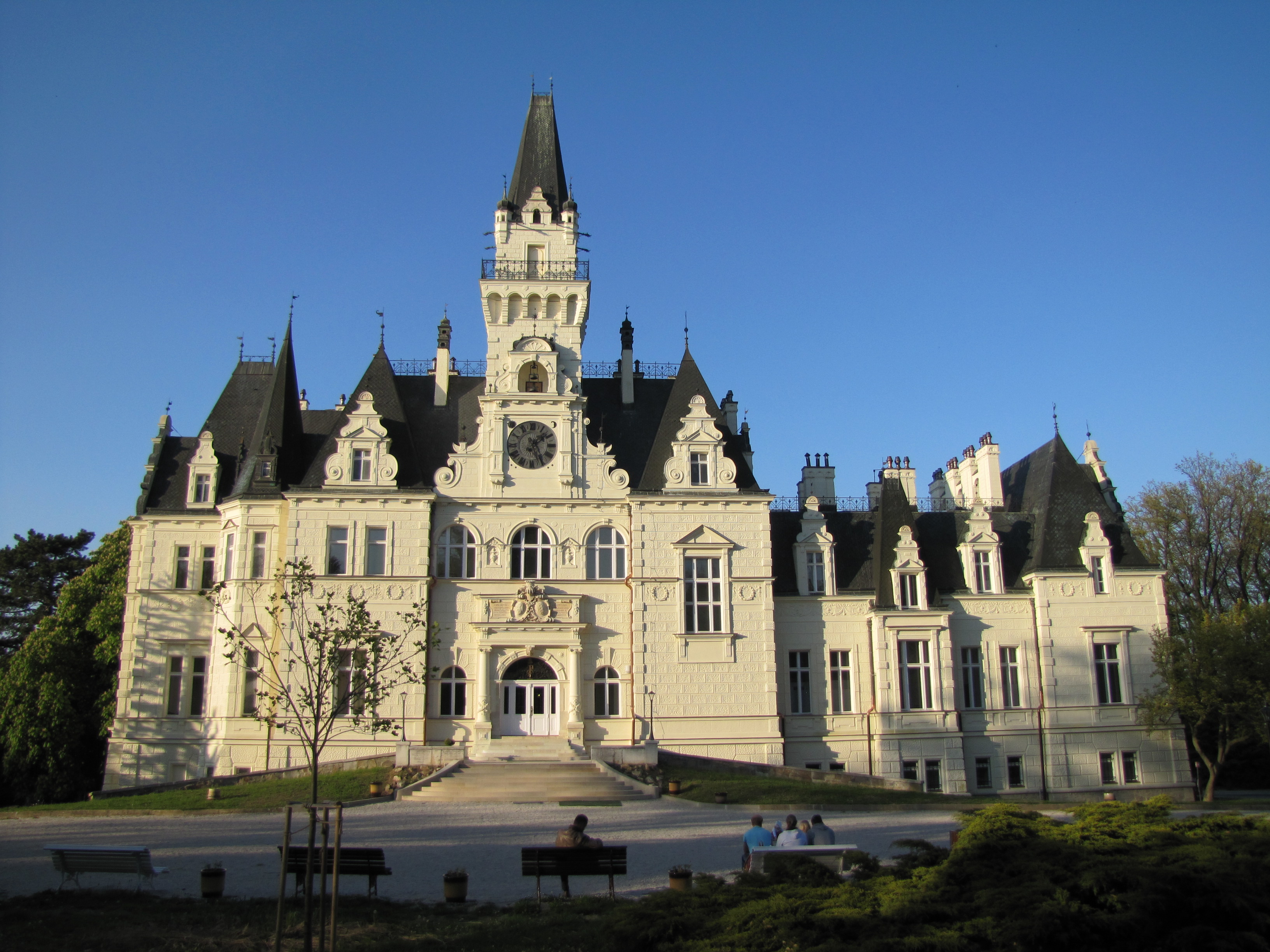
Budmerice Mansion, Slovakia

== See also ==
- Pálffy
