= Pálffy Palace =

Pálffy Palace may refer to various Central European palaces owned by the noble Pálffy ab Erdöd family:

- Palais Pálffy in Vienna, Innere Stadt, Josefsplatz
- Palais Pálffy in Vienna, Innere Stadt, Wallnerstraße Street
- Pálffy Palace in Bratislava, Old Town, Hviezdoslavovo námestie
- Pálffy Palace in Bratislava, Old Town, Ventúrska Street
- Pálffy Palace in Bratislava, Old Town, Panská Street
- Pálffy Palace in Bratislava, Old Town, Podhradie, Zámocká Street
- Pálffy Palace in Bratislava, Old Town, Laurinská Street
- demolished Pálffy Palace in Bratislava, Old Town, Gorkého Street
- Pálffy Palace in Prague, Malá Strana
- Pálffy Palace (Pálffy-kastély) in Budapest, Hungary
