= Pálffy =

Surname

Pálffy or Palffy is a Hungarian surname which means "son of Pál (Paul)". The family name is common in Hungary and Slovakia.

== Pálffy ab Erdöd noble family ==
The most famous bearers of the name Pálffy are the members of the Austro-Hungarian noble family Pálffy ab Erdöd. Family members include:

- Paul Pálffy ab Erdöd (1580/1589–1653), Palatine of Hungary, Knight of the Golden Fleece
- Johann Bernhard Stephan, Graf Pálffy ab Erdöd (1664–1751), Imperial field marshal, Palatine of Hungary, Knight of the Golden Fleece
- Nikolaus VI Graf Pálffy ab Erdöd (1657/67–1732), Imperial field marshal and Palatine of Hungary, Knight of the Golden Fleece
- Lipót Pálffy de Erdőd (1764–1825), Major General
- Ferdinand Palffy von Erdöd (1774–1840), mining engineer in the Austrian Empire and Vienna Theatre manager
- Fidél Pálffy (1895–1946), Hungarian nobleman who was a leading supporter of Nazism in Hungary

== Other people named Pálffy ==
Other notable people with the surname include:

- Žigmund Pálffy (born 1972), Slovak ice hockey player
- David Palffy (born 1969), Canadian actor of Hungarian extraction
- Zsuzsanna Pálffy (born 1970), Hungarian handball player
- Géza Pálffy (born 1971), Hungarian historian

== See also ==
- Pálffy Palace (disambiguation)
