= Krumbach, Lower Austria =

Krumbach
- Municipality
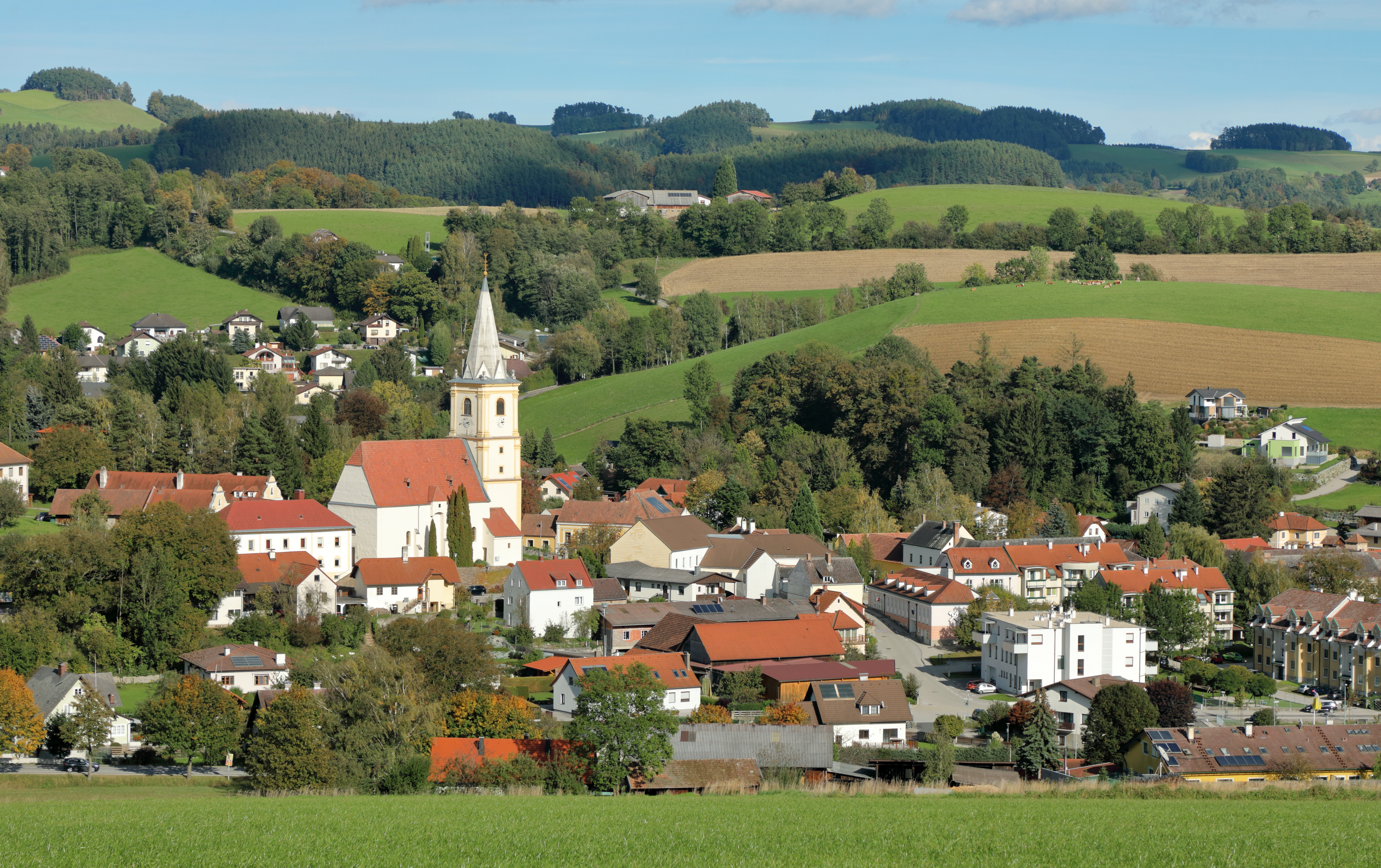
- Southwest view of Krumbach

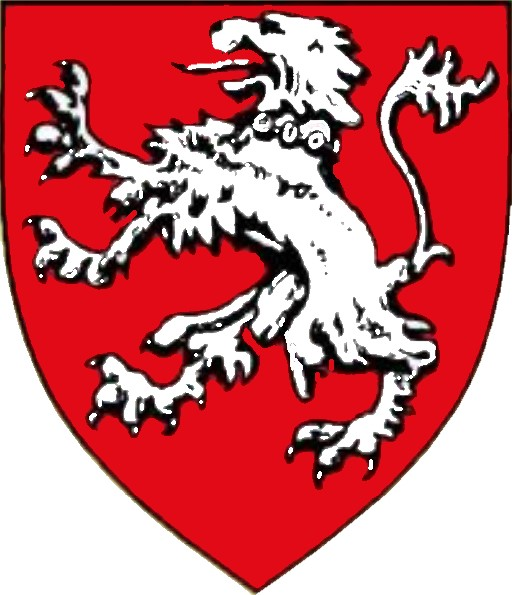
- Coat of arms

- Location within Austria
- Coordinates: 47°31′27″N 16°11′31″E
- Country: Austria
- State: Lower Austria
- District: Wiener Neustadt-Land

Government
  - Mayor: Christian Stacherl (ÖVP)

Area
  - Total: 43.91 km^{2} (16.95 sq mi)
- Elevation: 533 m (1,749 ft)

Population (2018-01-01)
  - Total: 2,316
  - Density: 52.74/km^{2} (136.6/sq mi)
- Time zone: UTC+1 (CET)
  - Summer (DST): UTC+2 (CEST)
- Postal code: 2851
- Area code: 02647
- Vehicle registration: WB
- Website: www.krumbach-noe.at

Krumbach is a market town in southern Lower Austria, Austria. It is part of the landscape Bucklige Welt.

== History ==
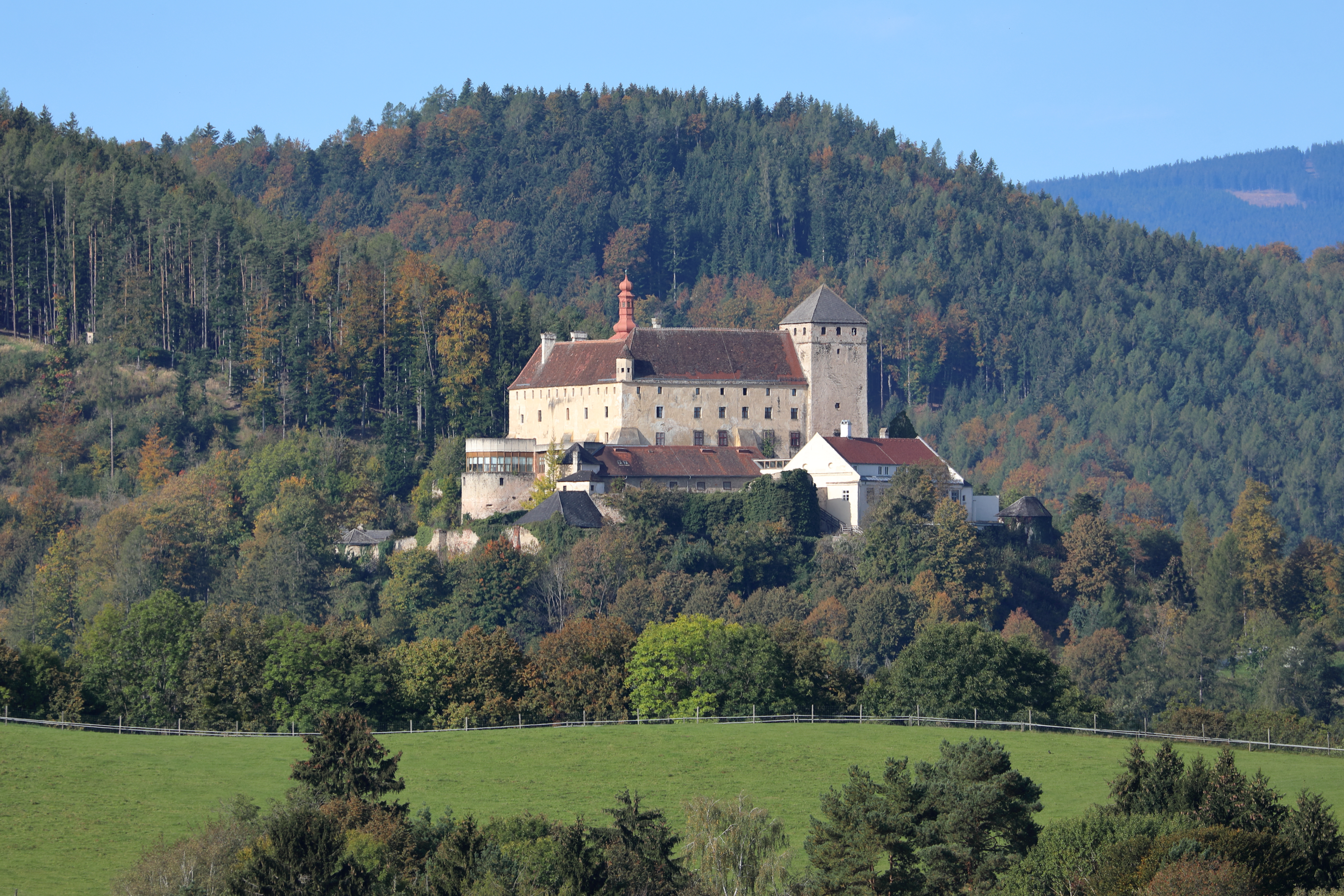
Krumbach Castle

Archaeological artifacts from the Stone Age, the Bronze Age and the Roman times have been found in the area. In 1182, Krumbach was mentioned for the first time in writing. The present castle Schloss Krumbach was erected in the 13th century. In 1394 Hans von Chrumbach, the last Lord of Krumbach, died and left the castle to his maternal uncle.

In the 17th and 18th centuries, the plague and the cholera affected Krumbach. In 1854, it became a market town. In 1884, Krumbach opened a fire station. It has a post office, a school (Volksschule Krumbach), a high school (Hauptschule Krumbach) and a church.

== Mayors since 1945 ==
1945	Anton Schwarz
1945–1946	Johann Gebhart
1946–1950	Ernst Bauer
1950–1963	Florian Freiler
1963–1979	Ernst Blochberger
1979–1990	Friedrich Gamauf
1990–1995	Otmar Gebhart
1995–1997	Friedrich Trimmel
1997-2021	Josef Freiler
2021-	Christian Stacherl

== Coat of arms ==
The coat of arms shows a silver lion with a chain around its neck. The crest is colored red. This has been the town's seal since January 19, 1957.

== Sites of interest ==
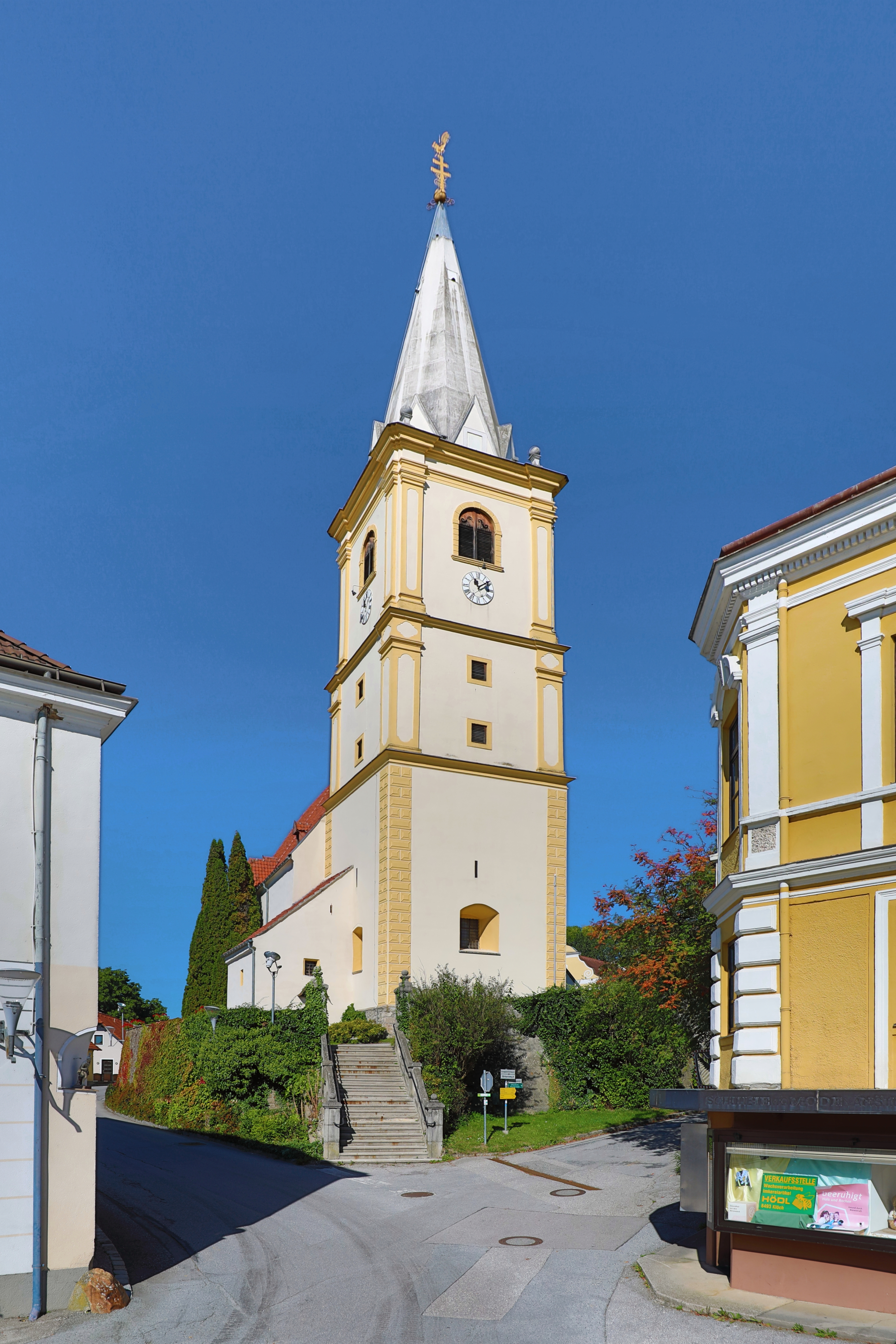
Parish church in Krumbach

Buildings:

- Schloss Krumbach
- Museumsdorf Krumbach

Parks:

- Abrahampark
- Holzerpark
