= Plavecký Castle =

- Plavecké Podhradie, Slovakia
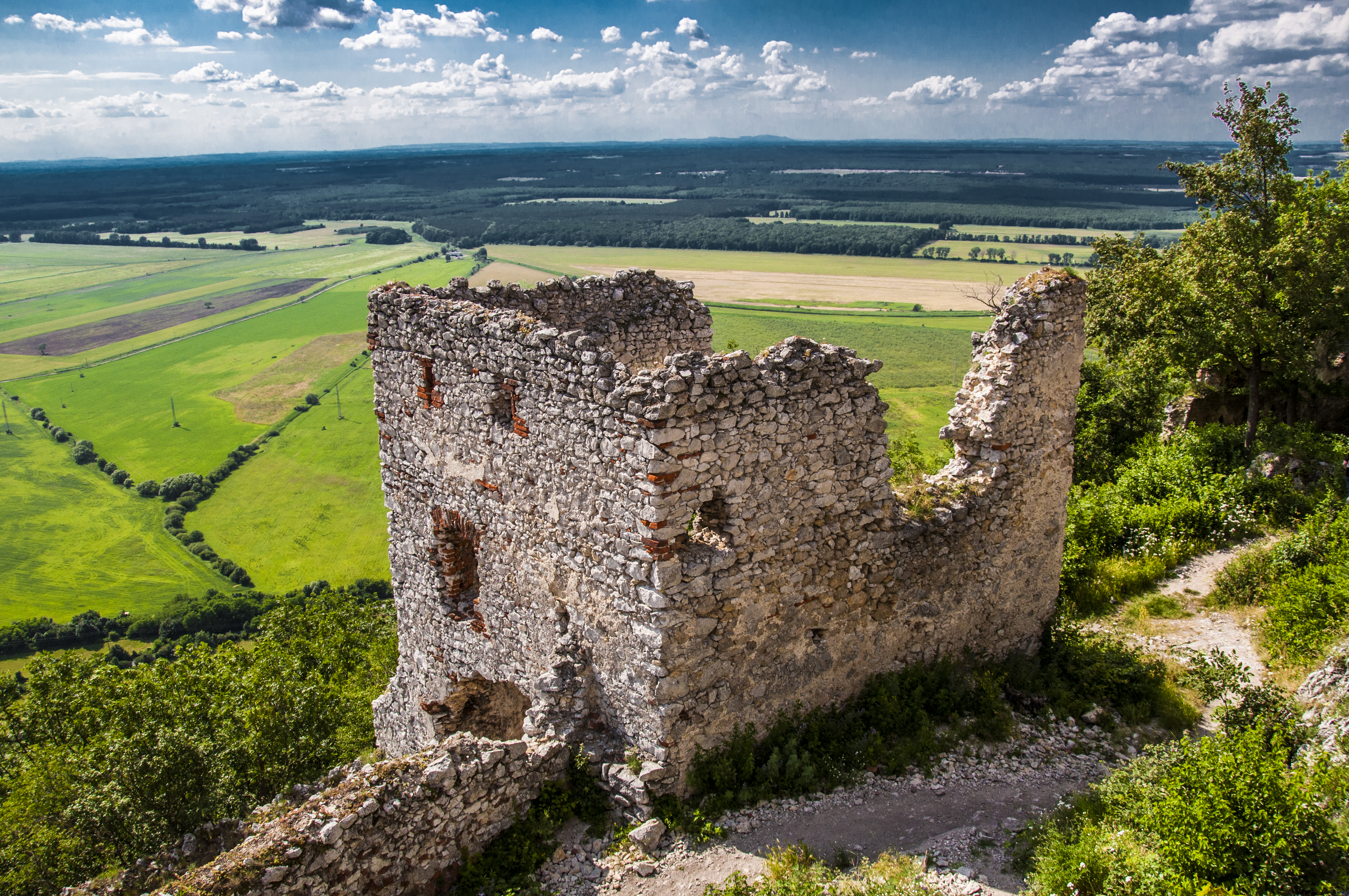
- View on the surroundings from the castle

Site information
- Condition: Ruined

Location
- Location in Slovakia
- Coordinates: 48.493333°N 17.268448°E

Site history
- Built: mid-13th century
- Built by: Béla IV of Hungary
- Materials: Limestone
- Demolished: 1706

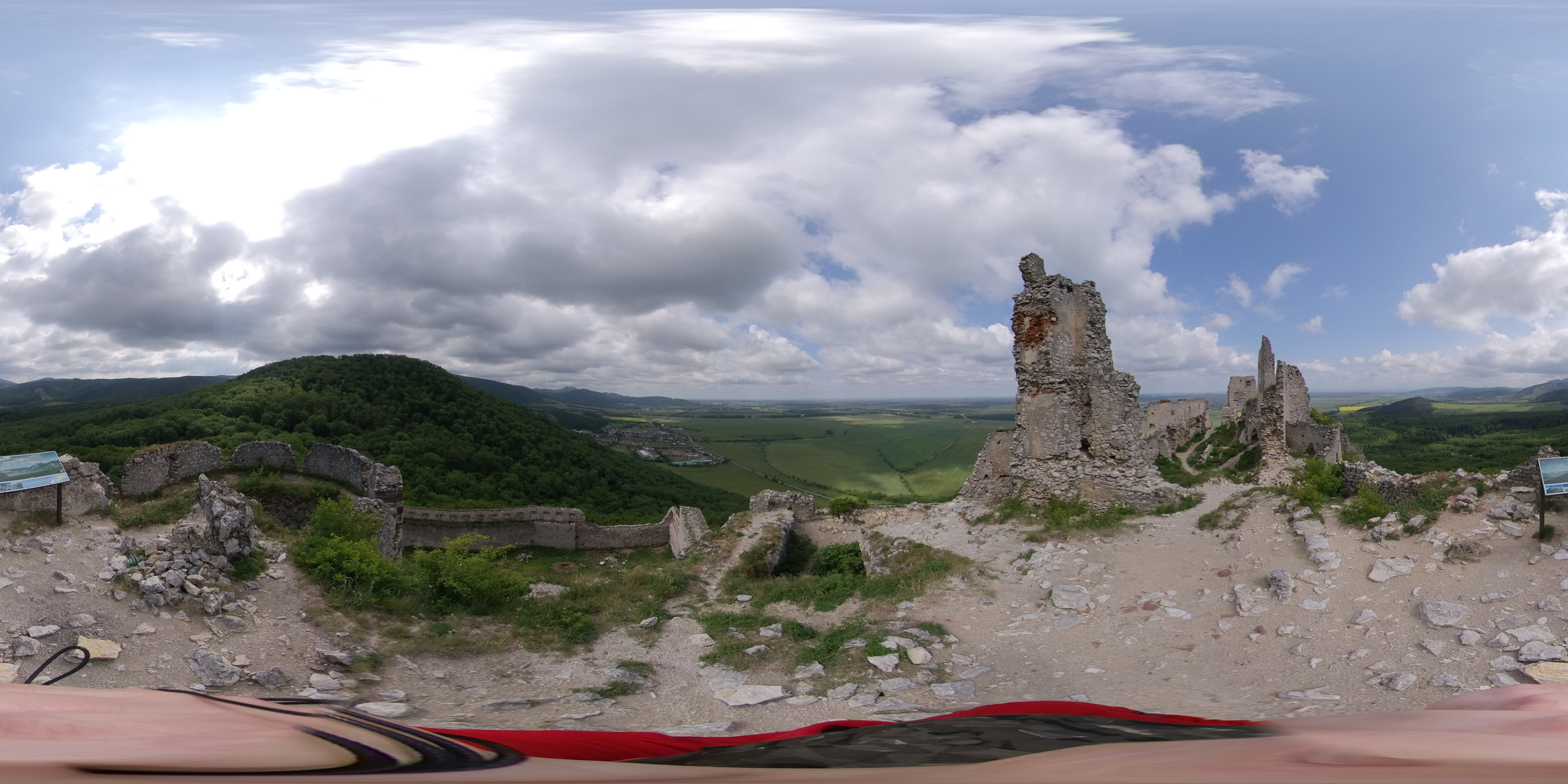
360° panorama (view as a 360° interactive panorama)

Plavecký Castle (Slovak: Plavecký hrad, Hungarian: Detrekő vára) is a ruined medieval castle in the municipality of Plavecké Podhradie in the Bratislava region of south-west Slovakia. It is located on the western foothills of the Little Carpathians.

== History ==
Most likely the building of the castle was an initiative of king Béla IV of Hungary. It was built shortly after the middle of the 13th century as a castle on the frontier of the Kingdom of Hungary. The castle was first mentioned in relation to the Hungarian-Czech wars in documents of Ladislaus IV of Hungary. In 1273, one of the battles against the Czech king Ottokar II of Bohemia took place right below the Plavecký castle. The oligarch, Matthew III Csák seized the castle at the end of the 13th century. A century later, in 1394, Sigismund of Luxembourg donated the castle to his loyal duke Stibor of Stiboricz. When the male line of the Stiboricz family died out, the Plavec estate came into the hands of other landlords. In 1438, these were the count Szentgyörgyi family. They died out in 1543 as well and the Plavecký castle passed on to their relatives, the Salm family. As the Salms had to pay back the pawn money for the castle, an amount they could not afford, they exchanged the castle for a loan with the Fugger family from Červený Kameň (Hungarian: Vöröskő).

In 1560, Anton Fugger, the head of the Fugger family, suddenly died. Subsequently, the family considered moving out their activities of the kingdom of Hungary due to the political situation and the increasing threat of the Ottoman Empire. Melichar Balassa settled the debt of the Fuggers to the Salms and gained control over the Plavec castle estate. His son inherited the property in 1570 for his brave actions during the Ottoman wars.

The Melichar branch of the Balassa family died out in 1621 when the last male member, Peter Balassa, passed away. His widow, Magdaléna Pálffy and her brother Pál Pálffy immediately took over the vacant Plavec castle estate in pledge and obtained it in 1634 as a royal donation. Pál Pálffy then had a renaissance manor built in Plavecké Podhradie (Hungarian: Detrekőváralja), the village under the castle. The manor acquired the residential function while the castle fulfilled the strategic functions during the rebellion of estates.

During the Thököly anti-Habsburg rebellion in 1683, the Plavecký castle was the scene of some fighting. Also at the beginning of the 18th century the castle was involved in some fights. In 1706 the imperial troops conquered the castle from the rebels led by Francis II Rákóczi. After these fights, the Pálffy family was forced to abandon the damaged castle.

== See also ==
- List of castles in Slovakia
