= Neulengbach =

- Municipality
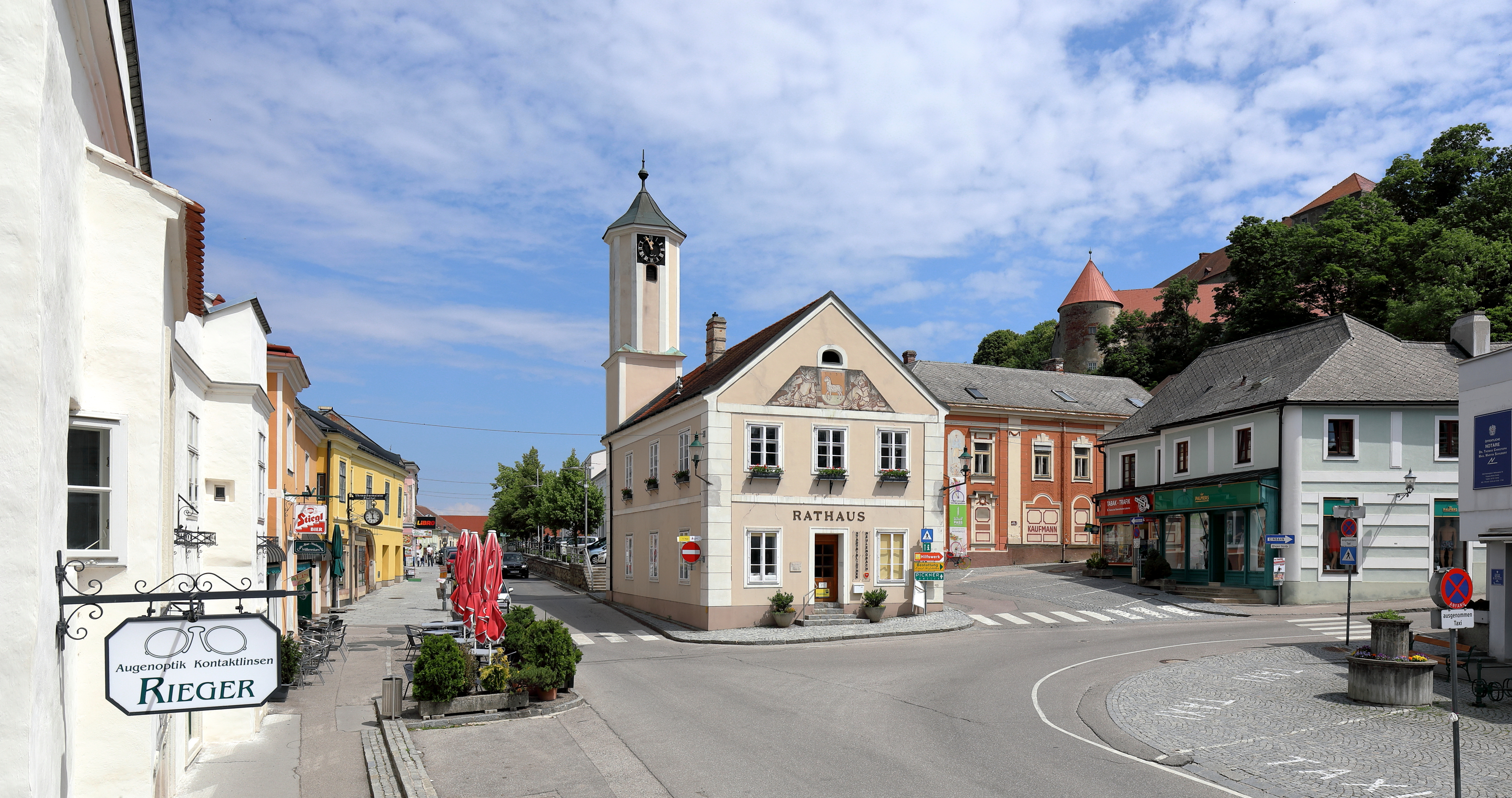
- Neulengbach

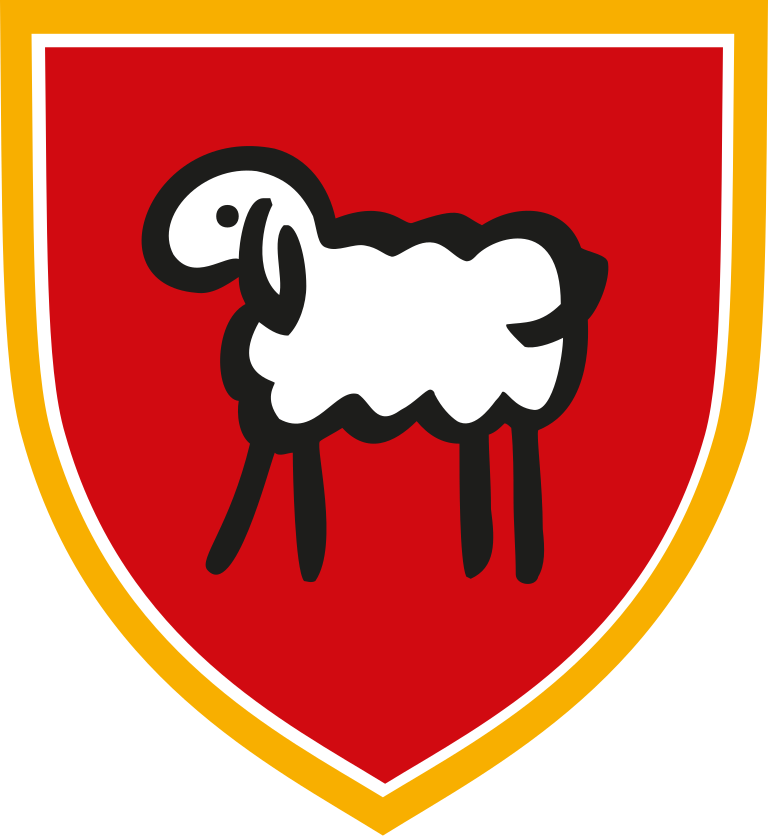
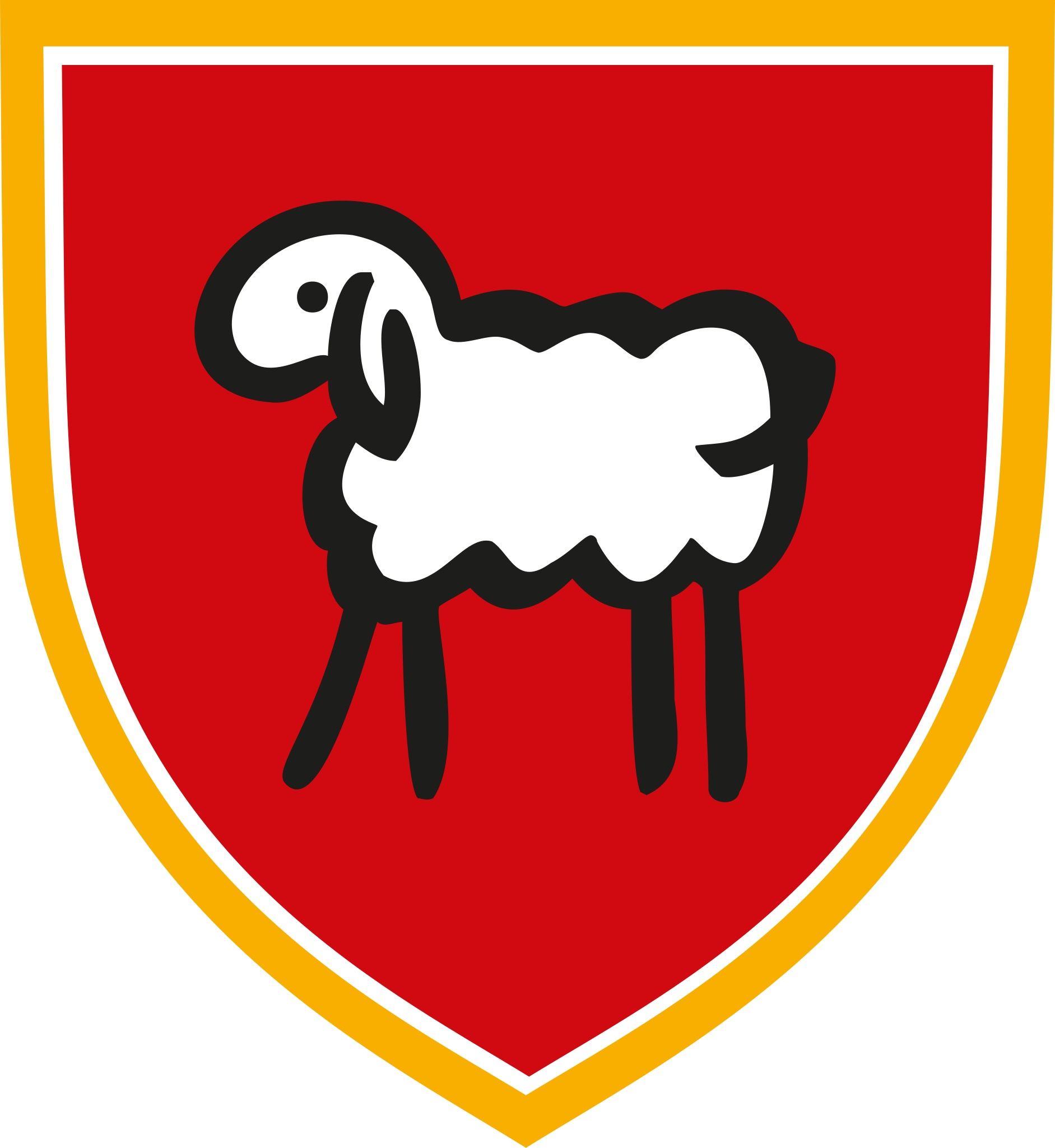
- Coat of arms shield

- Location within Austria
- Coordinates: 48°11′00″N 15°54′00″E
- Country: Austria
- State: Lower Austria
- District: Sankt Pölten-Land

Government
  - Mayor: Franz Wohlmuth (ÖVP)

Area
  - Total: 51.64 km^{2} (19.94 sq mi)
- Elevation: 251 m (823 ft)

Population (2018-01-01)
  - Total: 8,281
  - Density: 160.4/km^{2} (415.3/sq mi)
- Time zone: UTC+1 (CET)
  - Summer (DST): UTC+2 (CEST)
- Postal code: 3040
- Area code: 02772
- Vehicle registration: PL
- Website: www.neulengbach.com

Neulengbach is a municipality in the district of Sankt Pölten-Land in Lower Austria.

== Population ==
Historical population
Year	Pop.	±%
1869	3,985	—
1880	4,460	+11.9%
1890	4,406	−1.2%
1900	4,772	+8.3%
1910	5,556	+16.4%
1923	5,865	+5.6%
1934	5,853	−0.2%
1939	5,981	+2.2%
1951	5,823	−2.6%
1961	5,307	−8.9%
1971	5,585	+5.2%
1981	6,537	+17.0%
1991	6,147	−6.0%
2001	7,120	+15.8%
2011	7,837	+10.1%
2024	8,661	+10.5%

== Historical personalities ==
In 1911, the twenty-one year-old artist Egon Schiele met the seventeen-year-old Walburga (Wally) Neuzil, who lived with him in Vienna and served as a model for some of his most striking paintings. They moved to the town of Český Krumlov (Krumau) in southern Bohemia, the birthplace of Schiele's mother, but were driven out by the disapproval of their lifestyle, which including the alleged employment of the town's teenage girls as his models.

Then they moved to Neulengbach, seeking inspirational surroundings and an inexpensive studio in which to work. As previously, Schiele's studio became a gathering place for Neulengbach's delinquent children. Schiele's way of life aroused much animosity among the town's inhabitants, and in April 1912 he was arrested for seducing a young girl below the age of consent.

When they came to his studio to place him under arrest, the police seized more than a hundred drawings which they considered pornographic. Schiele was imprisoned while awaiting his trial. When his case was brought before a judge, the charges of seduction and abduction were dropped, but the artist was found guilty of exhibiting erotic drawings in a place accessible to children. In court, the judge burned one of the offending drawings over a candle flame. The twenty-one days he had already spent in custody were taken into account, and he was sentenced to a further three days imprisonment. While in prison, Schiele created a series of 12 paintings depicting the difficulties and discomfort of being locked in a jail cell.

== Transport ==
Neulengbach station

Neulengbach is located on the Westbahn, on which REX51 and SS50 pass from Wien Westbahnhof to Sankt Poelten / Neulengbach.

Neulengbach is located in the area of the transpprt association Verkehrsverbund Ost-Region (VOR).

== Gallery ==
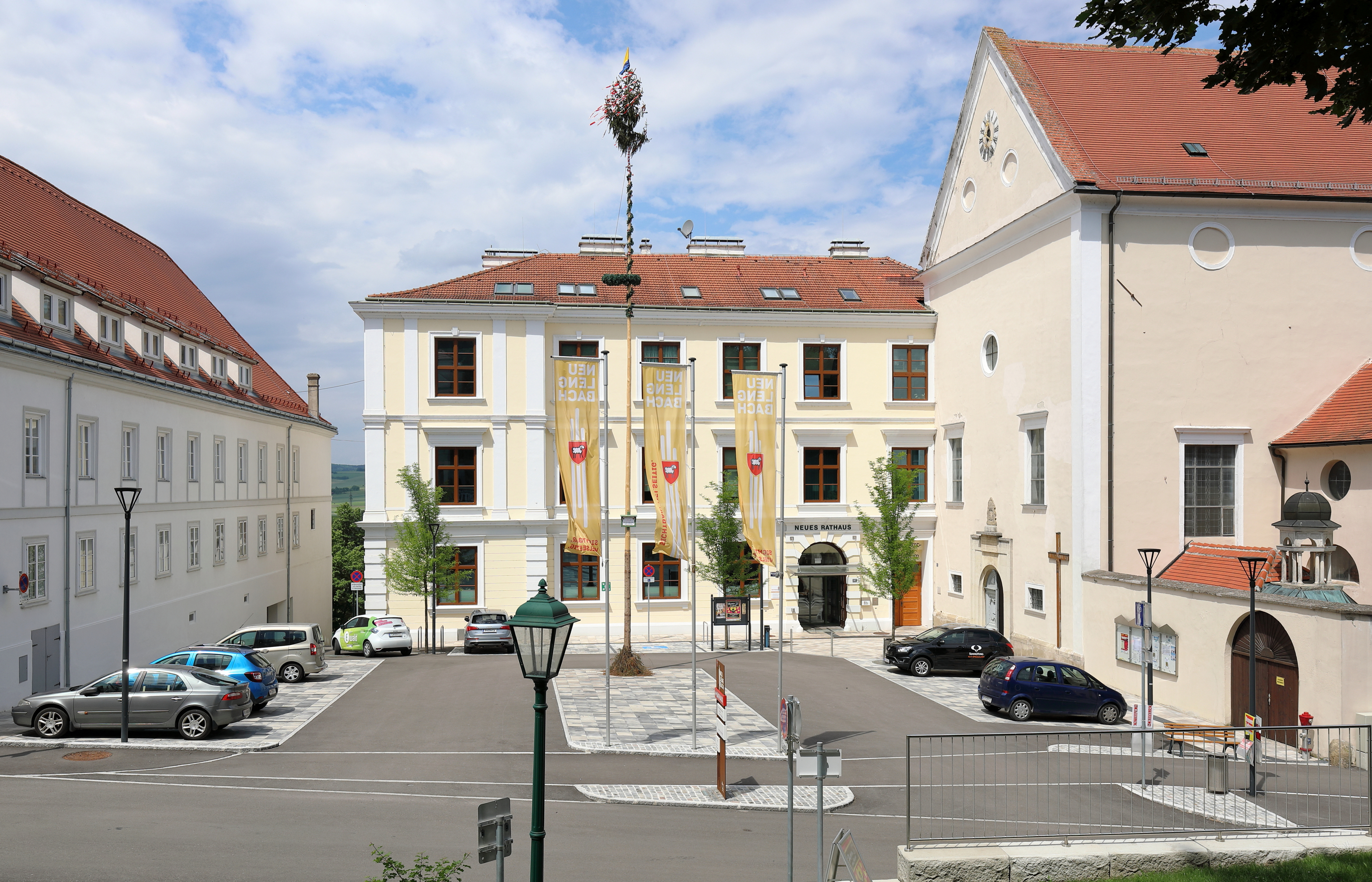
Church square

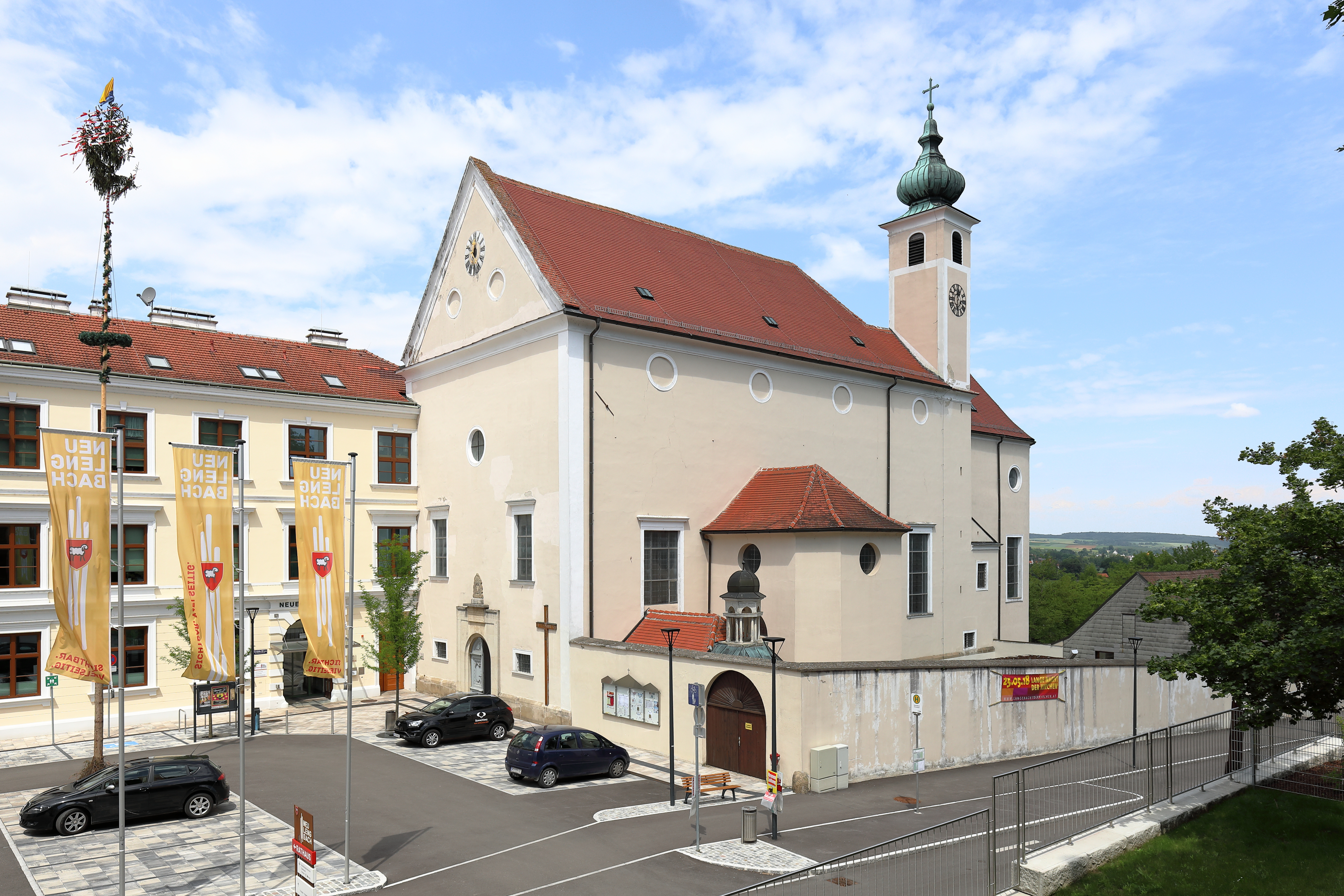
Parish church

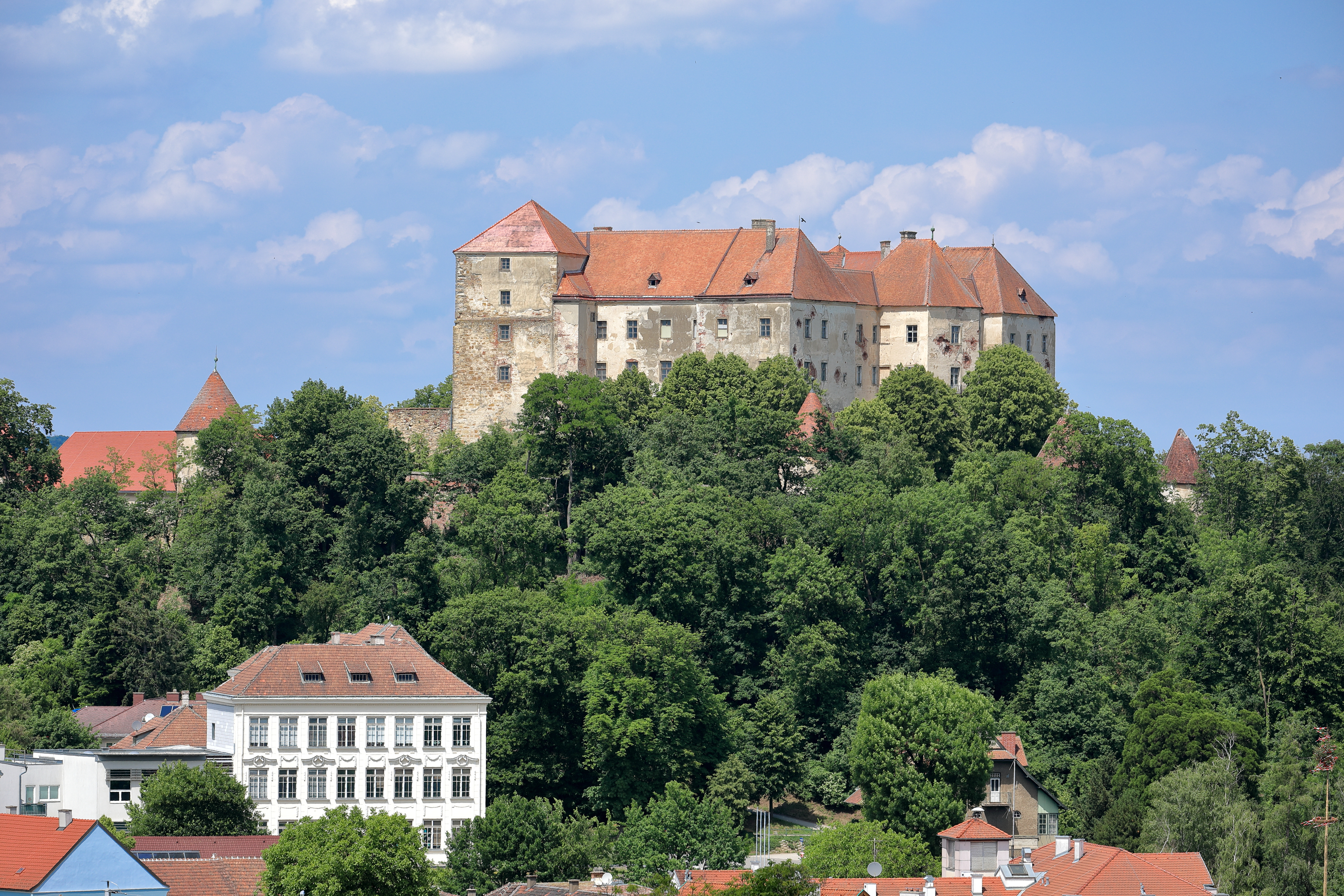
Castle

== See also ==
- Burg Neulengbach
