= Schloss Krumbach =

Coordinates: 47°30′10.657″N 16°11′43.07″E

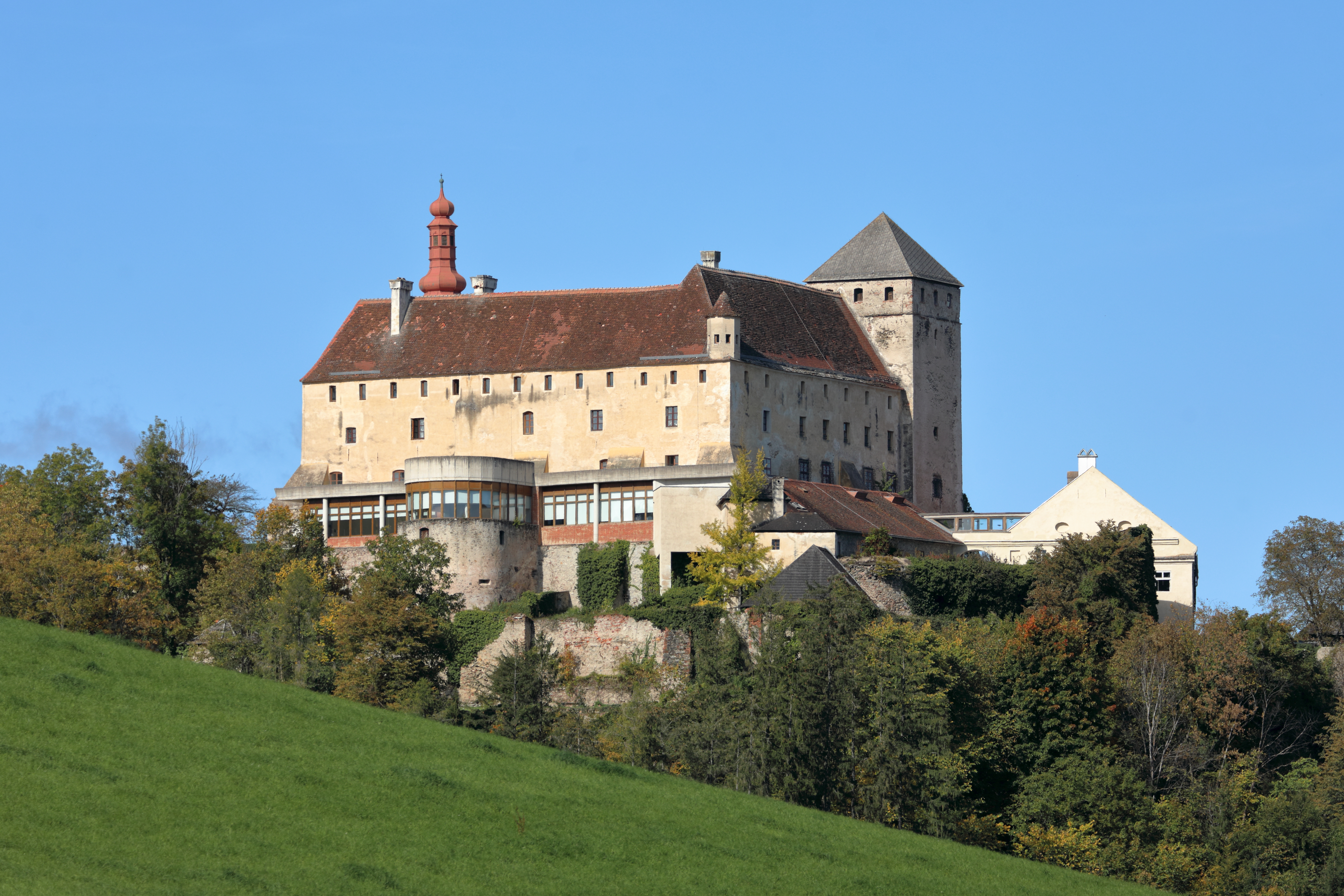
Krumbach Castle, Lower Austria

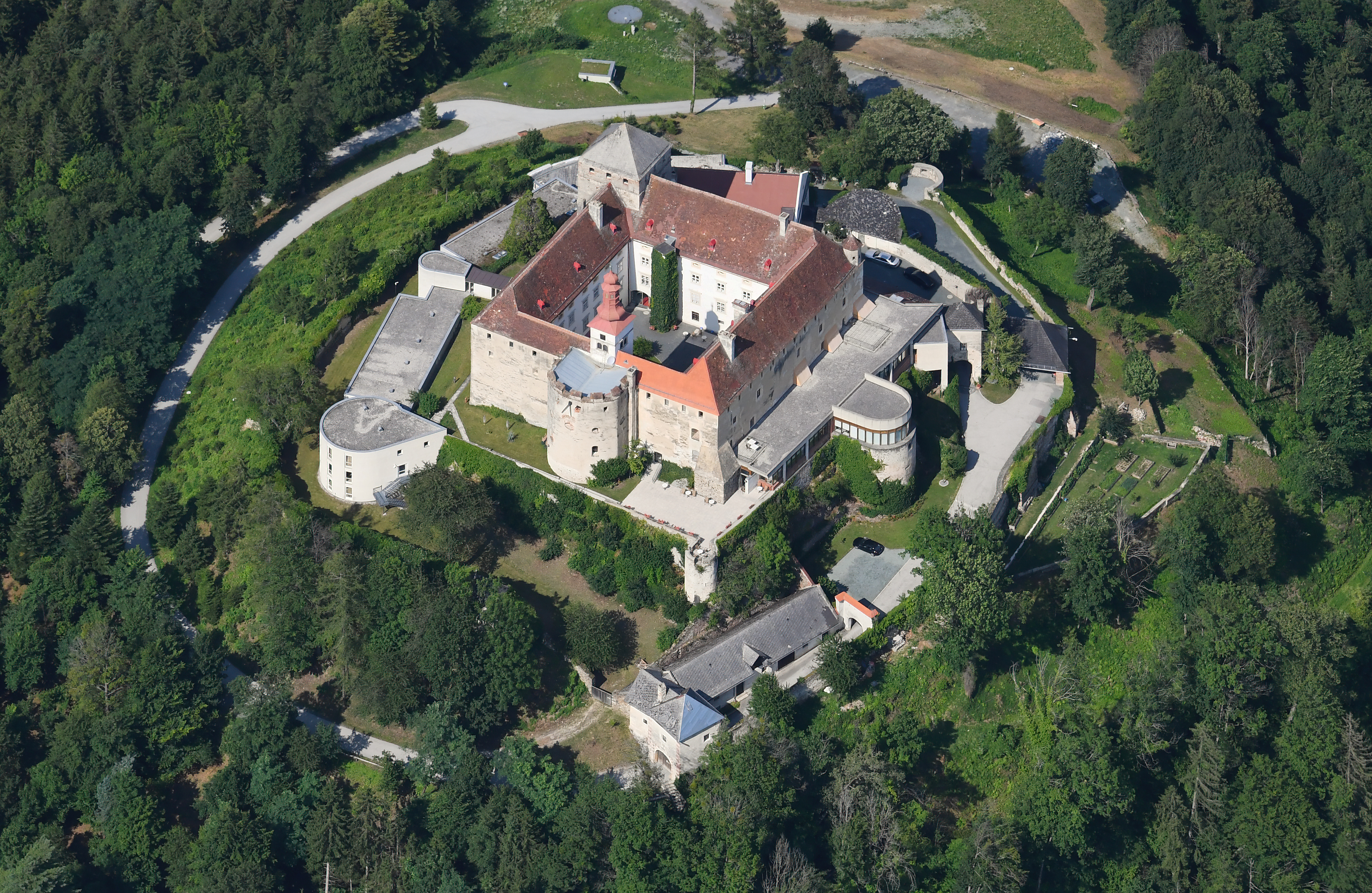
Aerial view from the southwest

Schloss Krumbach is a castle located in the market town of Krumbach in the state of Lower Austria in Austria.

== History ==
The building was constructed as a fortress in the 11th century. In 1192 "Gerhardus de Chrumpach" was mentioned in documents for the first time. The fortress was destroyed by the Magyars in 1260. It was later owned for over 200 years by the family of Pálffy von Erdöd. Sold to an Austrian lawyer in 1875, the castle changed private owners several times. It was converted into a hotel in 1993 and is owned by the Austrian investor Mirko Kovats and his Artis Hotel Group as of 2009. Since 2020, it has operated as Schloss Krumbach International School, a private school with boarding. Since June 2021, Schloss Krumbach has been an authorised IB World School, offering the IB Diploma Programme to students in Grades 11 and 12.
