= Ferenc Mező =

Hungarian poet

Olympic medal record

Art competitions
Gold medal – first place	1928 Amsterdam	Epic works

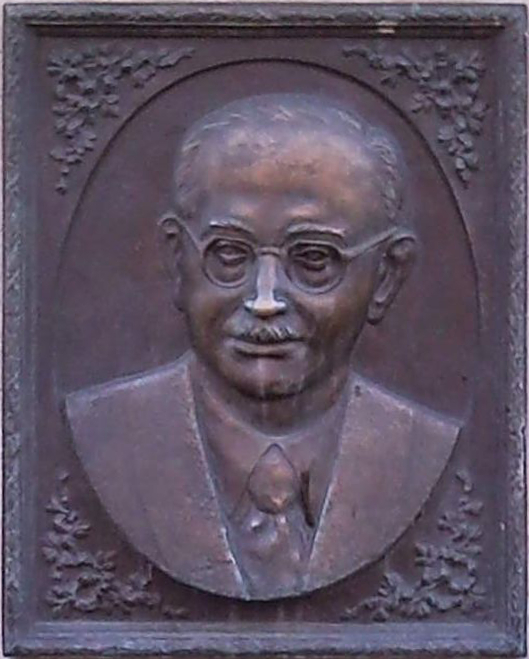
Mező Ferenc

Ferenc Mező, also known as Grünfeld (March 13, 1885 – November 21, 1961), was a Hungarian poet. He was born in Pölöskefő, Zala County, and died in Budapest. In 1928, he won a gold medal in the art competitions of the Olympic Games for his "History of the Olympic Games".
