= Burg Neulengbach =

Castle in Lower Austria

Coordinates: 48°11′53″N 15°54′37″E

- Lower Austria, Austria
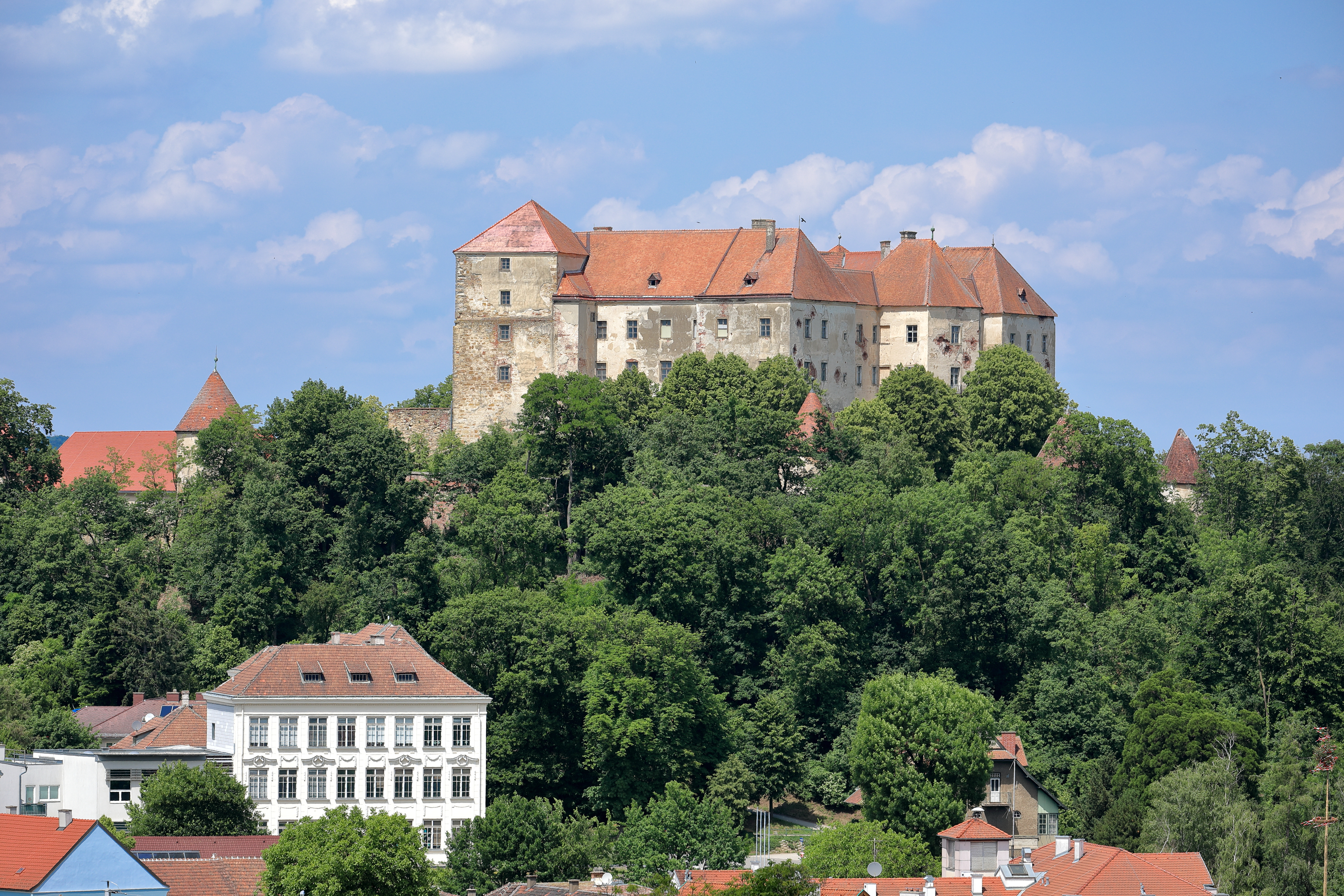

Site information
- Type: Castle

Burg Neulengbach is a castle in Neulengbach in Lower Austria, Austria. Burg Neulengbach is 268 metres (879 ft) above sea level. It was founded around 1189.

== See also ==
- List of castles in Austria
