= Plavecké Podhradie =

Slovakian village

Plavecké Podhradie Detrekőváralja
- Municipality
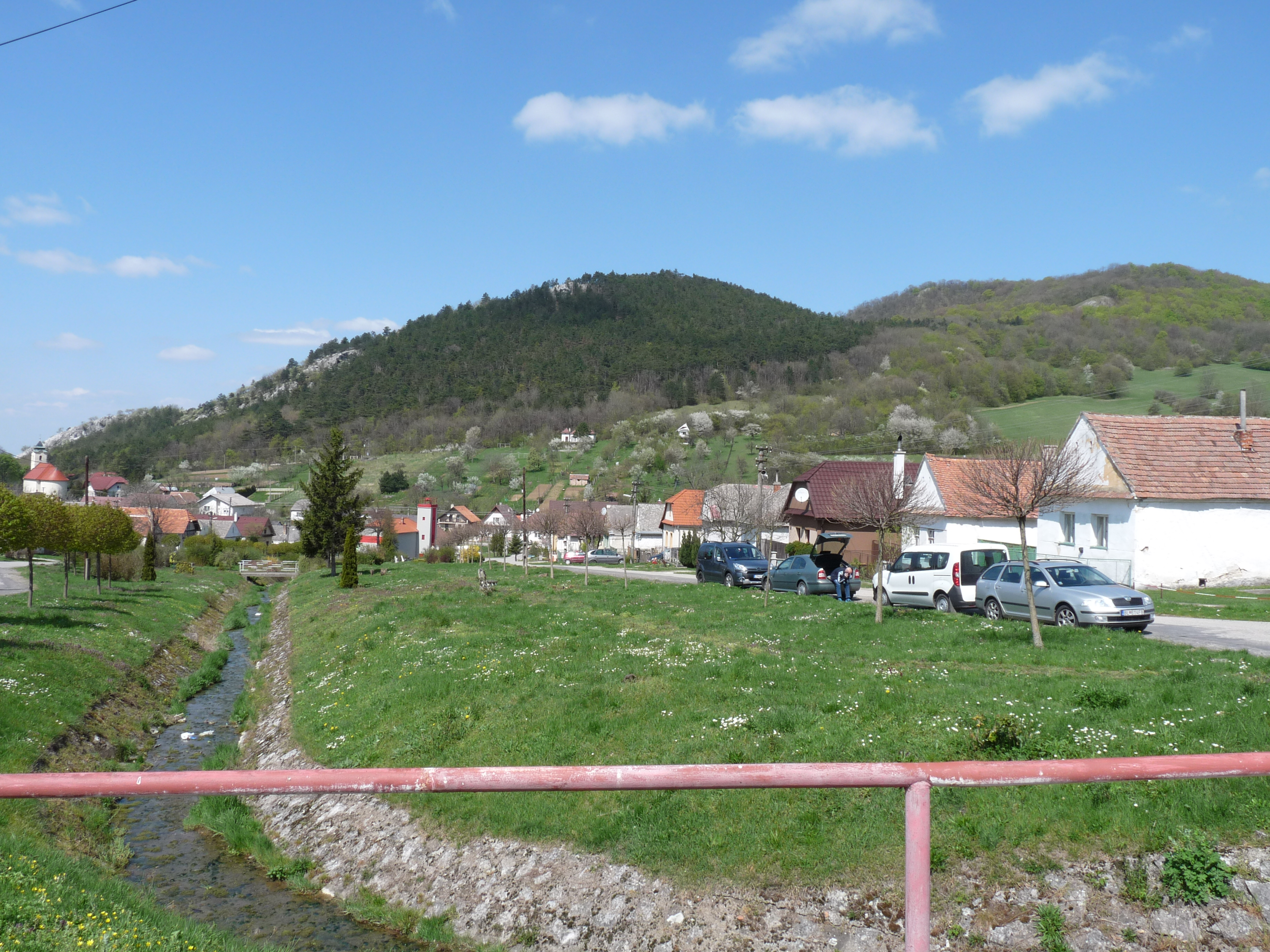

- Flag Coat of arms

- Location of Plavecké Podhradie in the Bratislava Region Location of Plavecké Podhradie in Slovakia
- Coordinates: 48.48°N 17.27°E
- Country: Slovakia
- Region: Bratislava Region
- District: Malacky District
- First mentioned: 1247

Area
  - Total: 21.18 km^{2} (8.18 sq mi)
- Elevation: 218 m (715 ft)

Population (2025)
  - Total: 735
- Time zone: UTC+1 (CET)
  - Summer (DST): UTC+2 (CEST)
- Postal code: 906 36
- Area code: +421 34
- Vehicle registration plate (until 2022): MA
- Website: www.plaveckepodhradie.sk

Plavecké Podhradie (Hungarian: Detrekőváralja) is a village and municipality in western Slovakia in the Malacky District in the Bratislava region.

== History ==
In historical records the village was first mentioned in 1247 AD.

== Geography ==
The municipality lies at an altitude of 218 metres (715 ft) and covers an area of 21.18 km^{2} (8.18 sq mi) (2025).

== Population ==
Population statistic (10 years)
Year	1995	2005	2015	2025
Count	696	695	672	735
Difference		−0.14%	−3.30%	+9.37%

Population statistic
Year	2024	2025
Count	727	735
Difference		+1.10%

It has a population of 735 people (31 December 2025).

=== Ethnicity ===
Census 2021 (1+ %)
Ethnicity	Number	Fraction
Slovak	678	97.13%
Czech	14	2%
Not found out	10	1.43%
Other	7	1%
Total	698	

In year 2021 was 698 people by ethnicity 678 as Slovak, 14 as Czech, 10 as Not found out, 7 as Other, 4 as Rusyn, 2 as Hungarian and 1 as Austrian.

Note on population: The difference values of population numbers in the table "Population statistic" and in the sections "Ethnicity" & "Religion" is caused by the use of various statistical methods.

=== Religion ===
Census 2021 (1+ %)
Religion	Number	Fraction
Roman Catholic Church	493	70.63%
None	170	24.36%
Not found out	9	1.29%
Total	698	

In year 2021 was 698 people by religion 493 from Roman Catholic Church, 170 from None, 9 from Not found out, 6 from Ad hoc movements, 5 from Evangelical Church, 4 from Greek Catholic Church, 3 from Calvinist Church, 3 from New Apostolic Church, 3 from Buddhism, 1 from Jewish community and 1 from Other.

== Infrastructure ==
Plavecké Podhradie lies on the street from Lozorno and Jablonica. It can be reached by train from Zohor, seasonally also by trains starting in Záhorská Ves on the border to Austria.

== Sights ==
Plavecký Castle and few caves in the Little Carpathians are located near the village. There is also an old Celtic oppidum, renaissance chateau of Pálffy family, and ruins of a medieval monastery.

== Plavecky castle (remains) ==
The original castle was built in the 13th century. The middle part consisted of a Gothic castle with rectangular tower and the palace. In the 16th century it was expensively rebuilt into renaissance fortress with low courtyards. It was continually fortified and maintained during the 17th century, when new cannon bastions were built. In 1706 it was damaged by the army and so became dilapidated in the 18th century. The remains are visible from surrounding environment, part of Zahorie district can be seen from the remains. Water font is located near the remains.

== Gallery ==
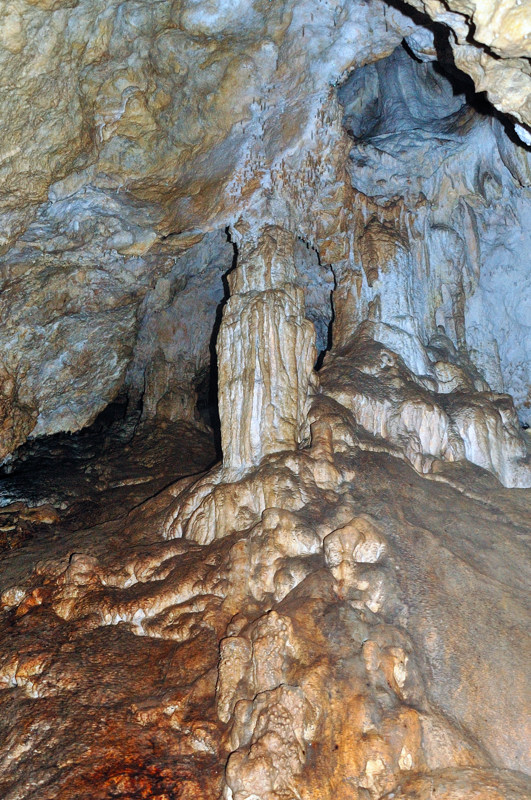
Cave PP1

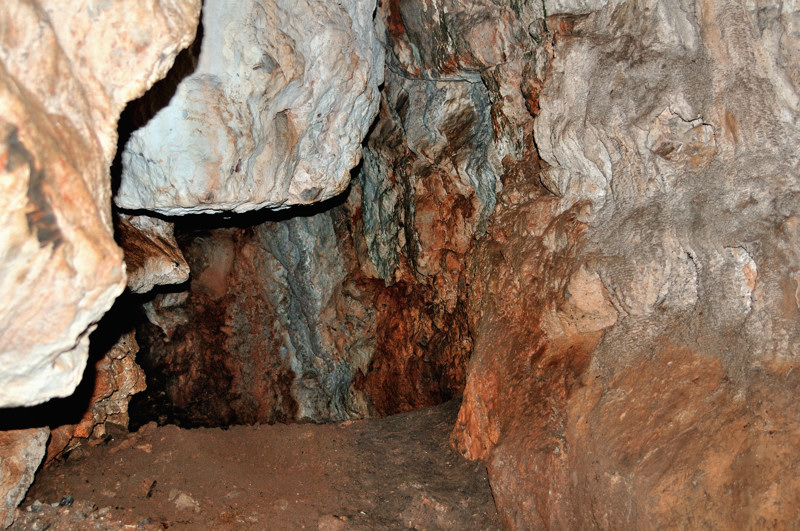
Cave Pri Kríži

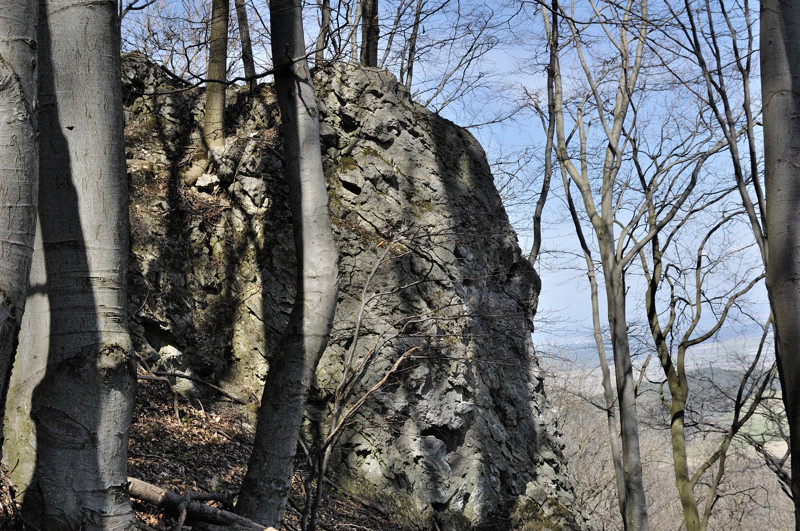
Celtic site Pohanská

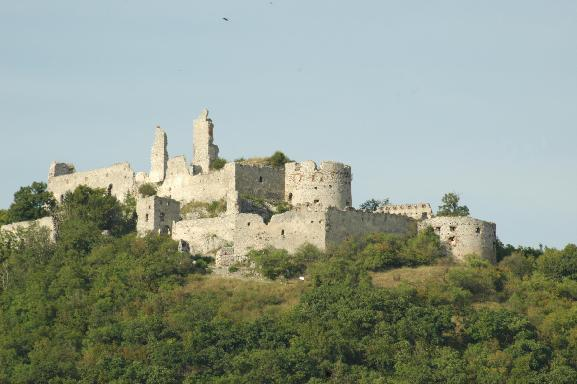
Plavecky castle

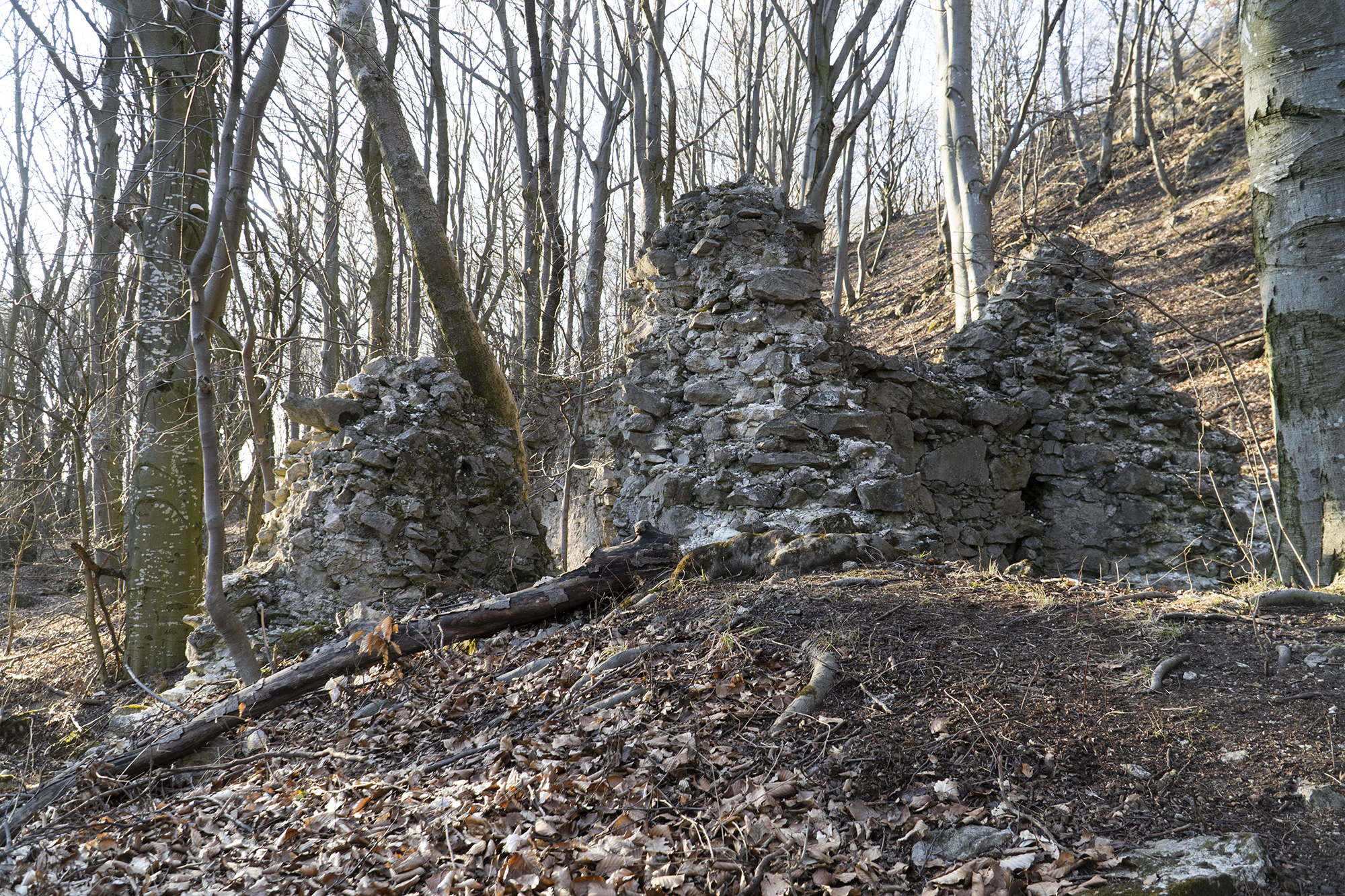
Ruins of monastery church
