= Pálffy Palace (Ventúrska Street) =

Palace in the Old Town of Bratislava

- Pálfiho palác
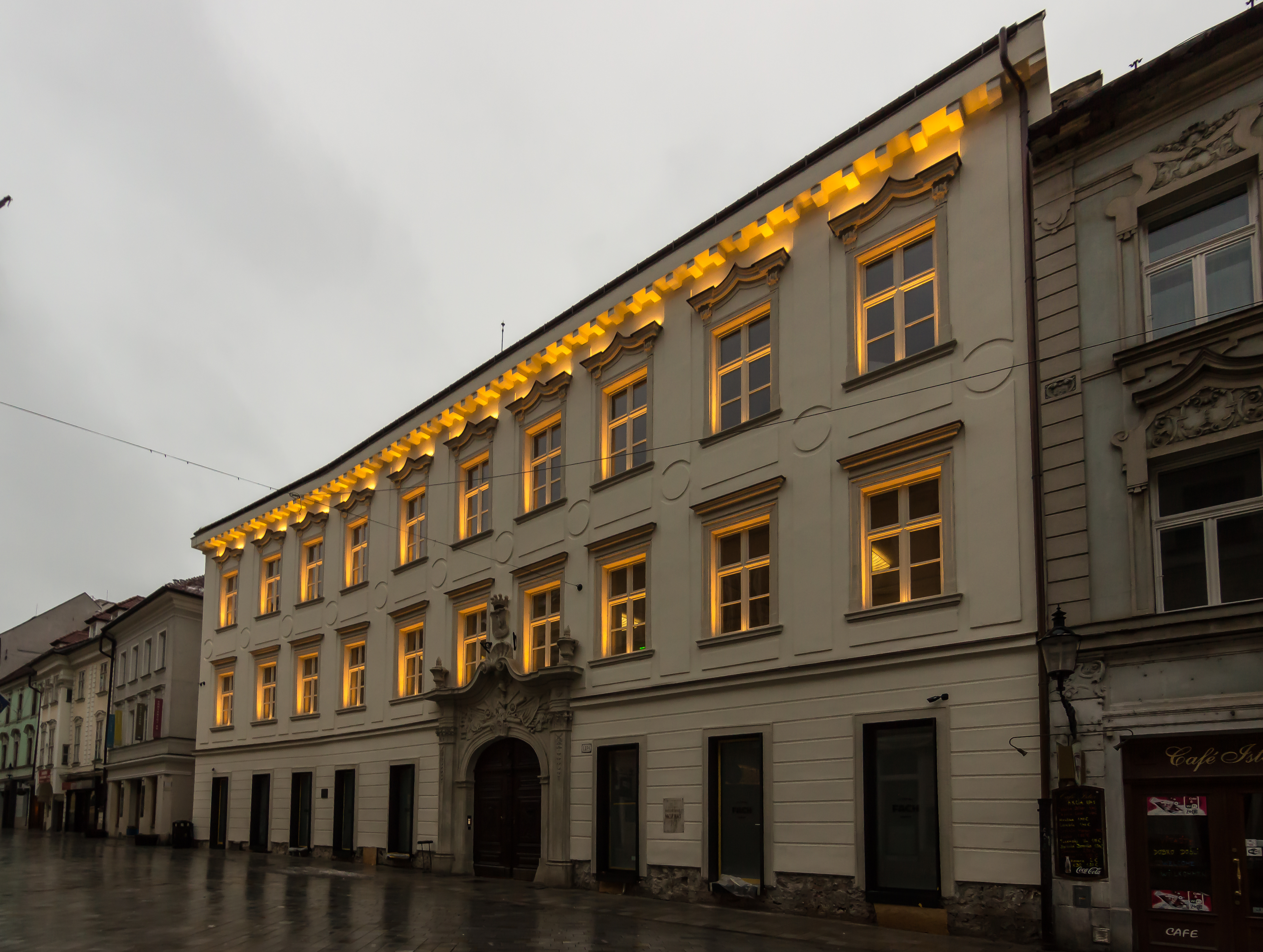

General information
- Type: Palace
- Location: Old Town, Bratislava, Slovakia
- Coordinates: 48.142748°N 17.10659°E

Pálffy Palace (Slovak: Pálfiho palác, Hungarian: Pálffy-palota) is a Baroque-style palace in the Old Town of Bratislava, on Ventúrska street. It was built by Count Leopold Pálffy in 1747. It has an interesting portal with a relief reflecting the military career of the count as a general in the army of Empress Maria Theresa.

During the reconstruction of the palace, parts of a Gothic building were found in walls at the interior of the building. Roman and Celtic finds were uncovered through archaeological research in the basement.

The palace used to contain a mint in the past.

Some believe that in 1762, the six-year-old Wolfgang Amadeus Mozart played a concert at the Palace, though there is dispute amongst historians on this point.

From 1993 to 2012, the palace was used as the Austrian embassy.
