= Pölöskefő =

- Village
- Flag Coat of arms

- Location of Pölöskefő
- Coordinates: 46.602369°N 16.946369°E
- Country: Hungary
- Region: Western Transdanubia
- County: Zala
- District: Nagykanizsa

Area
  - Total: 12.32 km^{2} (4.76 sq mi)

Population (1 January 2025)
  - Total: 365
  - Density: 29.6/km^{2} (76.7/sq mi)
- Time zone: UTC+1 (CET)
  - Summer (DST): UTC+2 (CEST)
- Postal code: 8773
- Area code: (+36) 93
- Website: poloskefo.hu

Pölöskefő (German: Grünfeld) is a village in Zala County, Hungary.

== Notable residents ==
- Ferenc Mező, poet & Olympic gold medalist
