= Pálffy Palace (Zámocká Street) =

Palace in Bratislava, Slovakia

Coordinates: 48°08′42″N 17°06′03″E

- Pálfiho palác (Zámocká)
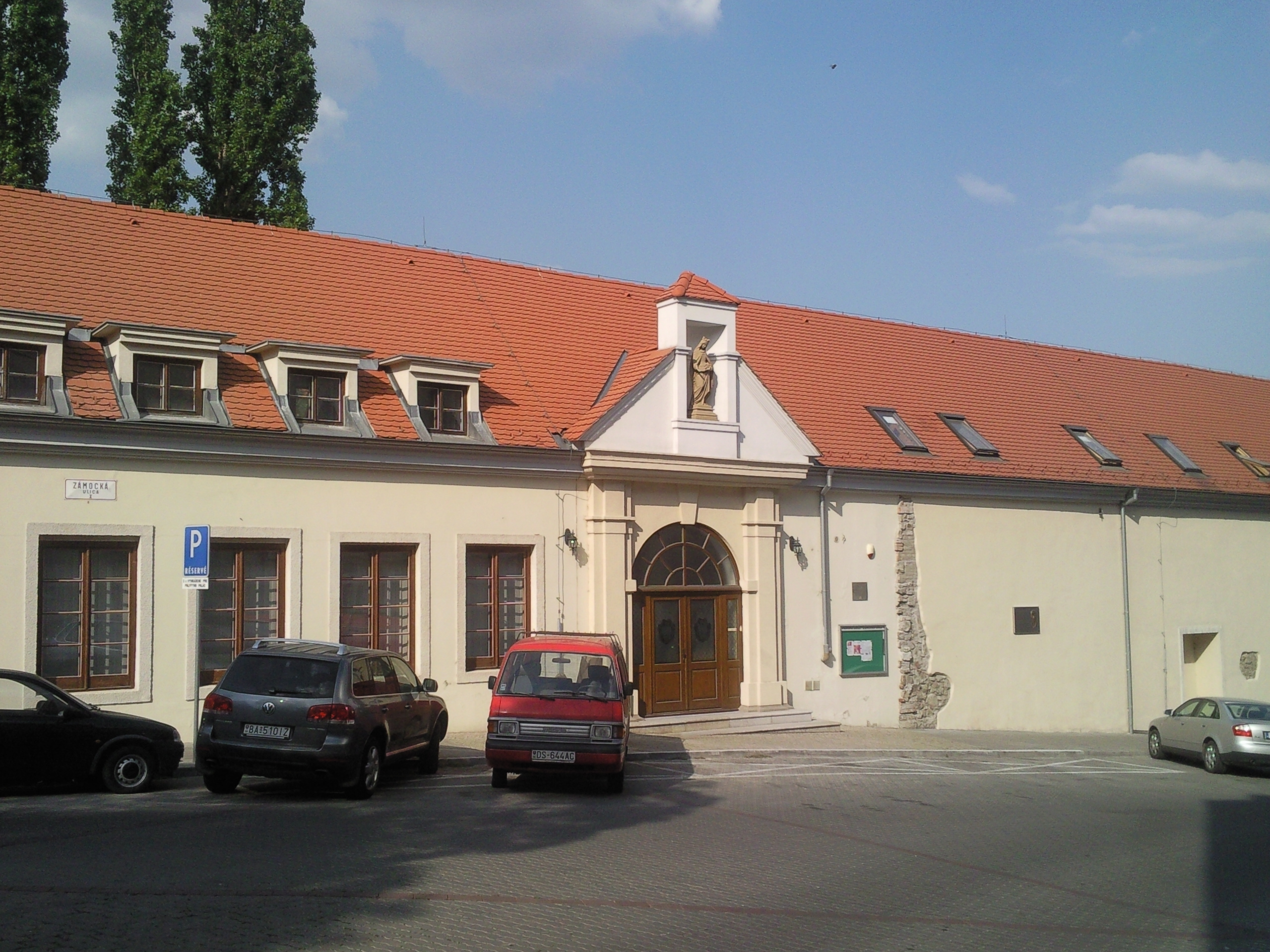
- Central part of the Pálffy Palace facade
- Interactive map of the Pálffy Palace (Zámocká Street) area
- Former names: Pálffy Palace and Garden

General information
- Type: Palace
- Location: Bratislava, Slovakia, Zámocká Street No. 47
- Construction started: 1630s
- Completed: 1646
- Demolished: partially demolished after 1900
- Owner: in private ownership

Pálffy Palace (Slovak: Záhradné krídlo bývalého Pálffyho paláca) is a 17th-century palace of the Pálffy family on Zámocká Street in the Old Town of Bratislava, Slovakia, situated underneath the Bratislava Castle. After partial demolition at the beginning of the 20th century, only the summer pavilion of the original palace complex remains and today, the building is a protected cultural monument and is used for cultural events. Wolfgang Amadeus Mozart performed a concert in the palace during his visit of Bratislava.

It is one of four historical buildings in Bratislava named Palffy Palace, the others being on Panská Street, Ventúrska Street and Hviezdoslav Square.

== History ==
Pálffy Palace and Garden was a large complex built during the reconstruction of the Bratislava castle some time after 1635 by Pál Pálffy. He belonged to the family of Count Mikuláš Pálffy, who married into the Augsburg banking family of Fuggers and acquired financial support to arm soldiers and develop Červený Kameň Castle. Miklós Pálffy was also a captain of Bratislava Castle and a governor of Bratislava province. In 1630, Pállfy was commissioned by the Diet of Hungary to lead a large-scale reconstruction of the Bratislava Castle and during this time he decided to build a palace for himself on Schlossgrund, outside of the walled town of Bratislava (known as Pressburg or Pozsony through much of its history).

The palace was a massive building with castle-like walls that looked plain from the outside but was lavish and luxurious inside. In the Middle Ages, the only access from the city to the castle were the narrow stairs of Zámocké schody Street. Pálffy also built a service road, used during the construction and later for supplying the palace which later became today's Zámocká Street. Soon afterwards, the street was settled by Jews migrating into the city from the areas under former control of Miklós Pálffy. In 1653, Pál Pálffy died inside his palace. In 1732, the palace underwent a major reconstruction. In 1736, Francis Stephen of Lorraine, the future Holy Roman Emperor, resided in Pállfy palace. In 1781, a commission of representatives of four different confessions took place in the palace as a consequence of the Patent of Toleration by Joseph II, Holy Roman Emperor.

In 1870, on behalf of the city of Bratislava, Henrich Justi bought the palace from its owner Samuel Spitzer Loebl for the sum of 105,000 gold pieces and donated it to the city of Bratislava. Artillery barracks were established there together with an orphanage and some flats for the poor. Writing in 1905, historian Tivadar Ortvay notes that the city has negligible income from the barracks, the palace can be sold as construction material and the land turned into new land lots for sale and streets could be connected by eliminating the Pálffy Garden and there is talk about Mitterhauser's plan to keep part of the palace complex and demolish the rest. By this time, the former palace was already substiantally modified for barracks, stables and warehouses, destroying much of its former glory. The palace contained a chapel, that was eventually turned into stables.

After 1900 the complex was slowly and gradually demolished to make room for new buildings, among others the student dormitory Svoradov and elementary school at Palisády Street.

The only part of the former palace complex that survived the gradual demolition was the former summer pavillon which after World War II became the ownership of the Bratislava Residential Company (Bytový podnik Bratislava 1) and a warehouse of construction materials was established here. The condition of the building worsened over time and in 1975, there was a plan to reconstruct the building into a wine house featuring an exposition on winemaking. In 1985, the palace was declared a Slovak Cultural Monument. In 1989 a new architecture competition was conducted with the intent of reconstructing the building for use by the Slovak Union of Visual Arts, as an exposition hall for the Bratislava Castle, as a general purpose exhibition hall and as a confectionery. In March, 1990 the building (but not the land) was sold by the Bratislava Residential Company to ZO Zväzarm - Veterán Car Club Rusovce.

The building was later restored and today it is known as the Pálffy Palace at Zámocká Street. The current palace compound features also stairs from Svoradova Street with a historical portal that was moved here in the 1920s or 1930s in the process of demolition. In 2013, both portal and the stairs were reconstructed by the city borough of Old Town for the sum of 40,000 EUR.

== Pálffy Garden ==
The Pálffy Garden (Slovak: Pálffyho záhrada, German: Pálffygarten, Hungarian: Pálffykert) was a Renaissance garden that was located next to the palace between today's Zámocká Street, Škarniclova Street, Palisády Street, Zochova Street and Pilárikova Street. It was described as the most unique and beautiful garden of both Bratislava and the whole Kingdom of Hungary. The garden featured the Pálffy Hall, which served as a riding hall, housed public happenings, cultural events, and briefly also theatrical productions. The Hall was demolished in 1893.

The garden was opened to the public in 1801 and destroyed with the palace after 1900.

== Today ==
Today, the building serves as a cultural establishment with concerts of classical music taking place here, as well as design cultural events, exhibitions and international conferences.

The restored palace is best accessed from the "Zochova" and "Kapucinska" public transport stops walking up the hill towards Bratislava Castle or from Palisády Street, walking downhill. The building is located approximately 5 minutes walking from the historical city center.

== Gallery ==
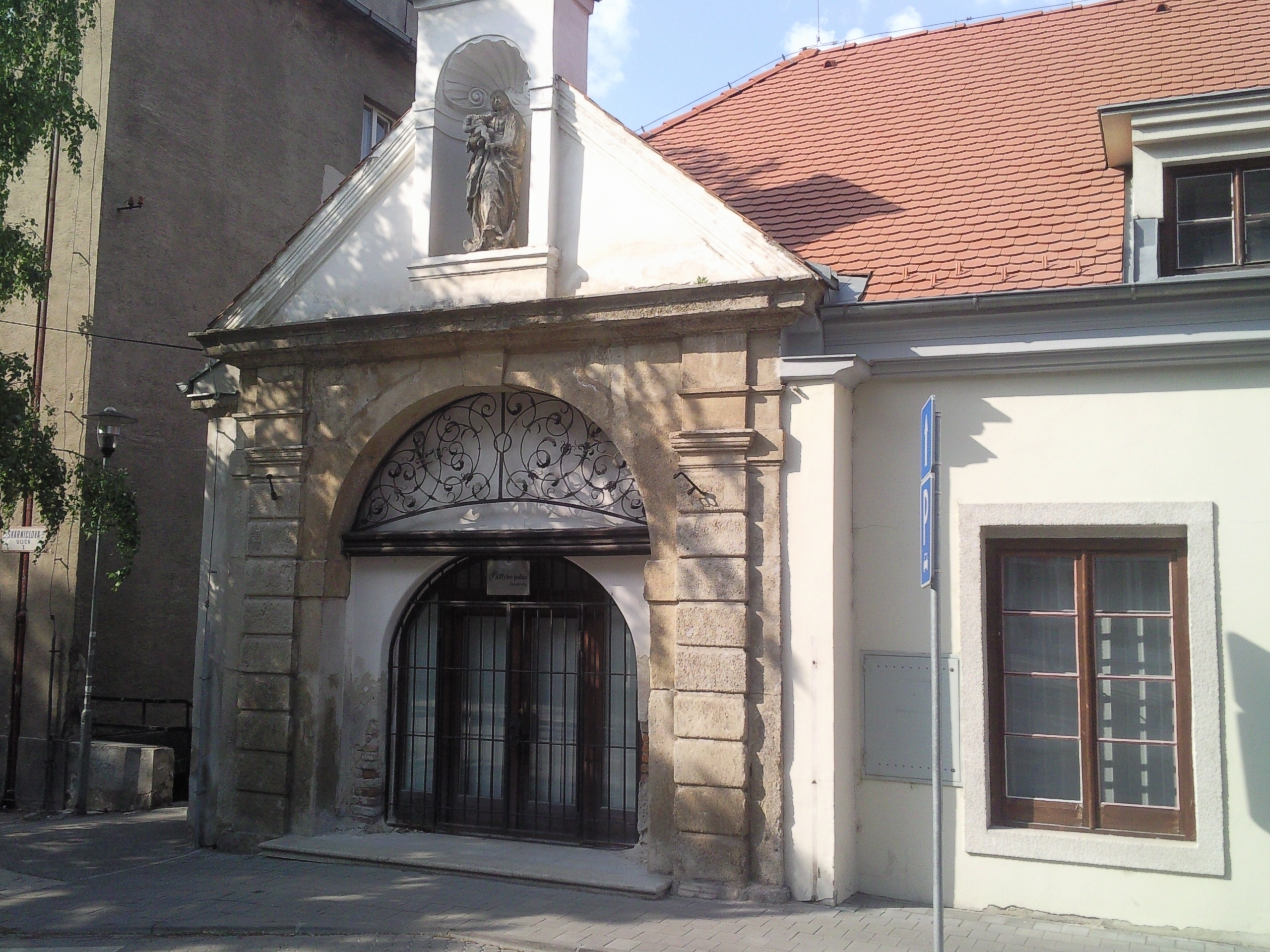
Pálffy Palace as seen from Zámocká Street

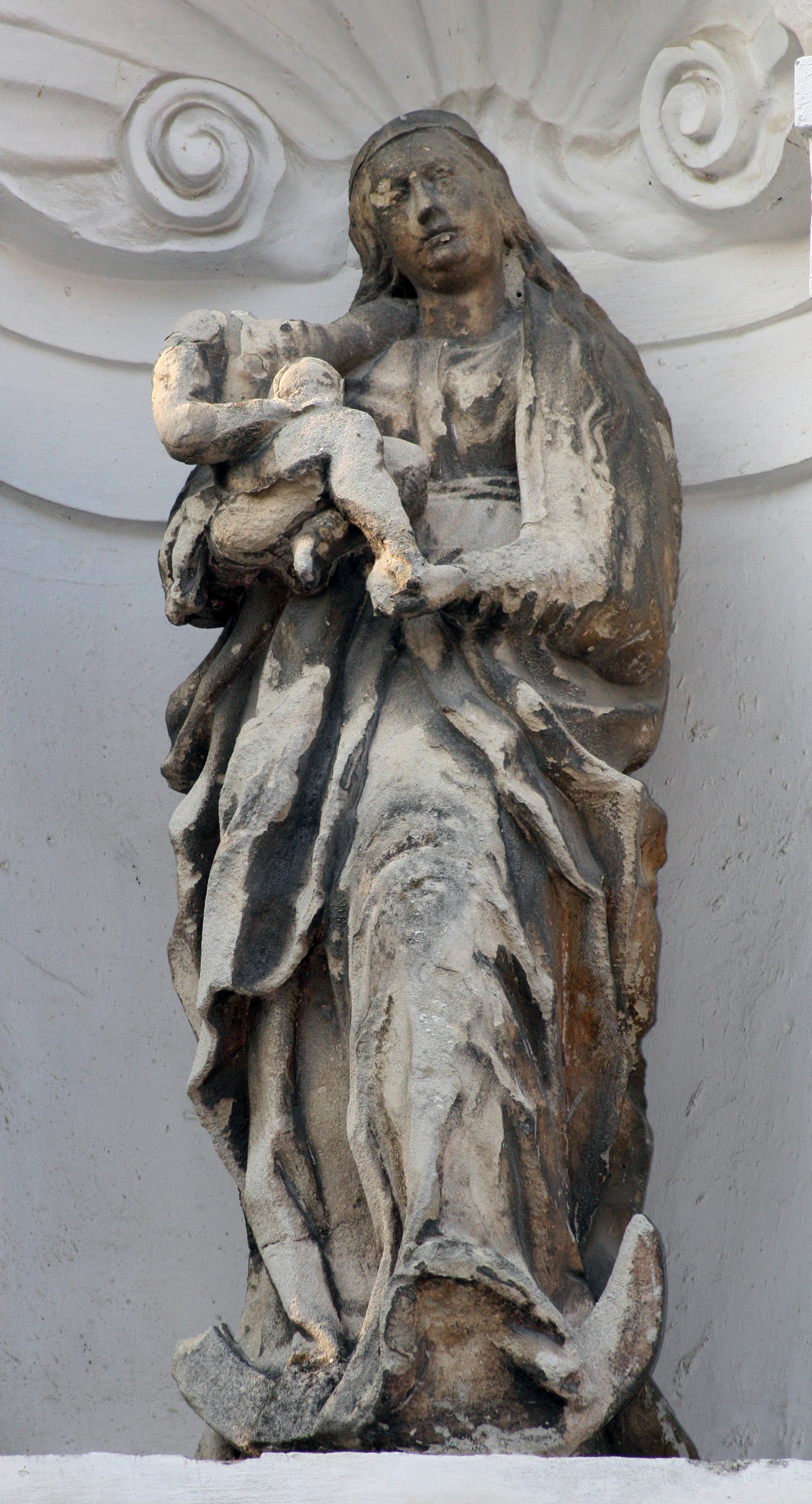
Sculpture on the walls of the Pálffy Palace

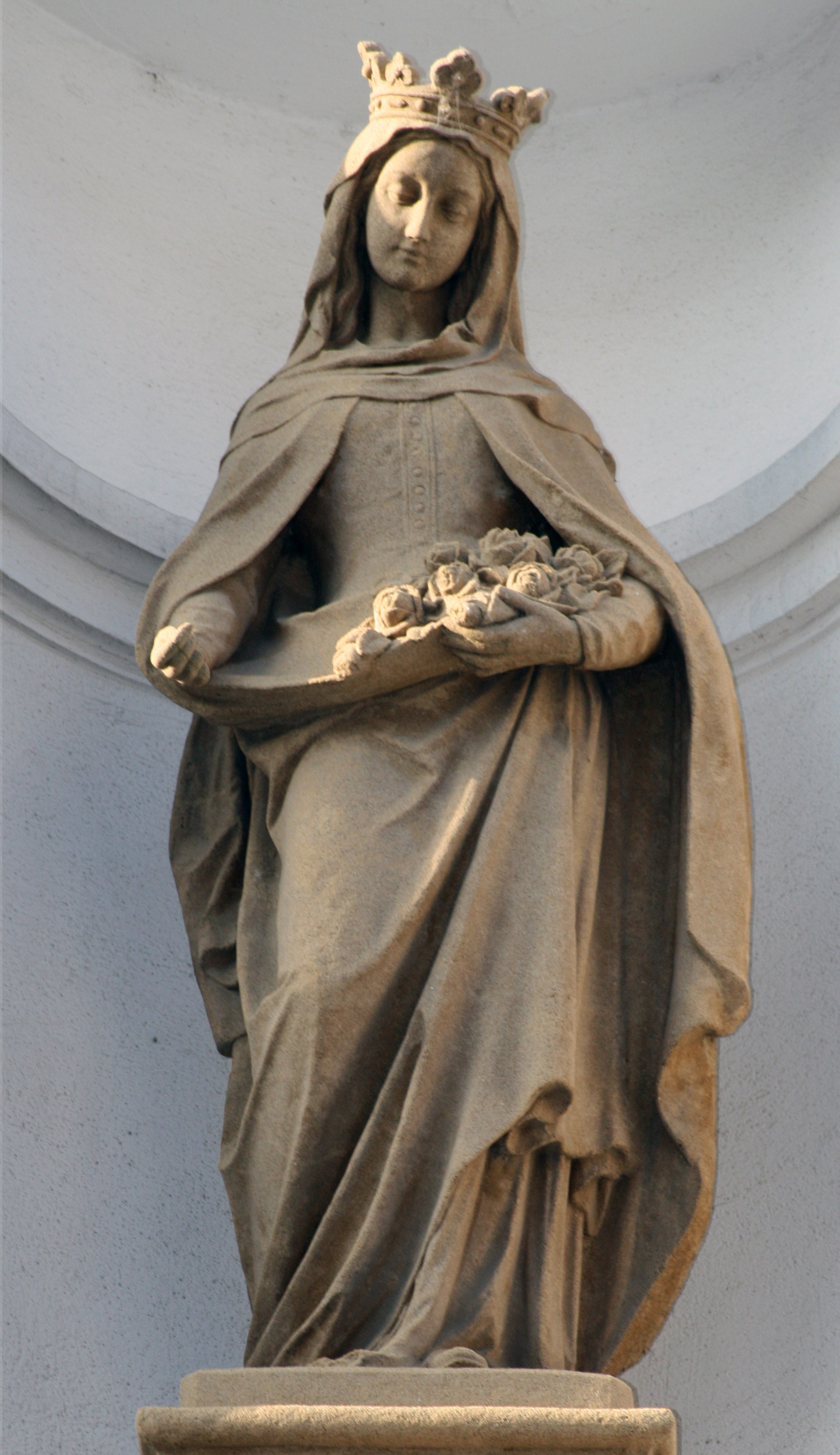
Sculpture on the walls of the Pálffy Palace

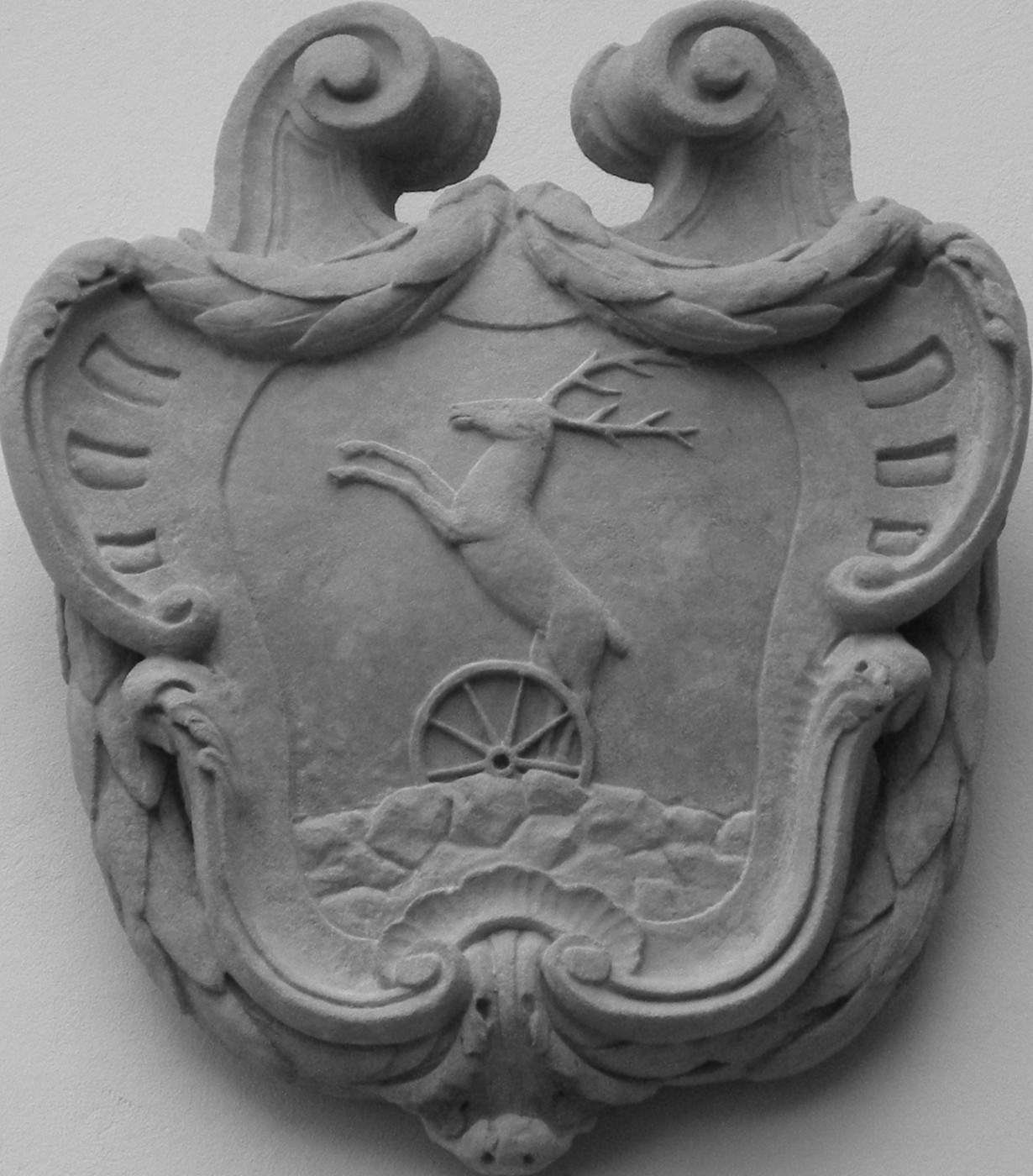
Coat of arms of Miklós III Pálffy on the palace entrance from Svoradova Street

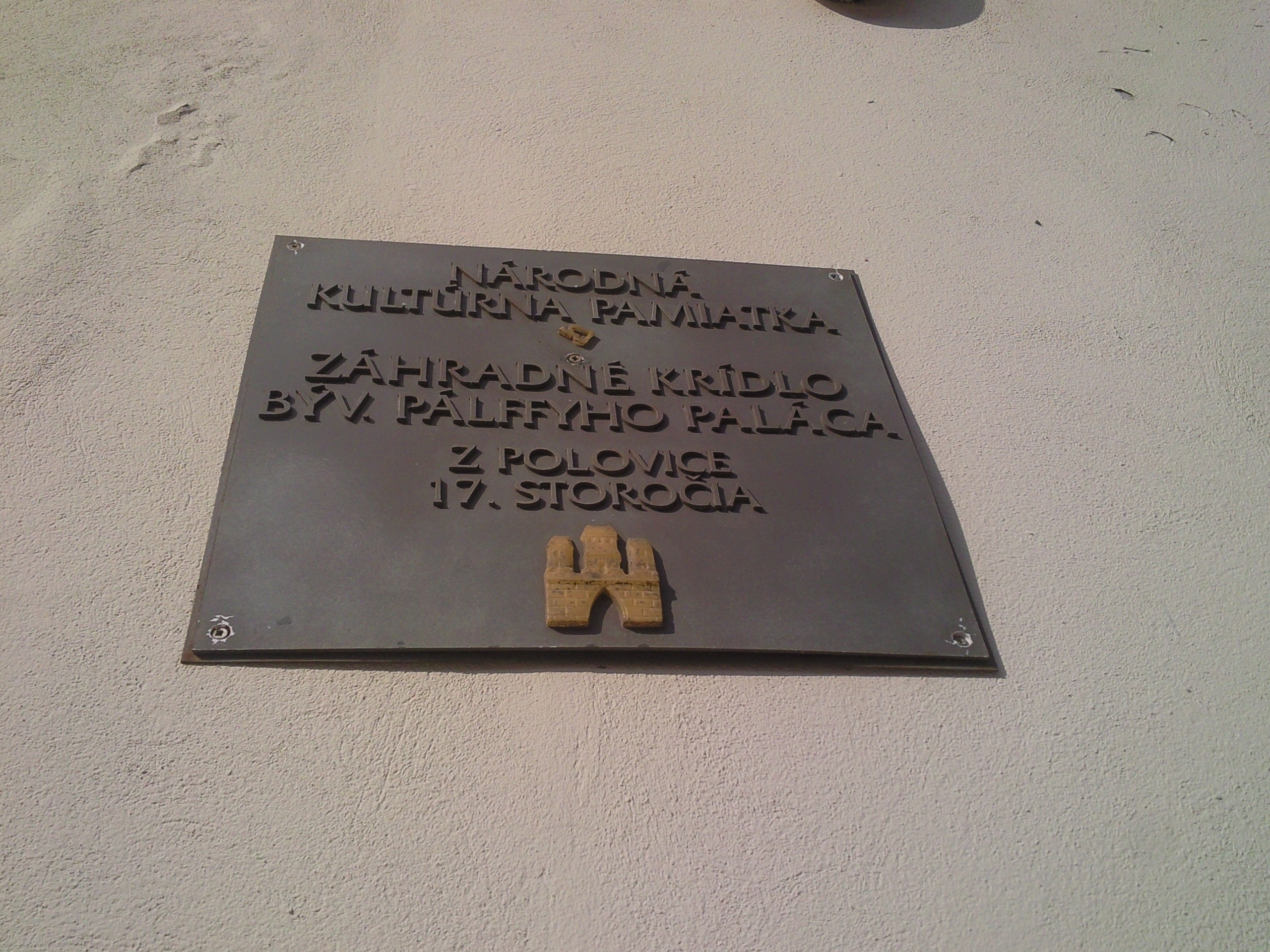
Memorial table on the walls of the Pálffy Palace

== See also ==
- History of Bratislava
- Zochova Street
- Parks and gardens in Bratislava
