= Parks and gardens in Bratislava =

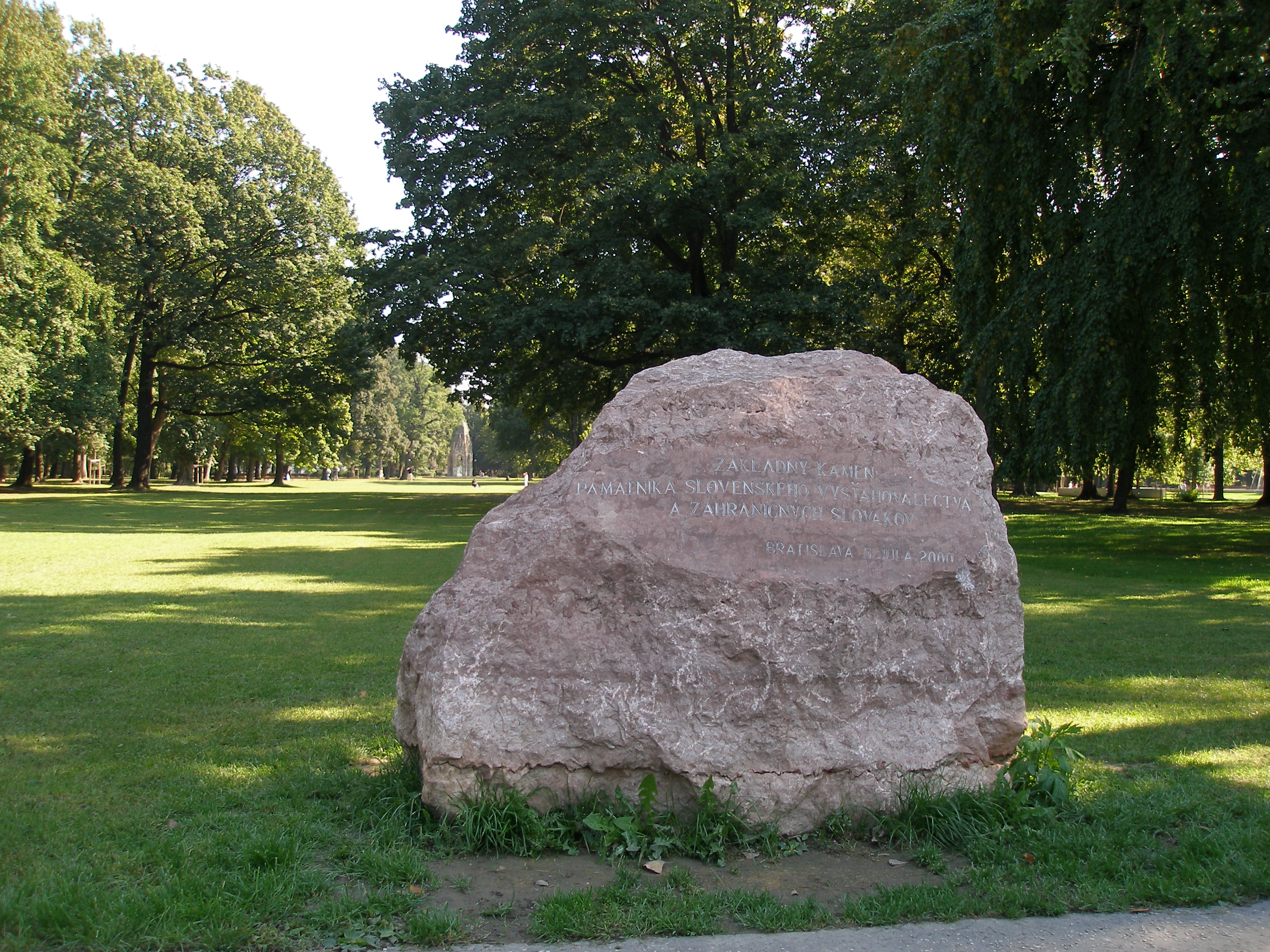
The Sad Janka Kráľa, Bratislava's most famous park

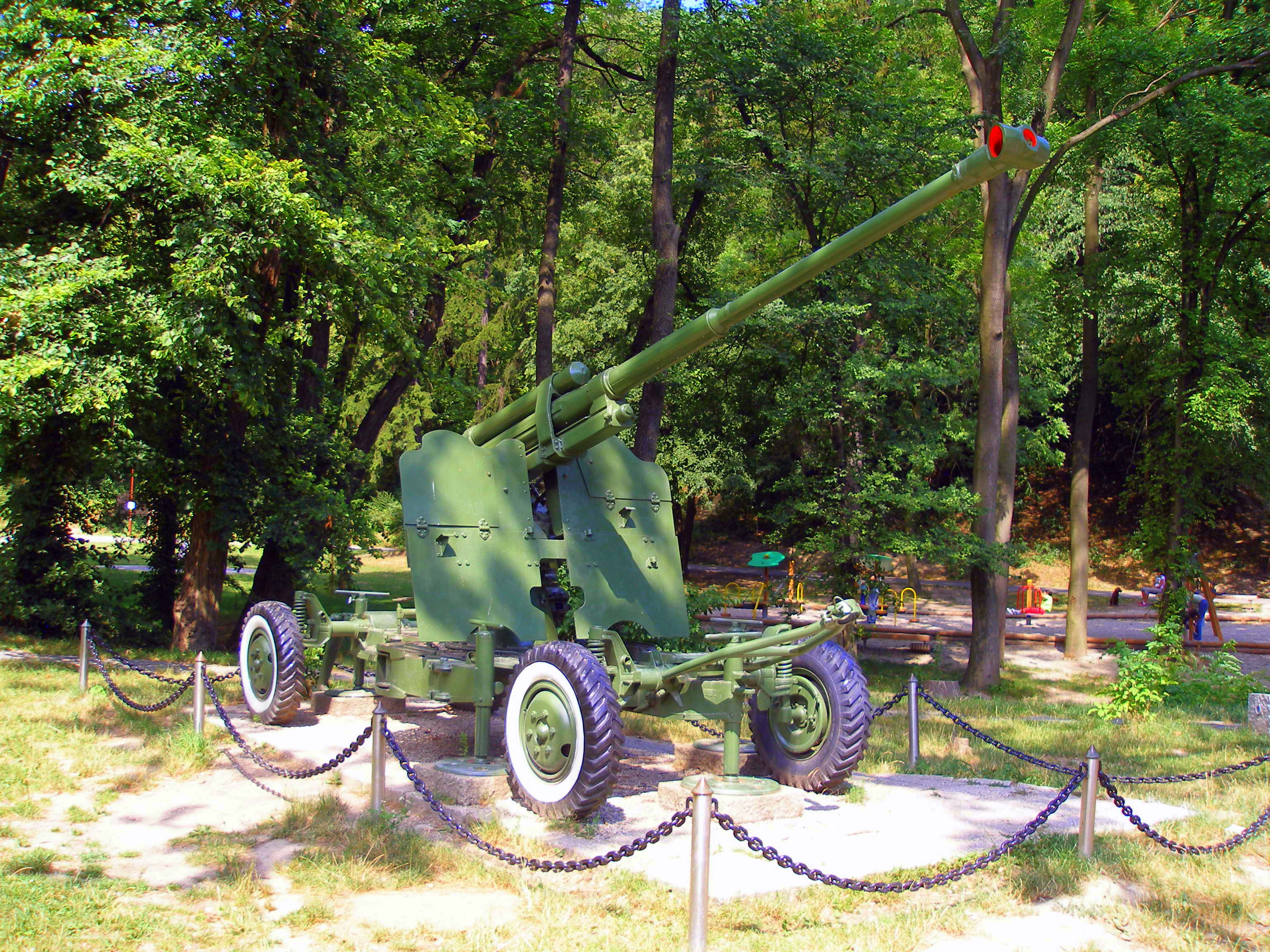
Bratislava Forest Park at the foothills of the Little Carpathians

The parks and gardens in Bratislava have formed a part of the landscape of the capital of Slovakia since the Middle Ages. Some of the historical gardens of Bratislava had such architectonic value that they were widely known outside of the city and well beyond the borders of the Kingdom of Hungary. Perhaps the best known garden in the city's history was the renaissance Pálffy Garden, with its famous landmark, a centuries-old linden tree encased in a wooden terrace frame, seven floors in height.

Today, Bratislava's most famous park is Sad Janka Kráľa, established in 1774-1776 it is the oldest public park in Central Europe. There are over 20 different caretakers of parks in Bratislava and all of the parks and gardens in the city lack long-term and consistent care. The level of park maintenance is low and the parks often lack functioning pathways, benches and lightning.

== Gothic gardens ==
There is basically no textual or pictorial evidence about gardens and parks from the Early Middle Ages and before. It wasn't until the High Middle Ages that gardens and parks expanded beyond the smallish utility gardens close to medieval cloisters and started to appear near castles, feudal mansions and rich citizens' townhouses. In Bratislava (known under many different names), the medieval cloisters of Cistercians, Franciscans, Order of Poor Clares and Order of Anthony the Great had small utility gardens and the Franciscans and Poor Clares Order also had so-called paradise gardens.

Bratislava's oldest surviving city plan is the Marquart plan, which was drawn by Michael Marquart Dissin. It dates from 1765, when the city was known as Pressburg or Poszony and its official name is GRUND = RIS Der KoenigL. Freyen Stadt Presburg. Mit beygefúgten Nahmen, aller inn = und Ausserlichen Kirchen, Cloester, Tehoere, Gassen und Häuser, So Anno 1765 Aufgenomen Worden ist (English: Ground plan of King's free city of Pressburg with attached names of all churches, cloisters, gates, streets and houses in both the inner and outer city as captured in 1765). There are few detailed descriptions of the parks and gardens in the city that existed prior to that date. The Marquart plan shows both the houses and parcels of land within Bratislava's mediaeval city walls and all the surrounding properties that were located outside the walls. The plots of land belonging to Bratislava Castle are only shown schematically, showing which parcels are built upon. The Marquart plan is a colorful map hand-drawn on four pieces of paper glued together to form one canvas of 1249 x 84 centimeters. It features numerous items besides the map itself - scale, author's signature, coat of arms of the Kingdom of Hungary, City of Pressburg, Hungarian crown, Explication in Der Stadt - a list of streets and buildings in the inner city, Explication in Denen Vorsted - a list of streets and buildings in the suburbs. All texts inside the map are in German language and Latin language.

There are four originally Gothic gardens inside the walled city depicted in the Marquart plan:

- Franciscan cloister garden - used partially for growing vegetables and herbs, but also for prayer and meditation.
- Ursulines cloister garden - used partially for growing vegetables and herbs, but also for prayer and meditation.
- Prepošt Palace garden on Kapitulská Street - the last relic of a relatively large medieval garden that was part of a Royal residence in the 14th and 15th centuries. It was used by Universitas Istropolitana at the end of the 15th century. A tiny patch of this garden survived until today behind the ground floor of the Prepošt Palace wing.
- unnamed garden surrounded by buildings on Kapitulská Street, Ventúrska Street, Prepoštská Street and Farská Street - the garden belonged to a townhouse that stood at the place of today's De Pauly house or Wittmann house which today, after reconstruction, serves the University Library of Bratislava. In the 21st century the remains of a medieval garden house were discovered inside the garden. The garden survived in its original size until today, and it is known as the Liszt Garden.

== Renaissance gardens ==
The two greatest Renaissance gardens were the demolished Pálffy Garden and the Lippay Garden, which has partially survived.

Written data relating to the green space between the Castle and the 'Palisades' dates back the 17th century. Situated on the slopes of the hills of the Small Carpathian Mountains, the area featured Carpathian oak and hornbeam forests, fruit gardens, vineyards and renowned flower gardens. The gardens contained so-called 'old horse chestnut' trees, often planted into tree alleys. They also contained native oak and linden trees, which have proved to be long-lived. The north-west slope of Bratislava Castle's hill contained three important gardens, Pálffy, Prepostská and Jesenák.

=== Pálffy Garden ===
The Pálffy Garden (Slovak: Pálffyho záhrada, German: Pálffygarten, Hungarian: Pálffykert) was a 17th-century Renaissance garden belonging to the Pálffy ab Erdöd family that was located on the slopes of Bratislava Foothills north of the walled city of Bratislava and east of the Bratislava Castle. Until the 19th century, it was considered to be unique and it used to be described as the pride of both Bratislava and the whole Kingdom of Hungary.

In the 1630s, Pál Pálffy (Hungarian: Pál III Pálffy), a palatine of Hungary, was charged with reconstructing the Bratislava Castle. He decided to build a palace for himself on the castle hill in the area of Podhradie. In around 1640, he bought extensive vineyards on the slopes of the Little Carpathians next to his palace and turned them into garden terraces, reinforced with walls. Some of the remnants of these walls still exist on Zochova Street and Svoradova Street. They are the oldest walls in Bratislava outside of the fortifications of the city and Bratislava Castle's fortification system.

The garden was located between today's Zámocká Street, Škarniclova Street, Palisády Street, Zochova Street and Pilárikova Street. It was a very long but quite narrow terraced garden almost 4 hectares (9.9 acres) in area and it was located on a hillside. It consisted mostly of terraces and tree alleys. The garden was first styled as a french garden but it was later turned in an english garden. The spacious garden contained several exotic plants, grottos, statues and fountains. It was divided into several parts. Its most striking attraction was a massive linden tree that was completely surrounded by wooden scaffolding and which allowed Count Pálffy's guests to admire the scent of linden flowers while enjoying the view. The tree is depicted on a 1735 copperplate by M. Engelbrecht and F. B. Werner. The construction that surrounded the tree was onion-shaped and seven floors high.

In 1801, the garden was opened to the public. It became a popular place for social gatherings but by the end of the 19th century, it became neglected and became frequented only by the city poor. In 1905, historian Tivadar Ortvay describes the Pálffy Garden as a decrepit public garden, with plans for its demolition and division into construction lots.

The garden featured the Pálffy Hall, which served as a riding hall, housed public happenings, cultural events, and briefly also theatrical productions. The Hall was demolished in 1893 and replaced by the State Real School (today the building of Academy of Performing Arts in Bratislava). Soon afterwards, other buildings started to be built within the garden next to it – Jewish schools, a maternity hospital, school for midwives and a children's shelter.

After 1900, the garden was gradually replaced by new schools and campuses. Today, the last remaining remnant of the garden is a large hole near Podjavorinskej Street. The remainders of what was a large gardening enterprise can still be seen in the area.

=== Prepoštská Garden ===
The Prepoštská Garden (Slovak: Prepoštská záhrada, Prepoštský dvor) was a large garden located between Pálffy Garden and Heindl Garden, at the end of today's Kozia Street. Podjavorinskej Street is located within the garden's boundaries.

It was grown with vineyards and fruit trees but also contained homestead buildings, some ploughed land and a vegetable shop, both leased out. Also, herbs were grown in this garden which were subscribed and delivered to the neighboring Slubek's distillery (Slovak: Slubekov liehovar a likérka). After the garden was divided into parcels, a new street was created at its place, named after Pressburg citizen, merchant and banker Teodor Edl - Edlova Street (today Podjavorinskej Street), and it was gradually replaced by houses on Zochova Street and Kozia Street.

=== Jesenák Garden ===
Jesenák Garden was located at the north-east point of Prepoštská Garden and it belonged to baron Jan Jesenák. It was famous for its linden trees.

=== Lippay Garden ===
This garden was acquired between the years 1607 to 1616 by the archbishop of Esztergom František Forgách as the place of the future summer residence of the Hungarian Primates' (highest ranking church officials in the country at that time).

Archbishop Georg Lippay (who was archbishop from 1642 to 1666) had the garden converted into a renaissance garden of Eden by filling it with exotic plants and trees, fountains that used water taken from the mountain springs, artificial caves and a big water pool where horses used to bathe. The garden's masterpiece was a garden pavilion with walls encased in mosaic and streams of water flowing through a musical instrument similar to an organ. The structure even had streams of water ejected upwards from the roof. This garden's configuration did not last long and already in the 1730s parts of the garden's fountains started to appear in various other fountains in Bratislava. The pavilion did not survive this period either. Lippay also had a new summer residence built on this property sometime during his tenure as archbishop.

== Baroque gardens ==
The most important Baroque gardens in Bratislava are the Koch Garden, which is inaccessible to the public, the Grassalkovich Garden and the Medical Garden.

=== Koch Garden ===
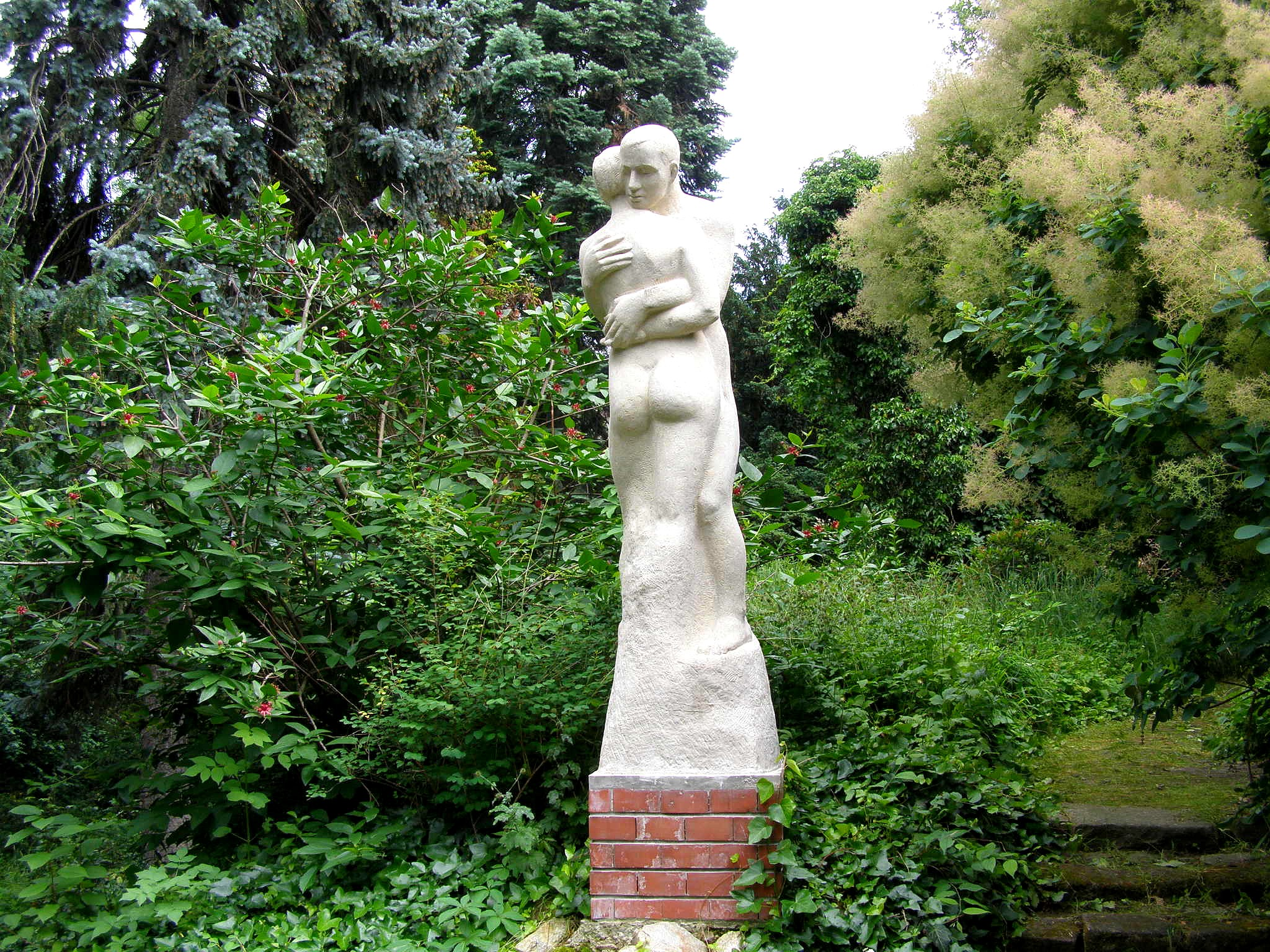
Statue inside the Koch Garden

Koch Garden is a protected area on Partizánska Street in Bratislava, established in the 1930s as part of the Karol Koch Sanatorium complex. It contains a large pool and many items of garden architecture such as benches, staircases, artificial hills, statues and winding walkways. Slovak botanist and dendrologist Jozef Mišák established an extremely varied and exotic garden. His goal was to achieve the garden's green look all around the year. The garden originally included 120 species of trees.

Today, it is an important bird nesting site in the city, because of its virtual lack of human presence.

== Current issues ==
Since 1993 all formerly municipal green areas are taken care of by the 17 city boroughs.

Currently, the most endangered park in Bratislava is the Park on Belopotockého Street. After 15 years of civic activity to save the park, as of 2012, there is no construction at the place of the park, but the park itself is destroyed.

=== Future park construction ===
On Komenského square (formerly Pállfy square) behind the old building of the Slovak National Theatre, there used to be a small city park. In 1972 the addition to the National Theatre was finished here and the rest of the former park was converted into an asphalt parking lot. During Slovakia's European Union presidency in 2016 the parking lot was assigned for the special needs of the Ministry of Foreign Affairs and after the presidency ended, there were plans to turn the area back into a pocket city park. City of Bratislava planned to construct the park (named Park Komenského) in 2018 but nobody entered the competition to construct it. The park will be constructed in 2019 by the company ERPOS at the cost of 375,260.32 euro.

In April 2011, the Mayor of Karlova Ves Iveta Hanulíková publicly presented a plan to establish a new park in the Karlova Ves district of Bratislava, located in an area called Riviéra next to Karloveská Street between the Shell gas station and the Allianz company building. The park (named Mestský park pri Karloveskej ulici) will be constructed in 2019 by the company MBM-GROUP at the cost of 289,393.45 euro.

== List of Bratislava's parks ==
The following is a list of parks and gardens in Bratislava:

Image	Name (original name)	Location	Notes
	Liszt Garden (Lisztova záhrada)	behind houses on Kapitulská Street, Ventúrska Street, Prepoštská Street and Farská Street near the University Library of Bratislava	The continuation of a medieval garden with a late Baroque pavilion built in the second half of the 18th century. Today, the garden is named after Franz Liszt, despite the artist never visiting it. Not accessible to the public, access to the garden is limited to guests of various cultural events organized there.
	Sad Janka Kráľa (Sad Janka Kráľa)	Petržalka, next to the Danube, near the Aupark shopping centre.	Oldest public park in Central Europe, established in 1774–1776.
	Summer Archbishop's Palace Garden (Záhrada Letného arcibiskupského paláca)	Old Town around the Summer Archbishop's Palace.	The garden is the remnant of the famous Lippay Garden and it is inaccessible to the public.
	Grassalkovich Palace Garden (Prezidentská záhrada)	Old Town behind the Grassalkovich Palace between Štefánikova Street and Banskobystrická Street.	The garden is guarded by a security service and it is open only during opening hours.
	Poor Clares Garden (Záhrada Klarisiek)	Old Town, behind the walls of the Poor Clares Cloister on Klariská Street.	N/A
	Medic Garden (Medická záhrada)	Old Town, near the Ondrejský Cemetery.	Open only during opening hours.
	Bratislava Forest Park (Bratislavský lesný park)	Nové Mesto, Rača and Záhorská Bystrica districts near Patrónka at the foothills of Pezinok Carpahtians.	The park covers an area of 27.3 km^{2} (10.54 mi^{2}), of which 96% is forested.
	Horský Park (Horský Park)	Old Town on the foothills near the Bratislava Castle and the Slavín monument.	The park covers an area of 22 hectares and it was established in 1868 by the Mayor of Bratislava Henrich Justi in an area called "Študentský les" (Student Forest). Numerous items were constructed in the park over the years, including: pathways, benches, nest boxes and plaquettes with poems from local poets.
	Račianske mýto Park (Park pri Račianskom mýte)	Račianske mýto, Šancová Street	N/A
	Garden of the Bratislava Water Company (Záhrada Bratislavskej vodárenskej spoločnosti)	Karlova Ves, Devínska cesta, by the Bratislava Water Museum in the Karloveská zátoka.	The garden covers an area of 3 hectares and includes besides the Water Museum building from the year 1886 also a greenhouse from 1924 and a historical swimming pool of the Chief of the Water Company. The garden is inaccessible to the public.
	Park of the Slovak National Uprising (Park SNP)	Karlova Ves, Líščie údolie	N/A
	Park of Andrej Hlinka (Park A. Hlinku)	Ružinov, Ružinovská Street	N/A
	Pekníkova Street Park (Park na Pekníkovej)	Dúbravka, Pekníková Street	N/A
	Union Park (Park Družby)	Dúbravka, in front of elementary school at Beňovského Street	N/A
	Pečniansky Forest (Pečniansky les)	Petržalka	N/A
	Markova Street Park (Park na Markovej)	Petržalka, Markova Street	N/A
	Vrakuňa Forest Park (Lesopark Vrakuňa)	Vrakuňa	N/A
	Rusovce Mansion Garden (Rusovský park)	Rusovce	Established in the second half of the 18th century.

Parkettes:

Image	Name (original name)	Location	Notes
	Little Roman Park (Rímsky parčík)	Rusovce	Tiny park with a drinking fountain, constructed in 2006–2007.

Other places considered to be parks:
(Squares)

- Americké námestie
- Hviezdoslavovo námestie
- Kollárovo námestie
- Námestie Slobody
- Nobelovo námestie
- Šafárikovo námestie

(Riverbanks)

- Park kultúry a oddychu (Staré Mesto)
- Rázusovo nábrežie (Staré Mesto)
- Fajnorovo nábrežie (Staré Mesto)
- Vajanského nábrežie (Staré Mesto)
- Dvořákovo nábrežie (Staré Mesto)
- Nábrežie arm. gen. L. Svobodu (Staré Mesto)
- Tyršovo nábrežie (Petržalka)
- Slovanské nábrežie (Devín)

(Other)

- Bratislava Zoo
- Botanical Garden of the Comenius University

The list does not include the city's cemeteries and children's playgrounds.

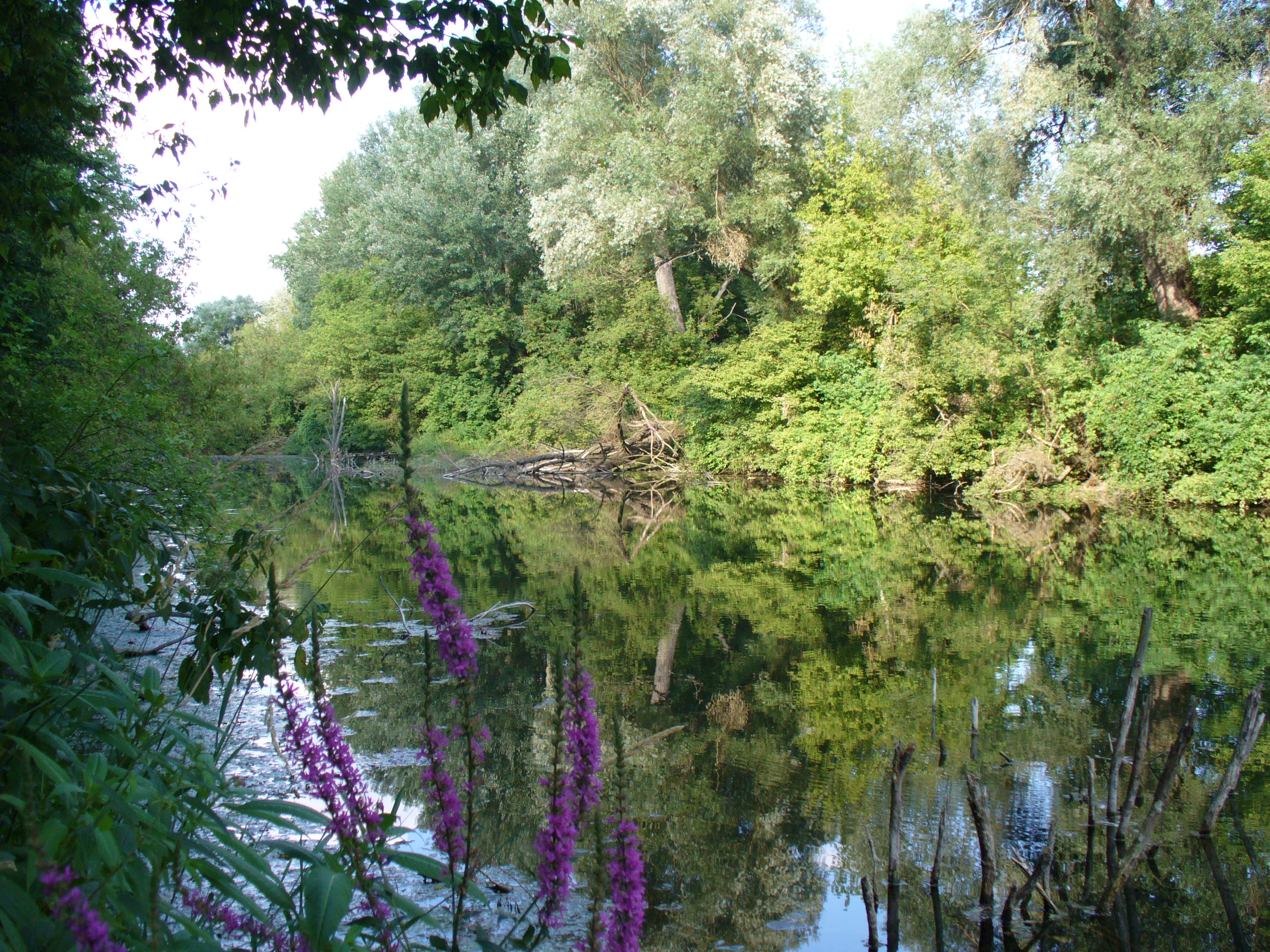
Dunajské luhy

== Protected landscape areas ==
- Little Carpathians Protected Landscape Area
  - Devínska Kobyla National Nature Reserve
  - Sandberg Nature Reserve
- Dunajské luhy
- Sihoť island

== Gallery ==
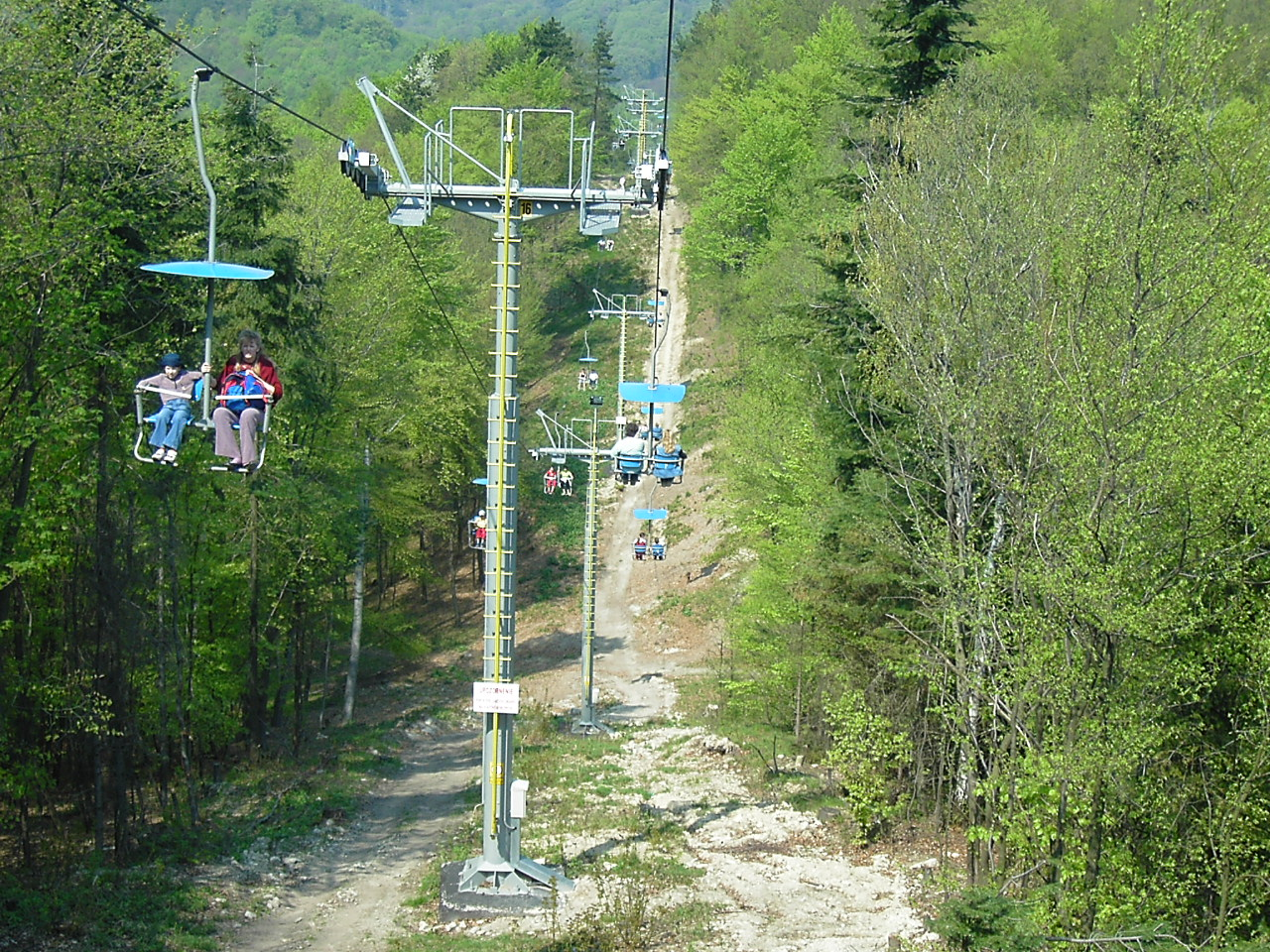
Cableway to Kamzík in the Bratislava Forest Park

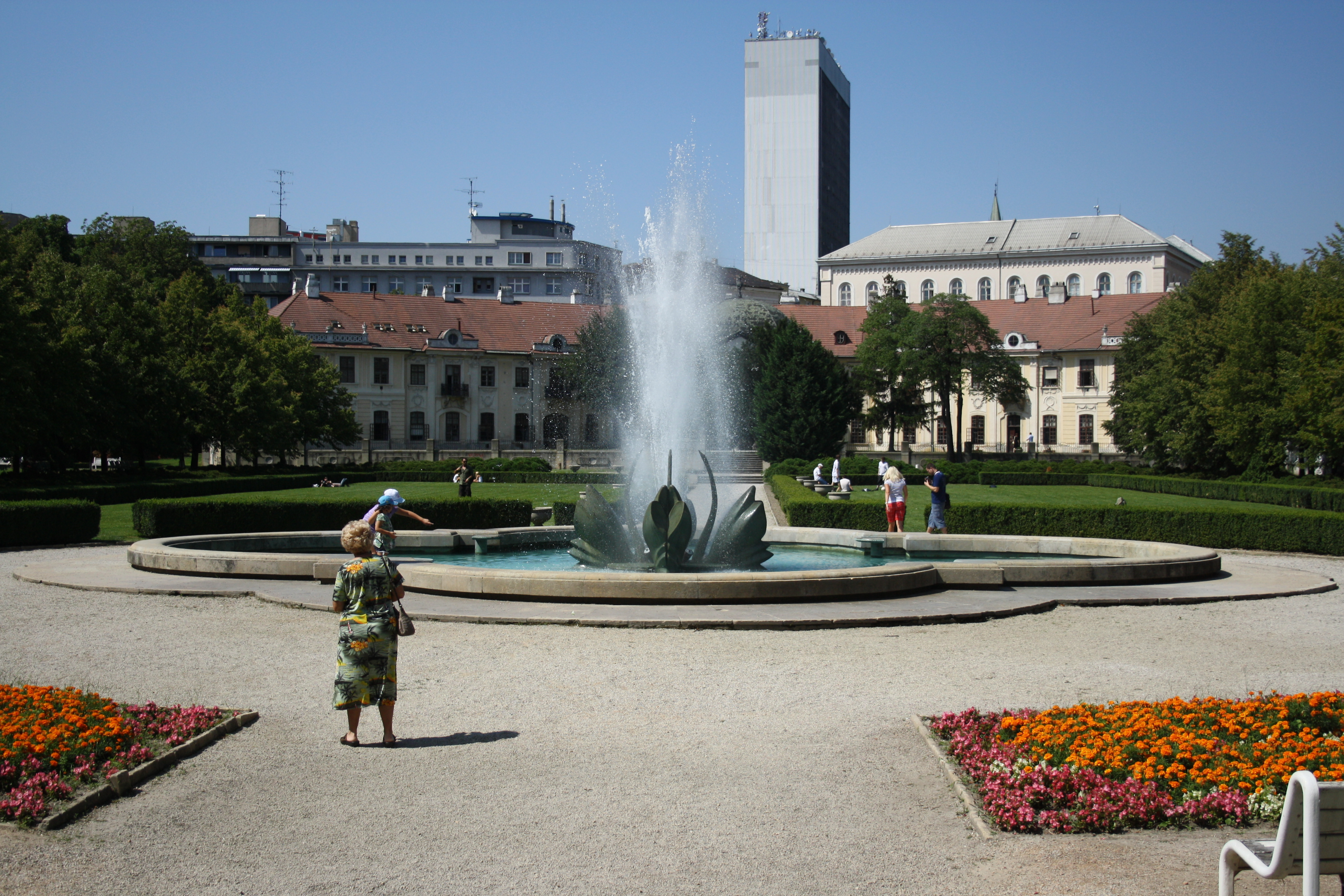
Medic Garden

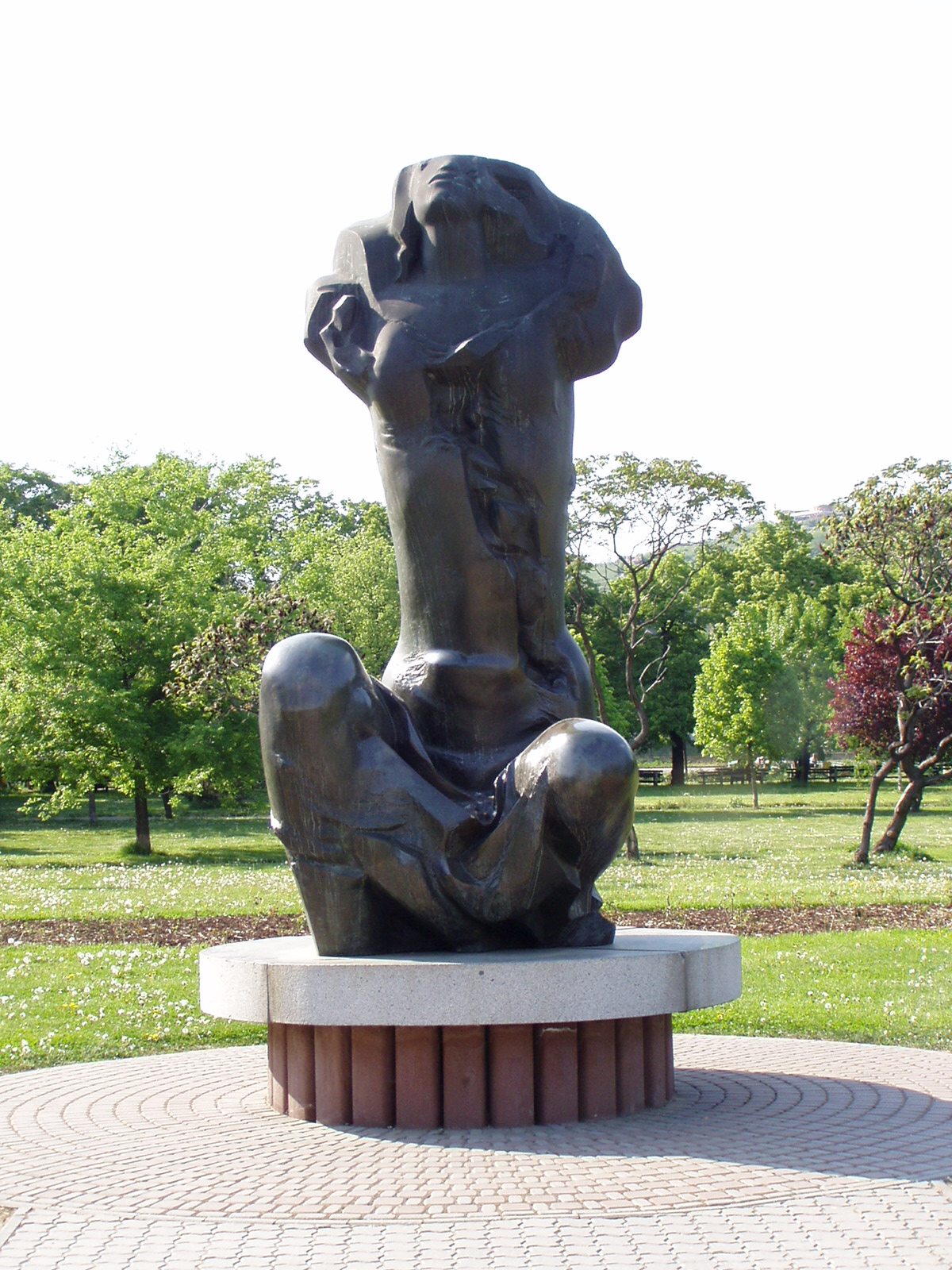
Račianske mýto, edge of the park

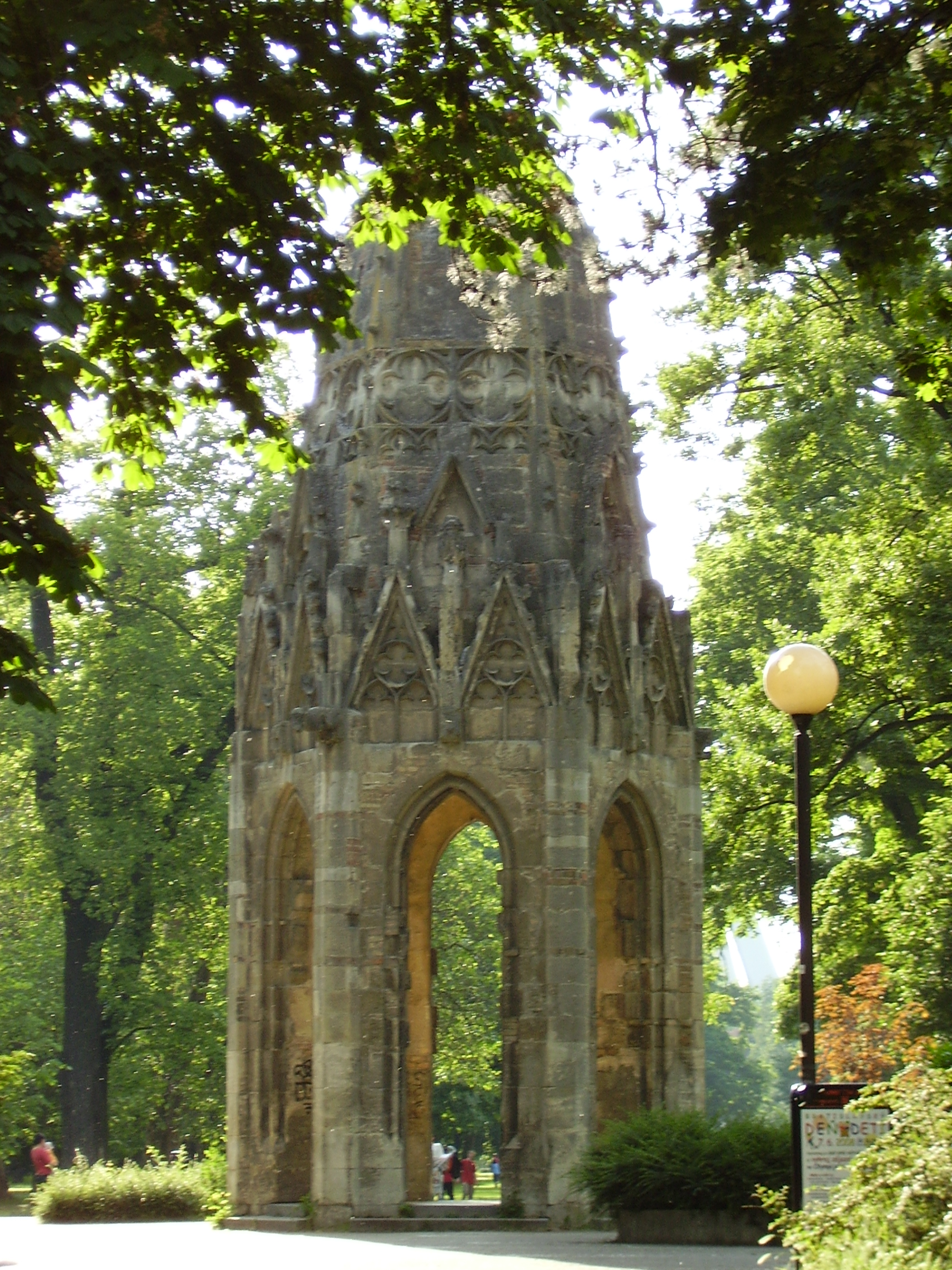
Gothic tower in Sad Janka Kráľa, originally from the Franciscan Church in the Old Town

== See also ==
- List of fountains in Bratislava
- History of Bratislava
