= Svoradov =

Coordinates: 48.1456°N 17.1005°E

- Svoradov
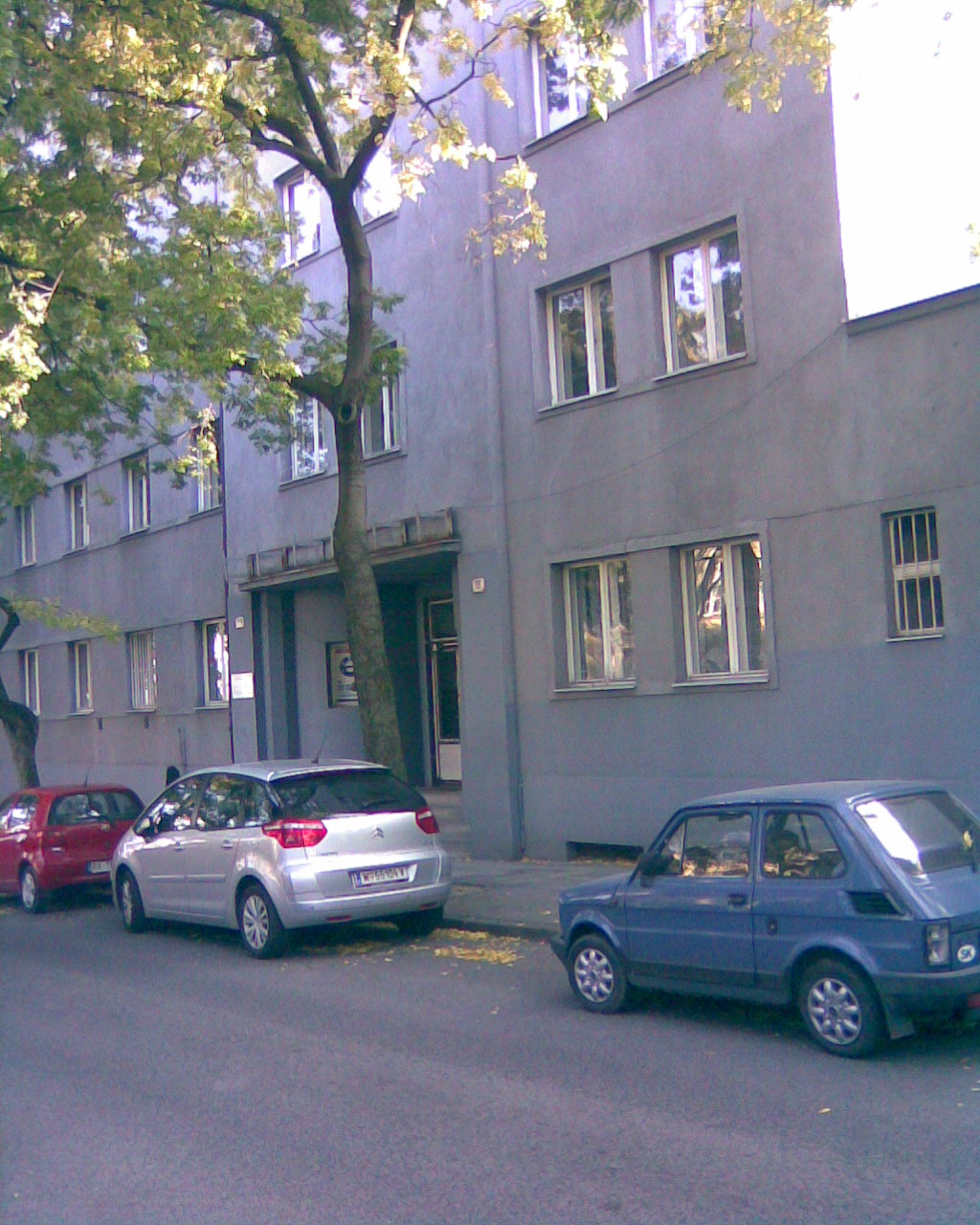
- Main entrance of Svoradov campus
- Interactive map of the Svoradov area

General information
- Type: University campus
- Location: Bratislava, Slovakia, Svoradova 13, 811 03, Bratislava; Phone number (reception): +421 0918 664 041
- Completed: 1926 (Old Svoradov); 1928 (New Svoradov)
- Cost: 1 100 000 Czechoslovak crowns
- Landlord: Slovak Technical University

Svoradov (Slovak: internát Svoradov) is a university student campus on Svoradova Street in the Old Town of Bratislava, Slovakia. It was the first modern campus building in Bratislava, first parts being constructed in 1932. Svoradov was an important place for the forming of Slovak Catholic intelligentsia from its inception, until the end of Second World War and its founding fathers included the ultra-conservative Andrej Hlinka and the war criminal Jozef Tiso.

Currently it is operated by the Slovak Technical University; it contains 309 student rooms, 18 guest rooms and a gym. The student rooms contain 1-3 beds (guest rooms 1-2 beds) and they are free to rent for the public from July to August each year.

Svoradov is also the name of a grocery store nearby the campus at Palisády Street No. 2.

== History ==
After establishing the Comenius University in Bratislava in 1919 the problem of student housing emerged, because the city was essentially lacking a university campus. Priest Eugen Filkorn was tasked to establish a campus, because he already had experience in providing similar services under Austria-Hungary. In 1922, Filkorn made a deal with the Orphanage of Saint Elisabeth (Slovak: Sirotinec svätej Alžbety), whose building stood at the site of current Svoradov, to house students. The premises soon turned out to be unsuited and wet and the construction of a new campus building was decided. For this reason, the Company of the Collegium of Saint Svorad (Slovak: Spolok Kolégia sv. Svorada) was established to collect money from the people. The Company was supervising both the construction and later the operation of the campus. Its prominent members included Andrej Hlinka, Jozef Tiso, Ferdiš Juriga and Tomáš Ružička.

During World War II, the campus housed the Higher leadership school of the Hlinka youth and the Academic Hlinka Guard, paramilitary organisations under the clerofascist regime of the Slovak State.

Priest Eugen Filkorn, who was the founder and later director of campus Svoradov was tried after the war and he was sentenced to 2 years in prison in 1947.

== Campus regime ==
Everybody had to wake up at 7.00 a.m., attend a mass, then breakfast, lectures, lunch break at 12.00 noon, afterwards more lectures, at 6.00 p.m. dinner, then mass and then study until 11.00 p.m. Smoking at the rooms was allowed, but it was forbidden to carry out political actions.

== Notable people ==
- Gustáv Husák, future communist President of Czechoslovakia
- Andrej Žarnov, catholic modernist writer and physician
- Karol Sidor, anti-semite politician, future Minister of the Interior of Slovak State
- Ferdinand Ďurčanský, war criminal sentenced to death, future Minister for Home and Foreign Affairs of Slovak State
- Július Stano
- Jozef M. Kirschbaum
- Anton Neuwirth
- Jozef Vicen
- Gustáv Valach, actor
- Fantišek Hrušovský, historian
- Belo Polla, archeologist
- Štefan Hoza, operatic singer
- lawyers: Vojtech Marko, Július Virsiko, Františkek Braxátor
- František Sýkora, medical doctor
- Imrich Kružliak, journalist
- Jozef August Mikuš, diplomat
- Ladislav Záborský, painter
- Severín Zrubec, poet

== See also ==
- History of Bratislava
- Zochova Street
- Parks and gardens in Bratislava
