= Zochova =

Street in Bratislava

Coordinates: 48.15°N 17.1°E

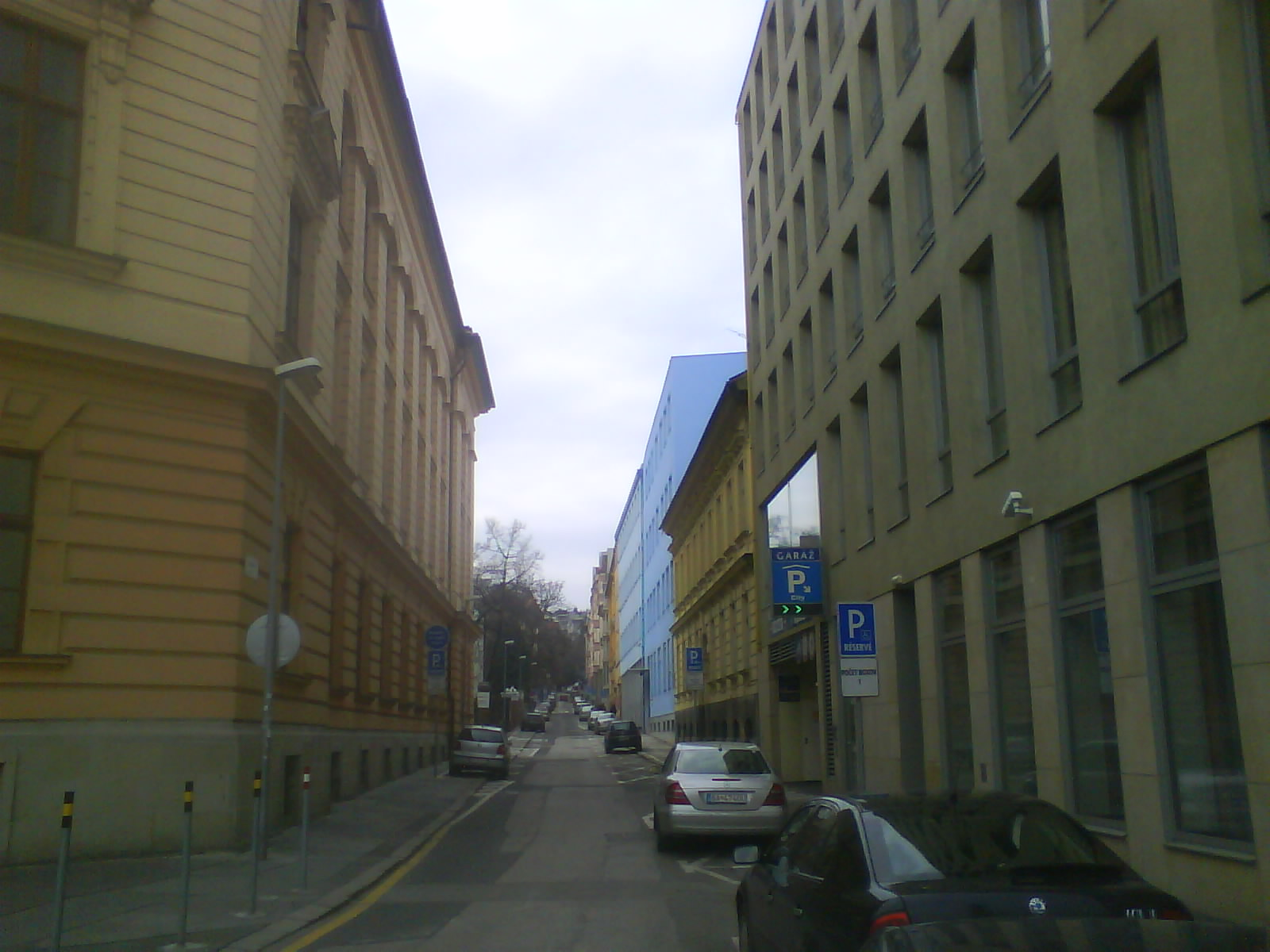
Looking up Zochova Street

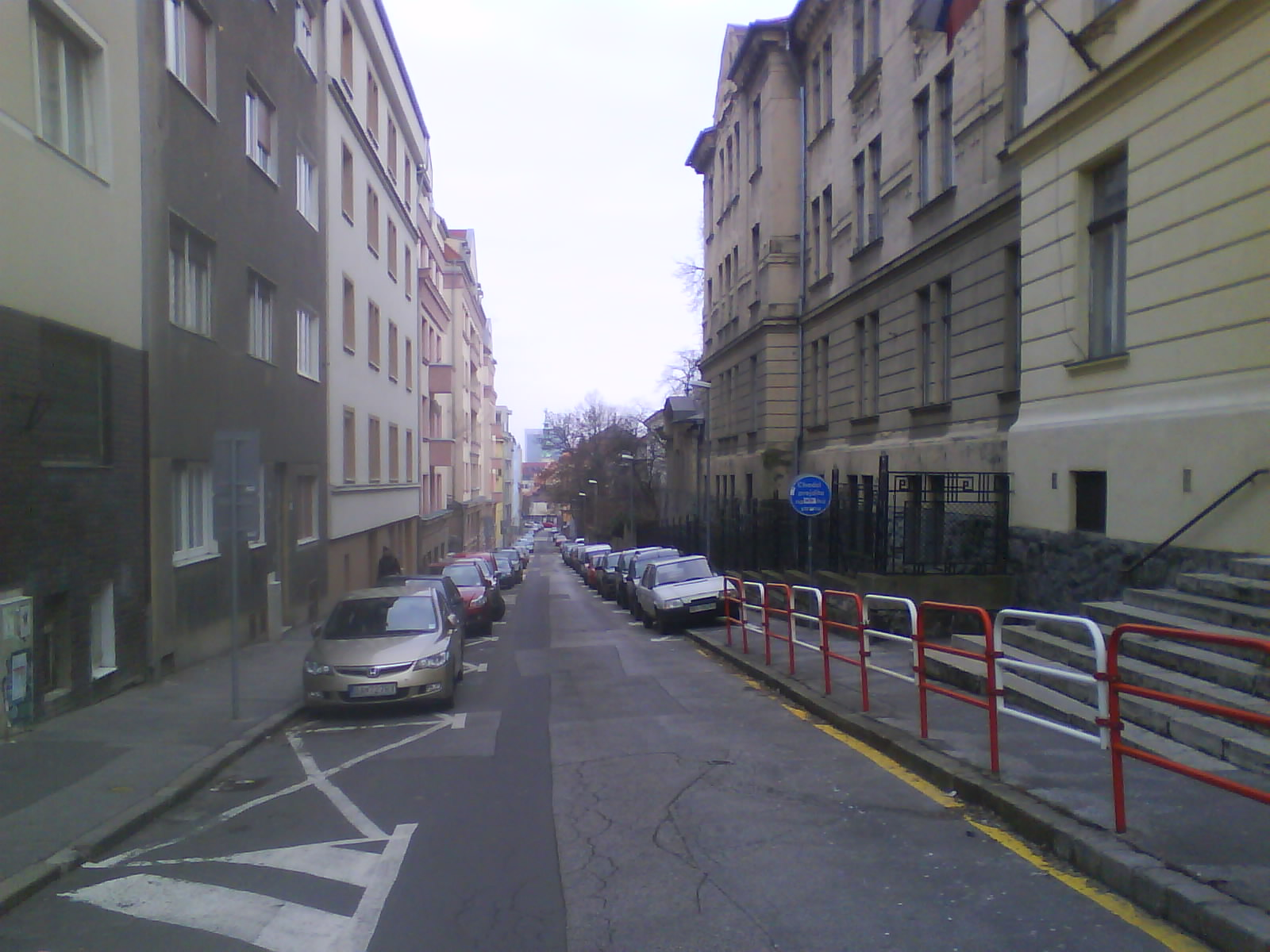
Looking down Zochova Street

Zochova Street (Slovak: Zochova ulica) is a street in Bratislava's Old Town and Zochova is the name of a major bus stop in Bratislava, located at the point where the street touches Staromestská Street, next to Nový Most in Bratislava, Slovakia. the lower half of the street formed part of the Old Town of medieval Pressburg, with the first written account confirming its existence dating from the 14th century. Zochova Street is located just 5 minutes walking distance from the historical city center and 5 minutes walking distance from the Presidential palace at Hodžovo námestie.

== Name ==
Since 1930, the street has been named after Samuel Zoch (1882–1928), Slovak evangelical bishop and politician, the co-author of the Declaration of the Slovak Nation (Deklarácia slovenského národa) from October 30, 1918. Zoch served also as the Župan of Bratislavská župa and the city of Bratislava from 1918 to 1919.

== History ==
While the lower part of the street has existed since the Middle Ages, the upper part above the intersection with today's Podjavorinskej Street was created in the second half of the 19th century. The street is first mentioned in a tax register from 1379 under the name of Sluttergasse. Its name comes from the dirt silts from the hill above during storm time. In 1439, the street included 17 houses, one majer, 7 gardens, a water well, evangelical cemetery and a tavern. New houses were built over time. During that time, the street was mostly home to winemakers, potters and carpenters but also painters and customs men. Throughout the Middle Ages, this area of Pressburg was known to be home mostly to craftsmen. At least since 1536 the street was named Turnergasse (meaning "Practice Street"). In the 18th century it is named Schluder Gassel. Before the street received its current name in 1930, it was called Telocvičná Street (meaning "Fitness Street").

Many of today's buildings are the result of the splitting of two large gardens – Prepoštská Garden in 1873 and Pálffy Garden in 1890. Prepoštská Garden (also called Prepoštský dvor) was located at the place of Podjavorinskej Street and was 5289 square fathoms in area. It contained homestead buildings, some ploughed land and a vegetable shop, both leased out. Also, herbs grown in this garden were subscribed and delivered to the neighboring Slubek's distillery (Slubekov liehovar a likérka). After the garden was divided into parcels, a new street was created at the place of the former garden named after Pressburg citizen, merchant and banker Teodor Edl – Edlova Street (today Podjavorinskej Street), as well as many houses on Zochova Street and Kozia Street. Pálffy Garden was situated on a hill between Zámocká Street, Škarniclova Street, Palisády Street, Zochova Street and Pilárikova Street. One of the other gardens mentioned is Heindl's garden (Heindlova záhrada) next to Prepoštská Garden.

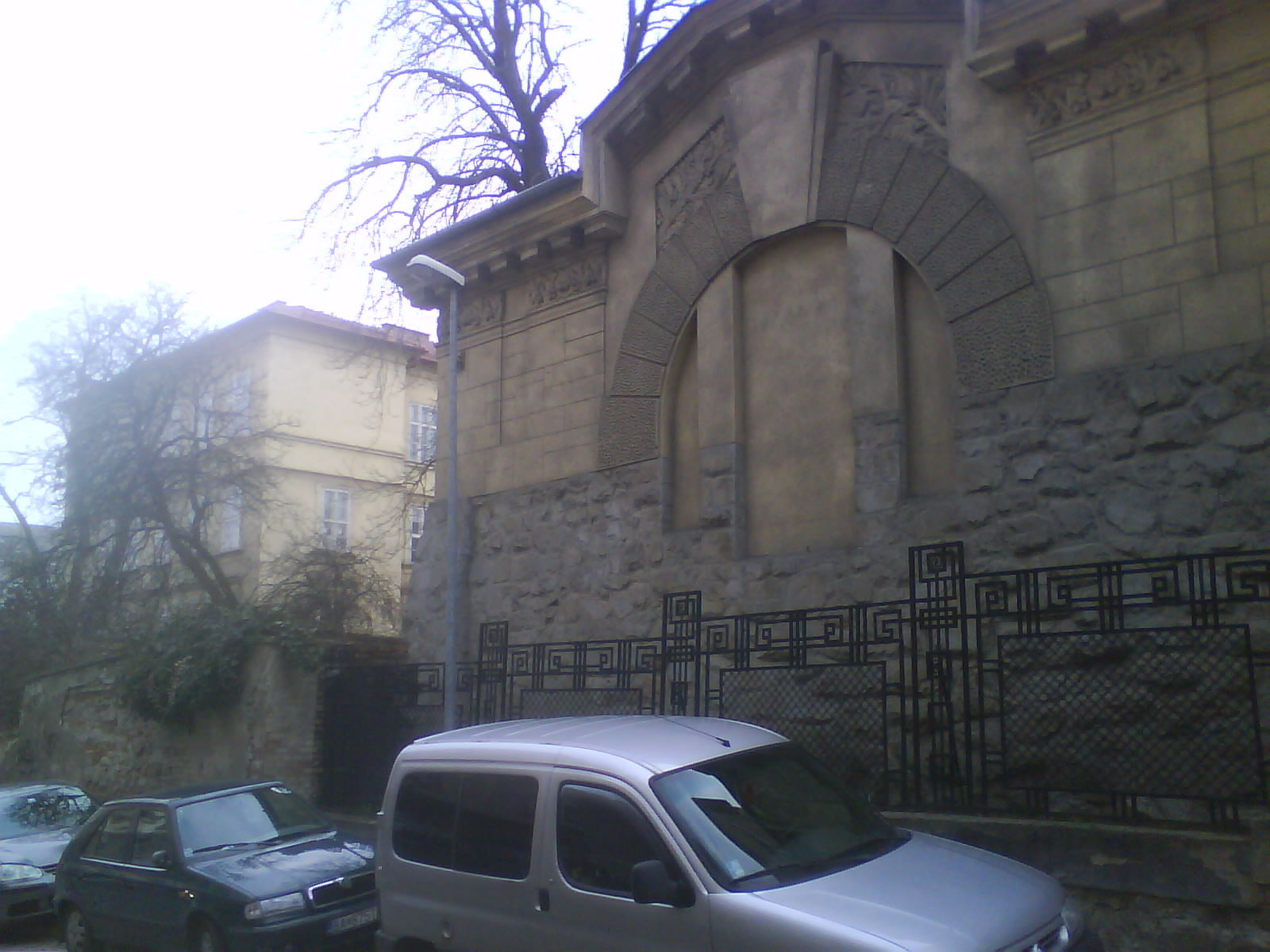
Remains of the stone wall surrounding the Pálffy Garden visible on the left

Today, the oldest structure on the street is a short remnant of a stone wall at the upper part of the street next to the elementary school, which is the original wall of the huge former Pálffy Garden next to the mansion of Miklós Pálffy from mid-17th century. The second oldest existing structure is a maternity hospital and a school for midwives (officially: Bratislavská uhorsko-kráľovská škola pre pôrodné baby) built in 1882 according to a project by Ignác Feigler Jr. Its initiator, founder and first director was Dr. Ján Ambra from Beckov. The building later housed the maternity and gynaecology clinic of Comenius University in Bratislava. Today, all medical services have been cancelled, but in the late 2000s the abandoned hospital building still contained needles, chemicals, patients' private documentation and a small child preserved in formaldehyde (presumably a teaching aid), as discovered over time by children from the nearby school. There is a dispute over the ownership of the building's contents between the Faculty Hospital of Bratislava and the Medical Faculty of Comenius University in Bratislava. Before World War II, the building was expanded. A modern wing containing maternity wards and operation rooms was added by Alexander Feigler. Even with this change, the building is (together with the original fence) a unique example of 19th century urbanisation in Pressburg.

The maternity hospital was soon followed by the building of the state real school and a Jewish school. At the end of the 19th and the beginning of the 20th century, new schools were built on the street. Two Jewish schools were followed a few years later by a meštianska school and another one at the edge of Zochova and Palisády Street. The latter building is an eclectic two-storey house with many details. Today, the building is home to Electrotechnics High School (Stredná priemyselná škola elektrotechnická). The street contained several schools throughout its history. Among others, there was an Orthodox grammar school, a Neolog grammar school and a civil school for boys across from the Neolog grammar school.

Zochova Street was also the residence of the Pressburg riding club. Together with the street's name (Turnergasse), it was a reminder of the town's hastilude tradition.

== Today ==
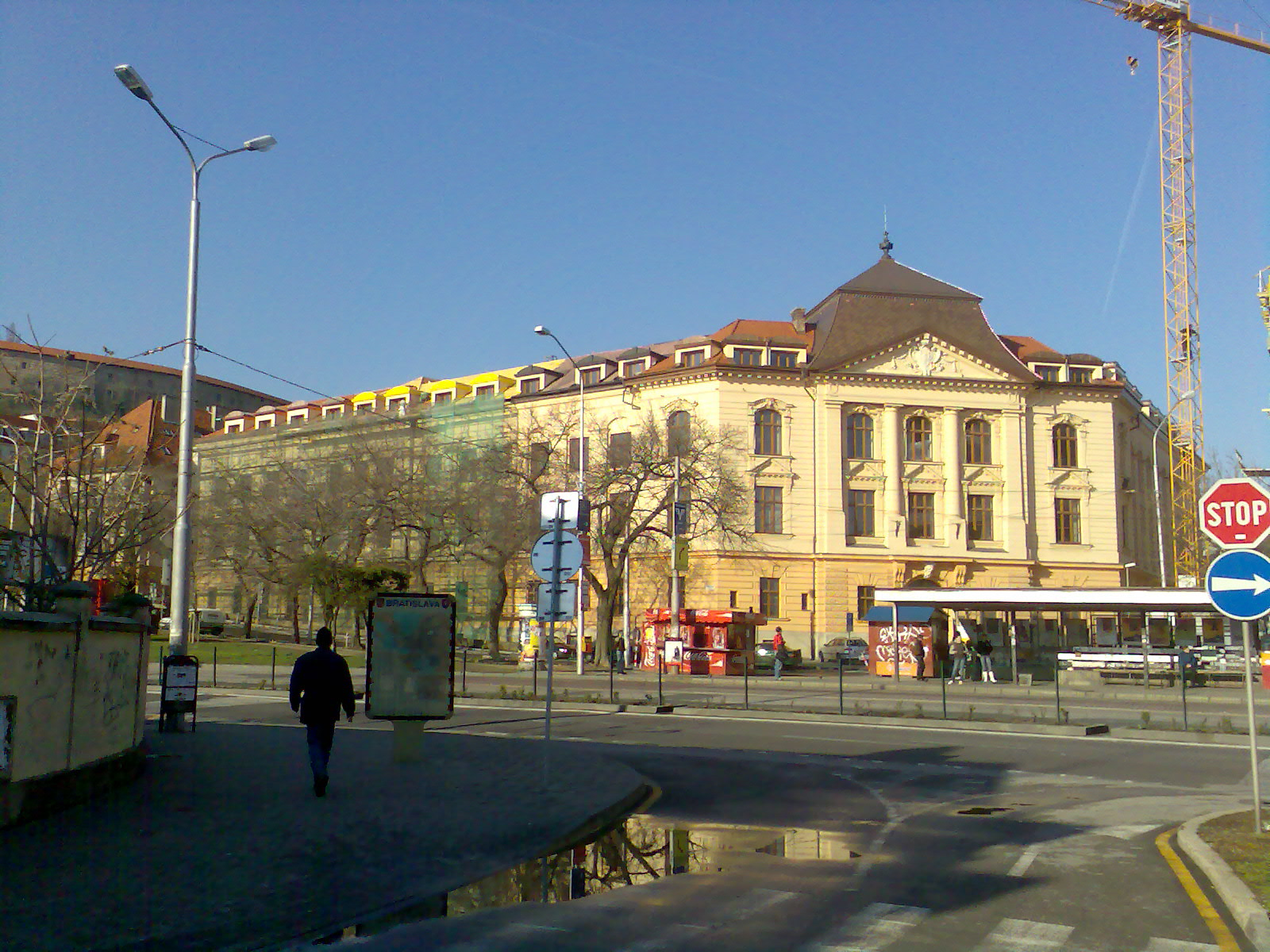
Building of Musical Arts University at Zochova street, formerly home to Slovak Radio

Zochova Street No. 1 is home to the building of the Faculty of Music and Dance of the Academy of Performing Arts in Bratislava. It contains the Concert hall Dvorana, a place of public performances of classical music. Zochova Street is also the location of the fitness center FitRelax at Zochova Street No. 6/8 and (mostly) law firms at Zochova Street No. 5. The street is mostly residential.

== Zochova bus stop ==
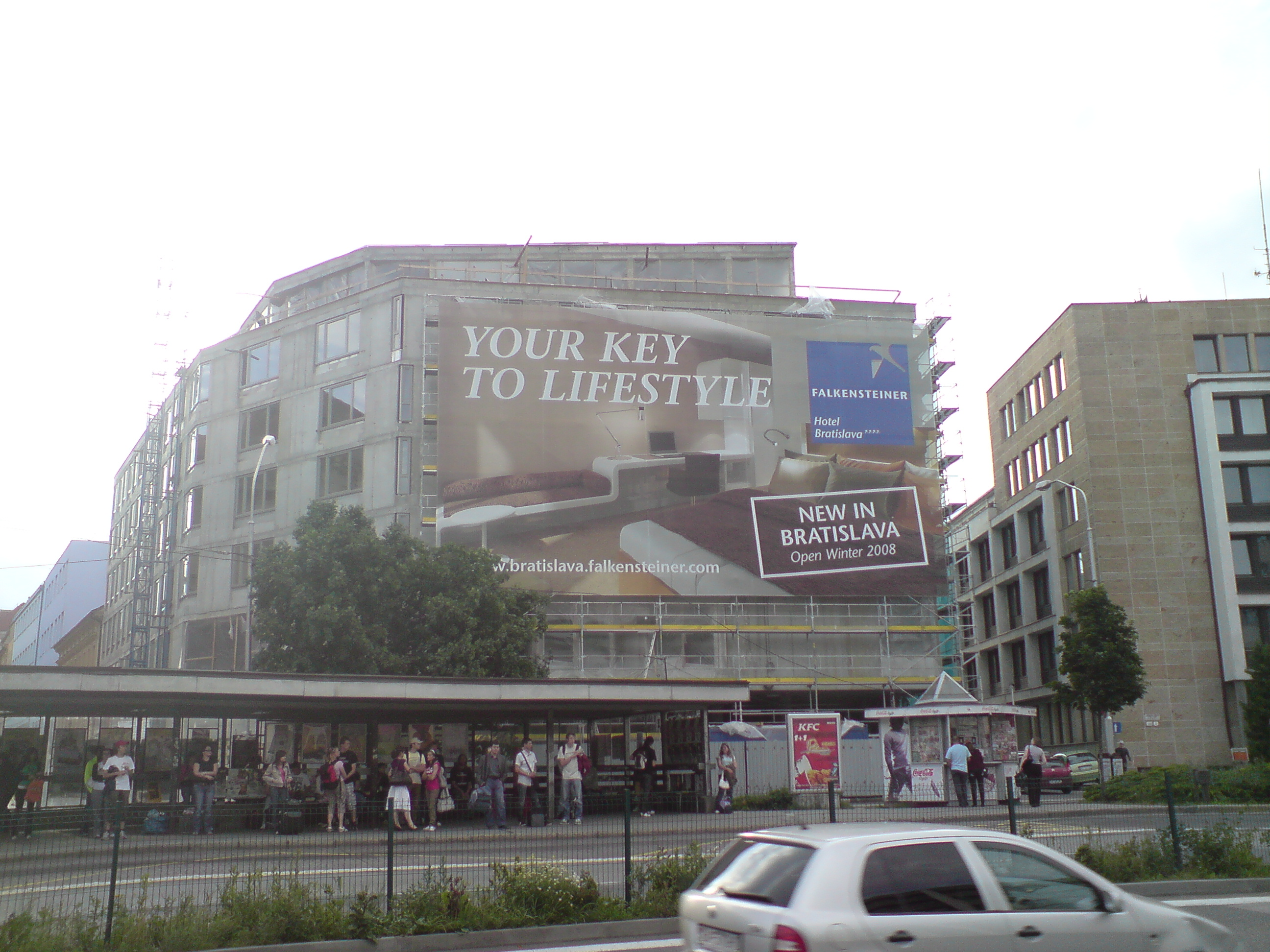
People waiting for their buses at Zochova bus stop

Zochova is also the name of one of the busiest public transport bus stops in Bratislava. The following buses stop here: no. 31, no. 39, no. 80, no. 83, no. 84, no. 93, no. 94 and no. 184. Night buses no. N31, no. N34, no. N80, no. N93 and no. N95 also stop here. The minibus line no. 147 stops at a separate nearby bus stop also named Zochova. Both the buses headed for the Petržalka district and those headed for Slávičie údolie – where the majority of Bratislava's campuses are located – can get crowded around this bus stop not only during peak hours, but also at night.

The following bus stop (in the direction towards Nový Most) is Aupark or Chatam Sófer. The preceding bus stop (in the direction of Hodžovo námestie) is Hodžovo nám. or Nám. 1. mája or Kollárovo nám.

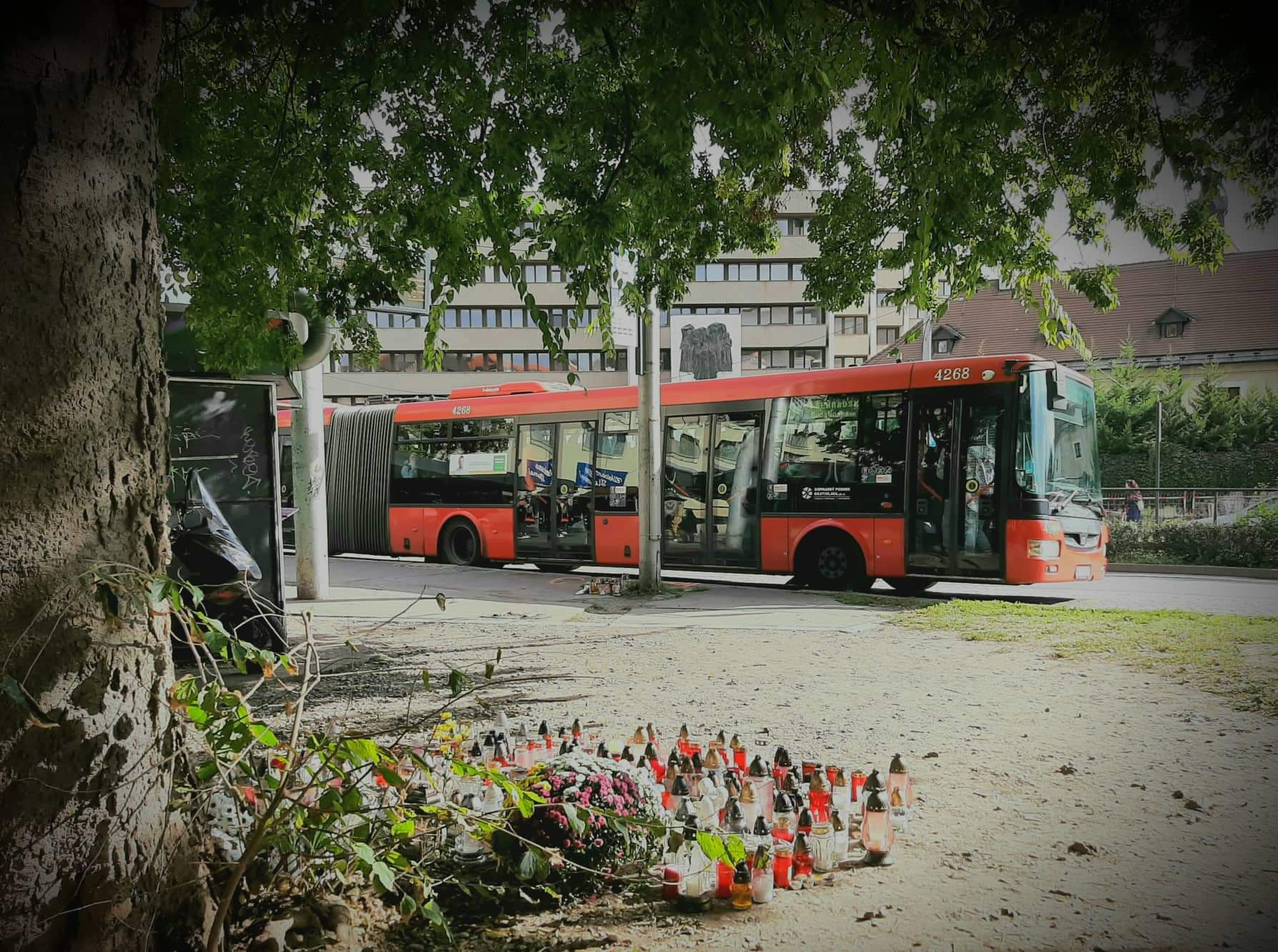
Memorials for the October 2022 car crash victims at the Zochova bus stop

On 2 October 2022 five people died and another six were injured when a car driven by a drunk driver crashed into the bus stop in high speed. Students taking the bus for the Slávičie údolie campus were among the victims. In response to the tragedy, government politicians promised to crack down on drunk driving in Slovakia.

== Protected cultural monuments ==
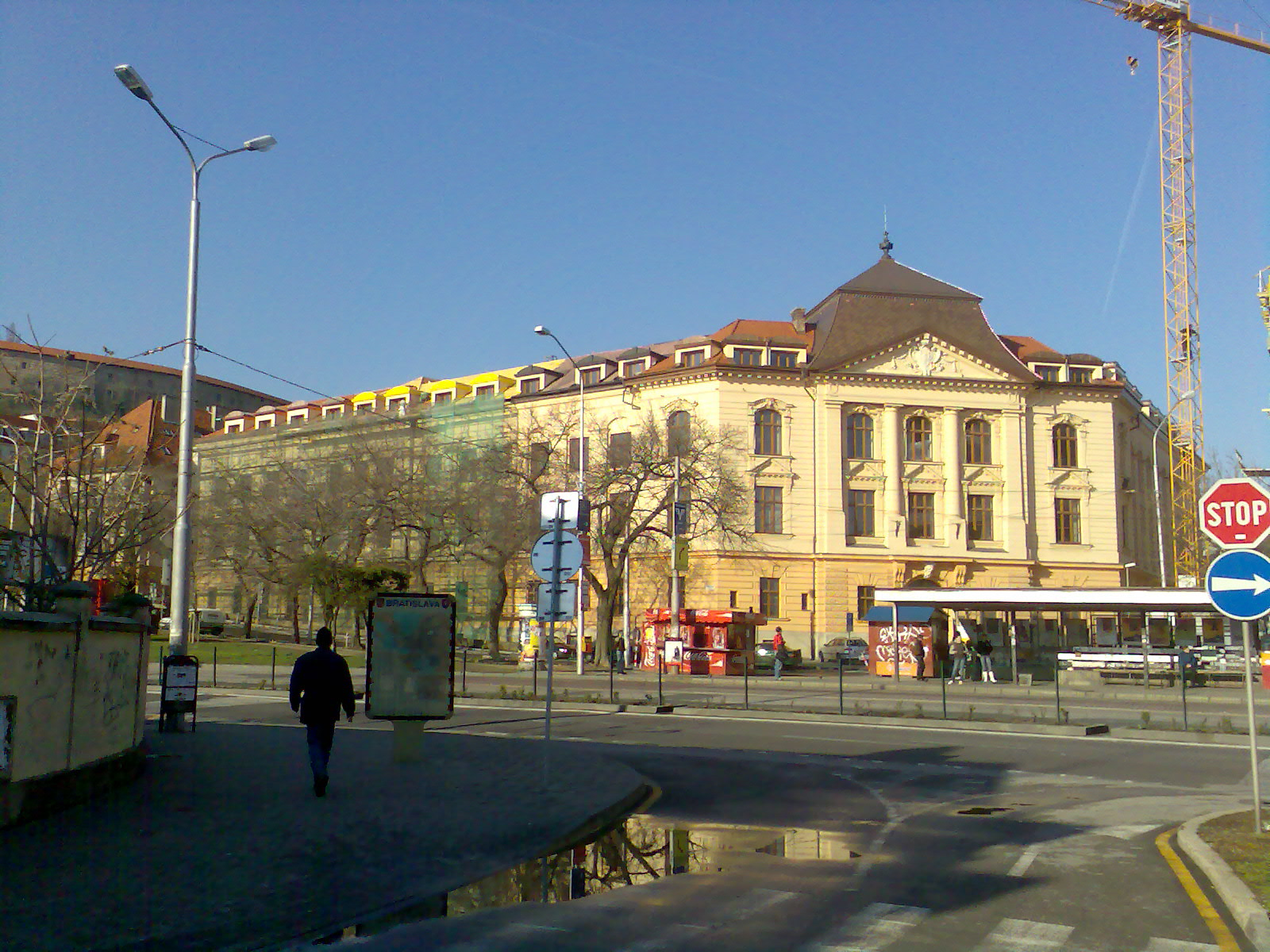
Academy of Performing Arts in Bratislava building of the Faculty of Music and Dance at Zochova Street No. 1.

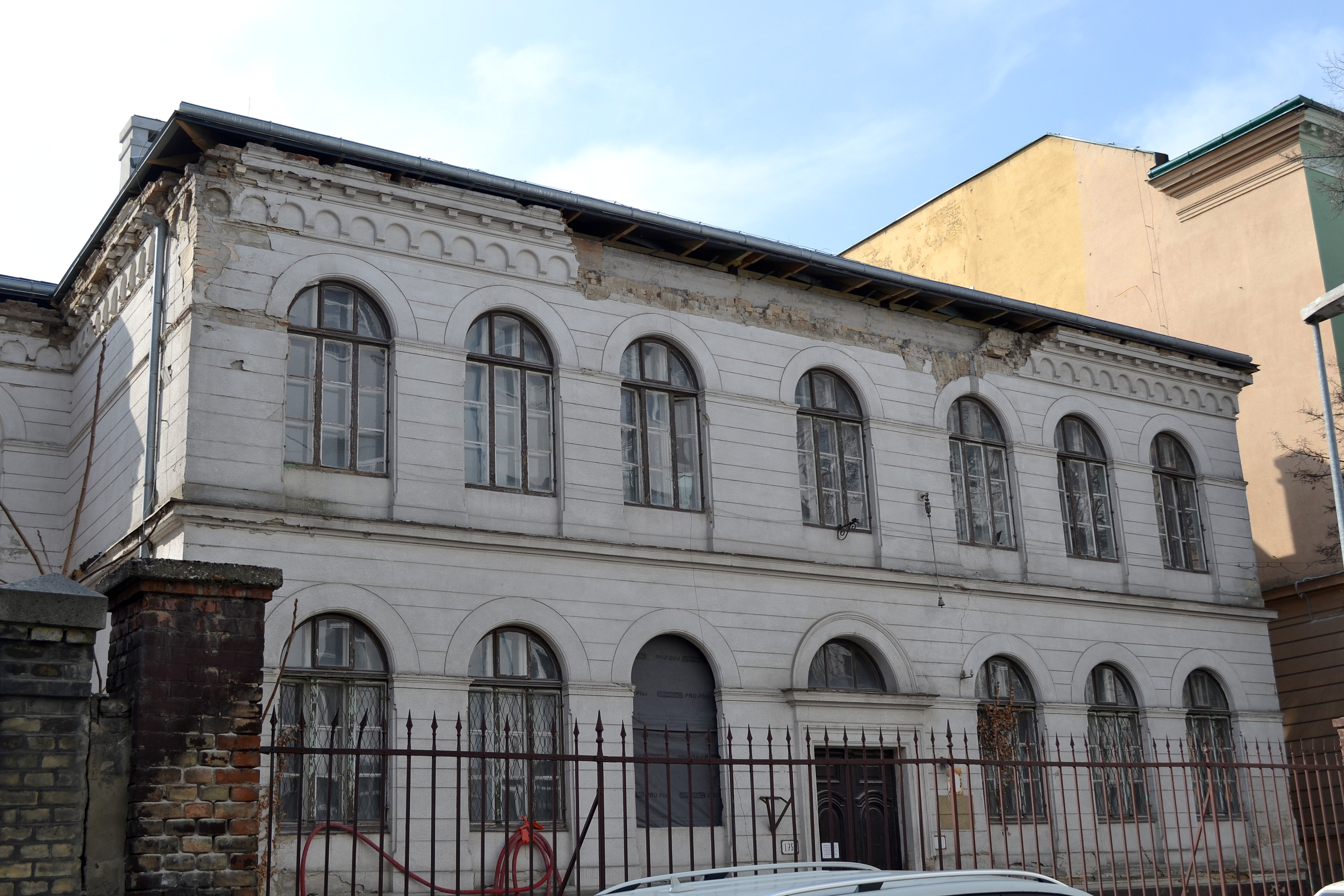
Former school building at Zochova Street No. 3.

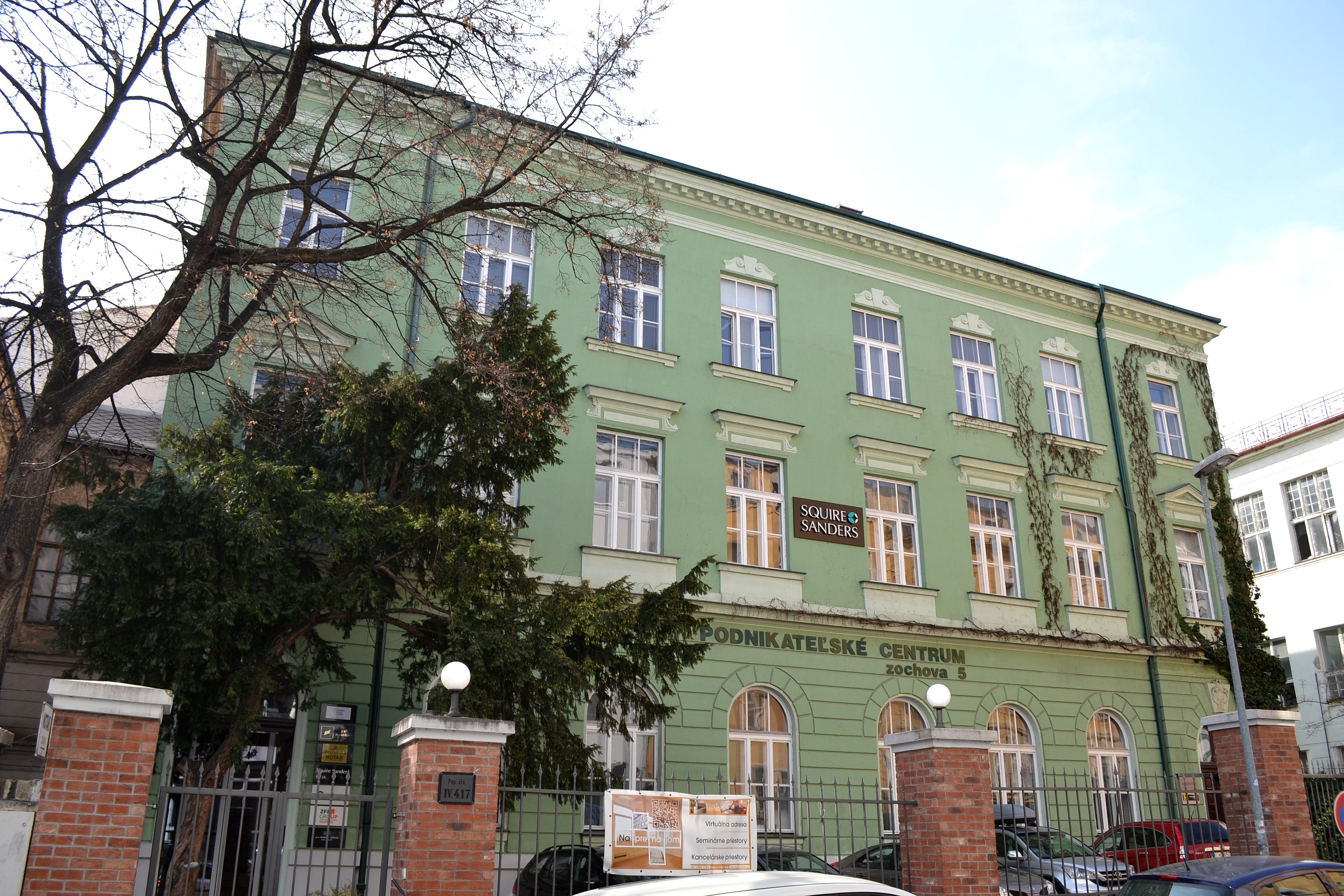
Former school building at Zochova Street No. 5.

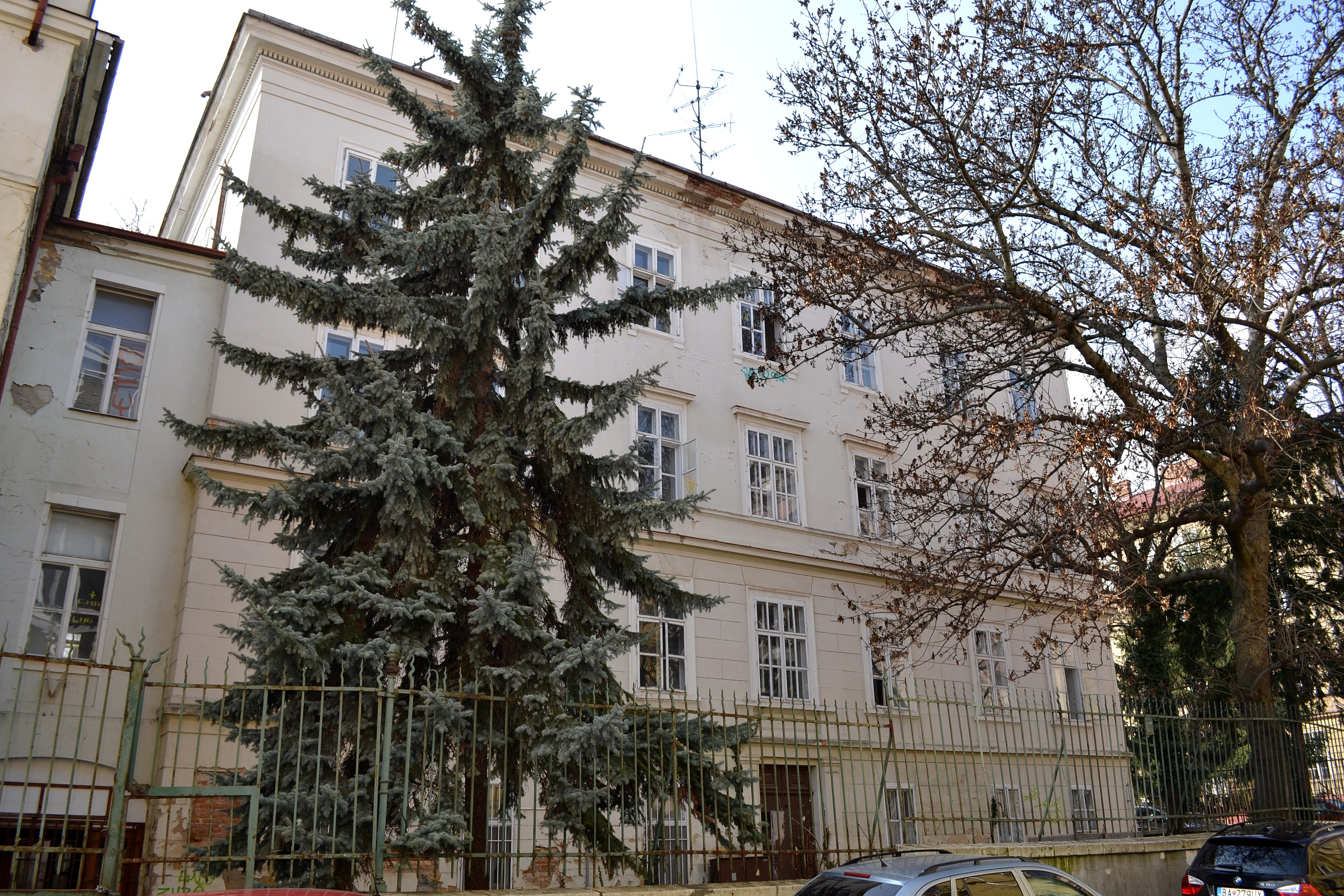
Former hospital building at Zochova Street No. 7.

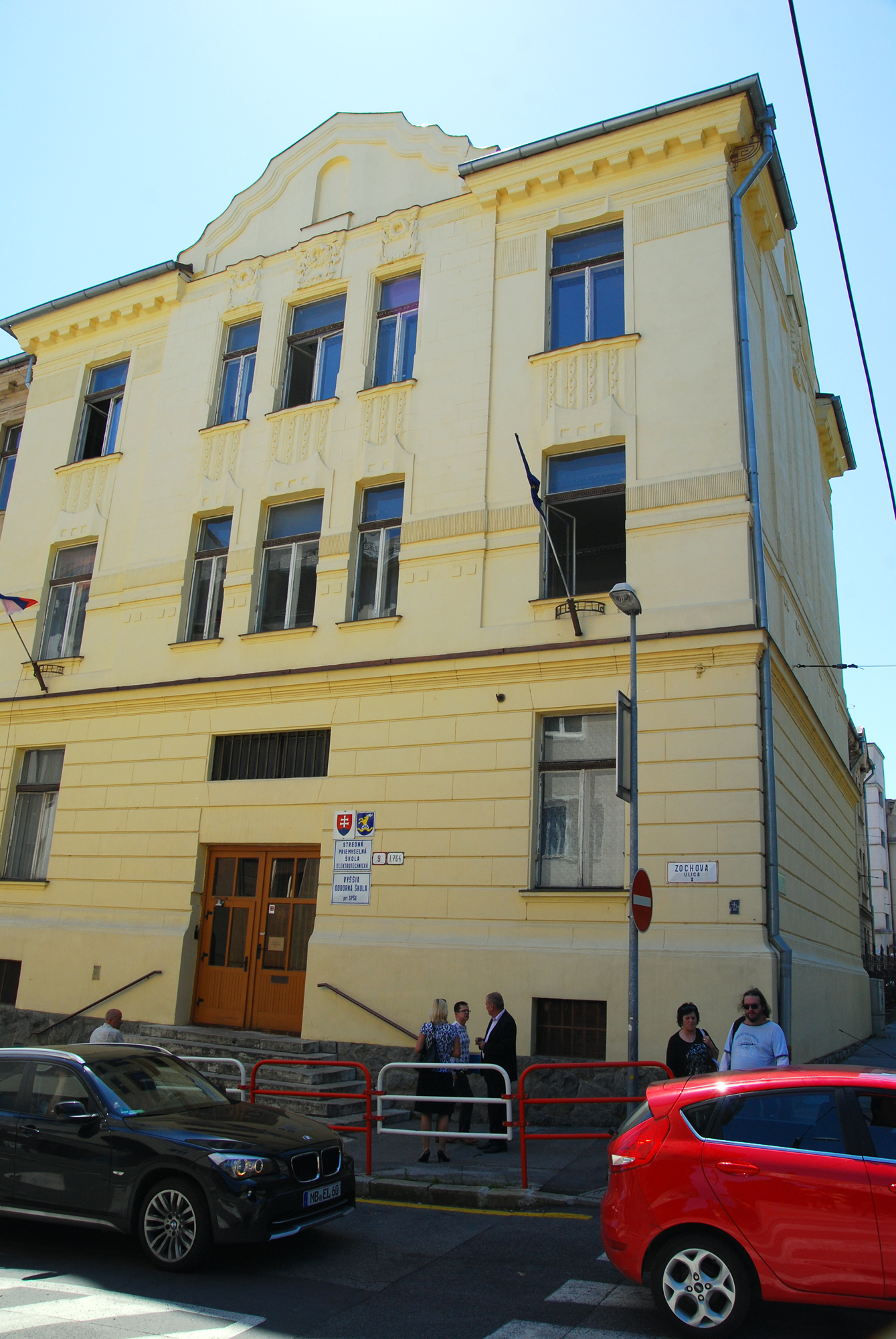
Electrotechnical highschool building at Zochova Street No. 9.

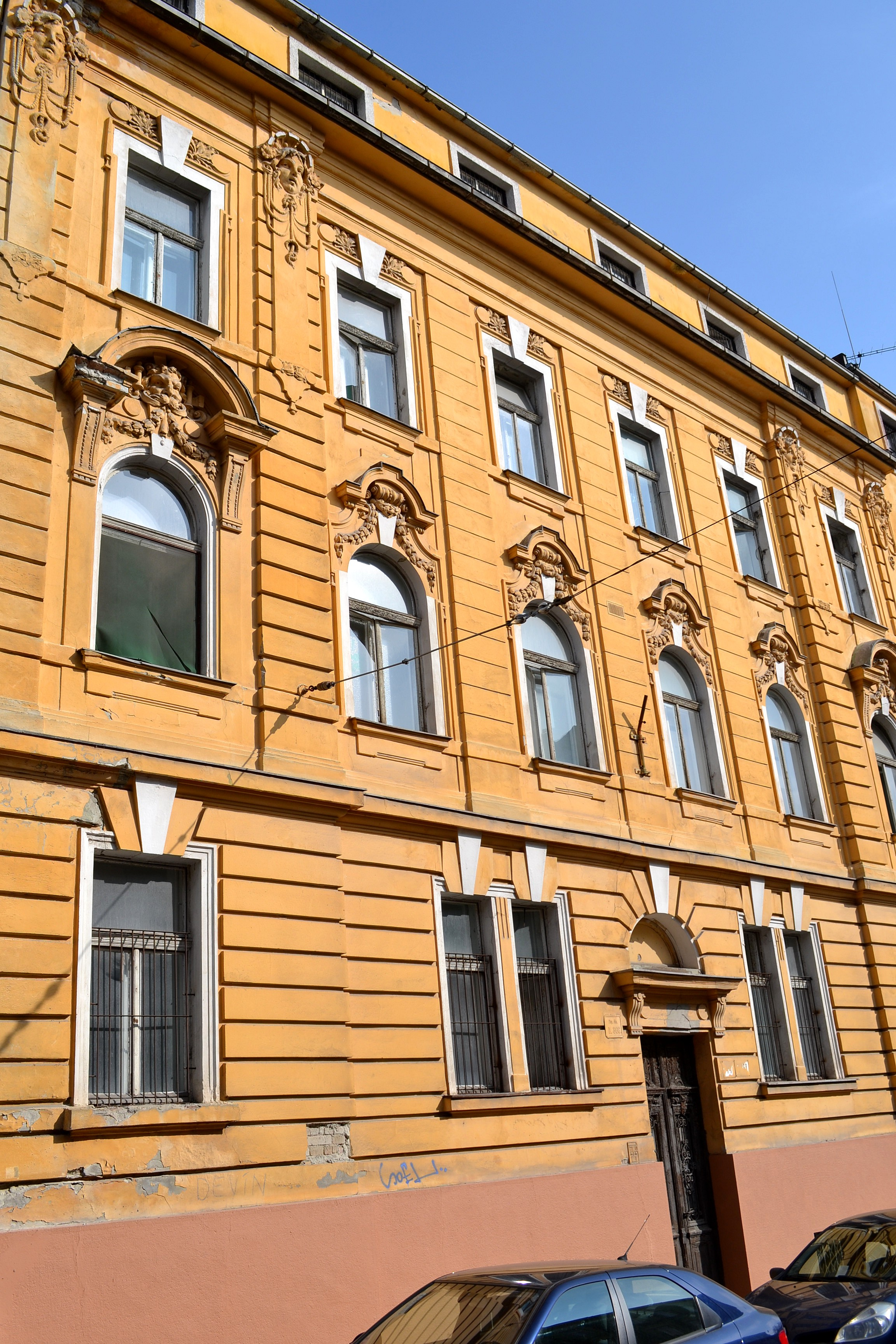
Rent house at Zochova Street No. 14.
