= Pál Pálffy =

Hungarian noble and Palatine of Hungary

Count Pál Pálffy
- Palatine of Hungary (from 1649)
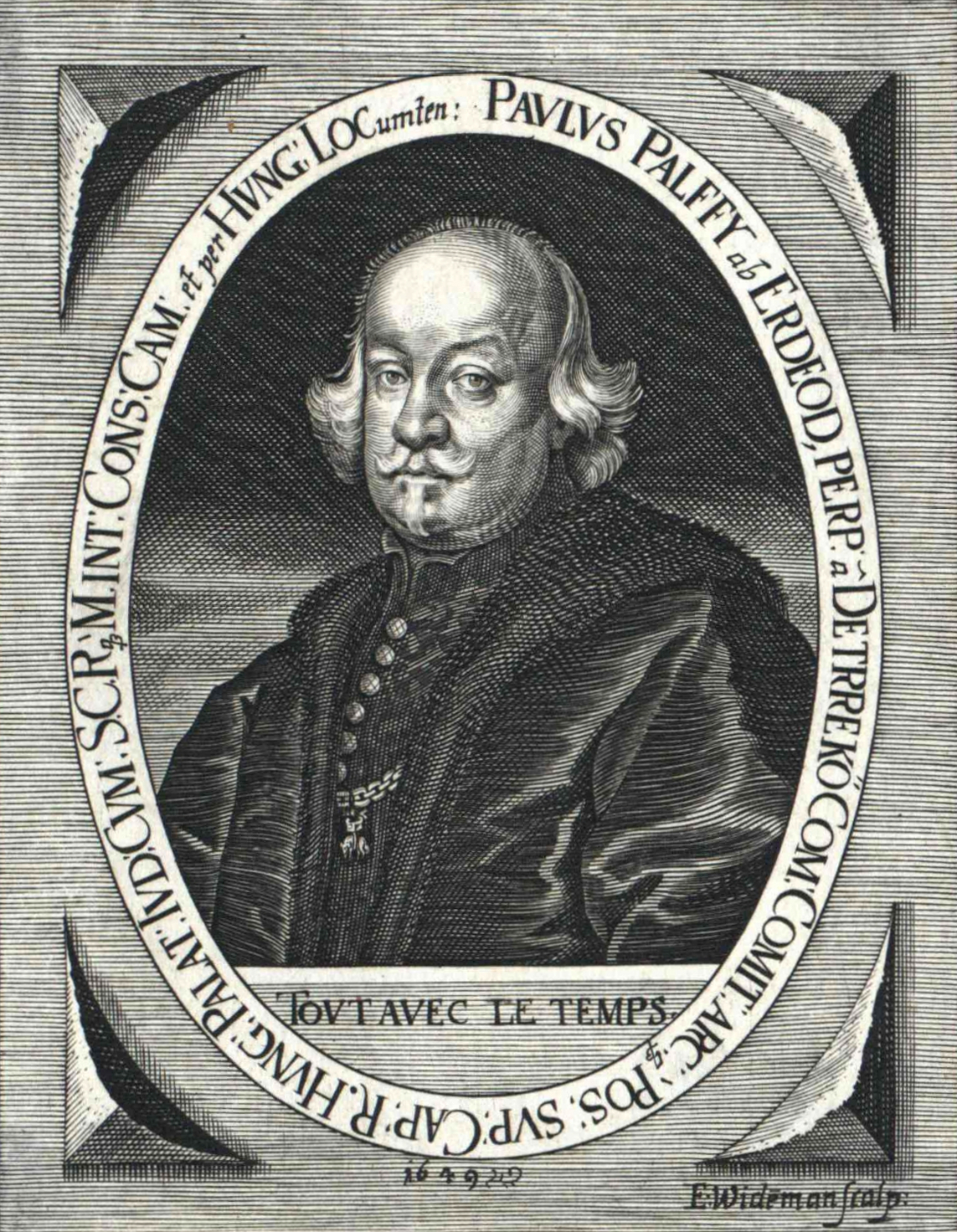
- Pál Pálffy ab Erdőd (1649)
- Other titles: First perpetual Count of Pozsony County; Judge royal (1646–1649); Captain of Royal Castle, Pressburg; Chamberlain; Geheimrat
- Born: 19 January 1592; Castle of Vöröskő, Kingdom of Hungary
- Died: 26 November 1653 (aged 61); Pressburg, Kingdom of Hungary
- Spouse: Franziska Khuen von Belasi (m. 1629)

Pál Pálffy ab Erdőd (Hungarian: erdődi Pálffy Pál, German: Paul Pálffy von Erdöd; 19 January 1592 Castle of Vöröskő, Kingdom of Hungary – 26 November 1653 Pressburg, Kingdom of Hungary) was a Hungarian noble and Palatine of Hungary.

== Life ==
Pál Pálffy de Erdőd, was the fourth son of Miklós Pálffy ab Erdőd and Maria von Fugger, daughter of Markus Fugger from the wealthy Fugger family.

He was Geheimrat, Chamberlain, the first Perpetual count of Pozsony County and Captain of the Royal Castle (in Pressburg, today Bratislava, Slovakia). Between 1646 and 1649 he was Judge royal under Emperor Ferdinand III. In 1649, he became Palatine of Hungary and in 1650 Knight in the Order of the Golden Fleece.

He married on 26 July 1629 with Franziska Khuen von Belasi (died 1672) and had three children:

- János III Antal (1642–1694), Perpetual count of Pozsony County
- János IV Károly (1645–1694), Fieldmarshal in Milano
- Mária Magdolna (died 1684), married August von Zinzendorf and Fernando degli Obizzi, no issue.

Pál Pálffy House of Pálffy Born: 1592 Died: 26 November 1653
Political offices
Preceded by Kristóf Bánffy	Master of the cupbearers 1625–1641	Succeeded by Ádám Forgách
Preceded by Imre Czobor	Master of the household 1641–1646	Succeeded by Ferenc Nádasdy
Preceded by János Drugeth	Judge royal 1646–1649	Succeeded by László Csáky
Preceded by Ivan Drašković	Palatine of Hungary; 1649–1653	Succeeded by Ferenc Wesselényi
