= August Horislav Škultéty =

Slovak writer

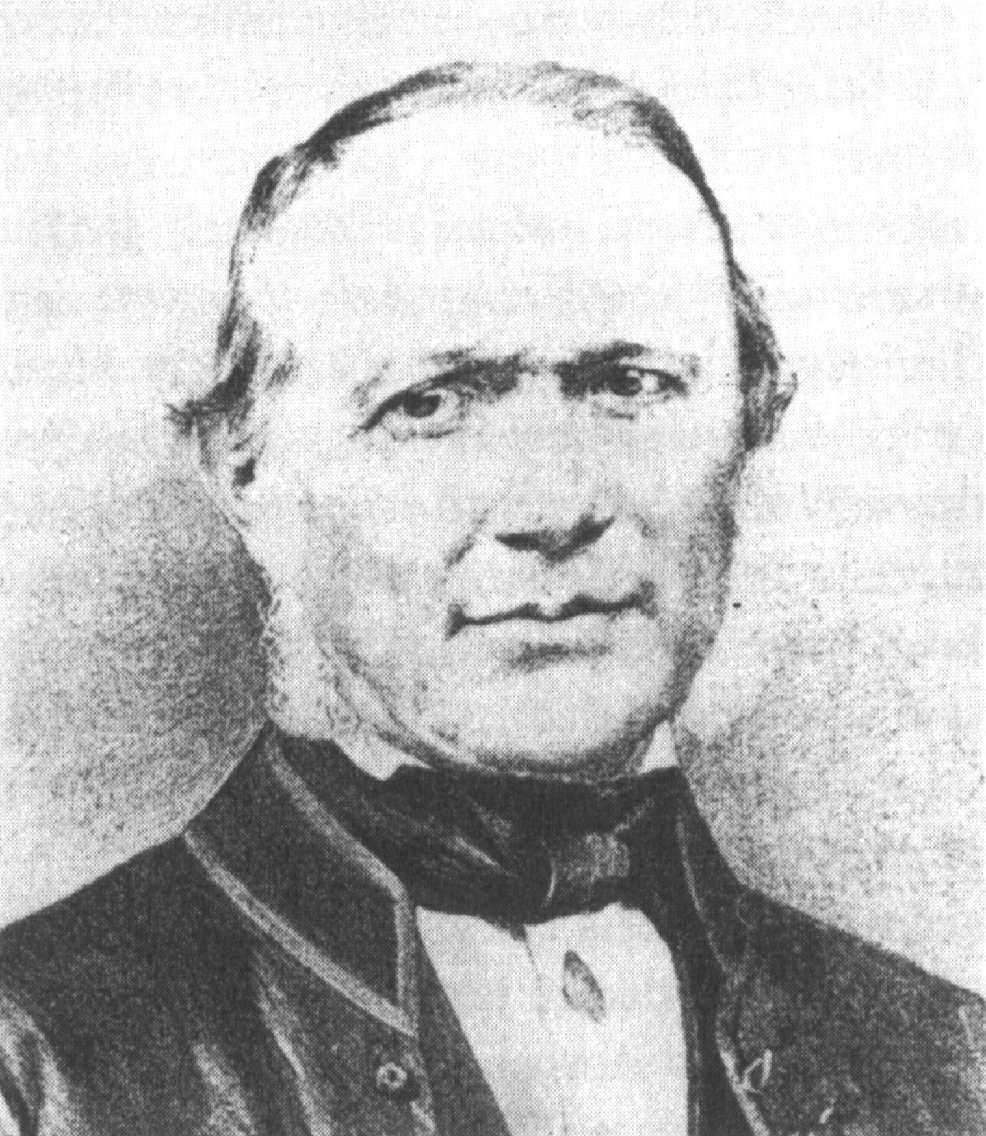
August Horislav Škultéty

August Horislav Škultéty (Hungarian: Skultéty Ágost Horislaw; August 7, 1819 – May 29, 1892) was a Slovak writer, pedagogue, and ethnographer, and the director of the first Slovak high school in Revúca.

== Early years and career ==
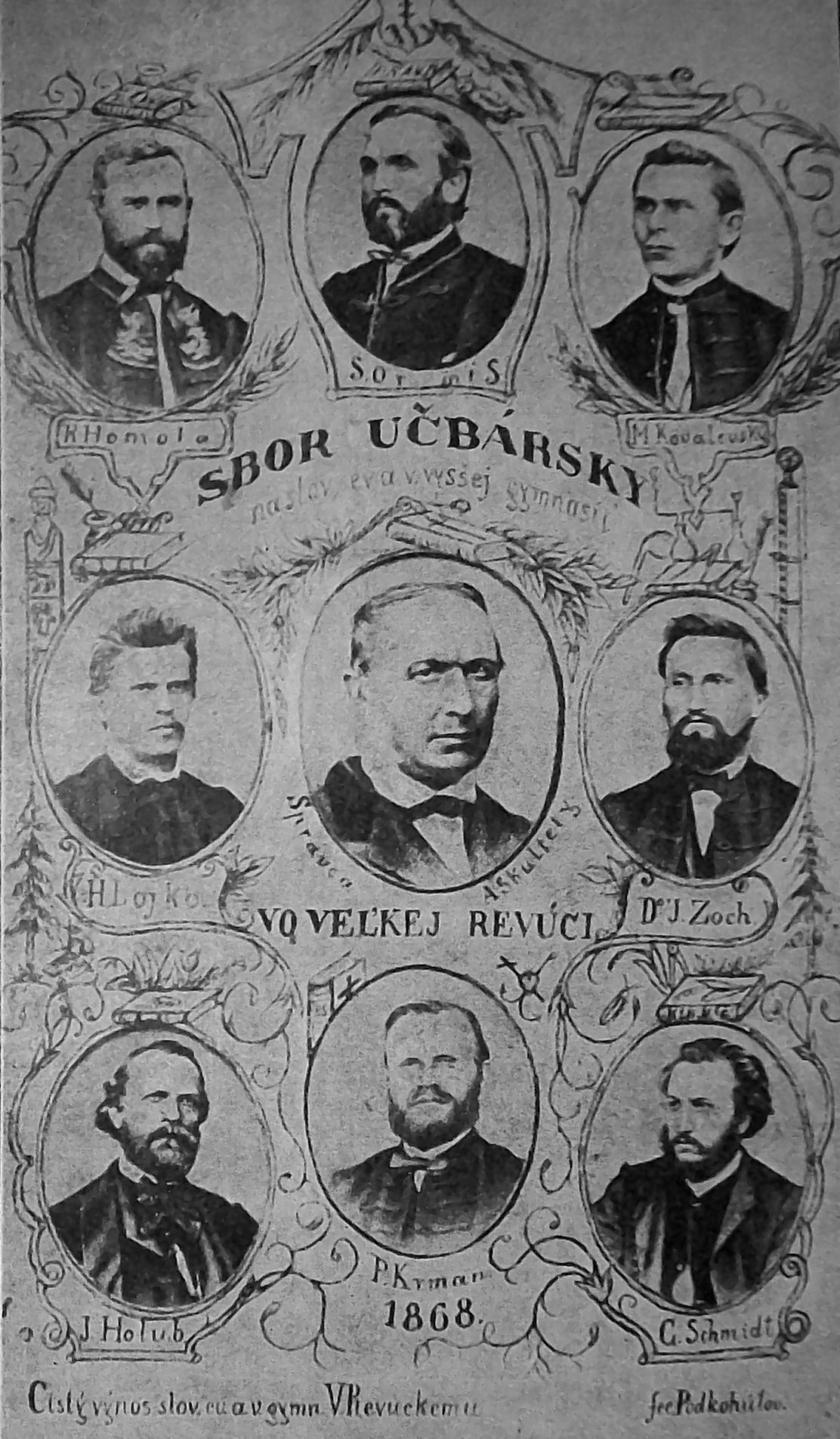
Teaching staff at the Slovak Lutheran high school in Revúca, 1868

August Horislav Škultéty was born in Veľký Krtíš and attended basic school in Tisovec. From 1833 to 1836 he attended lower secondary school at the Lutheran Lyceum in Banská Štiavnica and graduated from the Lutheran high school in Kežmarok. During 1836–1839, he studied theology at the Lutheran Seminary in Bratislava. Beginning in 1839 he was assistant of the professor Juraj Palkovič at the Department of Czech and Slovak Speech and Literature, Lutheran Seminary in Bratislava. He was a chaplain of Tisovec in the years 1841–1848, under Pavol Jozeffy's superintendency. From 1847/48 to 1850 he served as a priest in Dlhá Ves and from 1850 to 1861 in Rozložná. He moved to the first Slovak-language high school, which was created in Revúca, where he worked from 1862 to 1874. From 1875 to 1891 he was a priest in Kraskovo, where he died in 1892.

During his stay in Bratislava, he actively promoted the use of Slovak in secondary schools as well as Protestant universities. Škultéty played an important role in the development of the Department of Czech and Slovak at the Lutheran Seminary. During his stay in Tisovec he belonged to the founders of a public reading circle and a church library. In 1847 the Lutheran Seminary in Bratislava had been closed by Hungarian authorities. In the revolutionary years of 1848–1849, he was arrested and examined by Hungarian authorities at court in Plešivec because of his literal and political struggle for the development of the national life of Slovaks. He became a member of the committee for the establishment of the first Slovak high school in Revúca, opened on September 16, 1862. He worked there as a professor of religion, and later as director. Under his guidance, the institute became an important center of Slovak education and this fact caused permanent attacks of Magyarisation school policy, which peaked in 1874, when the school was closed by the Hungarian authorities.

== Literary works ==
His literary work significantly developed Slovak literature, education and pedagogy, particularly for children and youth. In 1840, he published his collection of poetry, named Básne, as the first person from the Štúr generation.

Zábavník pre dietky was the first original literary work for children written in Slovak. Then in 1850 and 1855 Škultéty's two text books Rečňovanka pre Slovenskje školi were issued, which affected the patriotic, linguistic and aesthetic education in Slovak schools. He collected and transcribed Slovak folk fairy tales together with Štefan Marko Daxner and Čipka, and these were preserved in the Codex Tisovský, one of the main sources of Škultéty and Dobšinský's Slovenské povesti (Slovak Tales, 1858–1861).

Altogether he is an author of 14 textbooks, but the vast majority of them remained in manuscript form.

== Legacy ==
Libraries in Veľký Krtíš and in Tisovec are named after him. August Horislav Škultéty High School in Veľký Krtíš was also named in his honor.
