= Pavol Dobšinský =

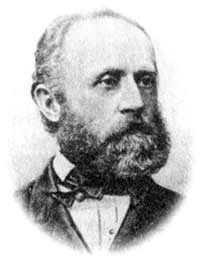
- Born: 16 March 1828; Slavošovce, Upper Hungary
- Died: 22 October 1885 (aged 57); Drienčany, Austria-Hungary
- Writing career
- Notable work: Simple National Slovak Tales

Pavol Dobšinský (16 March 1828 – 22 October 1885) was a Slovak collector of folklore tales and a key figure in the Slovak national revival. An important figure of the Romantic literature in Slovakia and the 19th century Slovak literature, Dobšinský is notable for creating the largest and most complete collection of Slovak folktales, Prostonárodné slovenské povesti (Simple National Slovak Tales), self-published in a series of eight books from 1880 to 1883.

== Biography ==
Pavol Dobšinský was born on 16 March 1828 in Slavošovce in Rožňava District. His father was a Lutheran minister. He was educated at the grammar schools in Rožňava and Miskolc and later studied at the evangelical lycée in Levoča. He fought with Honvéds and later Imperial Army in the Hungarian Revolution of 1848. After being discharged from the army, he became an assistant to Samuel Reuss, a Lutheran pastor in Revúca. Reuss was a passionate collector of folk tales and passed this interest to Dobšinský. After a stint teaching Slovak language in Banská Štiavnica, Dobšinský eventually settled in the village of Drienčany in Rimavská Sobota District, where he worked as a Lutheran minister.

== Works ==
The focus of most of his work was on folklore. He first published a collection of Slovak tales in Slovenské povesti (Slovak Tales) from 1858 to 1861 in 6 volumes, with a total of 64 stories. He followed this up with Prostonárodnie obyčaje, povery a hry slovenské (Simple National Slovak Customs, Superstitions, and Plays) in 1880, just five years before his death. In that same year, he also started publishing a series of volumes at his own expense of a more complete and larger collection of Slovak folktales, Prostonárodnie slovenské povesti (Simple National Slovak Tales). He would continue publishing more volumes of this work until 1883, bringing the total up to 90 stories in 8 volumes. As most of the folk and fairy tales were originally intended for an adult audience, Dobšinský opted to edit out much brutality, eroticism and juicy humor, thus making them suitable for children and simultaneously helping them to be more popular.

In spite of the liberties Dobšinský took with the folk tales, his works are considered by academics to be an essential source of Slovak folklore. They have been rewritten a number of times, too, and they have also been published in more than twenty-one countries.

== Death ==
Dobšinský died on 22 October 1885 from pneumonia.

== Works online ==
- DOBŠINSKÝ, P., ŠKULTÉTY, A. H. Slovenské povesti Kniha 1. Povesti prastarých báječných časov. Rožňava: [s.n.], 1858. 401 p. – available at ULB's Digital Library
