= Lędziny =

Lędziny Lyńdźiny
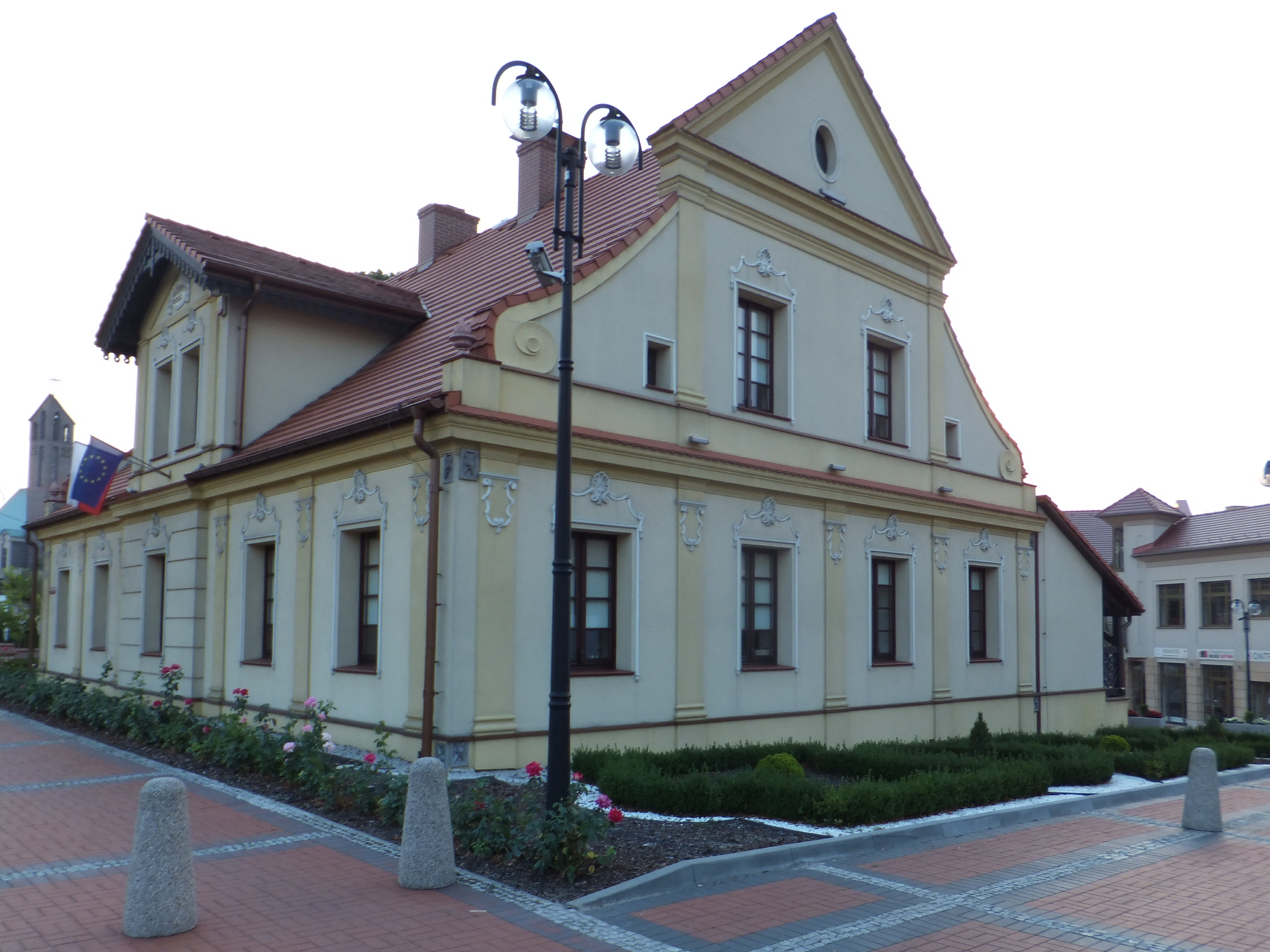
- Library in the town centre

- Coat of arms

- Location within Poland
- Coordinates: 50°7′37″N 19°6′44″E
- Country: Poland
- Voivodeship: Silesian
- County: Bieruń-Lędziny
- Gmina: Lędziny (urban gmina)

Area
  - City: 31.48 km^{2} (12.15 sq mi)

Population (2019-06-30)
  - City: 16,776
  - Density: 532.9/km^{2} (1,380/sq mi)
  - Urban: 2,746,000
  - Metro: 5,294,000
- Time zone: UTC+1 (CET)
  - Summer (DST): UTC+2 (CEST)
- Vehicle registration: SBL
- Primary airport: Katowice Airport
- Website: http://www.ledziny.pl

Lędziny ([lɛnˈd͡ʑinɨ]; German: Lendzin; Silesian: Lyńdźiny) is a town in Silesia in southern Poland, near Katowice. Outer town of the Metropolis GZM – a metropolis with a population of 2 million which is located in the Silesian Highlands. The population of the town is 16,776 (2019).

It is situated in the Silesian Voivodeship since its formation in 1999, previously in Katowice Voivodeship, and before then, of the Autonomous Silesian Voivodeship. Lędziny is one of the towns of the 2.7 million conurbation – Katowice urban area and within a greater Katowice-Ostrava metropolitan area populated by about 5,294,000 people.

== History ==
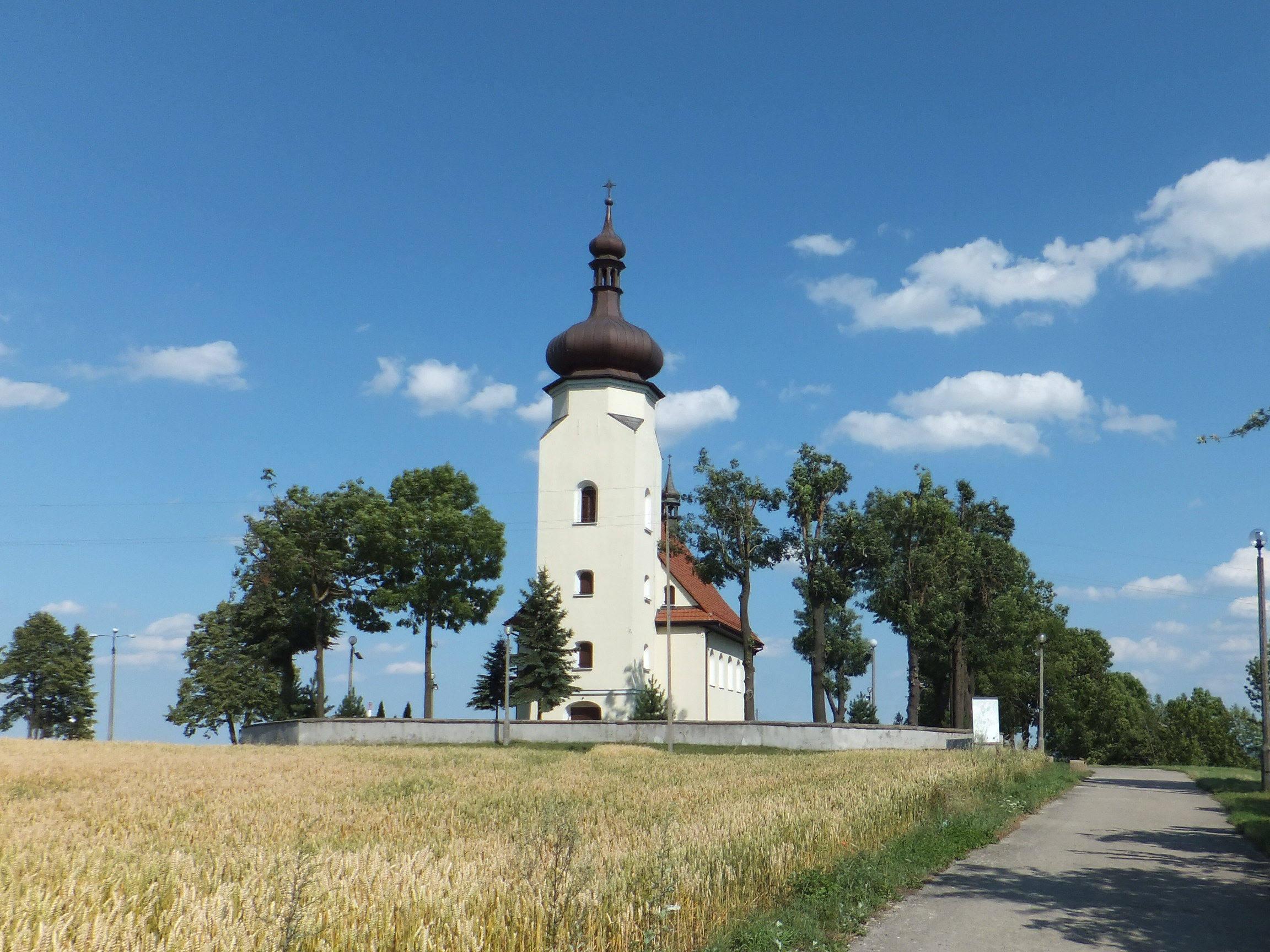
Church of Saint Clement

The proofs of human habitation dating back to the Bronze Age have been found in a direct vicinity of the town – mostly period pieces of Lusatian culture. In the pre-Christian era, on the highest hill within present borders of the town – Klimont Hill, place of worship dedicated to Slavic god Perun, (modern ablatives Piorun, Pieron – meaning Thunderbolt) was located. Much later, in 1769, Saint Clement Church was raised in exactly the same spot, where pagan place of worship used to be.

In 1160, Lędziny was donated by knight Jaksa of Miechów to the Order of Saint Benedict, as it was mentioned by Jan Długosz. In 1260, it was mentioned in a document of Duke Vladislaus I of Opole issued in Racibórz. It was part of medieval Piast-ruled Poland.

In the 18th century, it was annexed by Prussia, and after 1871 it was part of Germany. Battles of the Polish Silesian Uprisings against Germany were fought in the area, especially during the Second Silesian Uprising in 1920. Afterwards Lędziny was restored to the reborn Polish state.

On September 3, 1939, during the German invasion of Poland, which started World War II, German troops committed a massacre of seven Poles in Lędziny, including a 17-year-old boy and a 16-year girl (see Nazi crimes against the Polish nation). The town was afterwards occupied by Germany until 1945. In 1944, the Germans established a subcamp of the Auschwitz concentration camp in the town, in which they imprisoned hundreds of prisoners, mostly Jews from German-occupied France, Netherlands, Poland and Hungary. In January 1945, the Germans evacuated 600 prisoners on foot to the nearby city of Gliwice.

In 1975 Lędziny was amalgamated with Tychy, but regained town rights in 1991.

== Districts ==
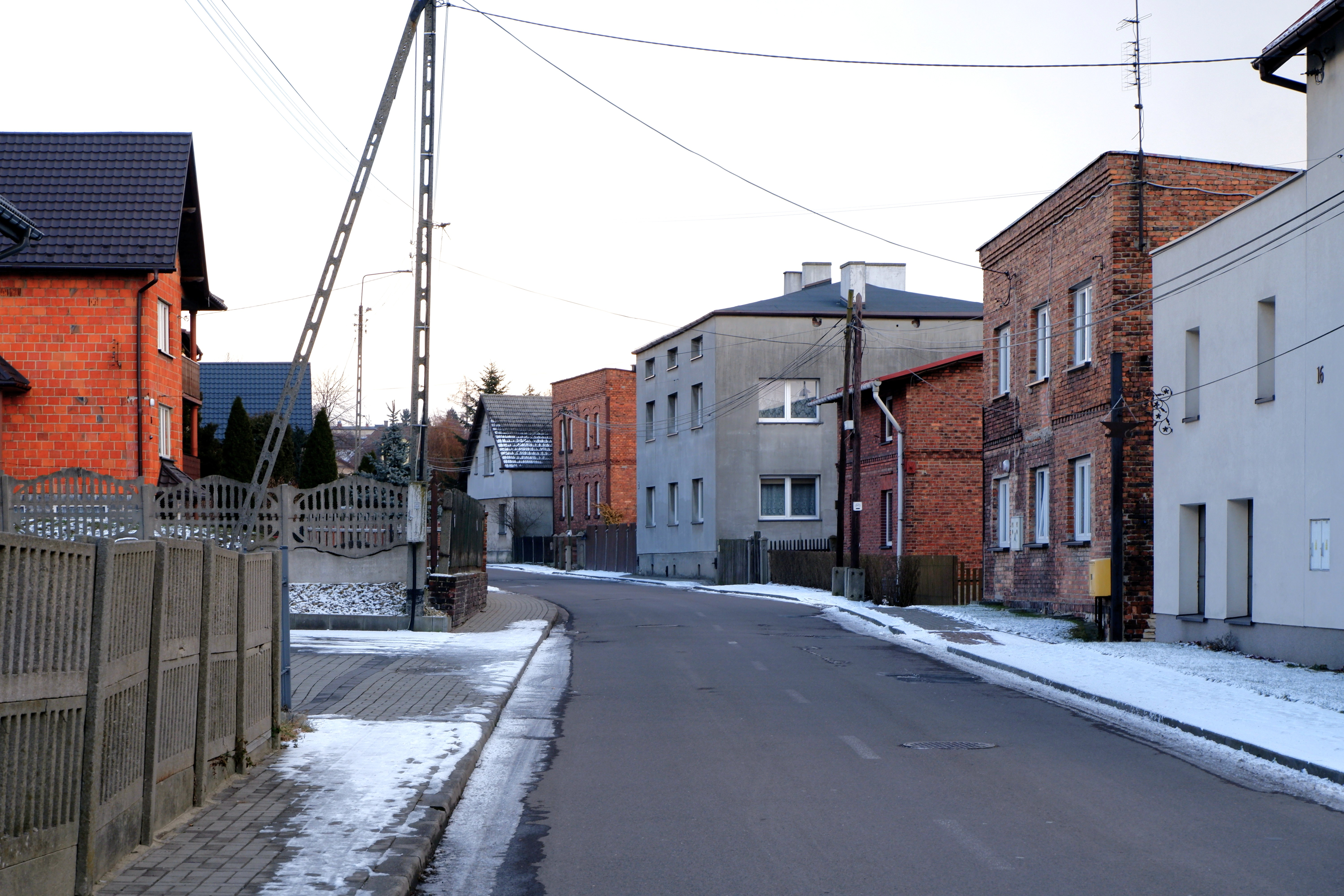
Sobieskiego Street

The town is subdivided into 9 districts:

- Blych
- Goławiec
- Górki
- Hołdunów
- Rachowy
- Ratusz
- Smardzowice
- Świniowy
- Zamoście

== Sports ==
The local football club is MKS Lędziny. It competes in the lower leagues.

== Twin towns – sister cities ==
Lędziny is twinned with:

- Revúca, Slovakia
- Roccagorga, Italy
- Uničov, Czech Republic
