= Samuel Reuss =

Ethnologist (1783–1852)

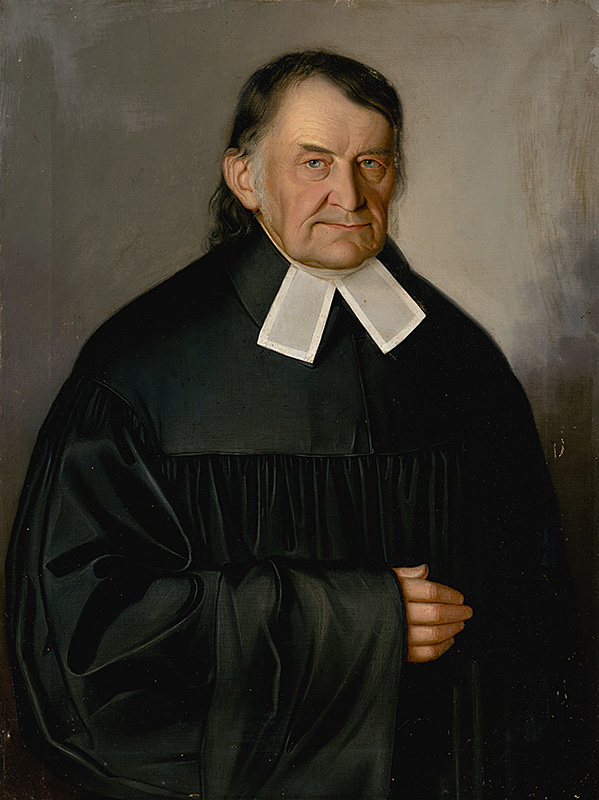
- Born: 8 September 1783; Zólyomlipcse, Kingdom of Hungary
- Died: 2 December 1852 (aged 69); Revúca
- Citizenship: Hungarian
- Occupations: Lutheran pastor, ethnographer
- Spouse: Rozália Schulek (m. 1810)
- Children: Emília Karolina (1811–1817), Karolina Ludovika (1813–1886 k.), Gyula (1816–1872), Gusztáv Márton Sámuel (1818–1861), Lajos (1822–1905), Adolf Titus (1823–1902)

Sámuel Reuss (8 September 1783 – 2 December 1852) was a Lutheran pastor and ethnographer.

== Early life and career ==
Sámuel Reuss was born in Zólyomlipcse. He married Rozália Schulek on 21 November 1810. They had six children, five of whom reached adulthood.

Reuss began his studies in Osgyán, continued in the upper classes at Késmárk, and completed a course in theology at the Lutheran High School in Pozsony between 1802 and 1805. He then continued his studies at the University of Jena on 16 October 1805. Abroad he learned from teachers Johann Jakob Griesbach and Heinrich Karl Eichstädt, Johann Gottfried Herder and Goethe and became the Secretary of the Mineralogical Society and a full member of the Latin Society. On 14 October 1806, he was present on the side of the Prussians in the Battle of Jena. He was elected as the Hungarian member of the Mineralogical Society at Jena in 1806.

Returning from Germany, he was appointed as a replacement teacher in Besztercebánya on 1 November 1806. He was a principal and assistant pastor (chaplain) in Tiszolc from 10 September 1807 to December 1809. From 1 January 1810 he worked as a pastor for three years in Karaszkó. From 19 April 1812 until 1842, he was the Lutheran pastor of Nagyrőce. He climbed the hierarchy of the diocese of Gömör, becoming an archdeacon in 1824, from which position he resigned around 1836.

He was also a public notary for some time, but also worked as an archaeologist. He did research in Kőjankó, which is part of a spectacular natural formation of the Pokorágy Hills in present-day Slovakia. The Bronze Age urn tombs found here, covered with stone slabs, were discovered and researched at the beginning of the 19th century; Reuss excavated further tombs in 1813. In 1822 he founded the Slovak Library in Revúca. As a result of his studies in Jena, he carried out extensive research in the fields of history, archeology, ethnography, Slovak folk tales, mineralogy and ornithology in addition to ecclesiastical topics. His publications were published in Slovak, German and Hungarian.

Together with his three sons, Gusztáv (Gustáv), Adolf, and Lajos (Ludevít), he started a collection of Slovak folk tales, revised them and wrote about the theoretics of the stories. He tried to explain the prehistoric history of the Slovaks with the help of folk tales, and was the first to do so in the territory of present-day Slovakia. At the time of the revolution in 1848 he became a lieutenant. On 14 February 1850, he was appointed administrator of the Tisza district by decree of Haynau by the Royal Imperial Government of Austria, a position he held until his death. When he fell ill, he was cared for by his son, Gusztáv Reuss – who was invited to Nagyrőce in 1851 as a city doctor. He died in Revúca in 1852.

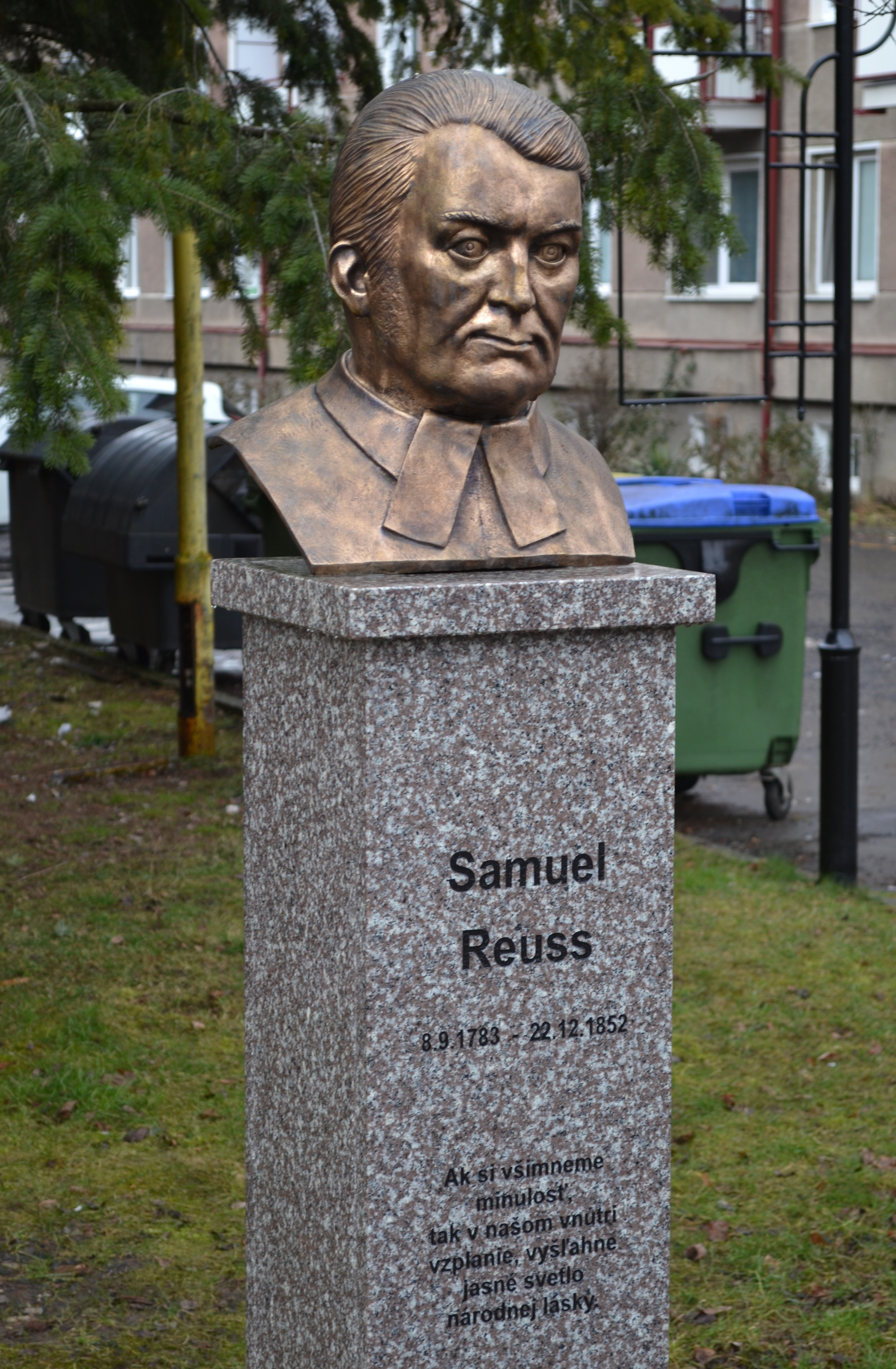
Bronze bust of Samuel Reuss. Created by Anna Kisaková in 2018. Rimavská Sobota, Daxner Square Memorial Park, established in 2006

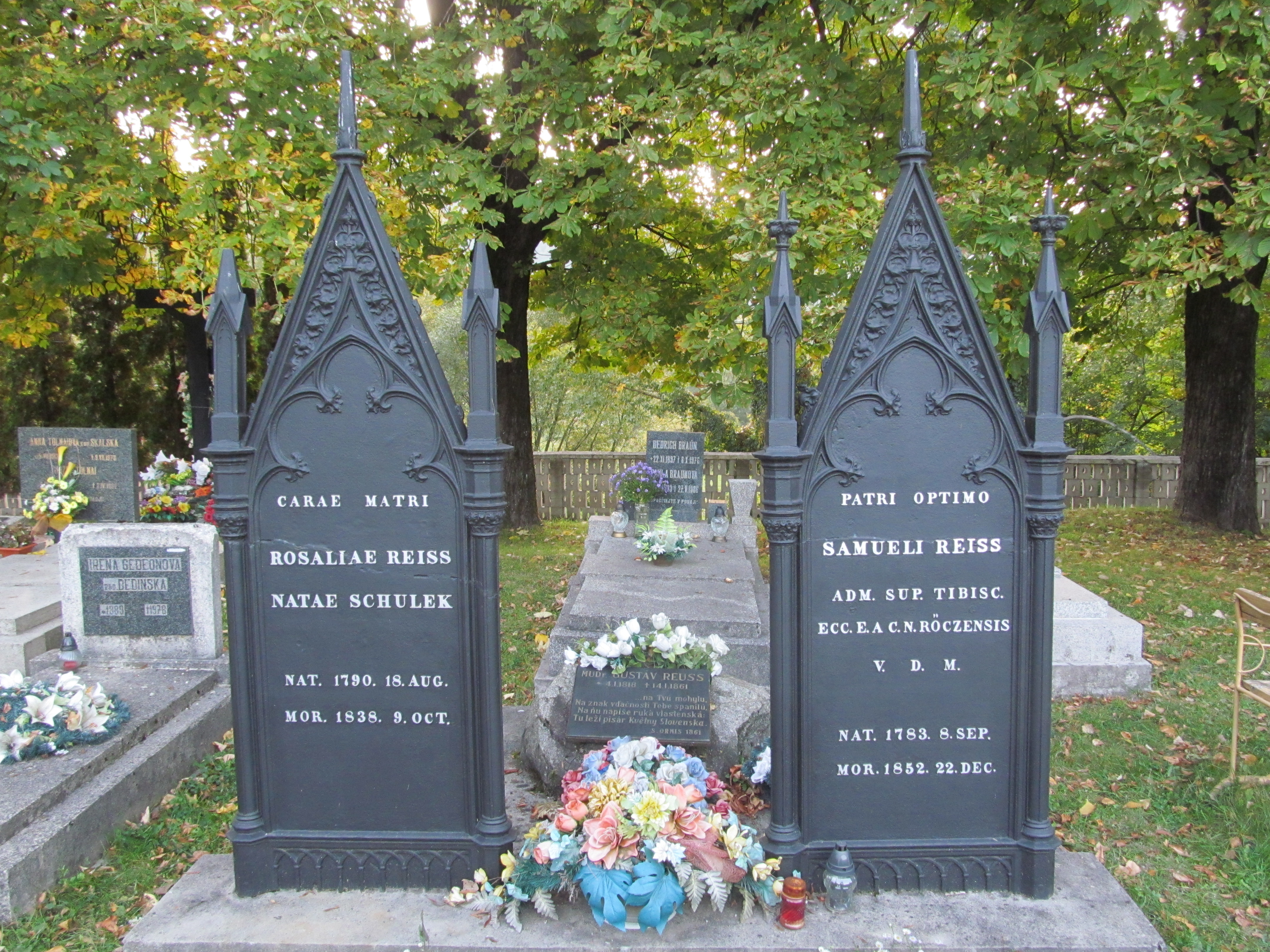
Tomb of Samuel Reuss and his wife Rozalia Schulek. Revúca cemetery. The tombstone was declared a national cultural monument.

== Notable works ==
- Ueber die Kirchen-Disciplin bei den Protestanten der praktische Theil fehlt.
- Das Privilegium fori bei den Protestanten in Ungarn (1838)
- Ueber Begräbnisse und Begräbnissörter. Ein Beitrag zum protestantischen Kirchenrechte (1841–1842)

== Sources ==
- Hörk József: Az Ev. Tisza-Kerület püspökei. (superintendensek) Kassa. 1888.
- Abel-Mokos: Magyarországi tanulók a jenai egyetemen. Budapest, 1890. 92. l.
- Béla Sipos: Terray-Reuss-Schulek and related upland family trees. The Terray family. www.terray.hu family history page.
- József Szinnyei: Hungarian writers and their works. Budapest, 1791. Reuss Sámuel.
- Opinion on the works of Sámuel Reuss: Robert Hammel’s study examines Reuss’s citations in terms of their critical edition and distinguishes three categories: 1.the sources are listed correctly; 2. the references to the sources are incorrect and are therefore corrected: 3. a free revision of the original text, which aims at clarity. The article discusses the possibilities of identifying the sources cited by Reuss and suggests possible solutions to the citations in the critical edition.
- The ancestors of Samuel Reuss: hu:Reuss család (felvidéki)
