= Hołdunów =

Coordinates: 50.147756°N 19.136939°E

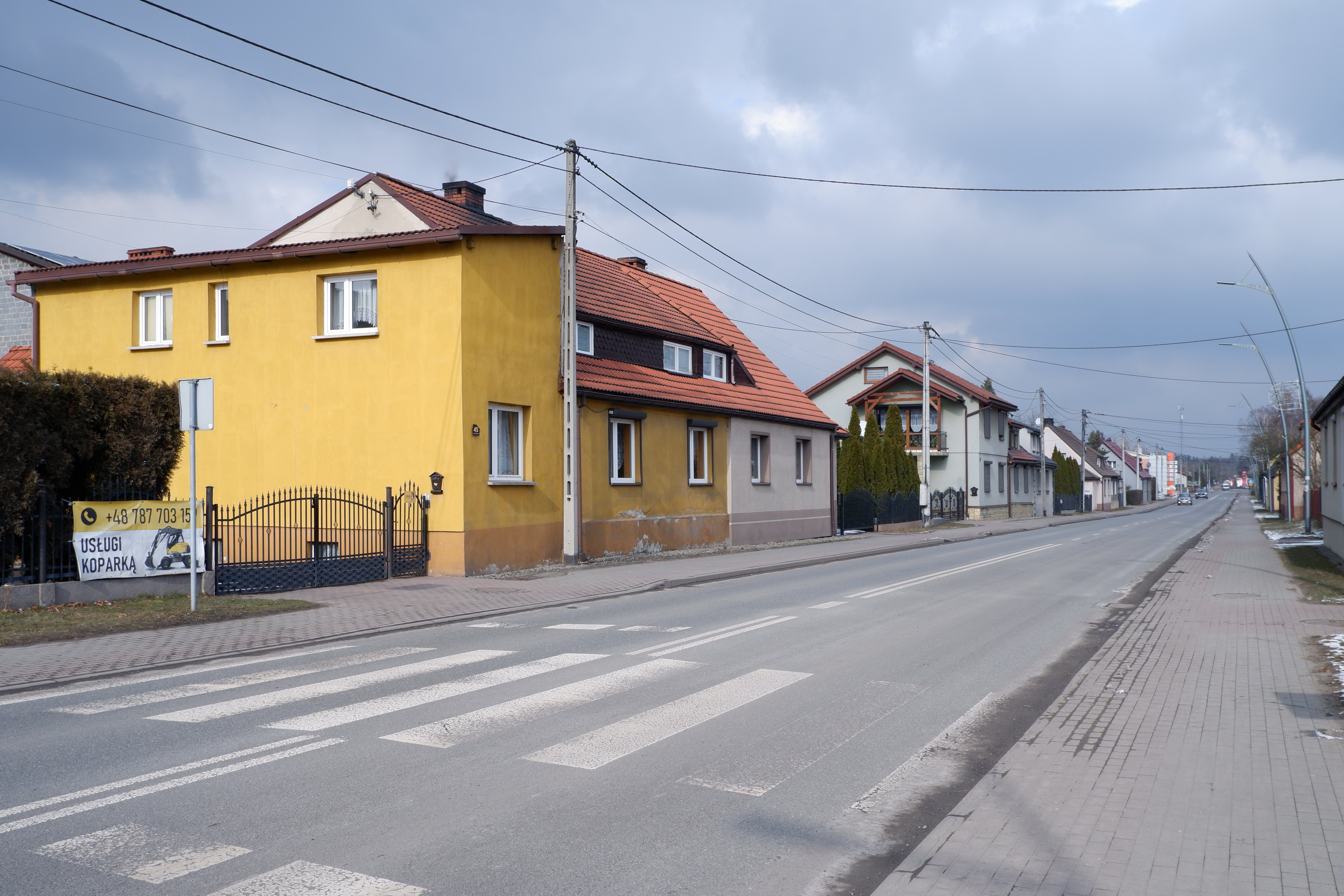
Main street of Hołdunów

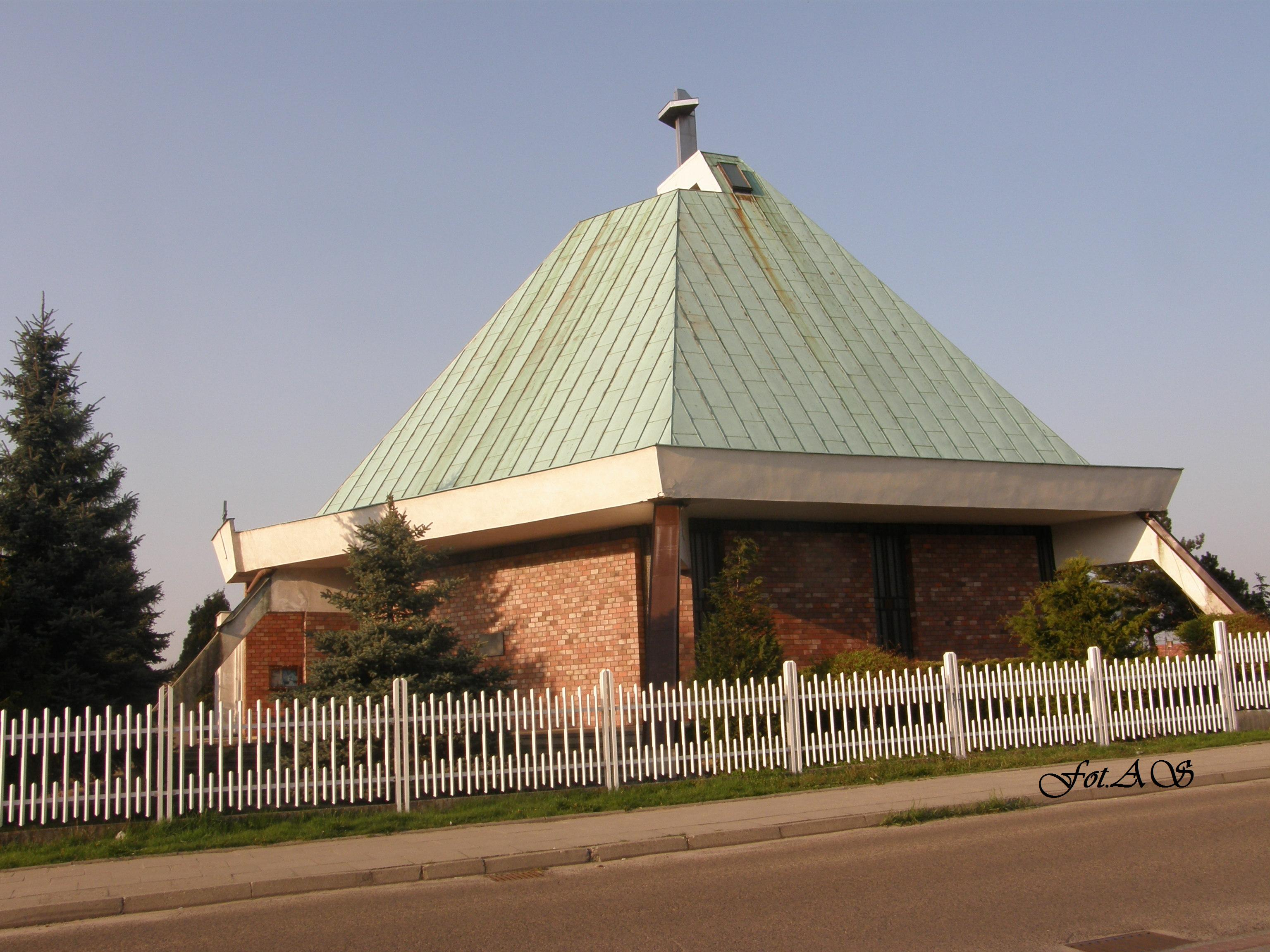
Lutheran church

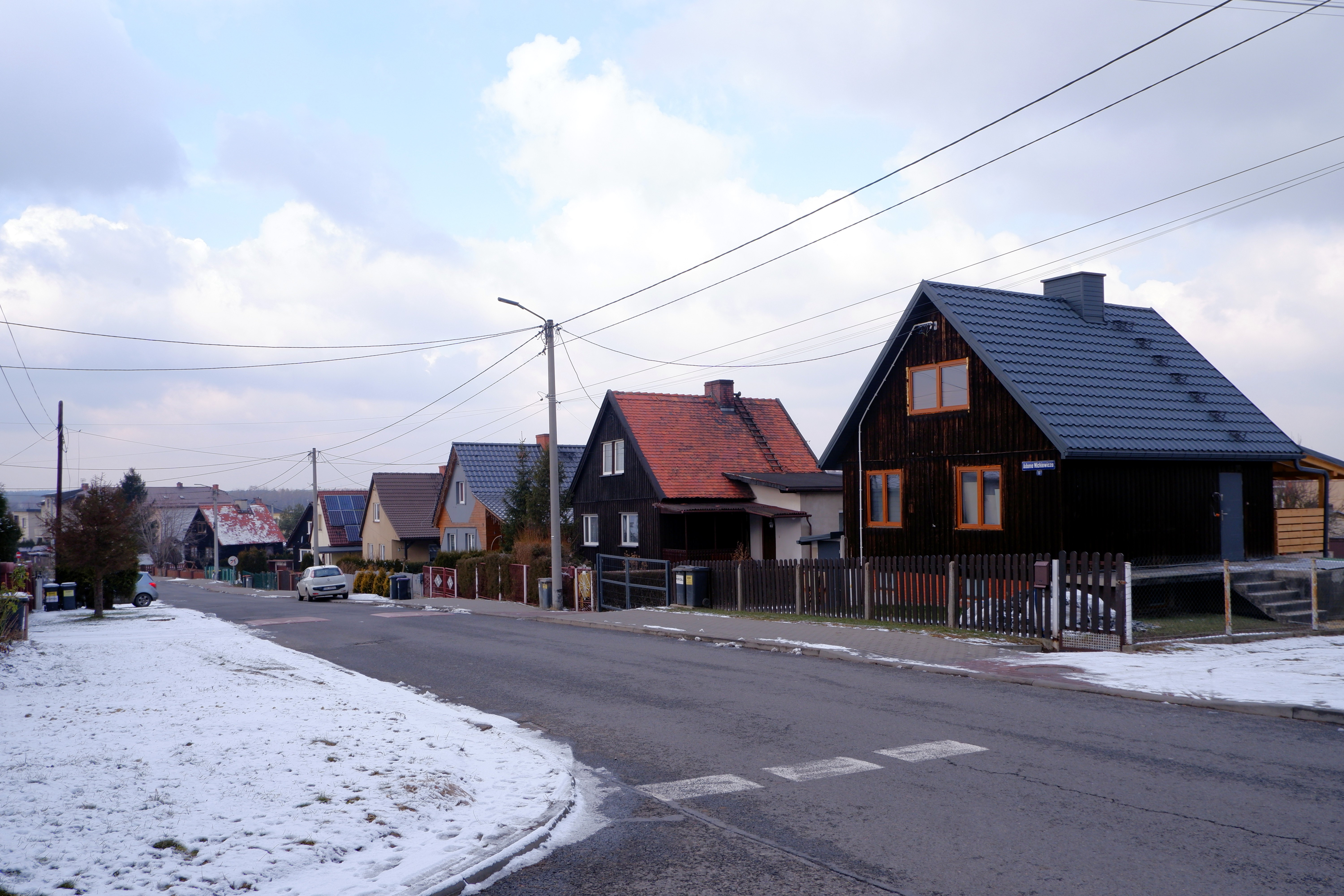
Finnish houses

Hołdunów (German: Anhalt) is a district of Lędziny, Silesian Voivodeship, southern Poland. It was established in 1770 and merged with Lędziny in 1991. At the end of 2014 it had 5,399 inhabitants.

== History ==
The settlement was established in 1770 by about 300 Calvinists fleeing religious persecution from the village of Kozy in the Polish–Lithuanian Commonwealth across the border to Upper Silesia in the Kingdom of Prussia. (They were German-speakers and were descended from medieval colonists from central Germany.) The refugees, who came at the invitation of the Duke of Pless and under the guard of a detachment of his cavalry, established a village on the fields of Lędziny's folwark Kiełpowy, called Anhalt, named after the rulers of nearby Pless (Polish: Pszczyna).

At the beginning of the Second Silesian Uprising (August 1920), the village was attacked and burned by Polish insurgents. The reason for this is not clear: Polish sources claim that the village was burned after a battle with a pro-German militia organized there, while German sources deny that such a militia existed and claim that the inhabitants did not resist the Polish attackers. The burning of Hołdunów was publicized in the German media as an example of the alleged barbarism of the Polish insurgents. Shortly afterwards, Wojciech Korfanty, one of the uprising's leaders, came to Hołdunów, apologized for its destruction, and paid for its reconstruction. In the Upper Silesia plebiscite (1921) Germany got 294 votes against 76 for Poland. Nonetheless Hołdunów became a part of Poland. In the interwar period it was one of only four municipalities in the Upper Silesian (thus excluding Cieszyn Silesia) part of autonomous Silesian Voivodeship, which had Protestant majority (70.6% in 1933). It was later annexed by Nazi Germany at the beginning of World War II, and returned to Poland afterwards.

In 1975 Hołdunów together with Lędziny were amalgamated with Tychy. Lędziny regained town rights in 1991 and absorbed Hołdunów.
