= Slavošovce =

Municipality in Slovakia

Slavošovce Nagyszabos
- Municipality
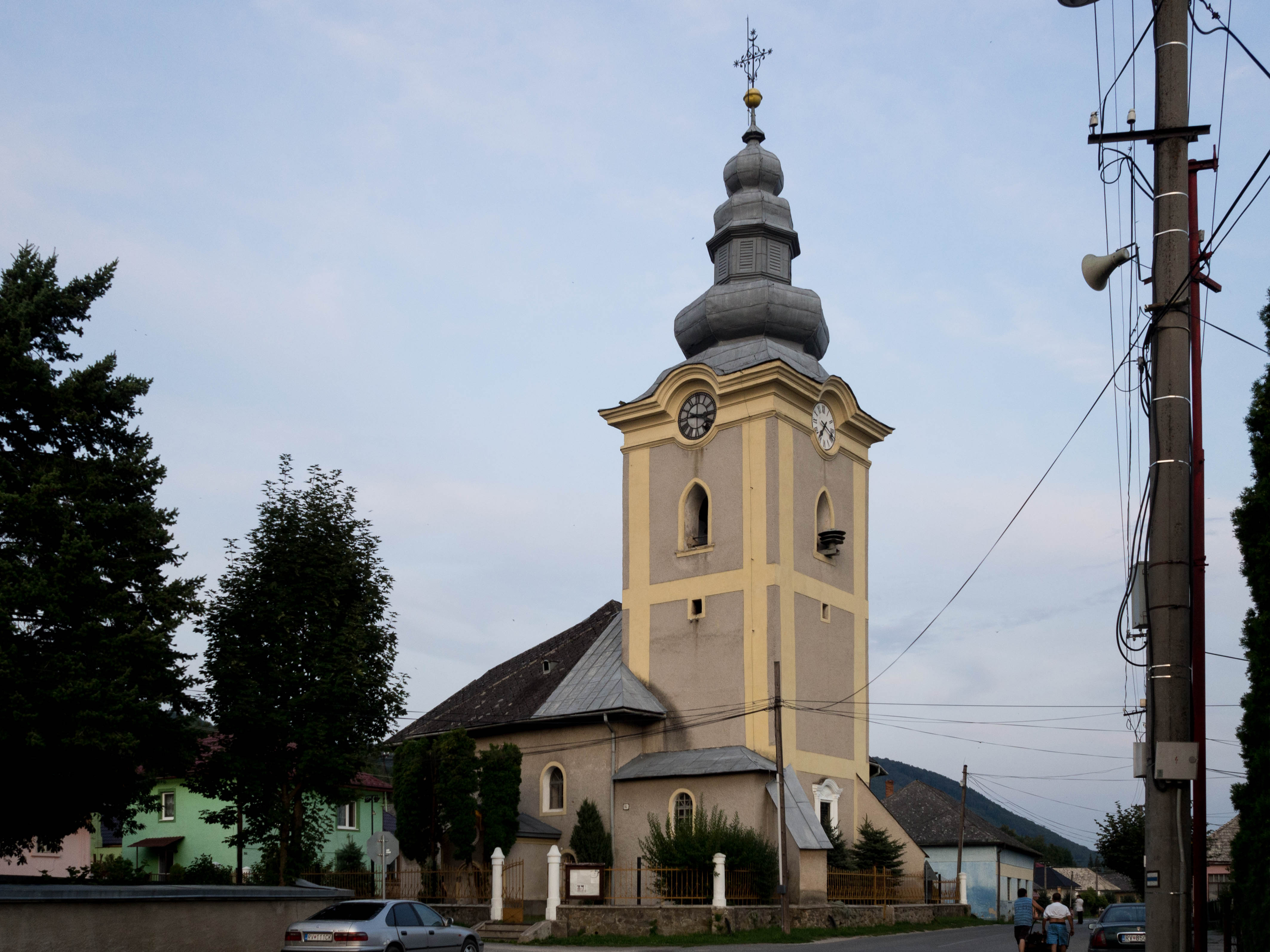

- Flag

- Location of Slavošovce in the Košice Region Location of Slavošovce in Slovakia
- Coordinates: 48.72°N 20.28°E
- Country: Slovakia
- Region: Košice Region
- District: Rožňava District
- First mentioned: 1318

Area
  - Total: 15.53 km^{2} (6.00 sq mi)
- Elevation: 416 m (1,365 ft)

Population (2025)
  - Total: 1,797
- Time zone: UTC+1 (CET)
  - Summer (DST): UTC+2 (CEST)
- Postal code: 493 6
- Area code: +421 58
- Vehicle registration plate (until 2022): RV
- Website: www.slavosovce.sk

Slavošovce (Hungarian: Nagyszabos) is a small village and municipality in the Rožňava District in the Košice Region of middle-eastern Slovakia. Slavošovce is known for its beautiful hiking trails and scenery. Village at the time of this writing has around 1900 people. The Rodný dom Pavla Dobšinského museum is located here. This museum is about the famous Slovak folklore collector Pavol Dobšinský.

== History ==
In historical records the village was first mentioned in 1318.

While the Ottomans occupied most of central Europe, the region north of lake Balaton remained in the Kingdom of Hungary (1538–1867). The town, named NAGY-SZLÁBOS before 1902, was part of the Austrian monarchy, province of Hungary; in Transleithania after the compromise of 1867 in the Kingdom of Hungary. Before the establishment of independent Czechoslovakia in 1918, Slavošovce was part of Gömör and Kishont County within the Kingdom of Hungary. From 1939 to 1945, it was part of the Slovak Republic.

== Geography ==
The municipality lies at an altitude of 416 metres (1,365 ft) and covers an area of 15.53 km^{2} (6.00 sq mi) (2025).

== Population ==
Population statistic (10 years)
Year	1995	2005	2015	2025
Count	1829	1835	1904	1797
Difference		+0.32%	+3.76%	−5.61%

Population statistic
Year	2024	2025
Count	1804	1797
Difference		−0.38%

It has a population of 1797 people (31 December 2025).

=== Ethnicity ===
Census 2021 (1+ %)
Ethnicity	Number	Fraction
Slovak	1495	83.19%
Not found out	273	15.19%
Romani	84	4.67%
Hungarian	26	1.44%
Total	1797	

In year 2021 was 1797 people by ethnicity 1495 as Slovak, 273 as Not found out, 84 as Romani, 26 as Hungarian, 10 as Czech, 4 as Rusyn, 3 as Other and 1 as German.

Note on population: The difference values of population numbers in the table "Population statistic" and in the sections "Ethnicity" & "Religion" is caused by the use of various statistical methods.

=== Religion ===
Census 2021 (1+ %)
Religion	Number	Fraction
None	835	46.47%
Evangelical Church	399	22.2%
Not found out	294	16.36%
Roman Catholic Church	135	7.51%
Apostolic Church	54	3.01%
United Methodist Church	19	1.06%
Total	1797	

In year 2021 was 1797 people by religion 835 from None, 399 from Evangelical Church, 294 from Not found out, 135 from Roman Catholic Church, 54 from Apostolic Church, 19 from United Methodist Church, 17 from Jehovah's Witnesses, 17 from Greek Catholic Church, 8 from Christian Congregations in Slovakia, 4 from Other and not ascertained christian church, 3 from Calvinist Church, 3 from Eastern Orthodox Church, 3 from Seventh-day Adventist Church, 3 from Ad hoc movements, 2 from Other and 1 from Buddhism.

== Culture ==
The village has a public library, a gymnasium and a football pitch.

== Notable people ==
- Pavol Dobšinský (1828–1885), writer
