= Jonatán Dobroslav Čipka =

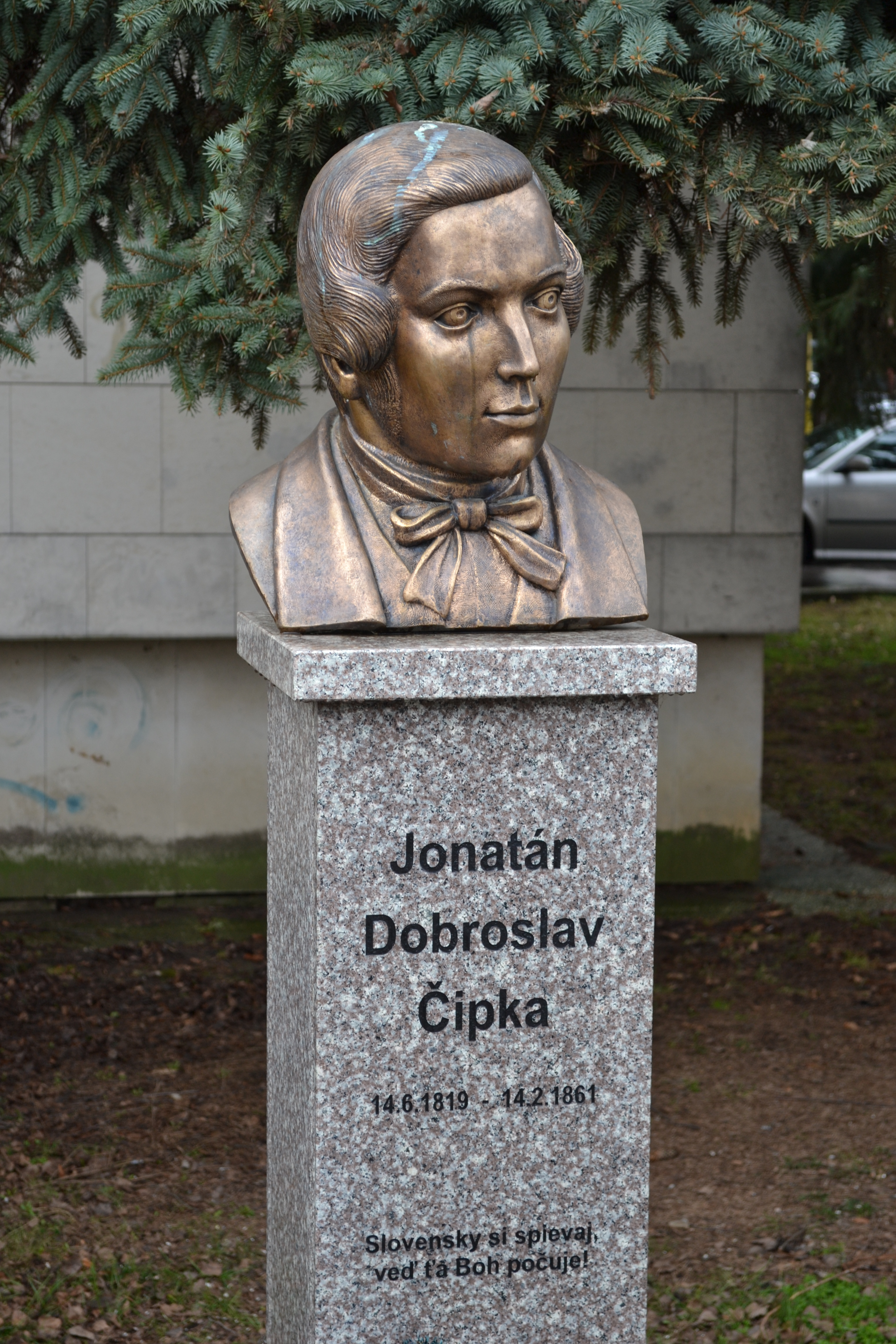
Jonatán Dobroslav Čipka bust in Rimavská Sobota

Jonatán Dobroslav Čipka ( 14 June 1819 – 14 February 1861) was a Slovak priest, poet and author.

== Education and early work ==
He attended the primary school in Tisovec. Then he studied at the Lyceum in Kežmarok and Bratislava. Later he continued his University studies in Jena, where he graduated. After the studies, he was an educator at baron Révay in Mošovce. In the years 1845–1847 he was a teacher and evangelistic chaplain in Ratková. Since the year 1847 he worked as a priest in Drienčany.

He started to express himself in the literature during his studies in Kežmarok, where he worked in the student literary alliance. He wrote and published poems and translations from German language in Fejérpataky calendar and in his own column Slovenský pozorník.

== Village Drienčany ==
The territory in the gate of the canyon-like valley of the river Blh was settled as early as the Neolith, then the Bronze Age and the Iron Age again. Driencany is one of the oldest villages which was donated by the king to the Balogh family for merits in the mid 12th century. The oldest written reference of the village dates back to the year 1291. In the 14th century one branch of the extended family set up their residence here, built a fortified castle and adopted the name after the village – Derencsényi. They are likely to have built also the Church of All Saints in the second half of the 13th century.

The village was totally destroyed during the Turkish invasion around the year 1560. In the early 17th century it was re-settled and later, in the 19th century Driencany became an important centre of economic and cultural life. Many poets, writers and folklorist used to visit the village. The most famous among them were Pavol Emanuel Dobšinský, Ján Cajak, Jonatan Dobroslav Cipka, Ludovít Kubáni and it was also the birthplace of Gustáv Liskay, a professor of geology at the Mining Academy in Banská Štiavnica.

== Later works ==
Together with August Horislav Škultéty and Štefan Marko Daxner he inscribed number of collected folk fairytales into the so-called Codex Tisovecký, that has belonged to the fundamental streams, sources in publishing of folk fairytales. The fairytales collected by him were issued also in Francisci Slovenské Povesti, or Dobšinský Prostonárodné Slovenské Povesti.

Together with the August Horislav Škultéty, he published funny magazine Zornička, pap magazine for children, which was the basic literary work in the literature for Slovak youth. Here he published a quantity of his own poetry—prose and poesy dedicated especially for children. He was inspired particularly with a fairytale, but he also used his priest and teacher knowledges, which were necessary for moral ending of his work.
