= Dlhá Ves =

Village and municipality in Slovakia

Dlhá Ves Hosszúszó
- Municipality
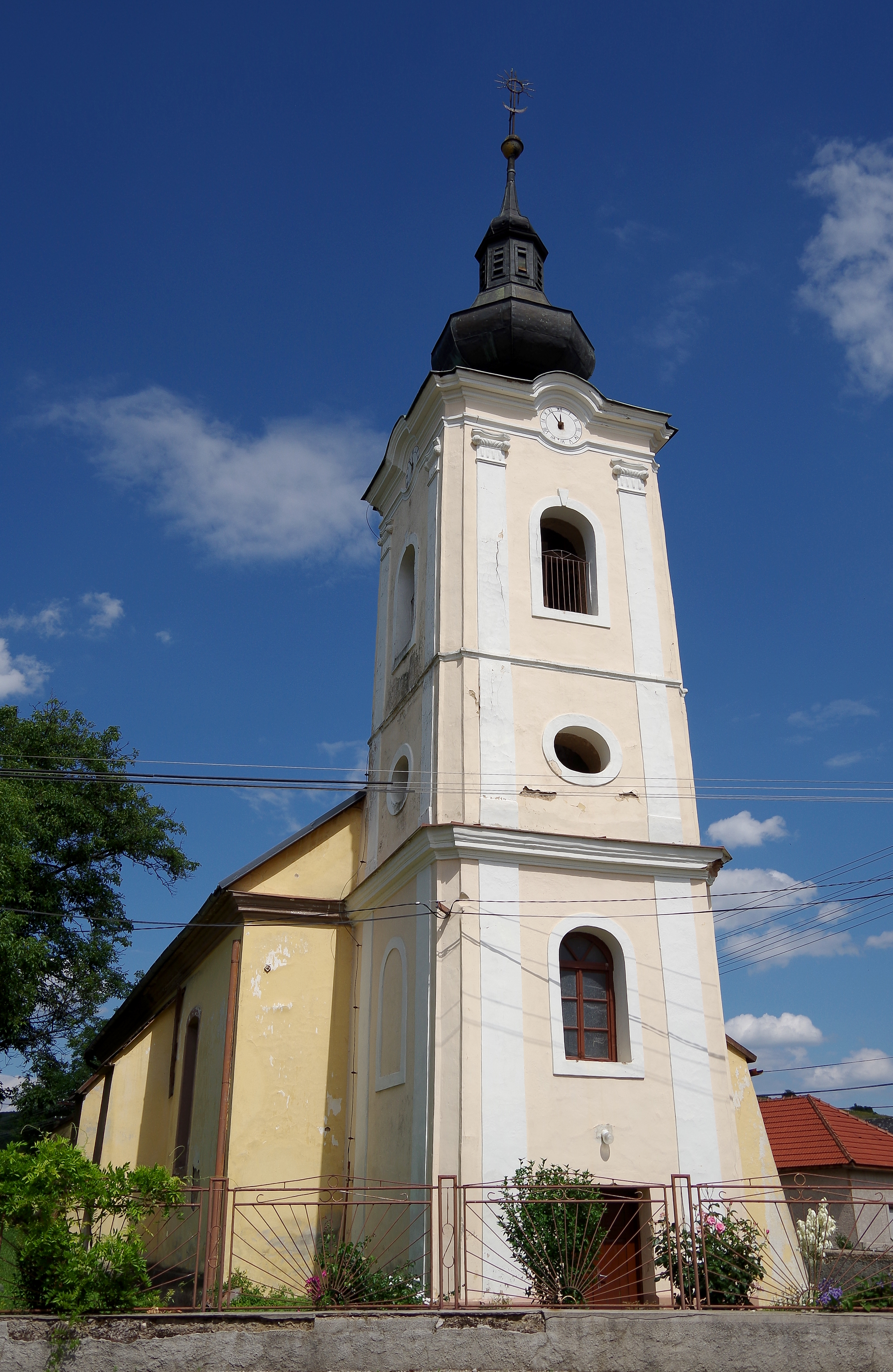

- Flag

- Location of Dlhá Ves in the Košice Region Location of Dlhá Ves in Slovakia
- Coordinates: 48.50°N 20.43°E
- Country: Slovakia
- Region: Košice Region
- District: Rožňava District
- First mentioned: 1332

Area
  - Total: 10.76 km^{2} (4.15 sq mi)
- Elevation: 332 m (1,089 ft)

Population (2025)
  - Total: 534
- Time zone: UTC+1 (CET)
  - Summer (DST): UTC+2 (CEST)
- Postal code: 495 5
- Area code: +421 58
- Vehicle registration plate (until 2022): RV
- Website: www.dlhaves.sk

Dlhá Ves (Hungarian: Gömörhosszúszó) is a village and municipality in the Rožňava District in the Košice Region of eastern Slovakia.

== History ==
In historical records the village was first mentioned in 1332. Before the establishment of independent Czechoslovakia in 1918, Dlhá Ves was part of Gömör and Kishont County within the Kingdom of Hungary. From 1938 to 1944, it was again part of Hungary as a result of the First Vienna Award.

== Geography ==
The municipality lies at an altitude of 332 metres (1,089 ft) and covers an area of 10.76 km^{2} (4.15 sq mi) (2025).

== Population ==
Population statistic (10 years)
Year	1995	2005	2015	2025
Count	638	605	566	534
Difference		−5.17%	−6.44%	−5.65%

Population statistic
Year	2024	2025
Count	527	534
Difference		+1.32%

It has a population of 534 people (31 December 2025).

=== Ethnicity ===
Census 2021 (1+ %)
Ethnicity	Number	Fraction
Hungarian	406	77.77%
Slovak	138	26.43%
Not found out	18	3.44%
Total	522	

In year 2021 was 522 people by ethnicity 406 as Hungarian, 138 as Slovak, 18 as Not found out, 4 as Romani, 2 as Czech, 1 as Other and 1 as English.

Note on population: The difference values of population numbers in the table "Population statistic" and in the sections "Ethnicity" & "Religion" is caused by the use of various statistical methods.

=== Religion ===
Census 2021 (1+ %)
Religion	Number	Fraction
Evangelical Church	236	45.21%
None	153	29.31%
Roman Catholic Church	75	14.37%
Calvinist Church	35	6.7%
Not found out	8	1.53%
United Methodist Church	8	1.53%
Total	522	

In year 2021 was 522 people by religion 236 from Evangelical Church, 153 from None, 75 from Roman Catholic Church, 35 from Calvinist Church, 8 from Not found out, 8 from United Methodist Church, 3 from Greek Catholic Church, 3 from Ad hoc movements and 1 from Islam.

== Culture ==
The village has a small public library and a football pitch.

== Genealogical resources ==
The records for genealogical research are available at the state archive "Statny Archiv in Banska Bystrica, Kosice, Slovakia"

- Roman Catholic church records (births/marriages/deaths): 1852-1896 (parish B)
- Reformed Church records (births/marriages/deaths): 1701-1895 (parish B)

== See also ==
- List of municipalities and towns in Slovakia
