= Revúca =

Revúca Nagyrőce
- Municipality
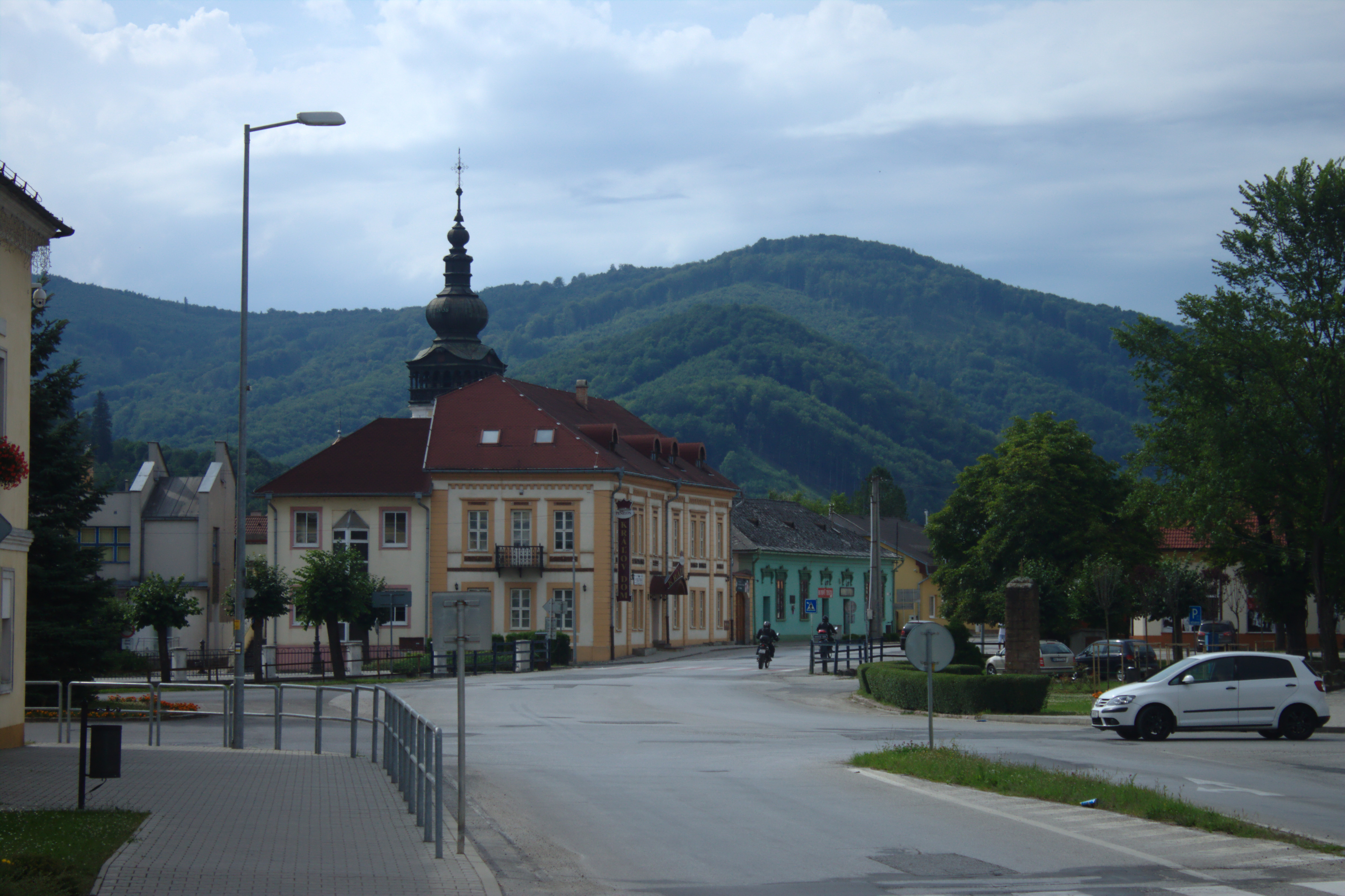
- Main road in Revúca

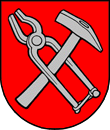
- Flag Coat of arms

- Location of Revúca in the Banská Bystrica Region Location of Revúca in Slovakia
- Coordinates: 48.68°N 20.11°E
- Country: Slovakia
- Region: Banská Bystrica Region
- District: Revúca District
- First mentioned: 1357

Government
  - Mayor: Július Buchta (Ind.)

Area
  - Total: 38.86 km^{2} (15.00 sq mi)
- Elevation: 352 m (1,155 ft)

Population (2025)
  - Total: 10,778
- Time zone: UTC+1 (CET)
  - Summer (DST): UTC+2 (CEST)
- Postal code: 500 1
- Area code: +421 58
- Vehicle registration plate (until 2022): RA
- Website: www.revuca.sk

Revúca (Slovak pronunciation: [ˈreʋuːtsa]; formerly Veľká Revúca [ˈʋeʎkaː -] in Slovak; German: Groß-Rauschenbach; Hungarian: Nagyrőce) is a town in Banská Bystrica Region, Slovakia. Revúca is the seat of Revúca District.

== Geography ==
The municipality lies at an altitude of 352 metres (1,155 ft) and covers an area of 38.86 km^{2} (15.00 sq mi) (2025).

== Etymology ==
The name is of Slovak origin and was initially the name of Revúca Creek (literally, 'roaring'). The same names can be found also in Liptov (Liptovské Revúce formerly Revúca and the Revúca River).

== History ==
The earliest written record of the existence of the town is from 1357. The iron industry was developing for more than 500 years. During the second half of the 19th century, Revúca became a centre of Slovak national revival. The first high school teaching in Slovak was founded in Revúca in 1862, but it was closed down by the Hungarian authorities in 1874 (see Magyarization). Both the original building of the high school (with the historical exposition) and the new building are the National Cultural Monuments. During the short period of its existence, the high school attracted many activists, writers, and politicians (Štefan Marko Daxner, Ján Francisci, Július Botto, Samuel Ormis, August Horislav Škultéty, Ivan Branislav Zoch) to the town.

== Landmarks ==
The late Gothic Roman Catholic church of Saint Lawrence (Slovak: Kostol svätého Vavrinca) has a deacon built in the second half of the 15th century and a pre-built tower. Originally, the church had two towers, but the lower one was dismantled after the fire in 1892. The main, pseudo-Gothic altar is decorated by table pictures depicting scenes from the life of Saint Quirin dated to about 1500.

Evangelic Classical Lutheran Church, a cultural monument. It was built in 1784–1785, the tower was built later in 1788. A commemorative board on the church is dedicated to the Slovak Lutheran grammar school- The first Slovak grammar school that was opened on September 16, 1862.

== Surroundings ==
Revúca is a trailhead of several hiking trails leading to the Muránska planina National Park. Muráň Castle and Ochtiná Aragonite Cave are just a short drive from the town.

== Population ==
Historical population
Year	Pop.	±%
1970	6,743	—
1980	11,354	+68.4%
1991	13,773	+21.3%
2001	13,466	−2.2%
2011	12,828	−4.7%
2021	11,484	−10.5%
Source: Censuses

Population statistic (10 years)
Year	1995	2005	2015	2025
Count	13,974	13,098	12,466	10,778
Difference		−6.26%	−4.82%	−13.54%

Population statistic
Year	2024	2025
Count	10,874	10,778
Difference		−0.88%

It has a population of 10,778 people (31 December 2025).

=== Ethnicity ===
Census 2021 (1+ %)
Ethnicity	Number	Fraction
Slovak	10,009	87.15%
Not found out	1318	11.47%
Romani	656	5.71%
Hungarian	183	1.59%
Total	11,484	

In year 2021 was 11,484 people by ethnicity 10,009 as Slovak, 1318 as Not found out, 656 as Romani, 183 as Hungarian, 51 as Czech, 33 as Ukrainian, 30 as Other, 20 as Rusyn, 14 as Russian, 7 as German, 6 as English, 5 as Chinese, 4 as Vietnamese, 3 as Turkish, 3 as Polish, 3 as Albanian, 2 as Jewish, 2 as Irish, 2 as Canadian, 2 as French, 1 as Italian, 1 as Romanian, 1 as Moravian and 1 as Greek.

Note on population: The difference values of population numbers in the table "Population statistic" and in the sections "Ethnicity" & "Religion" is caused by the use of various statistical methods.

=== Religion ===
Census 2021 (1+ %)
Religion	Number	Fraction
None	5158	44.91%
Roman Catholic Church	3230	28.13%
Evangelical Church	1396	12.16%
Not found out	1210	10.54%
Greek Catholic Church	158	1.38%
Total	11,484	

In year 2021 was 11,484 people by religion 5158 from None, 3230 from Roman Catholic Church, 1396 from Evangelical Church, 1210 from Not found out, 158 from Greek Catholic Church, 56 from Jehovah's Witnesses, 52 from Baptists Church, 51 from Eastern Orthodox Church, 42 from Calvinist Church, 29 from Seventh-day Adventist Church, 26 from Ad hoc movements, 16 from Other, 14 from Christian Congregations in Slovakia, 14 from United Methodist Church, 8 from Islam, 6 from Other and not ascertained christian church, 5 from Paganism and natural spirituality, 5 from Buddhism, 3 from Old Catholic Church, 2 from Jewish community, 1 from Hinduism, 1 from Czechoslovak Hussite Church and 1 from Bahá'i Community.

== Notable people ==
- Norbert Gyömbér – Slovak international football player
- Gyula Rochlitz – architect, designer of Budapest's Keleti Pályaudvar (Eastern Railway Station)
- Rudolf Viest – General, commander-in-chief in the Slovak National Uprising
- Andrej Danko (born 1974) – Slovak lawyer, speaker of the National Council, and leading member of Slovak National Party
- Samuel Reuss – Lutheran pastor

== Twin towns — Sister cities ==
Revúca is twinned with:

- Lędziny, Poland
- Kazincbarcika, Hungary
- Litovel, Czech Republic
- Pakrac, Croatia
- Selca, Croatia
- Lipik, Croatia
