= Rozložná =

Village and municipality in Slovakia

Rozložná Hámosfalva
- Municipality
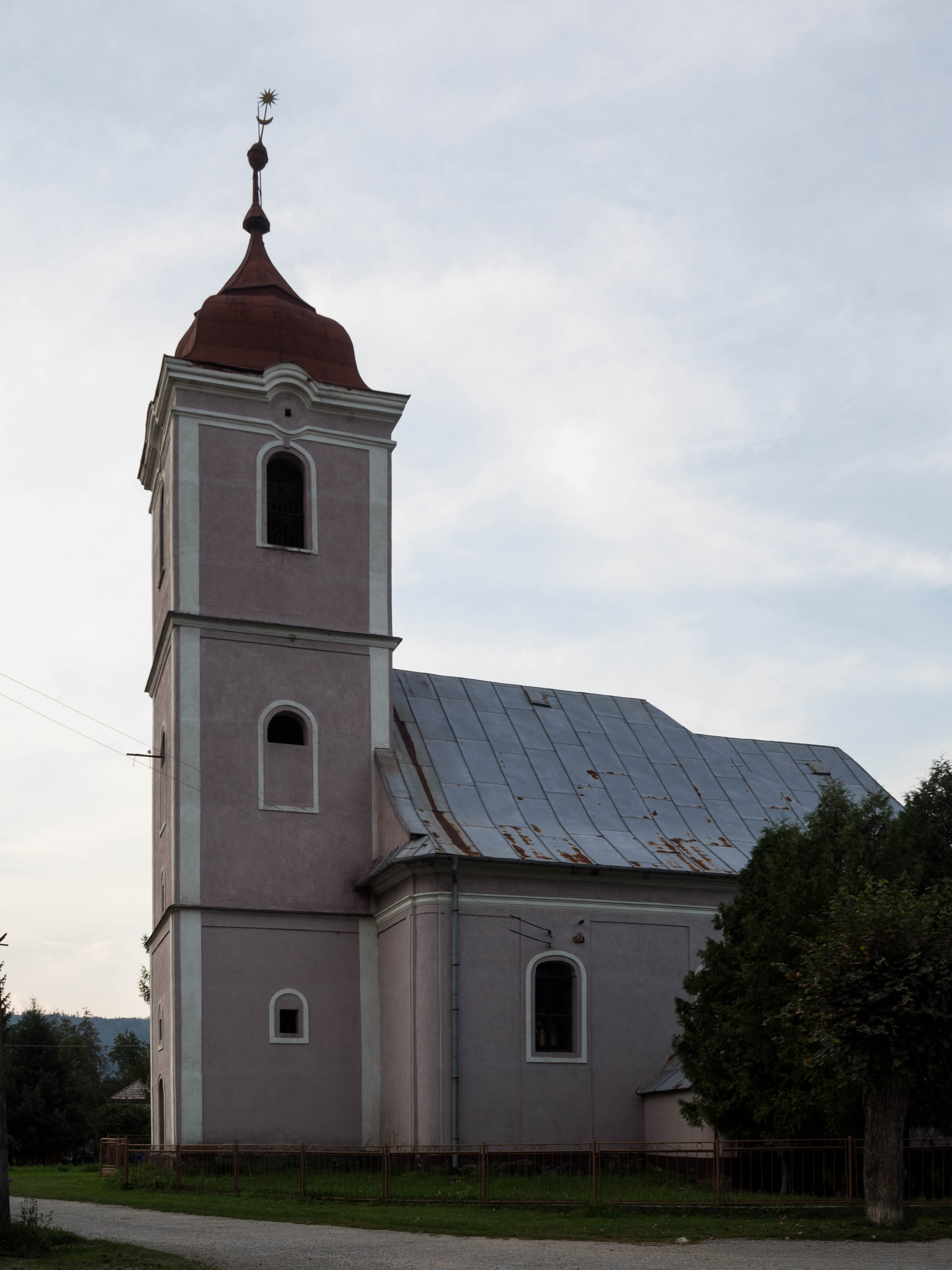

- Flag

- Location of Rozložná in the Košice Region Location of Rozložná in Slovakia
- Coordinates: 48.62°N 20.35°E
- Country: Slovakia
- Region: Košice Region
- District: Rožňava District
- First mentioned: 1241

Area
  - Total: 12.58 km^{2} (4.86 sq mi)
- Elevation: 283 m (928 ft)

Population (2025)
  - Total: 206
- Time zone: UTC+1 (CET)
  - Summer (DST): UTC+2 (CEST)
- Postal code: 493 3
- Area code: +421 58
- Vehicle registration plate (until 2022): RV
- Website: rozlozna.estranky.sk

Rozložná (Hungarian: Hámosfalva) is a village and municipality in the Rožňava District in the Košice Region of middle-eastern Slovakia.

== History ==
In historical records the village was first mentioned in 1241. Before the establishment of independent Czechoslovakia in 1918, Rozložná was part of Gömör and Kishont County within the Kingdom of Hungary. From 1939 to 1945, it was part of the Slovak Republic.

== Geography ==
The municipality lies at an altitude of 283 metres (928 ft) and covers an area of 12.58 km^{2} (4.86 sq mi) (2025).

== Population ==
Population statistic (10 years)
Year	1995	2005	2015	2025
Count	167	196	211	206
Difference		+17.36%	+7.65%	−2.36%

Population statistic
Year	2024	2025
Count	202	206
Difference		+1.98%

It has a population of 206 people (31 December 2025).

=== Ethnicity ===
Census 2021 (1+ %)
Ethnicity	Number	Fraction
Slovak	201	92.62%
Not found out	16	7.37%
Czech	3	1.38%
Total	217	

In year 2021 was 217 people by ethnicity 201 as Slovak, 16 as Not found out, 3 as Czech, 2 as Romani, 1 as Hungarian, 1 as Other and 1 as Greek.

Note on population: The difference values of population numbers in the table "Population statistic" and in the sections "Ethnicity" & "Religion" is caused by the use of various statistical methods.

=== Religion ===
Census 2021 (1+ %)
Religion	Number	Fraction
None	149	68.66%
Evangelical Church	24	11.06%
Not found out	19	8.76%
Roman Catholic Church	11	5.07%
Apostolic Church	8	3.69%
Total	217	

In year 2021 was 217 people by religion 149 from None, 24 from Evangelical Church, 19 from Not found out, 11 from Roman Catholic Church, 8 from Apostolic Church, 2 from Calvinist Church, 1 from Jehovah's Witnesses, 1 from Greek Catholic Church, 1 from United Methodist Church and 1 from Ad hoc movements.

== Culture ==
The village has a public library.
