= Bratislava =

Capital and largest city of Slovakia

- Capital city
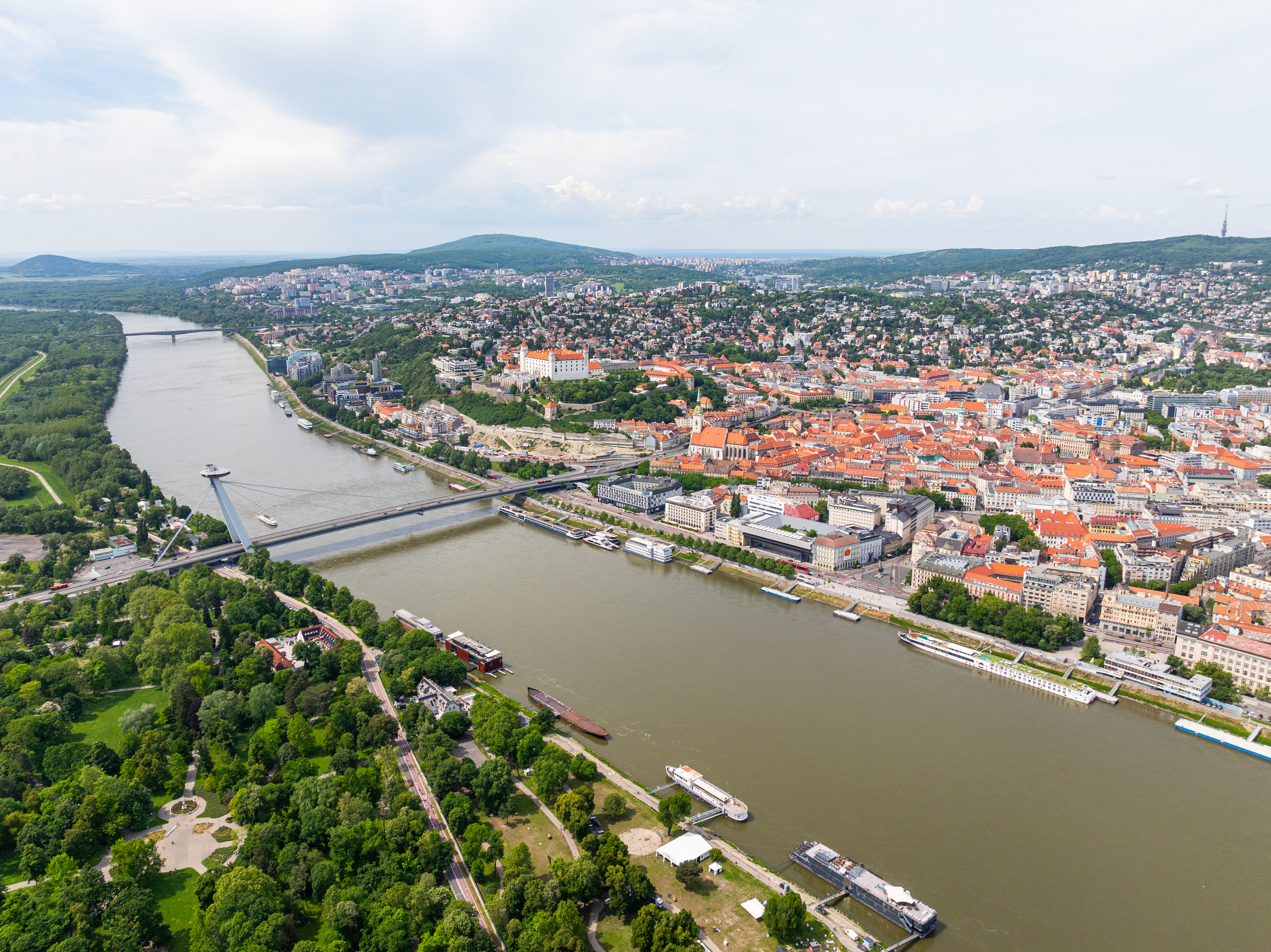
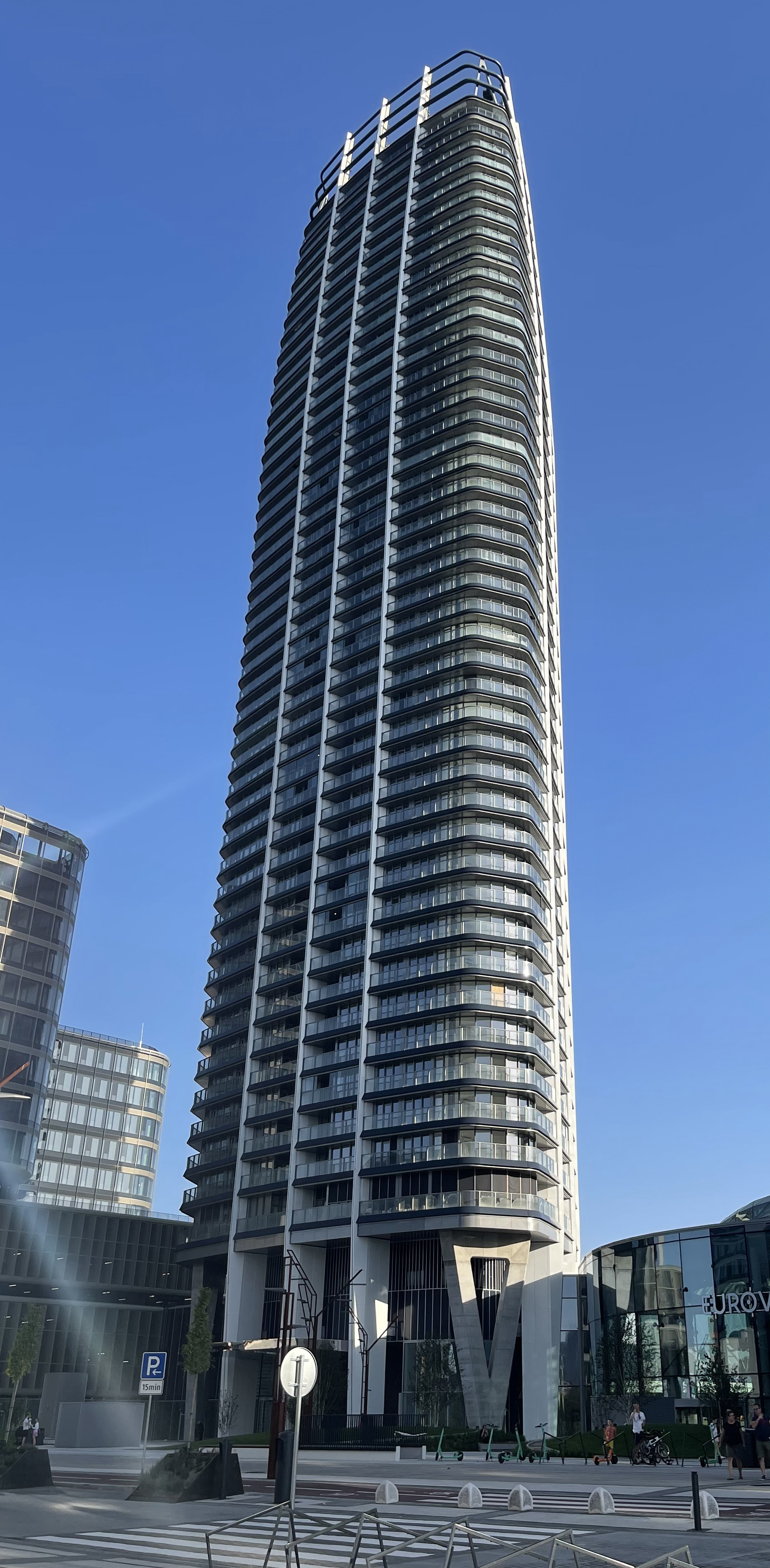
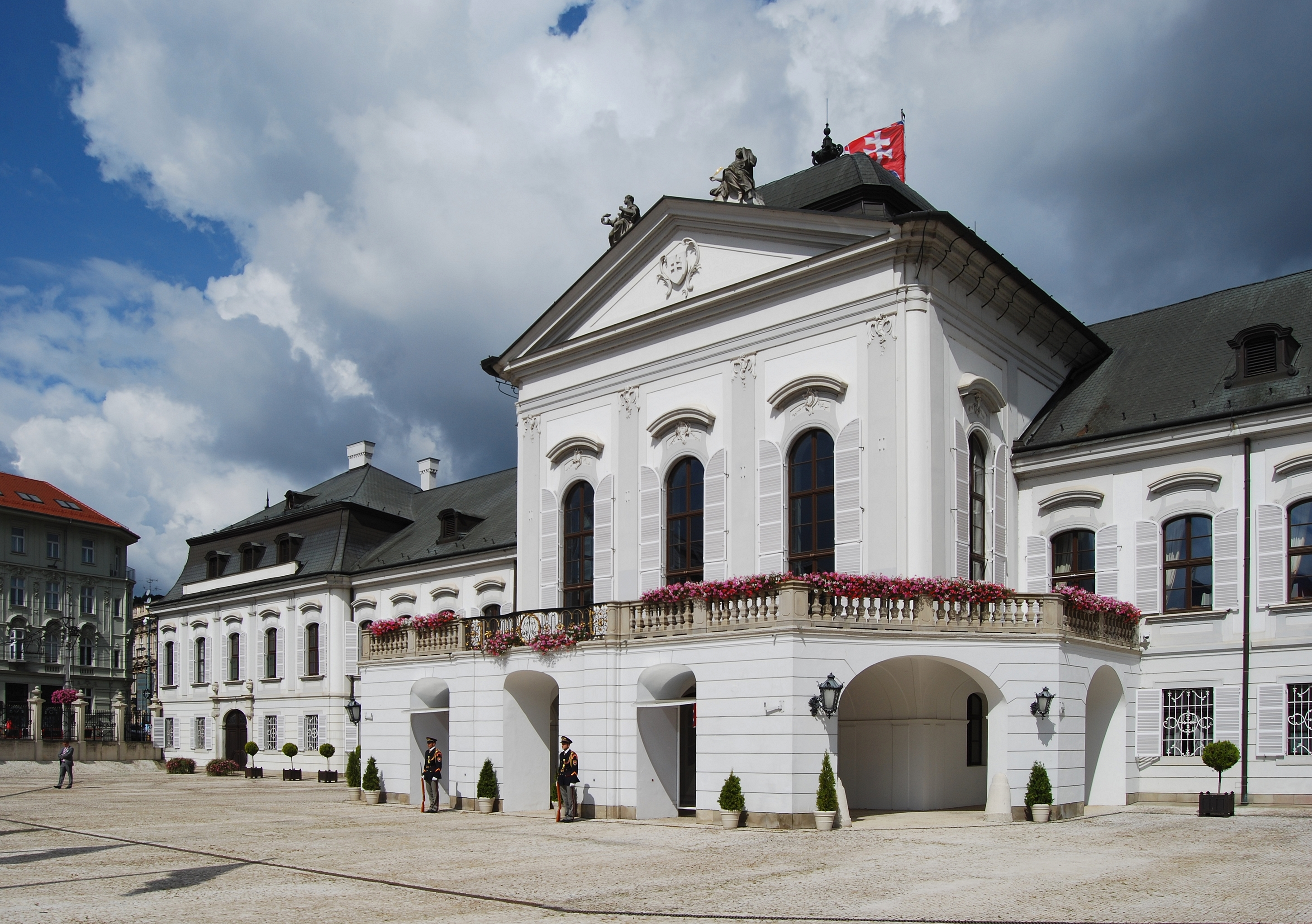
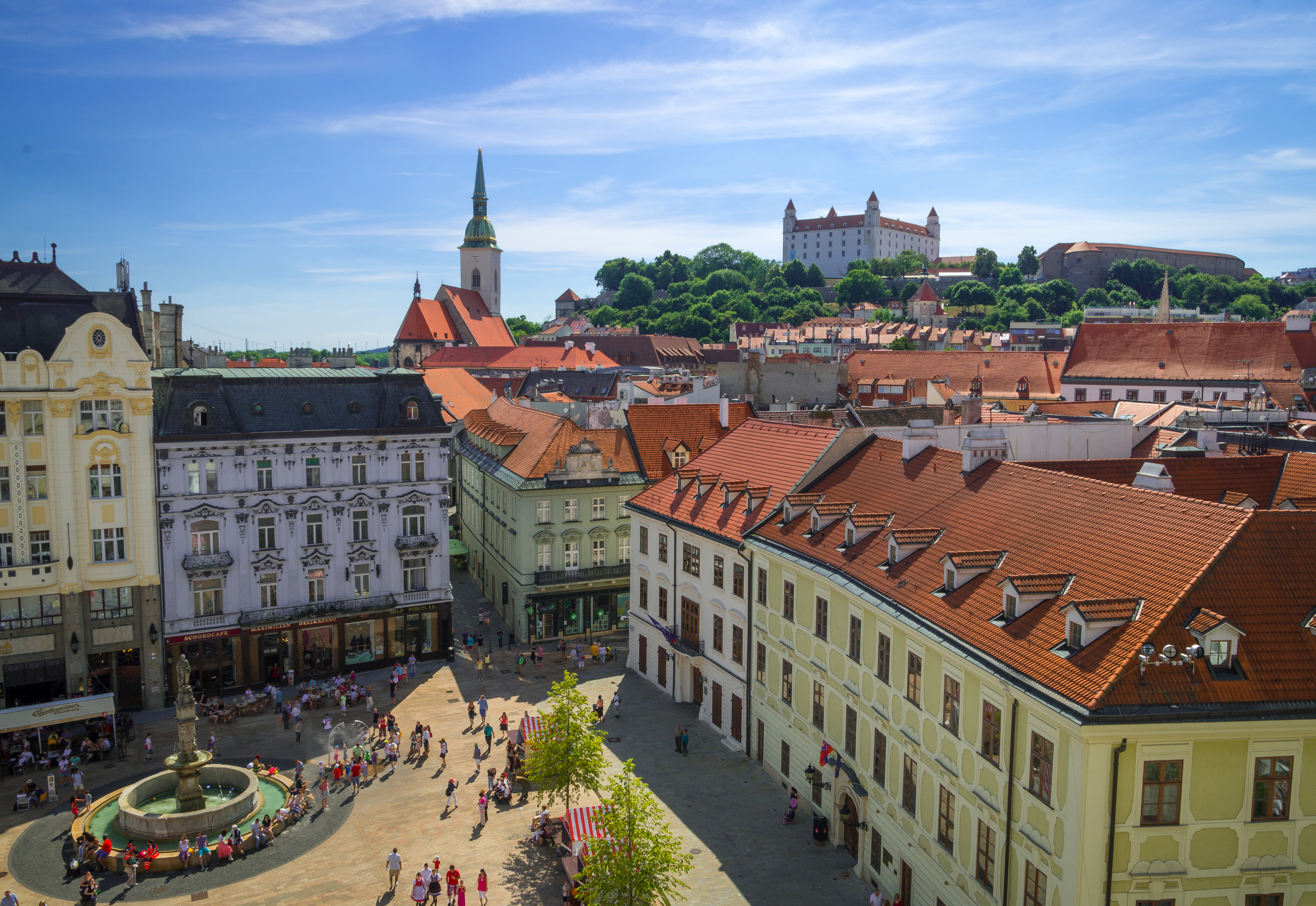
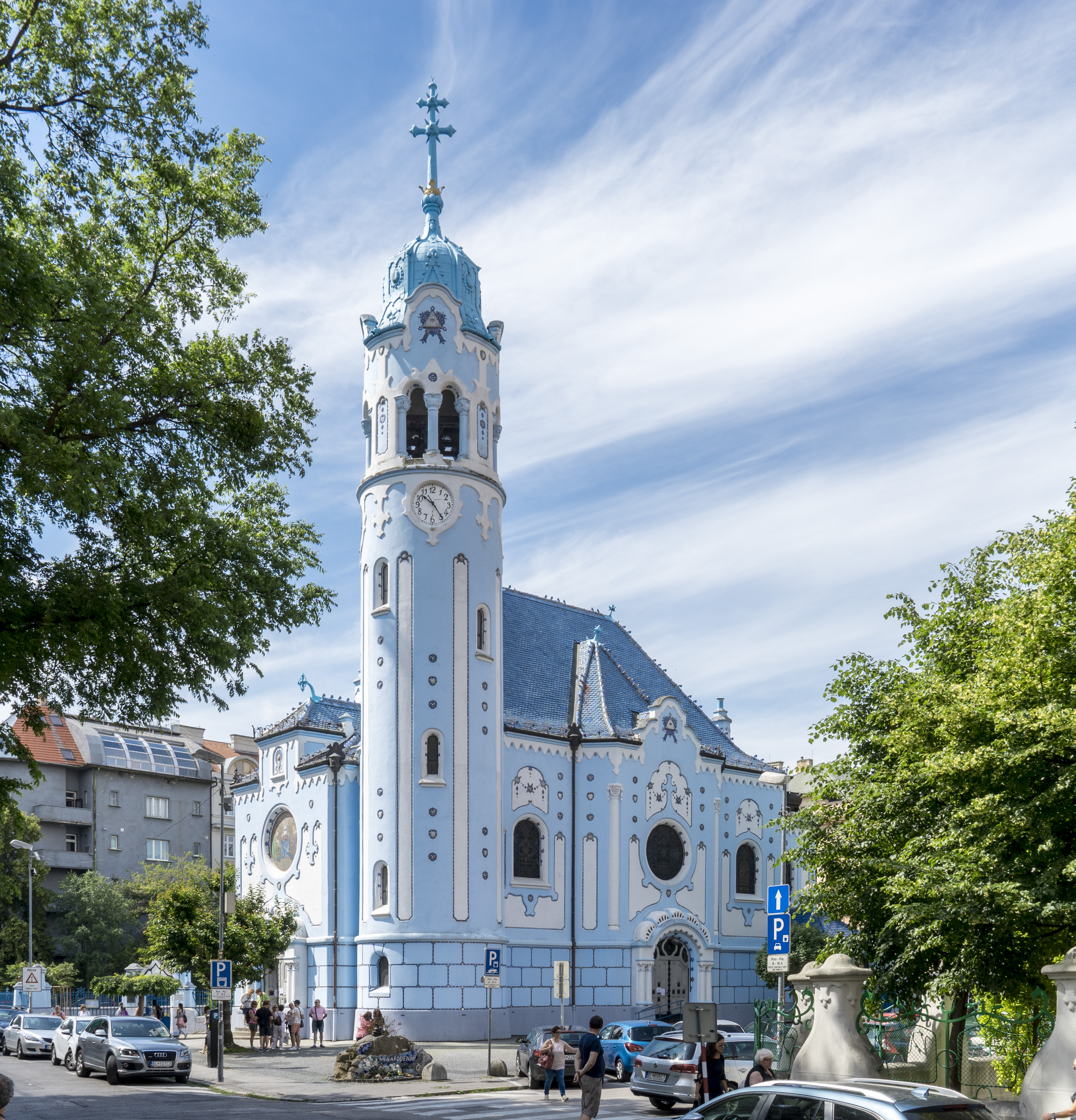
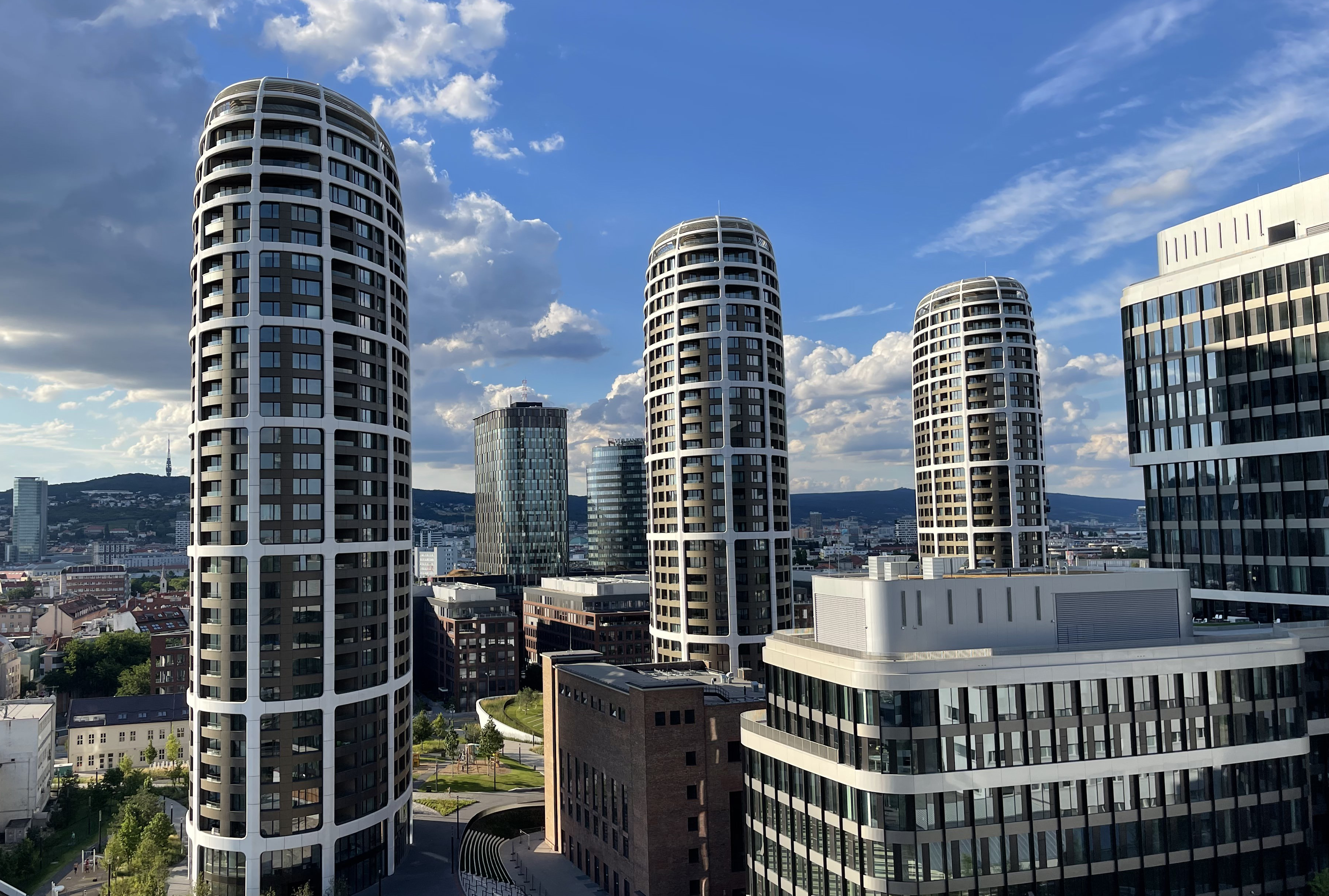
- View of Bratislava over the Danube Eurovea Tower Grassalkovich Palace Streets of Old Town and Main Square Blue Church Sky Park in business district

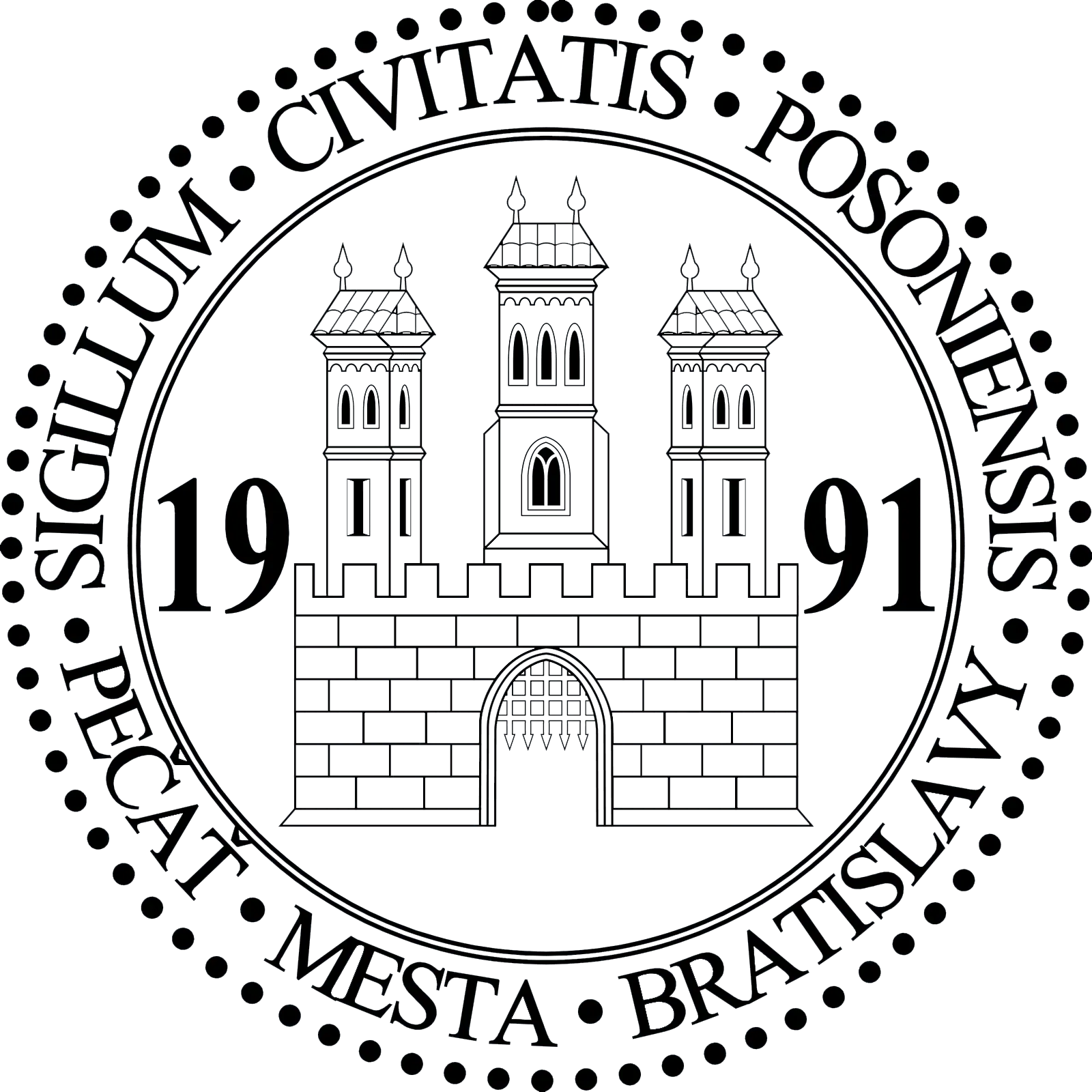
- Flag Seal Coat of arms Logo
- Nicknames: Beauty on the Danube, Blava, Coronation City, Little Big City, Partyslava
- Location of Bratislava in Slovakia Bratislava (Europe)
- Coordinates: 48°08′38″N 17°06′35″E
- Country: Slovakia
- Region: Bratislava
- First mentioned: 907; 1119 years ago, as Brezalauspurc
- Charter Royal free city: 2 December 1291; 734 years ago
- Capital city of Slovak Republic: 1 January 1993; 33 years ago
- Administrative HQ: Primate's Palace, Old Town
- Local government: 17 Bratislava boroughs

Government
  - Type: Mayor–council government
  - Body: Bratislava City Council
  - Mayor: Matúš Vallo (Team Bratislava)
  - City Council: 45 members

Area
  - Capital city: 367.66 km^{2} (141.95 sq mi)
  - Urban: 853.15 km^{2} (329.40 sq mi)
  - Region: 2,053 km^{2} (793 sq mi)
- Elevation (Danube): 124 m (407 ft)
- Highest elevation (Devínska Kobyla): 514 m (1,686 ft)

Population (2025)
  - Capital city: 480,902
  - Rank: 1st in Slovakia; 57th in the EU
  - Metro: 1,300,000 (Note: Bratislava metropolitan region is defined as the combined territory of the Bratislava and Trnava self-governing regions.)
  - Region: 732,000
  - Density: 1,297/km^{2} (3,360/sq mi)
- Demonyms: Bratislavčan (m), Bratislavčanka (f) (sk), Bratislavan (en), pozsonyi (hu), Preßburger (de)

Ethnicity (2021)
  - Ethnic groups: List: 86% Slovaks; 3% Hungarians; 1% Czechs; 10% other/not stated

Religion (2021)
  - Religion: List: 40% Irreligion; 35% Christianity; 30% Catholicism; 4% Evangelicalism; 1% Greek Catholic; 15% other; 10% not stated
- Time zone: UTC+1 (CET)
  - Summer (DST): UTC+2 (CEST)
- Postal code: 8XX XX
- Area code: +421 2
- Vehicle registration plate (until 2022): BA, BL, BT
- City budget: €760.5 million (2026)
- Website: bratislava.sk/en

Bratislava (Note: English: /ˌbrætɪˈslɑːvə/ BRAT-iss-LAH-və, US also /ˌbrɑːt-/ BRAHT-, Slovak: [ˈbracislaʋa]; Hungarian: Pozsony, pronounced [ˈpoʒoɲ]; outdated German: Pressburg or Preßburg, pronounced [ˈpʁɛsbʊʁk]; superseded Slovak: Prešporok – the name fell out of use after the establishment of Czechoslovakia.) is the capital and largest city of Slovakia and the fourth largest of all cities on the river Danube. Officially, the population of the city proper is about 479,000, with the wider Bratislava Region exceeding 732,000 inhabitants. The metropolitan area has a population of approximately 1.3 million. (Note: Bratislava metropolitan region is defined as the combined territory of the Bratislava and Trnava self-governing regions.)

Bratislava is in southwestern Slovakia at the foot of the Little Carpathians, occupying both banks of the Danube and the left bank of the River Morava. The city is situated on the border of three countries—Slovakia, Austria, and Hungary—and is the only national capital to have land borders with two other sovereign states. (Note: City-state Singapore has maritime borders with Malaysia and Indonesia.) Its geographic position places it exceptionally close to the Austrian capital, Vienna, making them the closest pair of capital cities in Europe at just 50 kilometres (31 mi) apart.

The city's history has been influenced by people of many nations and religions, including Austrians, Bulgarians, Croats, Czechs, Germans, Hungarians, Jews, and Slovaks. It was the coronation site and legislative centre and capital of the Kingdom of Hungary from 1536 to 1783; eleven Hungarian kings and eight queens were crowned in St Martin's Cathedral. Most Hungarian parliament assemblies were held in Bratislava from the 17th century until the Hungarian Reform Era, and the city has been home to many Hungarian, German, and Slovak historical figures.

Today, Bratislava is the political, cultural, and economic centre of Slovakia. It is the seat of the Slovak president, the parliament, the Slovak Executive, and numerous courts including the Supreme Court and Supreme Administrative Court of Slovakia. It has several universities, and many museums, theatres, galleries, and other cultural and educational institutions. Many large businesses and financial institutions have headquarters here. Bratislava is the 19th-richest region of the European Union by GDP (PPP) per capita. GDP at purchasing power parity is about three times higher than in other Slovak regions. The city welcomes over one million tourists every year, primarily arriving from the Czech Republic, Germany, Austria and the United Kingdom. In 2024, tourism in Bratislava rebounded to approximately 1.2 million annual visitors.

== Etymology ==
The medieval settlement Brezalauspurc (literally 'Braslav's castle') was first mentioned in 907, and is attributed to Bratislava, but the actual location of Brezalauspurc is under scholarly debate.

The name Pozsony was first mentioned in Establishing charter of the abbey of Pannonhalma [hu] in 1002. The linguist Ján Stanislav believed the city's Hungarian name, Pozsony, to be attributed to the surname Božan, likely a prince who owned the castle before 950. Although the Latin name was also based on the same surname, according to research by the lexicologist Milan Majtán, the Hungarian version is not found in any official records from the time in which the theorised prince would have lived. All three versions, however, were related to those found in Slovak, Czech, and German: Vratislaburgum (905), Braslavespurch, and Preslavasburc (both 907). This however was disproved by János Melich, explaining that contemporary sources prove, that Bozan actually comes from a germanisation by Otto von Freising from the Hungarian name Poson, along with another etymological theory claiming the name traces its origins to Požúň. He, similar to historian Nandor Knauz, claims that the popularity of the name of Old Hungarian origin Poson in the era is the personal name from which the city's name is derived. Flóris Rómer and linguist Lajos Kiss also attributes the name Pozsony (originally spelled Posony) to the Hungarian name Poson, likely the first ispán of the castle. The name then evolved to Praslavia, Praslaburck, and to Preßburg.

After World War I, during the dissolution of Austria-Hungary, between 1918 and 1919, the name Wilsonov or Wilsonstadt was proposed by Slovak Americans. The name was after United States President Woodrow Wilson, as he played a major role in the establishment of the new First Czechoslovak Republic.

The name Bratislava, which had been used only by some Slovak patriots, became official on 16 March 1919, with the aim that a Slavic name could support demands for the city to be part of Czechoslovakia. Until then, it was Pozsony, mostly known in English as Pressburg (from its German name, Preßburg), since after 1526, it was dominated mostly by the Habsburg monarchy and the city had a relevant ethnic German population. That is the term from which the pre-1919 Slovak (Prešporok) and Czech (Prešpurk) names are derived.

The city's modern name Bratislava is credited to Pavol Jozef Šafárik's misinterpretation of Braslav as Bratislav in his analysis of medieval sources, which led him to invent the term Břetislaw, which later became Bratislav.

Other alternative names of the city in the past include Greek: Ιστρόπολις, romanized: Istropolis (meaning 'Danube City', also used in Latin), Latin: Posonium, Romanian: Pojon, Croatian: Požun.

In older documents, confusion can be caused by the Latin forms Bratislavia, Wratislavia etc., which refer to Wrocław (Breslau) in Poland, not Bratislava. The Polish city has a similar etymology despite spelling differences.

== History ==
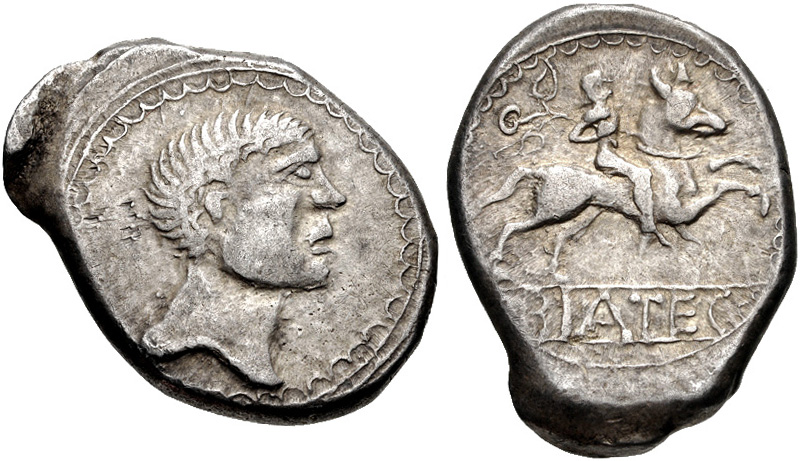
Biatec, presumably a king, who appeared on the Celtic coins minted by the Boii at the current location of Bratislava, 1st century B.C.

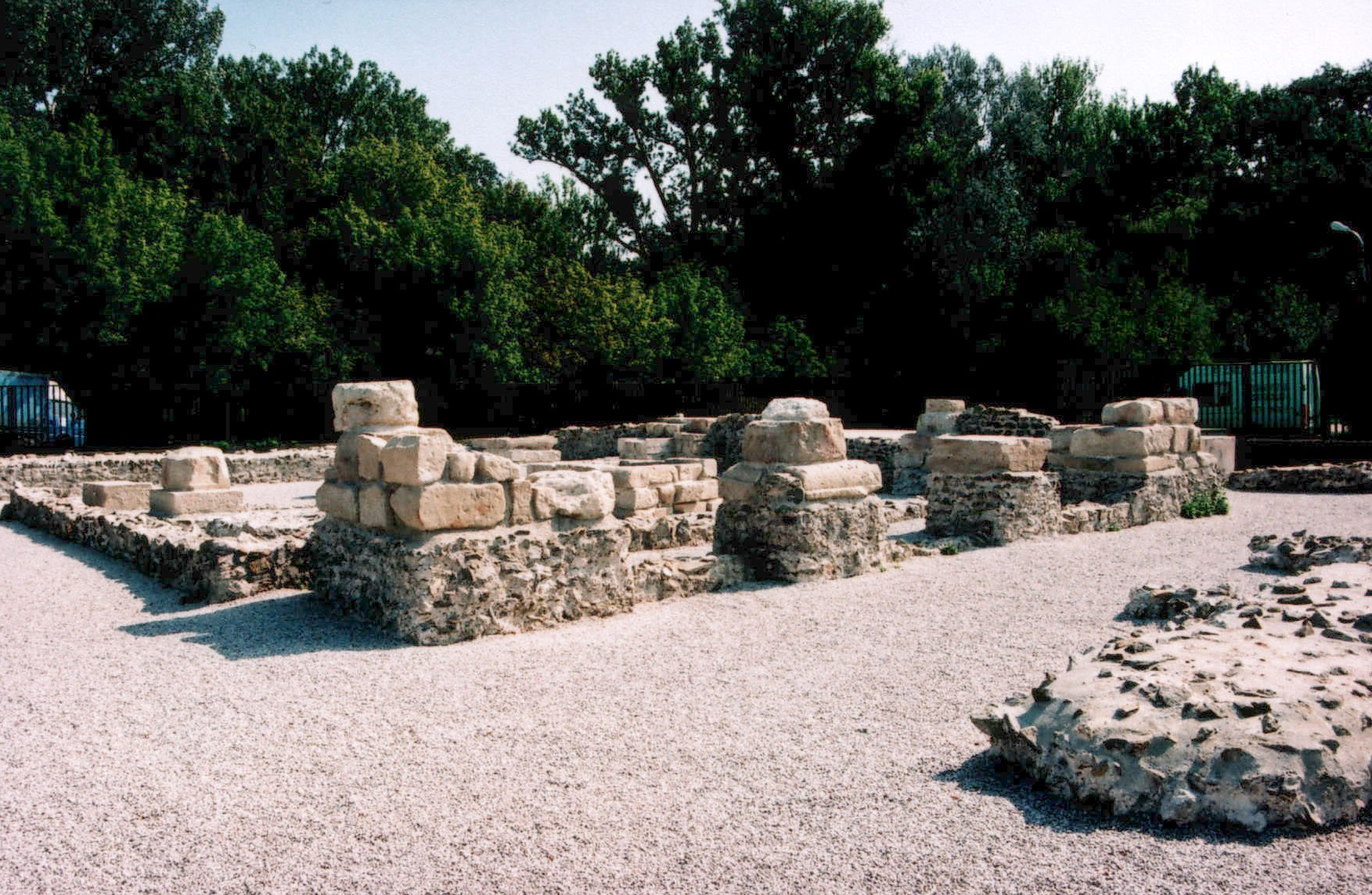
Gerulata, a Roman Empire military camp, built in the 2nd century A.D. at the current location of Bratislava

The first known permanent settlement of the area began with the Linear Pottery Culture, around 5000 B.C. in the Neolithic era. About 200 B.C., the Celtic Boii tribe founded the first significant settlement, a fortified town known as the Bratislava oppidum. They also established a mint, producing gold and silver coins known as biatecs.

The area fell under Roman influence from the 1st to the 4th century A.D. and was made part of the Danubian Limes, a border defence system. The Romans introduced grape growing to the area and began a tradition of winemaking, which survives to the present.

The Slavs arrived from the East between the 5th and 6th centuries during the Migration Period. As a response to onslaughts by Avars, the local Slavic tribes rebelled and established Samo's Empire (623–658), the first known Slavic political entity. In the 9th century, the castles at Bratislava (Brezalauspurk) and Devín (Dowina) were important centres of the Slavic states: the Principality of Nitra and Great Moravia. Scholars have debated the identification as fortresses of the two castles built in Great Moravia, based on linguistic arguments and because of the absence of convincing archaeological evidence.

The first written reference to a settlement named "Brezalauspurc" dates to 907 and is related to the Battle of Pressburg, during which a Bavarian army was defeated by the Hungarians. It is connected to the fall of Great Moravia, already weakened by its own inner decline and under the attacks of the Hungarians. The exact location of the battle remains unknown, and some interpretations place it west of Lake Balaton.

In the 10th century, the territory of Pressburg (what would later become Pozsony county) became part of Hungary (called the "Kingdom of Hungary" from 1000). It developed as a key economic and administrative centre on the kingdom's frontier. In 1052, German Emperor Henry III undertook a fifth campaign against the Kingdom of Hungary, and besieged Pressburg without success, as the Hungarians sank his supply ships on the river Danube. This strategic position destined the city to be the site of frequent attacks and battles, but also brought it economic development and high political status. It was granted its first known "town privileges" in 1291 by the Hungarian King Andrew III, and was declared a free royal city (Libera Regia Civitas). Confirmation and expansion of privileges was made in 1405 by King Sigismund. In 1436, he authorised the town to use its own coat of arms.

The Kingdom of Hungary was defeated by the Ottoman Empire in the Battle of Mohács in 1526. The Ottomans besieged and damaged Pressburg, but failed to conquer it. Owing to Ottoman advances into Hungarian territory, the city was designated the new capital of Hungary in 1536, after becoming part of the Habsburg monarchy and marking the beginning of a new era. The city became a coronation town and the seat of kings, archbishops (1543), the nobility, and all major organisations and offices. Between 1536 and 1830, eleven Hungarian kings and queens were crowned at St. Martin's Cathedral.

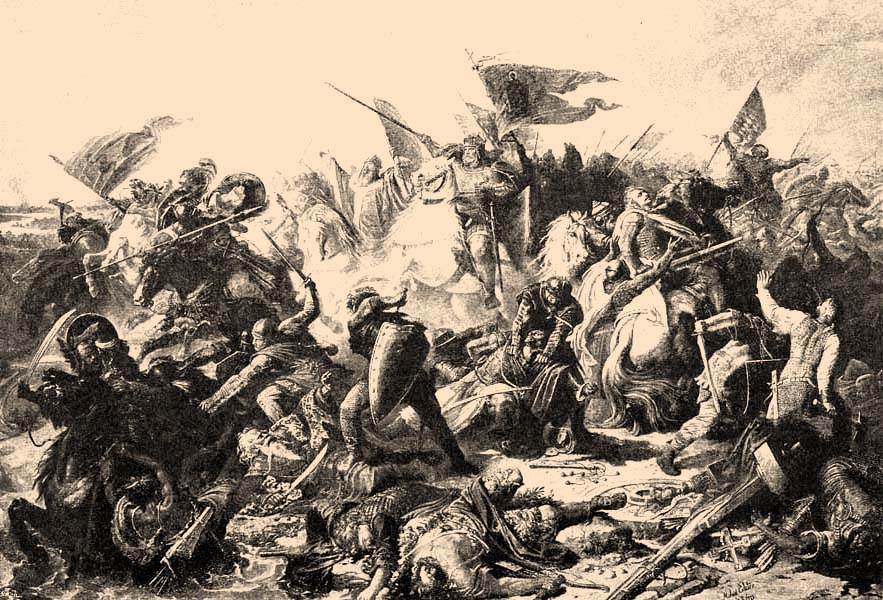
Battle of Bratislava in 907

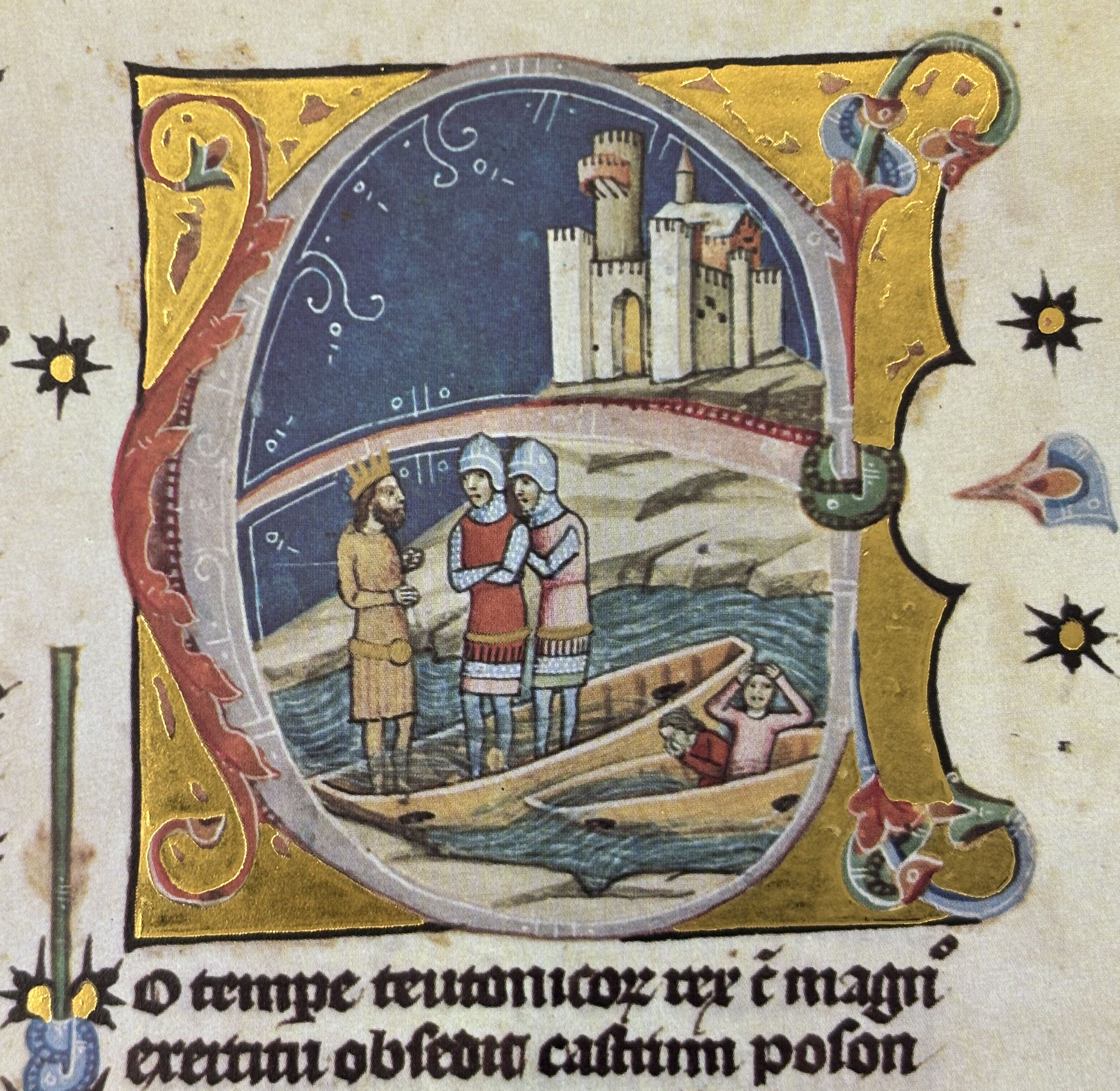
The earliest known depiction of Pressburg Castle, the failed German siege in 1052 (Illuminated Chronicle, 1358)

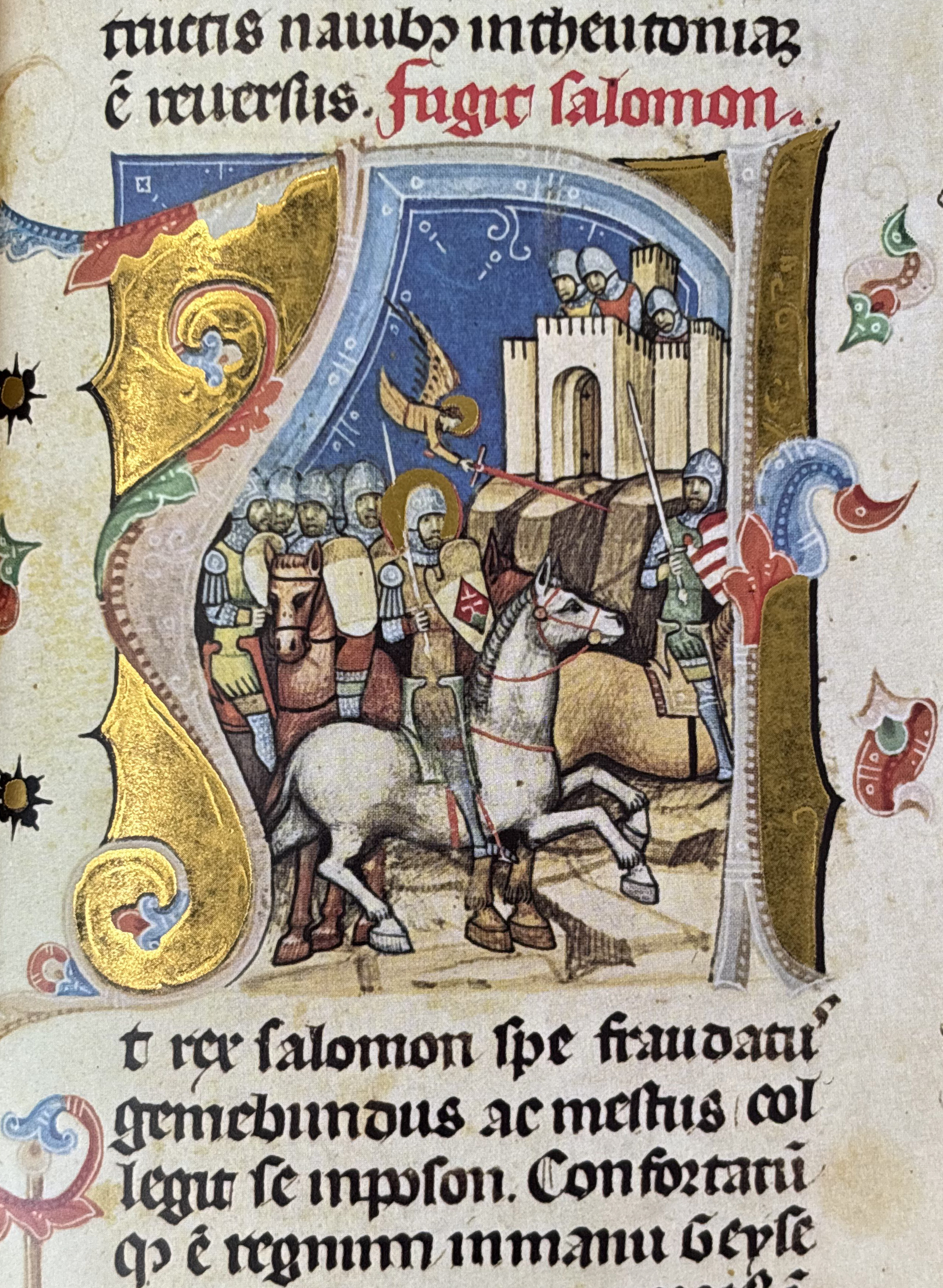
Escape of King Solomon of Hungary from King Géza I of Hungary and Prince Ladislaus in 1070s (Illuminated Chronicle, 1358)

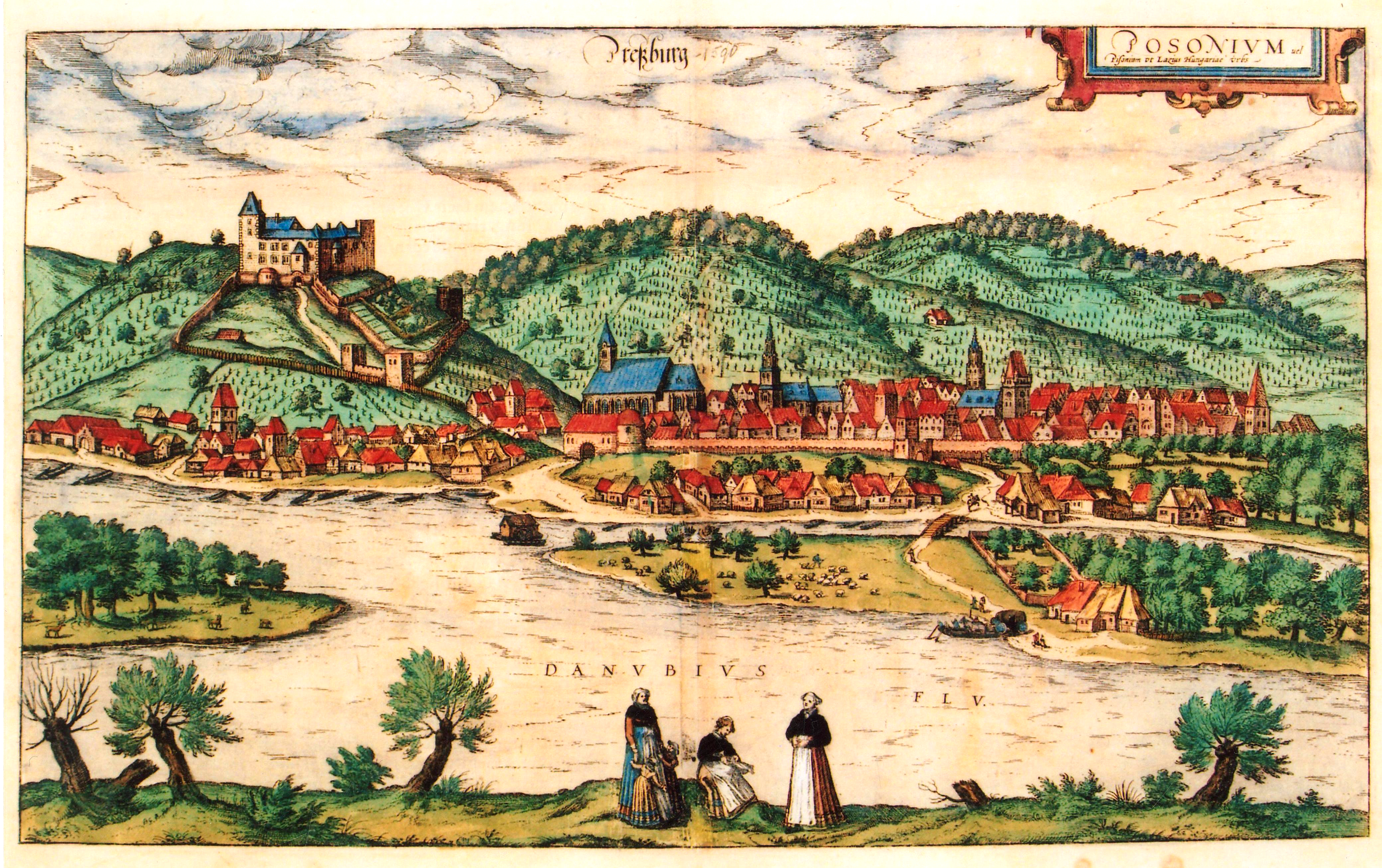
Pressburg (Bratislava) in 1588

The 17th century was marked by anti-Habsburg uprisings, fighting with the Ottomans, floods, plagues, and other disasters, which diminished the population. Great epidemics were spreading in Bratislava in 1541–1542, 1552–1553, 1660–1665, and 1678–1681. A terrible outbreak of 1678–1681 left approximately 11,000 casualties among Bratislava's residents (the city population was in that time around 30,000 people). The last plague outbreak of Bratislava was between the years 1712–1713.

Pressburg flourished during the 18th-century reign of Queen Maria Theresa, becoming the largest and most important town in the Kingdom of Hungary. The population tripled; many new palaces, monasteries, mansions, and streets were built, and the city was the centre of social and cultural life of the region. Wolfgang Amadeus Mozart gave a concert in 1762 in the Pálffy Palace. Joseph Haydn performed in 1784 in the Grassalkovich Palace. Ludwig van Beethoven was a guest in 1796 in the Keglevich Palace.

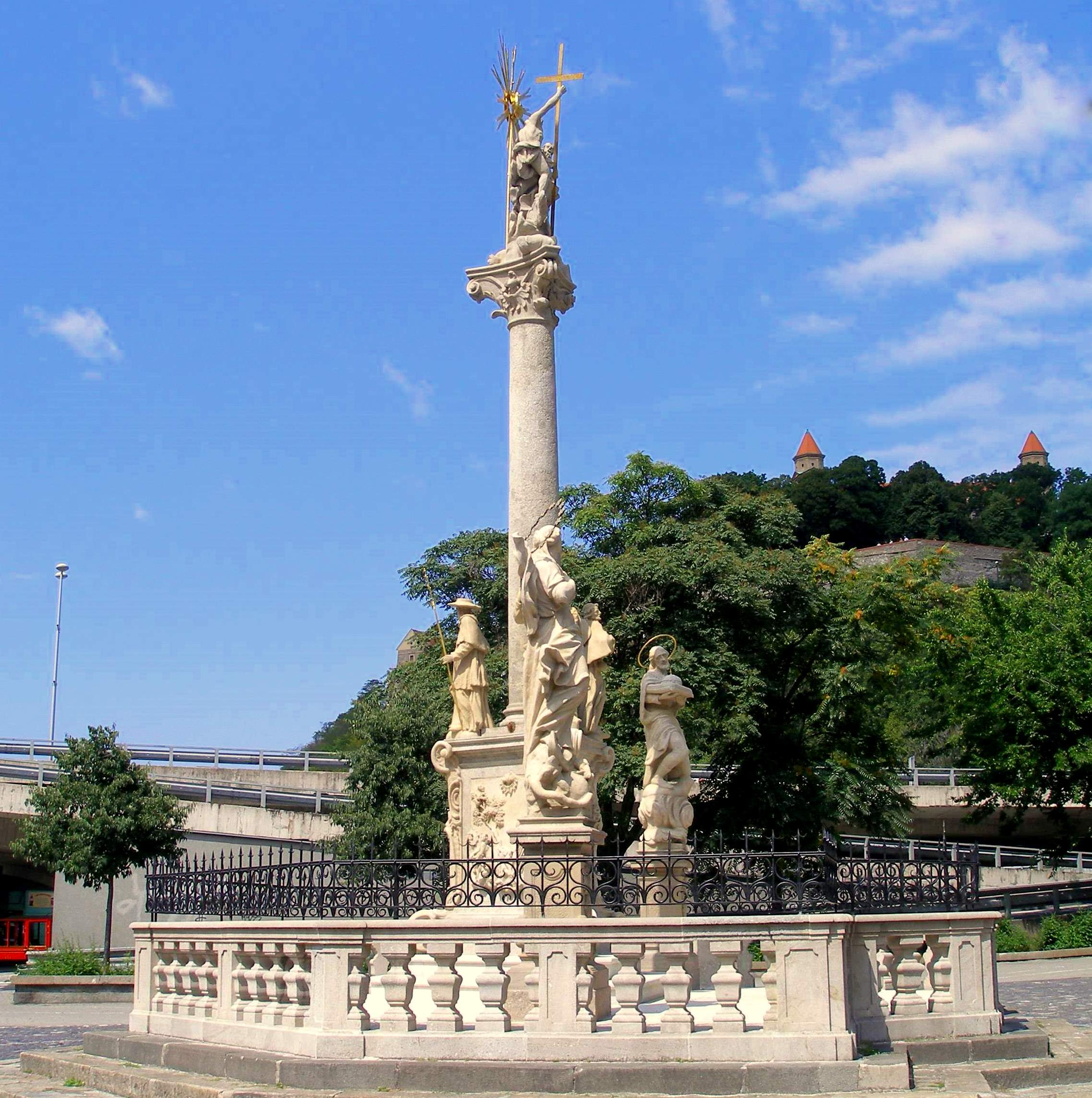
The Plague Column, built in 1713

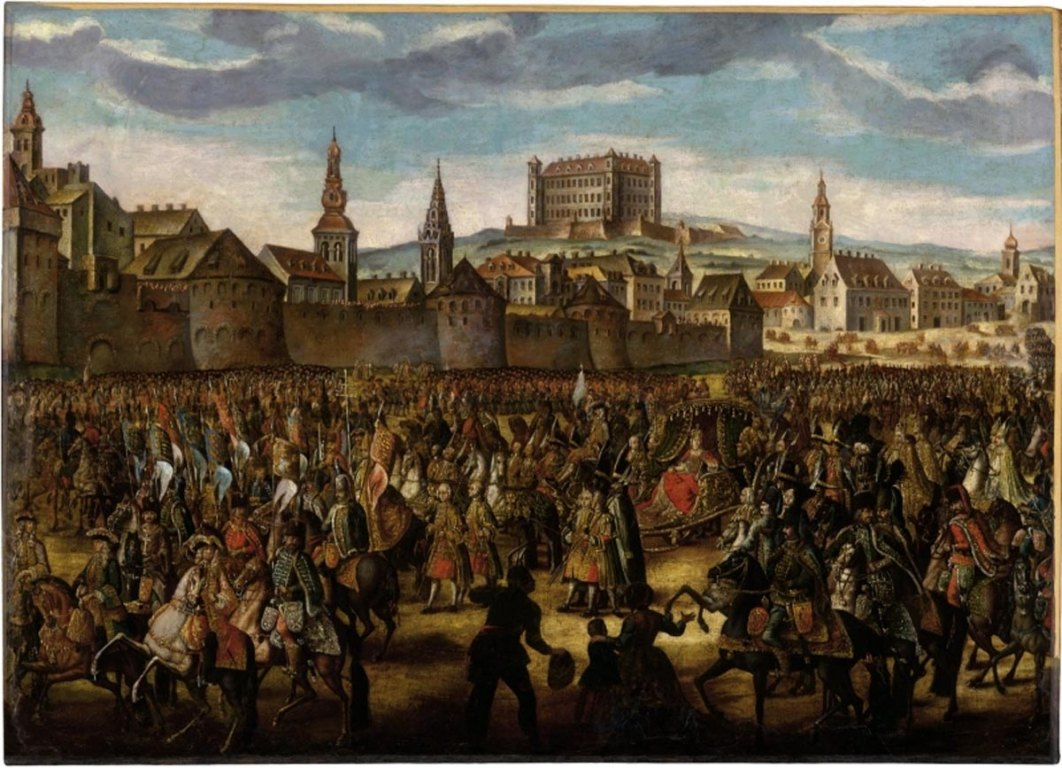
Coronation of Maria Theresa in 1741

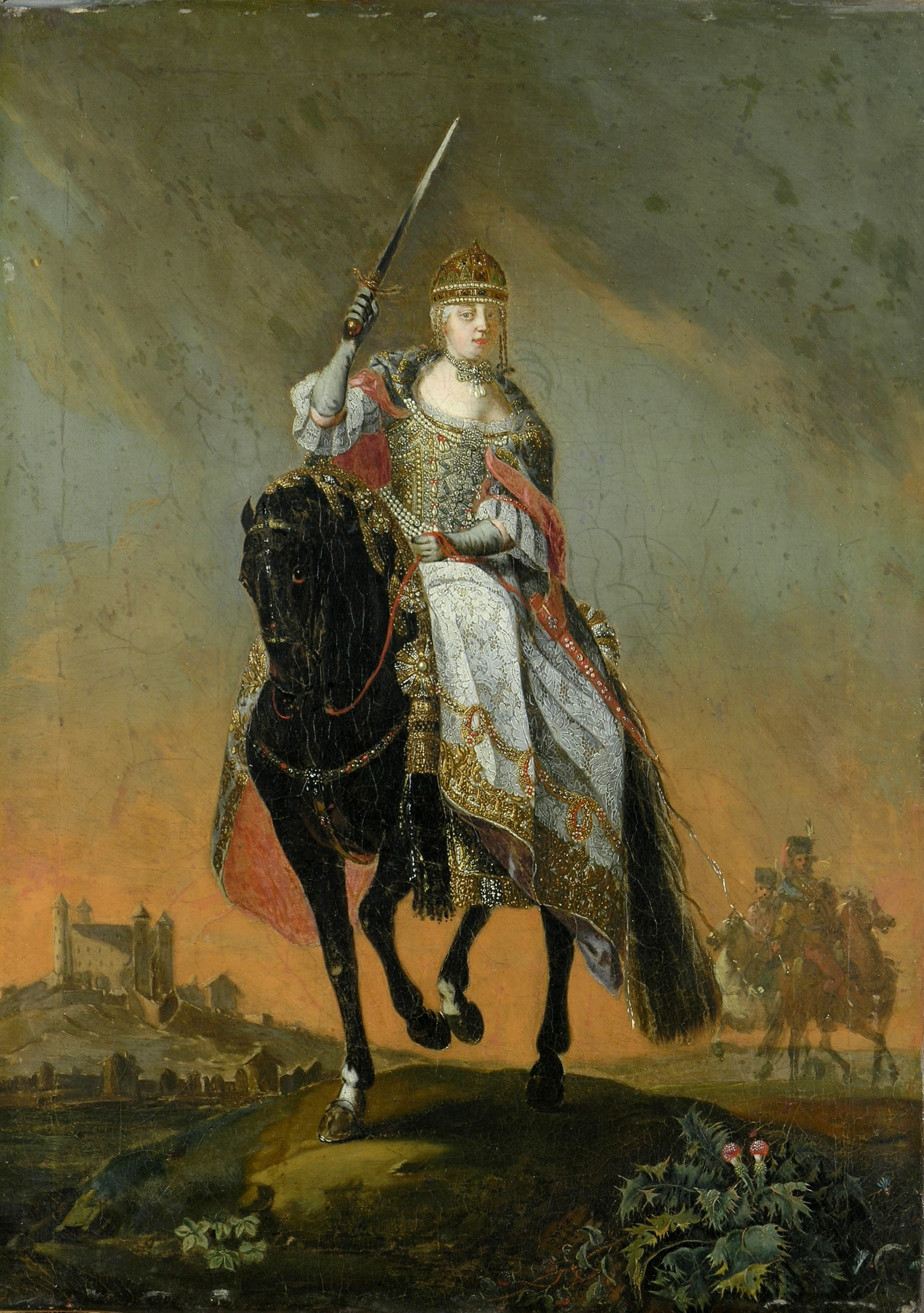
Maria Theresa's ride in Bratislava, 1747

The city started to lose its importance under the reign of Maria Theresa's son Joseph II, especially after the crown jewels were taken to Vienna in 1783 in an attempt to strengthen the relations between Austria and Hungary. Many central offices subsequently moved to Buda, followed by a large segment of the nobility. The first newspapers in Hungarian and Slovak were published here: Magyar hírmondó in 1780, and Presspurske Nowiny in 1783. In the course of the 18th century, the city became a centre for the Slovak national movement.

The city's 19th-century history was closely tied to the major events in Europe. The Peace of Pressburg between the Austrian Empire and French Empire was signed here in 1805. Devín Castle was ruined by Napoleon's French troops during an invasion of 1809. In 1825, the Hungarian National Learned Society (the present Hungarian Academy of Sciences) was founded in Pressburg using a donation from István Széchenyi. In 1843, Hungarian was proclaimed the official language in legislation, public administration, and education by the Diet in the city.

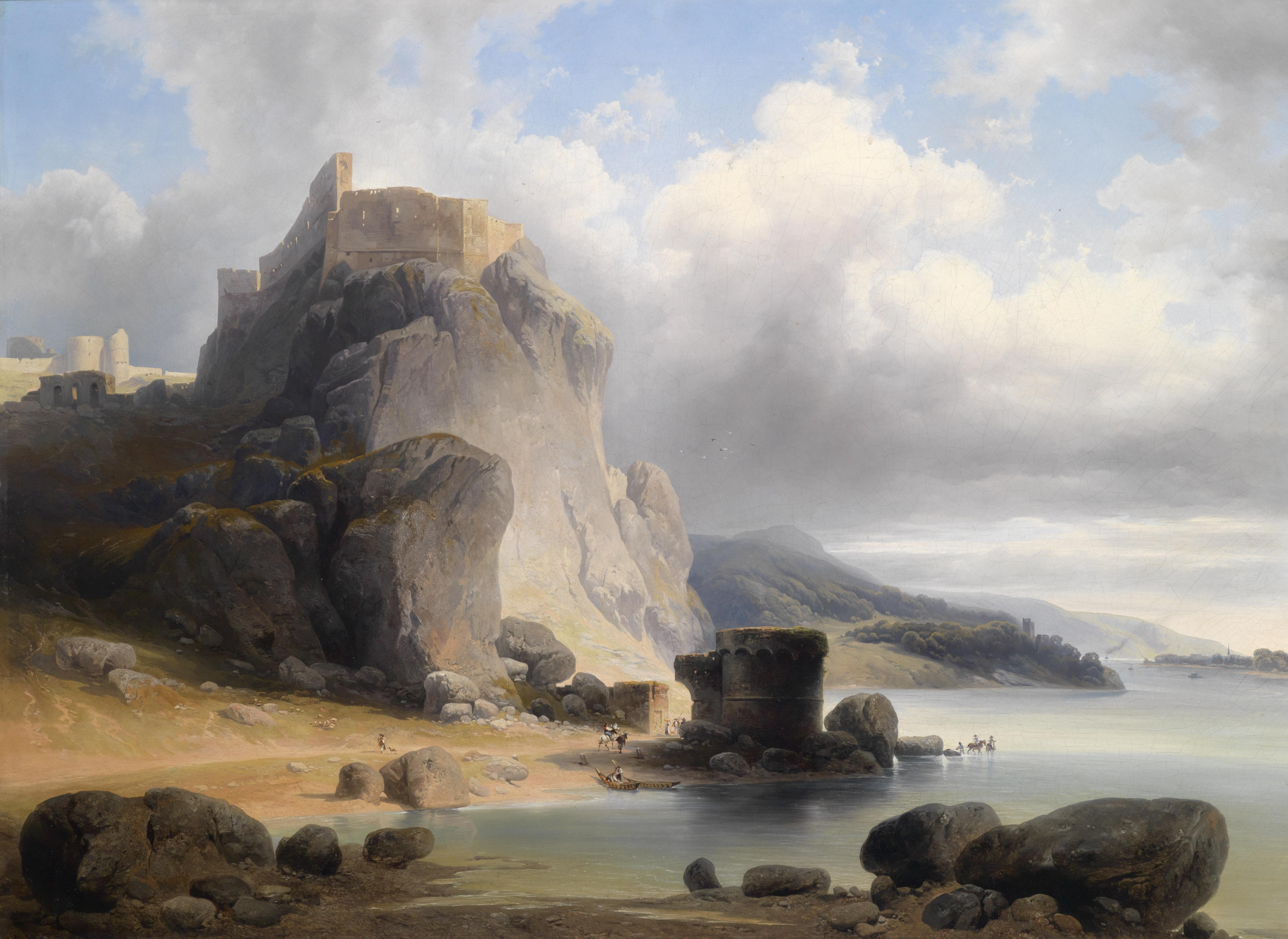
Devín Castle, turned to ruins by Napoleon Bonaparte's French army in 1809.

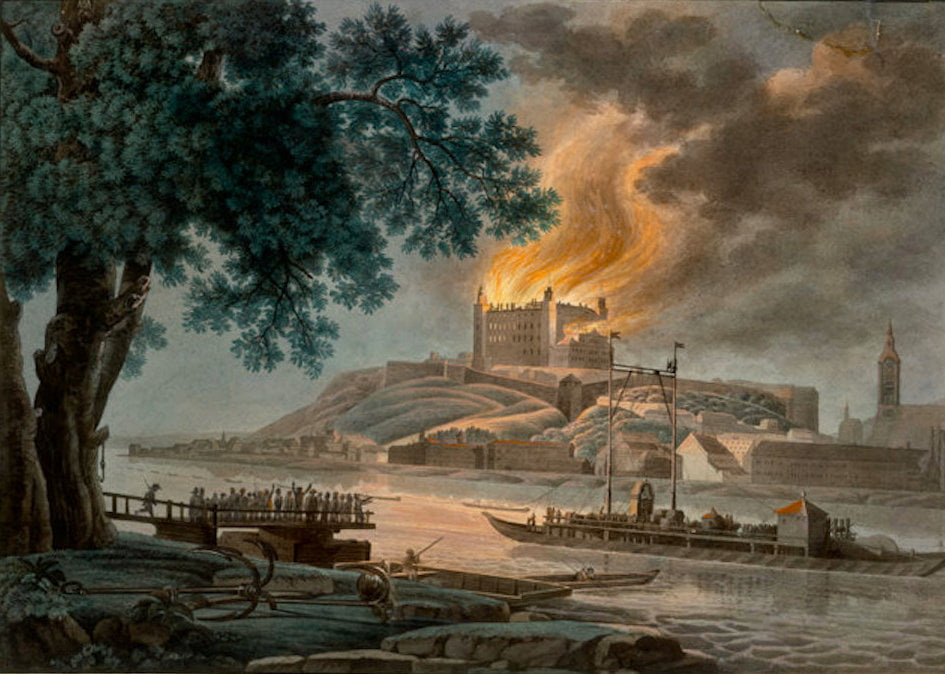
In 1811, a huge fire raged through Bratislava Castle, destroying the main palace and more than 70 nearby houses.

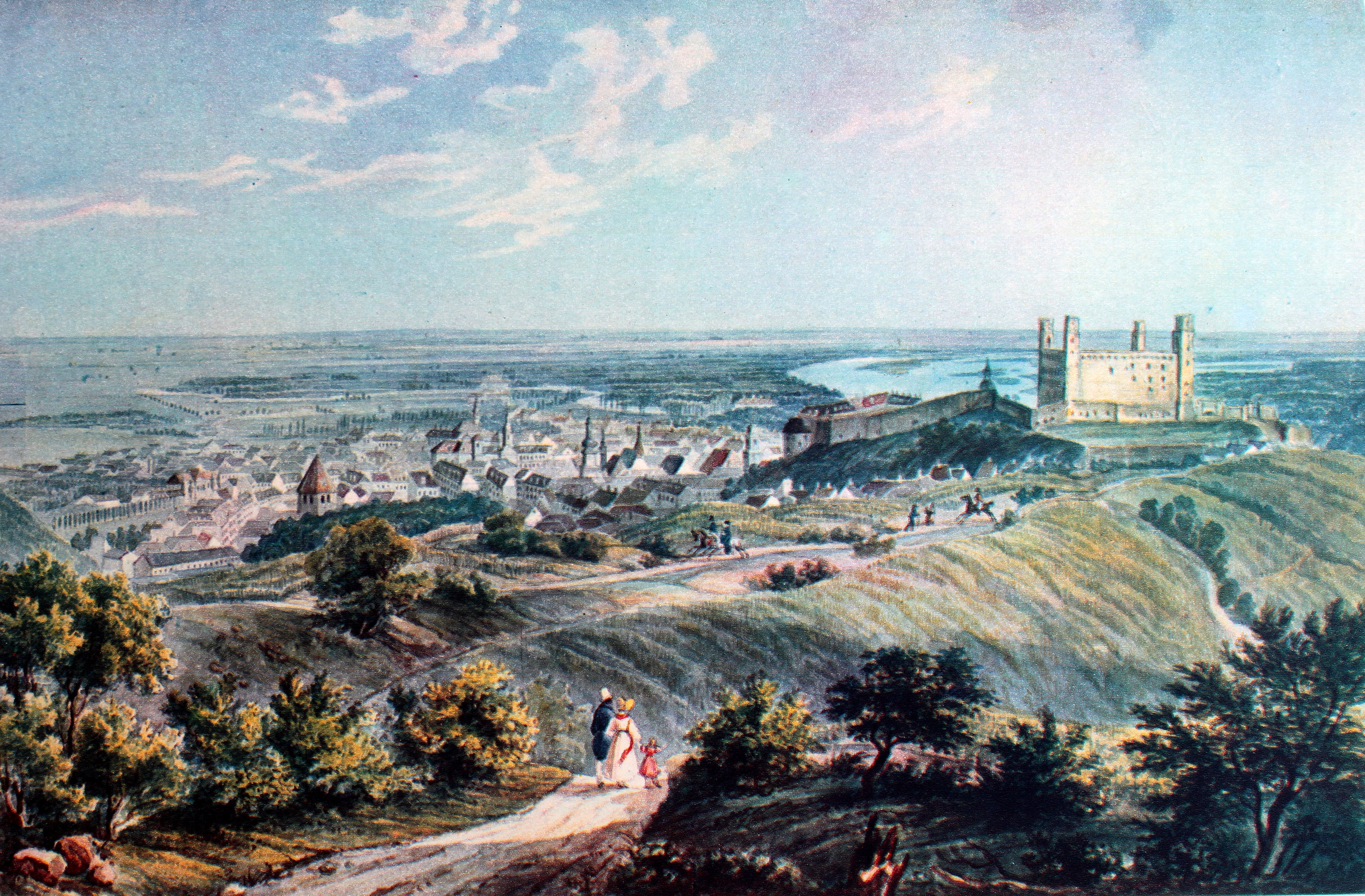
Pressburg (Bratislava) in the 19th century

As a reaction to the Revolutions of 1848, Ferdinand V signed the so-called April laws, which included the abolition of serfdom, at the Primate's Palace. The city chose the revolutionary Hungarian side, but was captured by the Austrians in December 1848.

Industry developed rapidly in the 19th century. The first horse-drawn railway in the Kingdom of Hungary, from Pressburg to Szentgyörgy (Svätý Jur), was built in 1840. A new line to Vienna using steam locomotives was opened in 1848, and a line to Pest in 1850. Many new industrial, financial, and other institutions were founded; for example, the first bank in present-day Slovakia was founded in 1842. The city's first permanent bridge over the Danube, Starý most (Old Bridge), was built in 1891. Between the years 1867–1918, the territory of Pressburg became part of Austro-Hungarian Empire.

Before World War I, the city had a population that was 42% German, 41% Hungarian, and 15% Slovak (1910 census). The first post-war census in 1919 declared the city's ethnic composition at 36% German, 33% Slovak, and 29% Hungarian, but this may have reflected changing self-identification, rather than an exchange of peoples. Many people were bi- or trilingual and multicultural.

After World War I, the dissolution of the Austro-Hungarian Empire began. U.S. President Woodrow Wilson and the United States played a major role in the establishment of the new Czechoslovak state. American Slovaks proposed renaming the city "Wilsonovo mesto" (Wilson City), after Woodrow Wilson.

On 28 October 1918, Czechoslovakia was proclaimed, but its borders were not settled for several months. The dominant Hungarian and German population tried to prevent annexation of the city to Czechoslovakia and declared it a free city, while the Hungarian Prime Minister Károlyi protested against the Czech invasion. The Slovak National Assembly, meanwhile, called it a "defensive action of the Slovaks themselves, to end the anarchy caused by the flight of the Hungarians." The Allies of World War I drew a provisional demarcation line, which was revealed to the Hungarian government on 23 December, in the document known as the Vix Note. The Czechoslovak Legion arrived from Italy, began to advance on 30 December 1918, and by 2 January 1919, all important civil and military buildings were in Czechoslovak hands. It was the beginning of the conflict, which later continued as the Hungarian–Czechoslovak War. The city became the seat of Slovakia's political organs and organizations and became Slovakia's capital on 4 February.

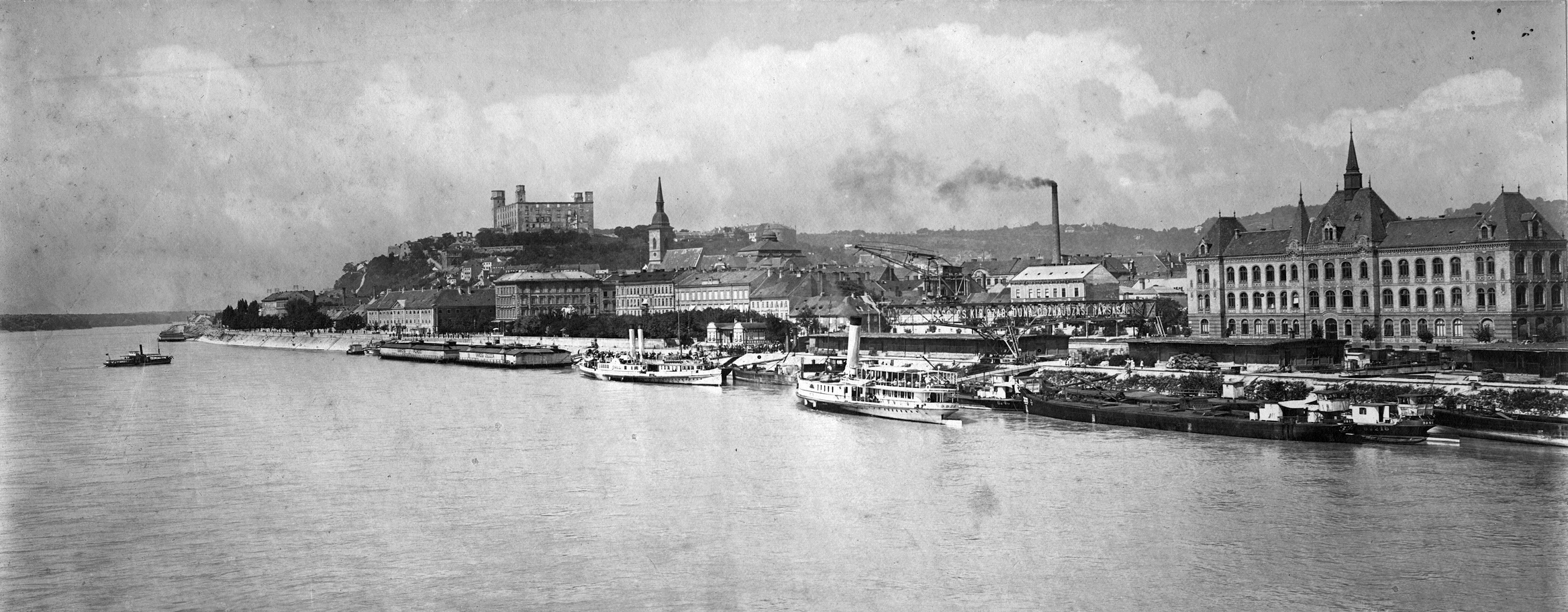
Pressburg (Bratislava) in 1915 during World War I

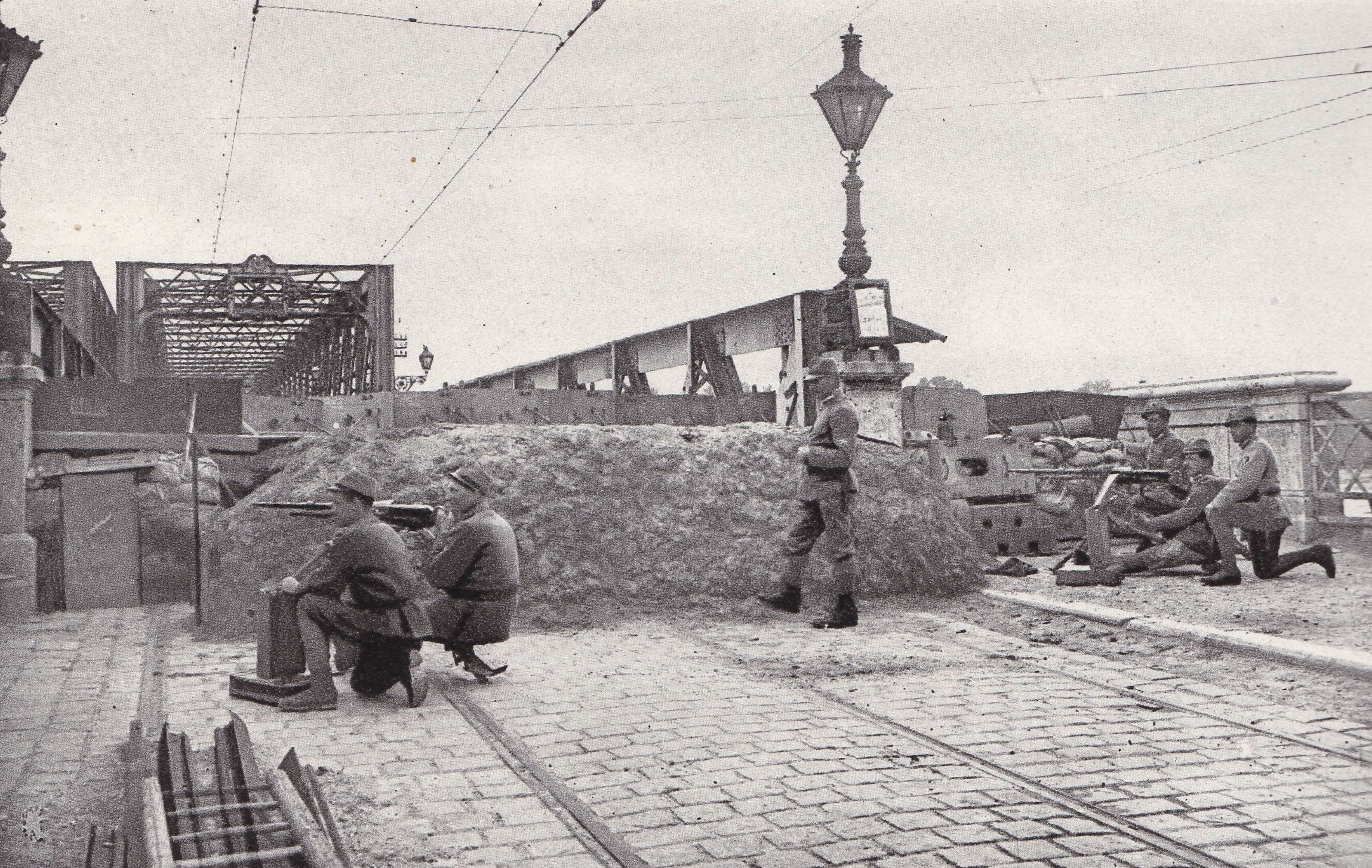
Czechoslovak Legion at the Old Bridge (Starý most) in Bratislava during Hungarian–Czechoslovak War, 1919

On 27 March 1919, the name Bratislava was officially adopted for the first time to replace the previous Slovak name Prešporok.

At the beginning of August 1919, Czechoslovakia got permission to correct the borders for strategic reasons, mainly to secure the port and to prevent a potential attack of the Hungarian Army on the town. On the night of 14 August 1919, barefoot Czechoslovak soldiers silently climbed to the Hungarian side of the Starý most (Old Bridge), captured the guards, and annexed Petržalka (currently part of Bratislava's 5th district) without a fight. The Paris Peace Conference assigned the area to Czechoslovakia to create a bridgehead for the newly created Czechoslovak state for controlling the Danube.

Left without any protection after the retreat of the Hungarian army, many Hungarians were expelled or fled. Czechs and Slovaks moved their households to Bratislava. Education in Hungarian and German was radically reduced in the city. In 1918-1919 around 20,000 Czechoslovak officers moved to Bratislava; 15,000 of them were from Prague. By the 1930 Czechoslovak census, the Hungarian population of Bratislava had decreased to 15.8% (see the Demographics of Bratislava article for more details).

In 1938, Nazi Germany annexed neighbouring Austria in the Anschluss; on 10 October 1938, based on the Munich Agreement it also annexed (still-separate from Bratislava) Petržalka and Devín boroughs on ethnic grounds, as these had many ethnic Germans. Petržalka was renamed as Engerau and Devín was renamed as Theben an der March. The Starý most (Old Bridge) became a border bridge between Czechoslovakia and Nazi Germany.

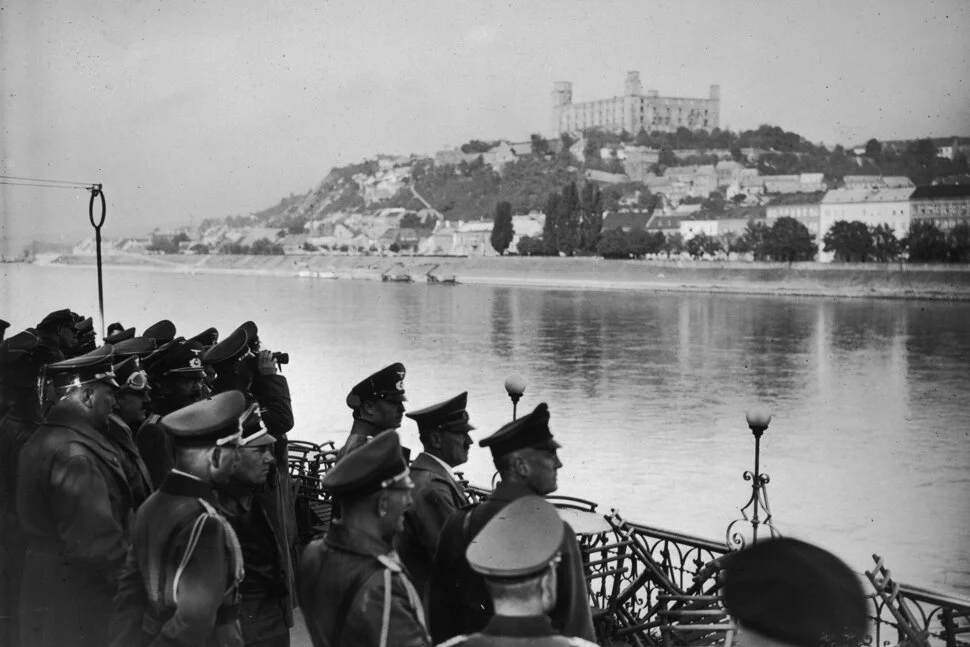
German Führer Adolf Hitler on his visit to Bratislava after Munich Betrayal, October 1938

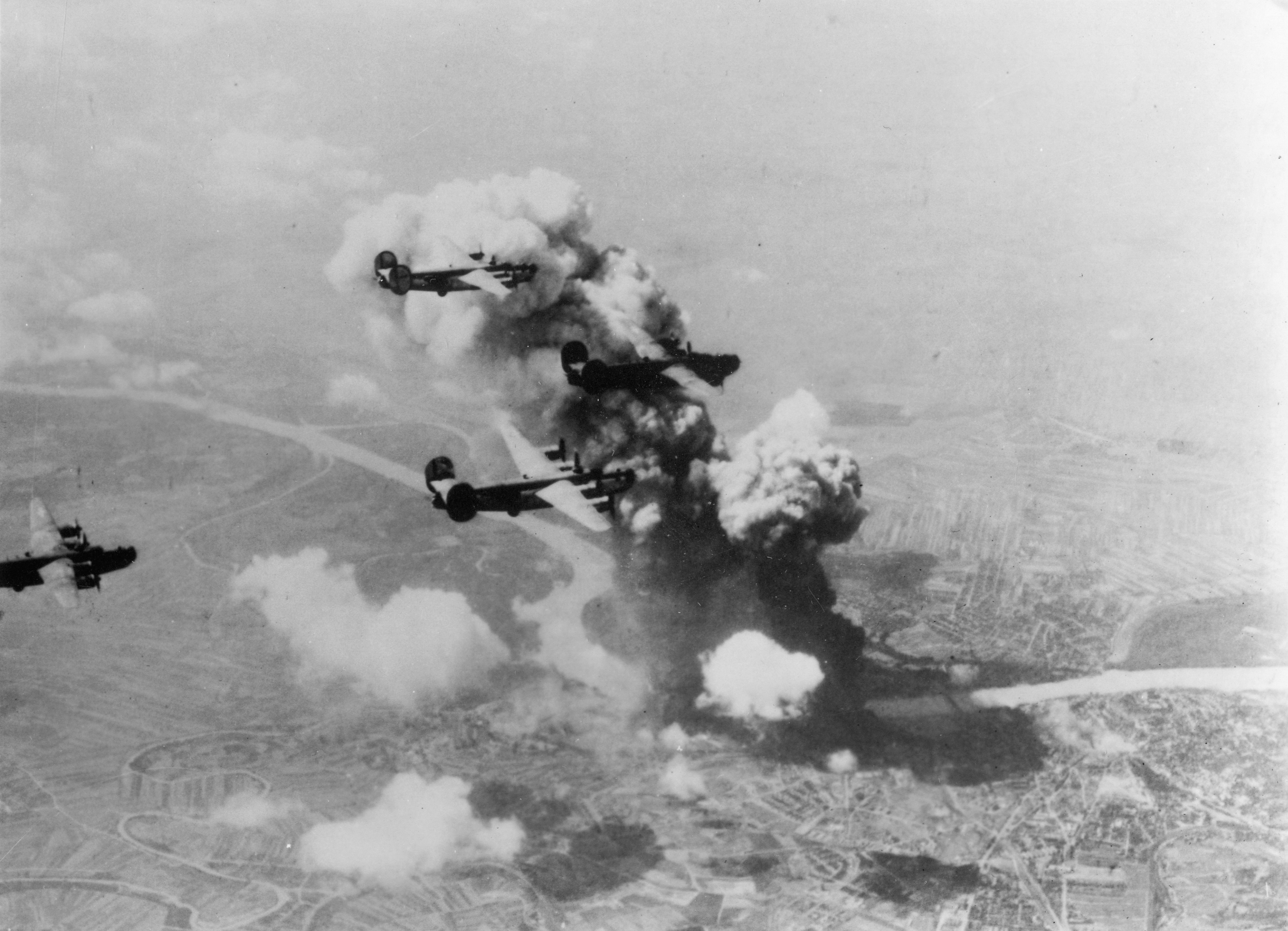
Bombing of Bratislava by the United States Army Air Forces, during the Nazi occupation in 1944.

Bratislava was declared the capital of the first independent Slovak Republic on 14 March 1939, but the new state quickly fell under Nazi influence. In 1941–1942 and 1944–1945, the new Slovak government cooperated in deporting most of Bratislava's approximately 15,000 Jews; they were transported to concentration camps, where most were killed or died before the end of the war in the Holocaust.

Bratislava, occupied by German troops, was many times bombarded by the Allies. Major air raids included the bombing of Bratislava and its refinery Apollo on June 16, 1944, by American B-24 bombers of the Fifteenth Air Force with 181 victims. The Bombardment group attacked in four waves with overall 158 planes. On April 4, 1945, Bratislava was liberated by the Soviet Red Army 2nd Ukrainian Front during the Bratislava–Brno offensive. The Czechoslovak government and president Edvard Beneš then moved to Bratislava on May 8.

At the end of World War II, most of Bratislava's ethnic Germans were evacuated by the German authorities. A few returned after the war, but were soon expelled without their properties under the Beneš decrees, part of a widespread expulsion of ethnic Germans from eastern Europe.

After World War II, Slovak Republic lost its so-called independence and was reunified again with the Czech Republic as Czechoslovak Republic. Engerau (currently part of Bratislava's 5th district) and Theben an der March (currently part of Bratislava's 4th district) were returned to Czechoslovakia and renamed back to Petržalka and Devín. Furthermore, after signing the Peace Treaty of Paris on 10 February 1947, three Hungarian villages, namely Horvátjárfalu (Jarovce), Oroszvár (Rusovce), and Dunacsún (Čunovo) situated south of Bratislava were transferred to Czechoslovakia, to form the so-called "Bratislava bridgehead" (currently all three of them are part of Bratislava's 5th district).

After the Communist Party seized power in Czechoslovakia in February 1948, the city became part of the Eastern Bloc. The city annexed new land, and the population rose significantly, becoming 90% Slovak.

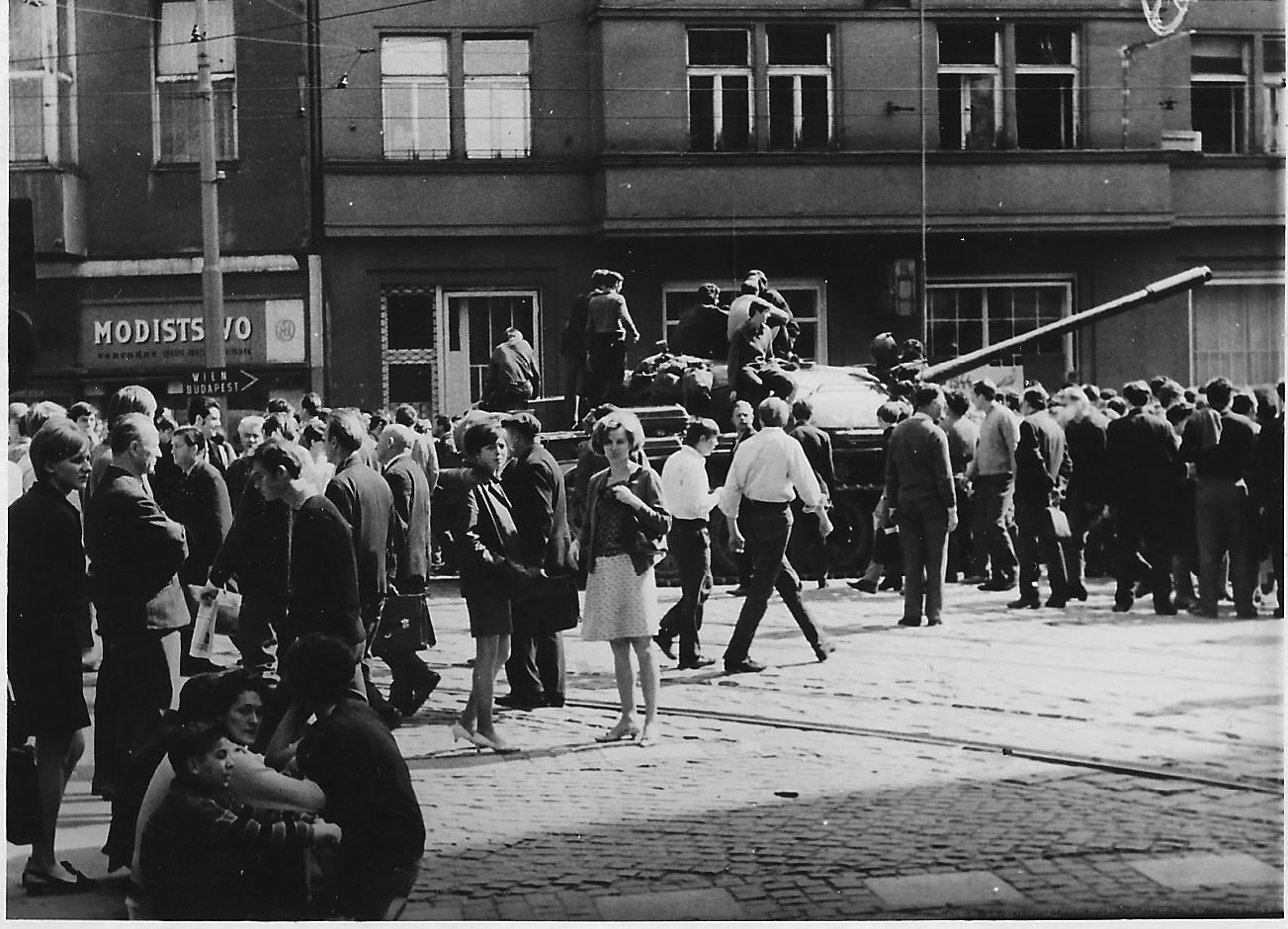
Soviet tank in Bratislava during the Warsaw Pact invasion of Czechoslovakia in 1968

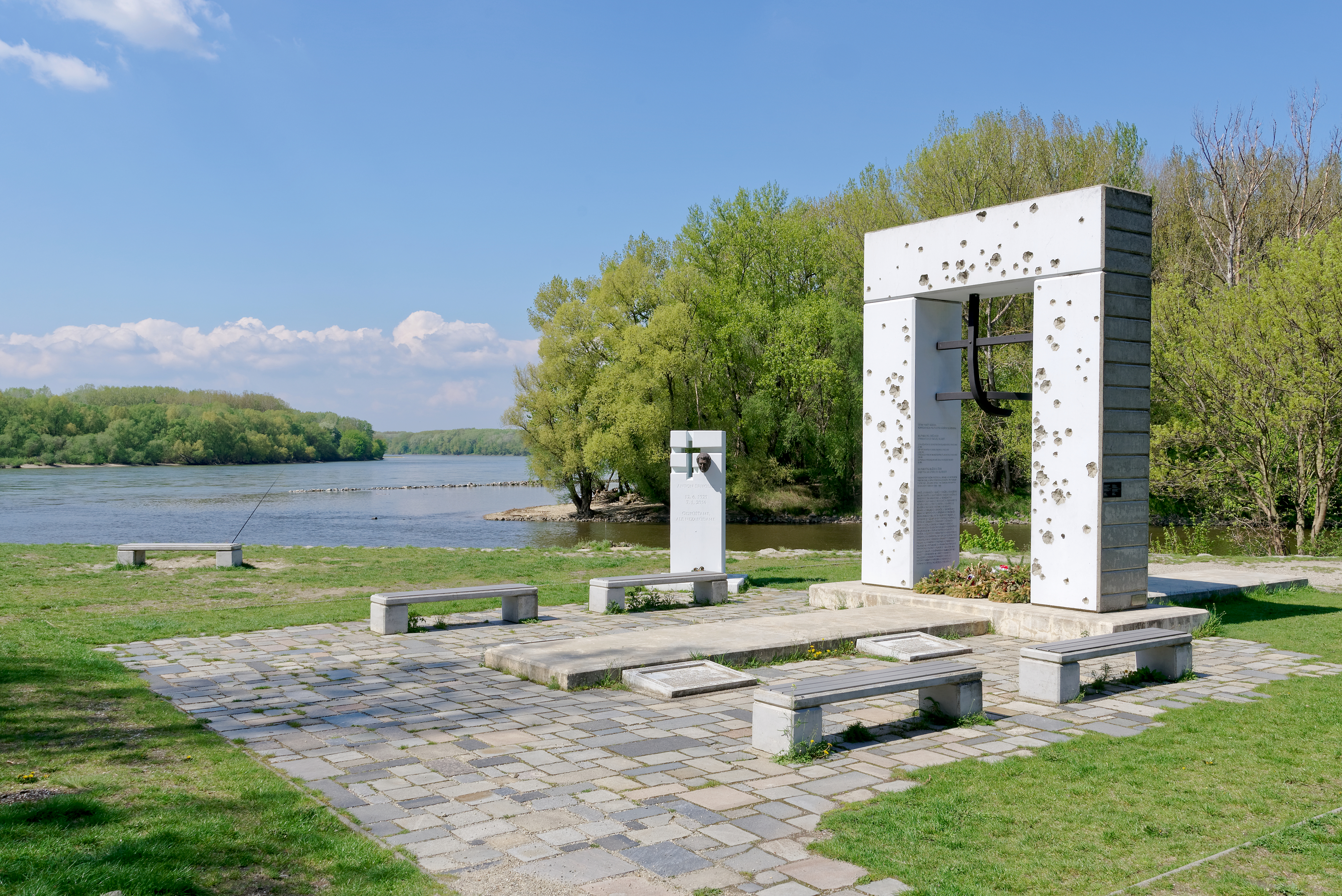
Iron Curtain memorial in Bratislava, 400 people were killed trying to cross the border into the West during the communist era.

Large residential areas consisting of high-rise prefabricated panel buildings, such as those in the Petržalka or Dúbravka borough, were built. The Communist government also built several new grandiose buildings, such as the Slovak Radio Building, Slavín, or Kamzík TV Tower. A quarter of Bratislava's Old Town was demolished in the late 1960s for a single project: the bridge of the Slovak National Uprising. To make space for this development, much of the city's centuries-old, historical Jewish quarter was razed, including the 19th-century Moorish-style Neolog Synagogue.

In 1968, after the unsuccessful Czechoslovak attempt to liberalise the Communist regime, the city was occupied by Warsaw Pact troops. Shortly thereafter, it became the capital of the Slovak Socialist Republic, one of the two states of the federalised Czechoslovakia.

Bratislava's dissidents anticipated the fall of Communism with the Bratislava candle demonstration in 1988, and the city became one of the foremost centres of the anti-Communist Velvet Revolution in 1989.

The end of Communist rule in Czechoslovakia in 1989 was followed once again by the country's dissolution, this time into two successor states. Czechoslovak Socialist Republic renamed as Czech and Slovak Federative Republic, the word "socialist" was dropped in the names of the two republics within the federation, the Slovak Socialist Republic renamed as the Slovak Republic.

In 1993, Bratislava once again became the capital of the newly formed independent Slovak Republic, following the Velvet Divorce.

== Geography ==
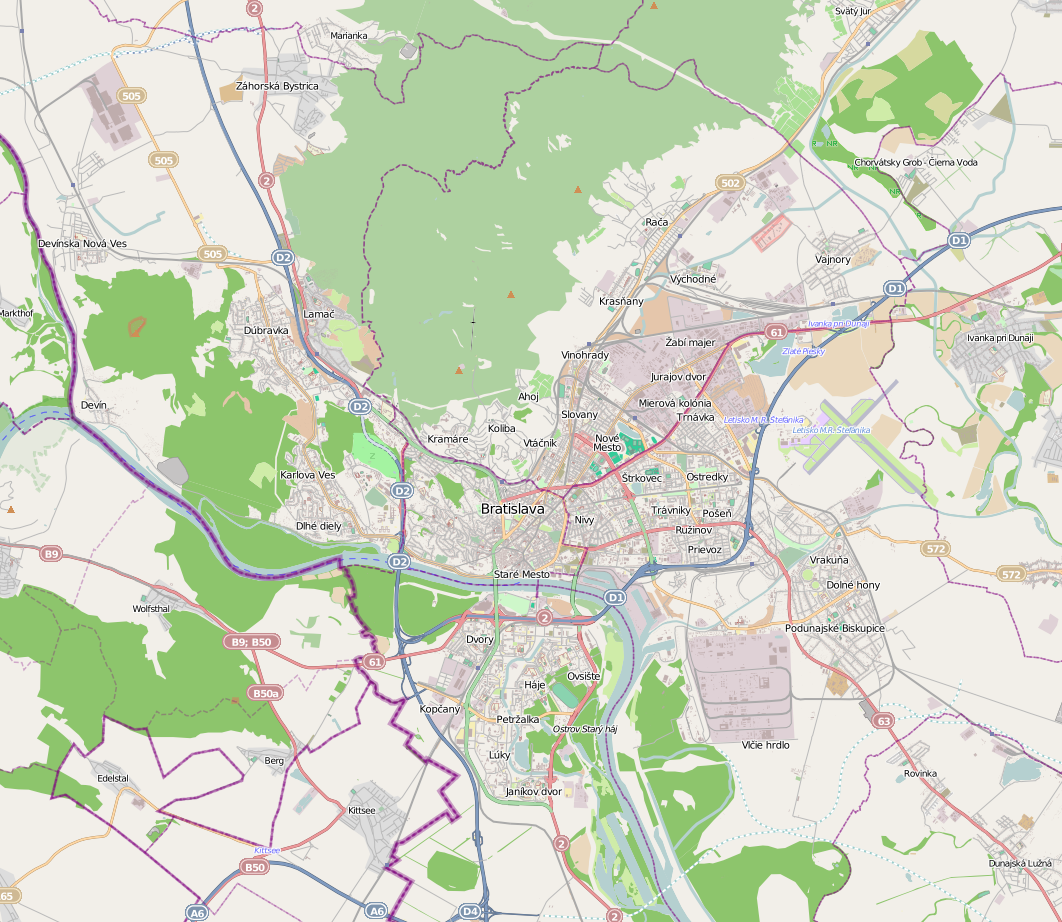
Map of Bratislava

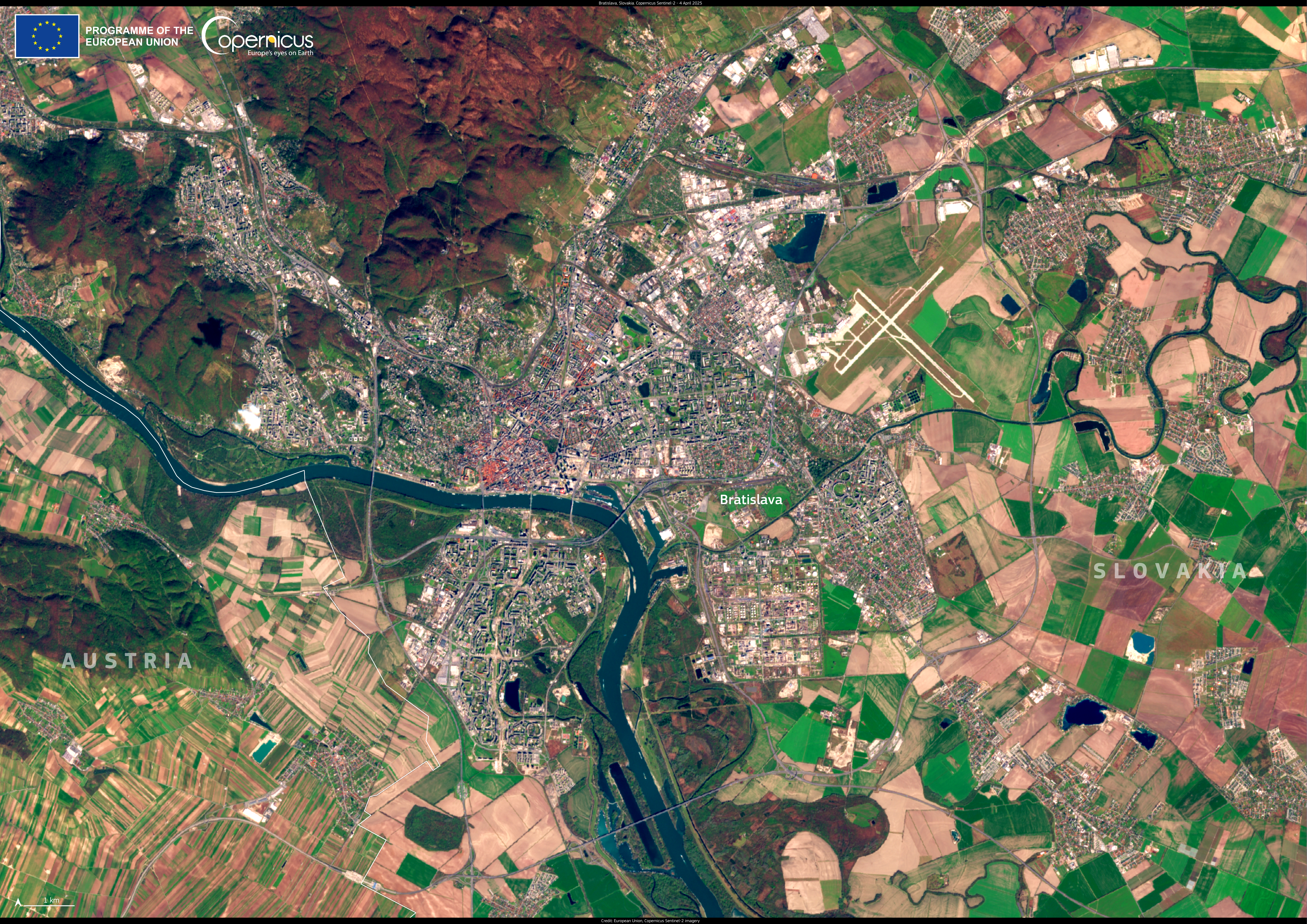
Satellite view of Bratislava

Bratislava is situated in southwestern Slovakia, within the Bratislava Region. Its location on the borders with Austria and Hungary makes it the only national capital that borders two countries. It is only 18 kilometres (11.2 mi) from the border with Hungary and only 60 kilometres (37.3 mi) from the Austrian capital Vienna.

The city has a total area of 367.66 square kilometres (142.0 sq mi), making it the second-largest city in Slovakia by area (after the township of Vysoké Tatry). Bratislava straddles the Danube, along which it had developed and for centuries the chief transportation route to other areas. The river passes through the city from the west to the southeast. The Middle Danube basin begins at Devín Gate in western Bratislava. Other rivers are the Morava River, which forms the northwestern border of the city and enters the Danube at Devín, the Little Danube, and the Vydrica, which enters the Danube in the borough of Karlova Ves.

The Carpathian mountain range begins in city territory with the Little Carpathians (Malé Karpaty). The Záhorie and Danubian lowlands stretch into Bratislava. The city's lowest point is at the Danube's surface at 126 metres (413 ft) above mean sea level, and the highest point is Devínska Kobyla at 514 metres (1,686 ft). The average altitude is 140 metres (460 ft).

=== Climate ===
Bratislava has recently shifted into the humid subtropical climate under Köppen–Geiger climate classification (Cfa), closely bordering on Dfa, and is classified as temperate oceanic climate under Trewartha climate classification (Doak), It is in USDA Plant Hardiness Zone 7b with a mean annual temperature of around 11.1 °C (52.0 °F), an average temperature of 22.0 °C (71.6 °F) in the warmest month and 0.3 °C (32.5 °F) in the coldest month, four distinct seasons and precipitation spread rather evenly throughout the year. It is often windy with a marked variation between hot summers and cold, humid winters. There can also sometimes be a significant difference in the weather between the parts of the city. Bratislava, just like any other city, has an urban heat island effect, but there is no weather station directly in the urban core, so the temperature there can be slightly higher than the official weather station reports. The city is in one of the warmest and driest parts of Slovakia.

Recently, the transitions from winter to summer and summer to winter have been rapid, with short autumn and spring periods. Snow occurs less frequently than previously. The record high temperature is 39.9 °C (103.8 °F) recorded on 3 August 2026, while the record low temperature is −24.6 °C (−12.3 °F) recorded on 29 January 2002 and 22 February 2016. Some areas, particularly Devín and Devínska Nová Ves, are vulnerable to floods from the rivers Danube and Morava. New flood protection has been built on both banks.

Climate data for Bratislava Airport (1991–2020 normals, extremes 1951–present)
Month	Jan	Feb	Mar	Apr	May	Jun	Jul	Aug	Sep	Oct	Nov	Dec	Year
Record high °C (°F)	19.8 (67.6)	19.7 (67.5)	25.0 (77.0)	30.3 (86.5)	33.4 (92.1)	36.3 (97.3)	38.2 (100.8)	39.9 (103.8)	34.0 (93.2)	28.0 (82.4)	21.6 (70.9)	17.9 (64.2)	39.9 (103.8)
Mean daily maximum °C (°F)	3.1 (37.6)	5.8 (42.4)	11.1 (52.0)	17.5 (63.5)	21.7 (71.1)	25.6 (78.1)	28.0 (82.4)	27.9 (82.2)	21.9 (71.4)	15.6 (60.1)	9.3 (48.7)	3.7 (38.7)	15.9 (60.6)
Daily mean °C (°F)	0.3 (32.5)	1.9 (35.4)	6.1 (43.0)	11.7 (53.1)	16.2 (61.2)	20.2 (68.4)	22.0 (71.6)	21.5 (70.7)	16.2 (61.2)	10.7 (51.3)	5.7 (42.3)	1.1 (34.0)	11.1 (52.0)
Mean daily minimum °C (°F)	−2.8 (27.0)	−1.7 (28.9)	1.7 (35.1)	5.7 (42.3)	10.6 (51.1)	14.2 (57.6)	16.2 (61.2)	15.9 (60.6)	11.2 (52.2)	6.3 (43.3)	2.6 (36.7)	−1.5 (29.3)	6.5 (43.7)
Record low °C (°F)	−24.6 (−12.3)	−24.6 (−12.3)	−16.4 (2.5)	−5.0 (23.0)	−1.6 (29.1)	2.7 (36.9)	4.4 (39.9)	4.8 (40.6)	−1.7 (28.9)	−7.6 (18.3)	−12.5 (9.5)	−20.3 (−4.5)	−24.6 (−12.3)
Average precipitation mm (inches)	37.4 (1.47)	32.9 (1.30)	36.8 (1.45)	35.9 (1.41)	58.6 (2.31)	59.2 (2.33)	61.8 (2.43)	60.5 (2.38)	58.6 (2.31)	43.6 (1.72)	46.2 (1.82)	42.7 (1.68)	574.3 (22.61)
Average precipitation days (≥ 1.0 mm)	13.2	11.4	11.7	9.2	11.3	10.9	11.5	10.0	9.6	11.2	12.5	13.6	136.1
Average snowy days	10.7	7.6	1.6	0.1	0.0	0.0	0.0	0.0	0.0	0.0	1.5	6.9	28.6
Average relative humidity (%)	80.9	74.7	67.5	61.0	62.8	62.0	60.5	62.3	69.2	76.8	81.9	83.2	70.2
Mean monthly sunshine hours	65.5	99.3	153.7	218.6	258.1	269.4	286.5	273.3	194.5	134.6	69.5	51.9	2,074.9
Source 1: World Meteorological Organisation
Source 2: SHMI (extremes, 1951–present)

== Cityscape and architecture ==
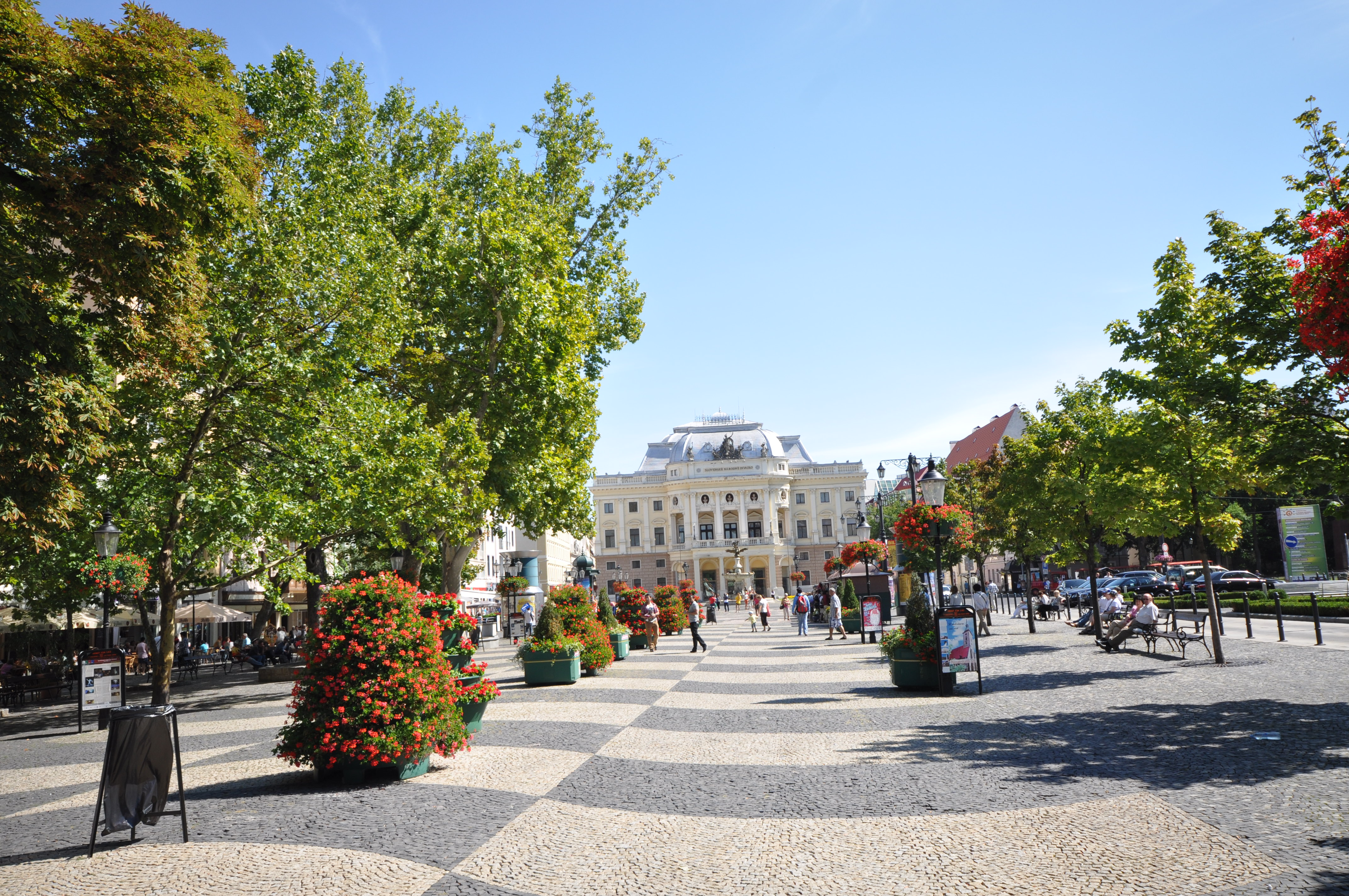
Hviezdoslav Square

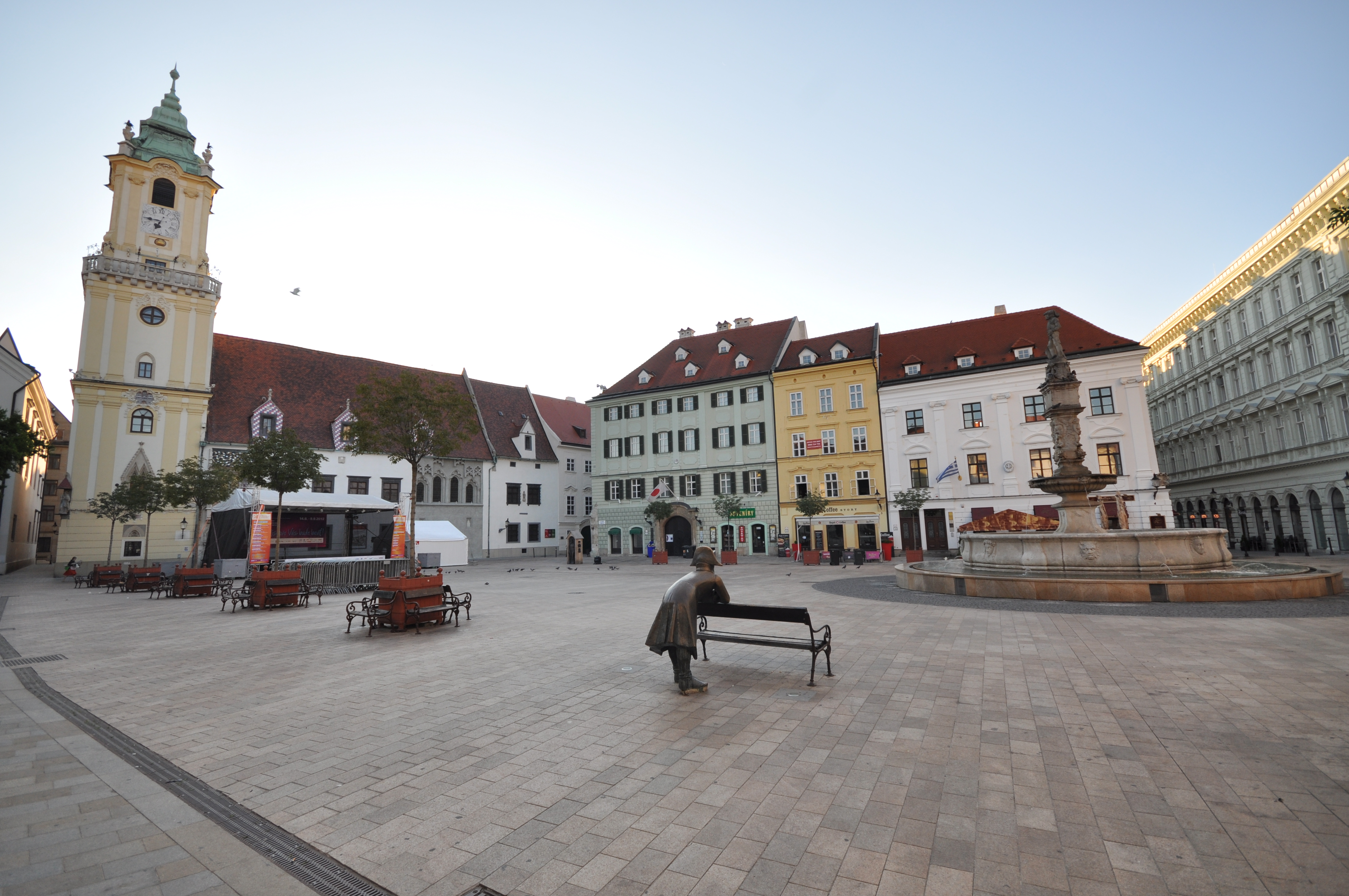
Main Square

The cityscape of Bratislava is characterized by medieval towers and grandiose 20th-century buildings, but it underwent profound changes in a construction boom at the start of the 21st century.

Most historical buildings are concentrated in the Old Town. Bratislava's Town Hall is a complex of three buildings erected in the 14th–15th centuries and now hosts the Bratislava City Museum. Michael's Gate is the only gate that has been preserved from the medieval fortifications, and it ranks among the oldest of the town's buildings; the narrowest house in Europe is nearby. The University Library building, erected in 1756, was used by the Diet of the Kingdom of Hungary from 1802 to 1848. Much of the significant legislation of the Hungarian Reform Era (such as the abolition of serfdom and the foundation of the Hungarian Academy of Sciences) was enacted there.

The historic centre is characterized by many baroque palaces. The Grassalkovich Palace, built around 1760, is now the residence of the Slovak president, and the Slovak government now has its seat in the former Archiepiscopal Palace. In 1805, diplomats of emperors Napoleon and Francis II signed the fourth Peace of Pressburg in the Primate's Palace, after Napoleon's victory in the Battle of Austerlitz. Some smaller houses are historically significant; composer Johann Nepomuk Hummel was born in an 18th-century house in the Old Town.

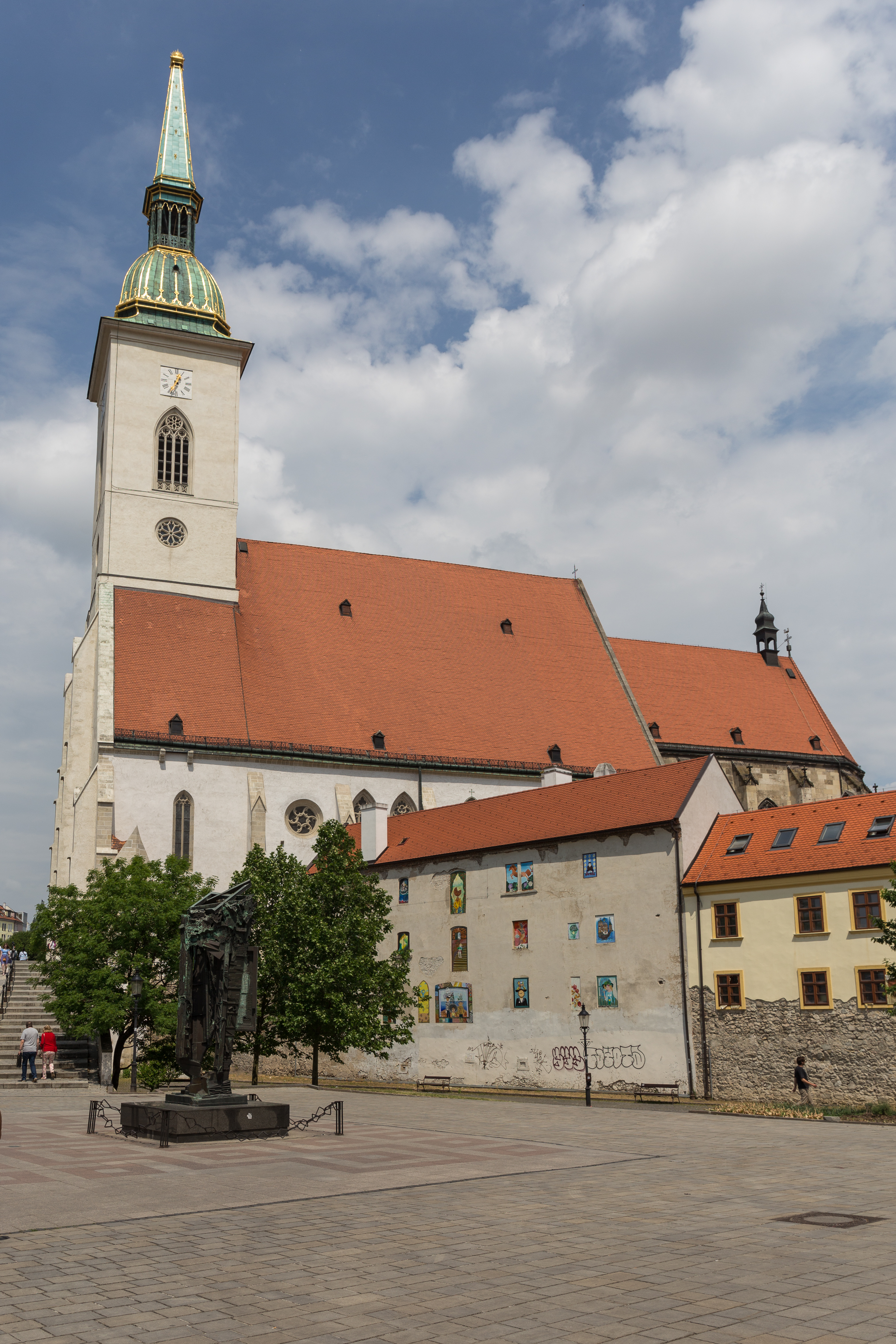
St. Martin's Cathedral

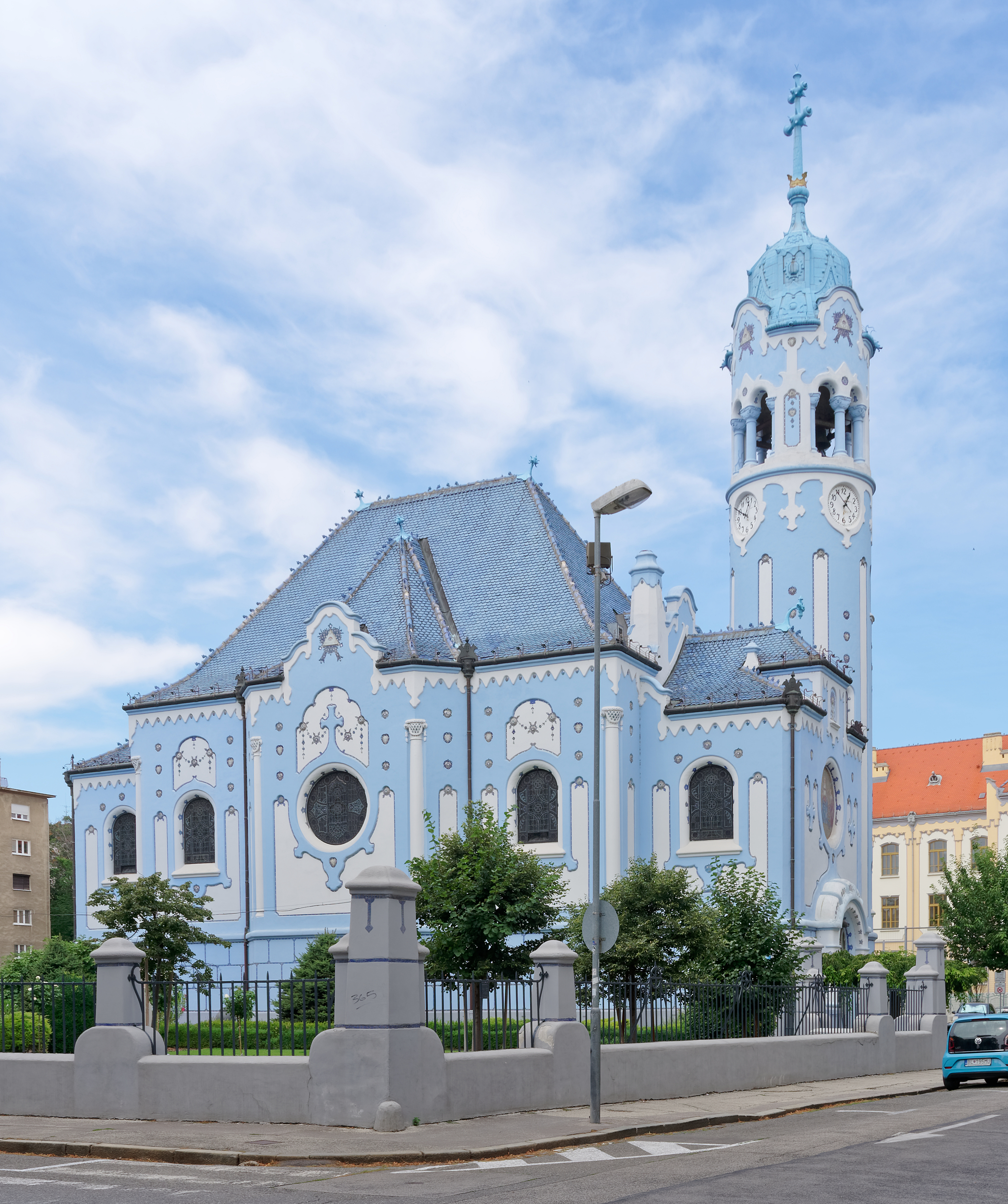
Church of St. Elisabeth

Notable cathedrals and churches include the Gothic St. Martin's Cathedral, built in the 13th–16th centuries, which served as the coronation church of the Kingdom of Hungary between 1536 and 1830. The Franciscan Church, dating to the 13th century, has been a place of knighting ceremonies and is the oldest preserved sacral building in the city. The Church of St. Elizabeth, better known as the Blue Church due to its colour, is built entirely in the Hungarian Secessionist style. Bratislava has one surviving functioning synagogue, out of the three major ones existing before the holocaust.

A curiosity is the underground (formerly ground-level) restored portion of the Jewish cemetery where 19th-century Rabbi Moses Sofer is buried, located at the base of the castle hill near the entrance to a tram tunnel. The only military cemetery in Bratislava is Slavín, unveiled in 1960 in honour of Soviet Army soldiers who fell during the liberation of Bratislava in April 1945. It offers a view of the city and the Little Carpathians.

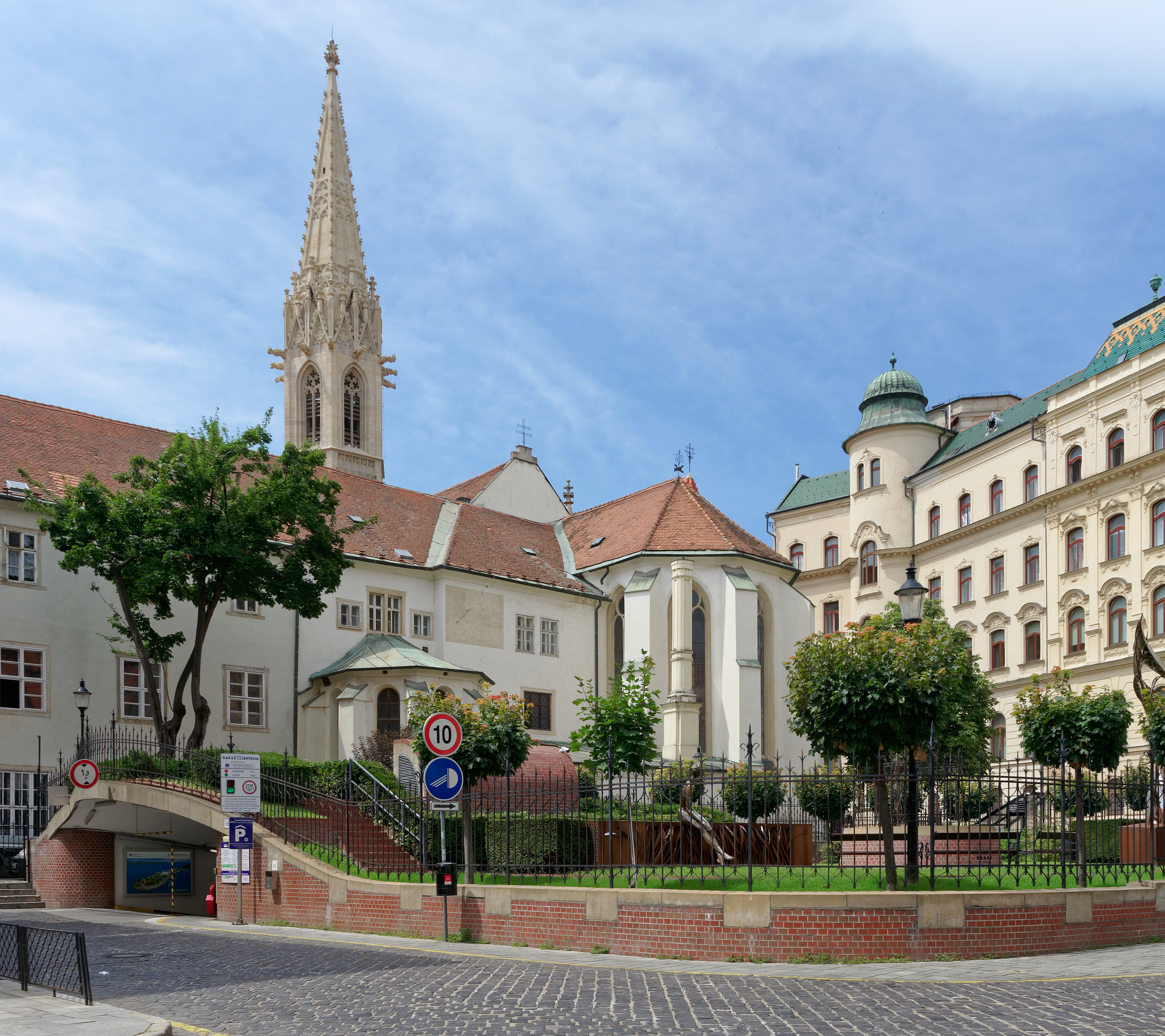
Franciscan Church and Monastery with the tall gothic tower was built in the late 13th century. The oldest building in Bratislava.

Other prominent 20th-century structures include the Most Slovenského národného povstania (Bridge of the Slovak national uprising) across the Danube featuring a UFO-like tower restaurant, Slovak Radio's inverted-pyramid-shaped headquarters, and the uniquely designed Kamzík TV Tower with an observation deck and rotating restaurant. In the early 21st century, new edifices have transformed the traditional cityscape. At the beginning of the 21st century, a construction boom has spawned new public structures, such as the Most Apollo and a new building of the Slovak National Theatre, as well as private real-estate development.

=== Bratislava Castle ===
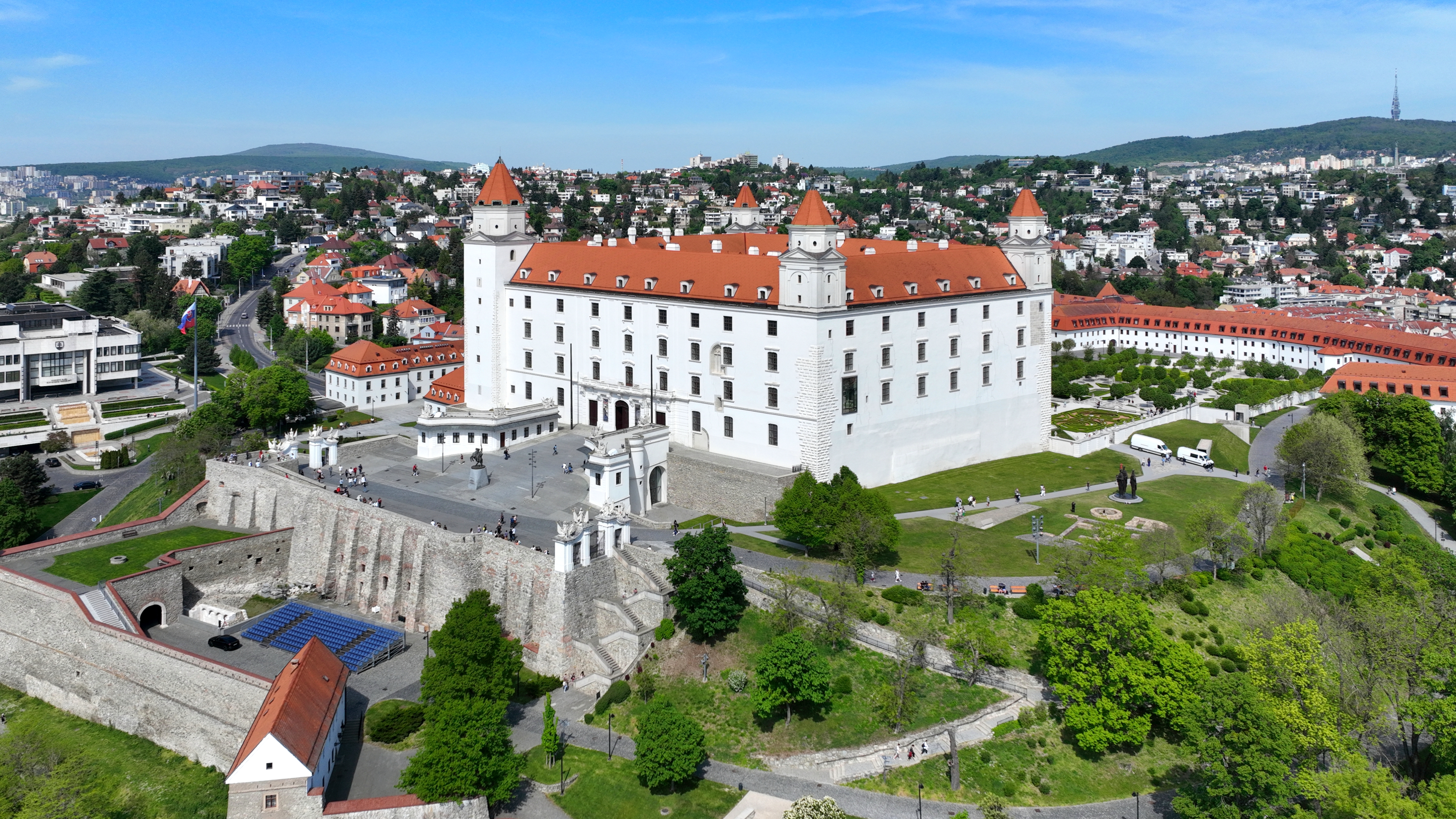
Bratislava Castle

One of the most prominent structures in the city is Bratislava Castle (Bratislavský hrad), situated on a plateau 85 metres (279 ft) above the Danube. The castle hill site has been inhabited since the transitional period between the Stone and Bronze ages and has been the acropolis of a Celtic town, part of the Roman limes Romanus, a huge Slavic fortified settlement, and a political, military and religious centre for Great Moravia. A stone castle was not constructed until the 10th century, when the area was part of the Kingdom of Hungary, however, in the 9th century a pre-romanesque stone basilica, was standing in the area of the hillfort.

The castle was converted into a Gothic anti-Hussite fortress under Sigismund of Luxemburg in 1430, became a Renaissance castle in 1562, and was rebuilt in 1649 in the baroque style. Under Queen Maria Theresa, the castle became a prestigious royal seat. In 1811, the castle was inadvertently destroyed by fire and lay in ruins until the 1950s, when it was rebuilt mostly in its former Theresian style. In the 1940s, it was planned to demolish the castle ruins and replace them with a new university complex. However, it was never realised, and in the 1960s, reconstruction began. Nowadays, it serves ceremonial purposes and as a historical museum of the Slovak National Museum.

=== Devín Castle ===
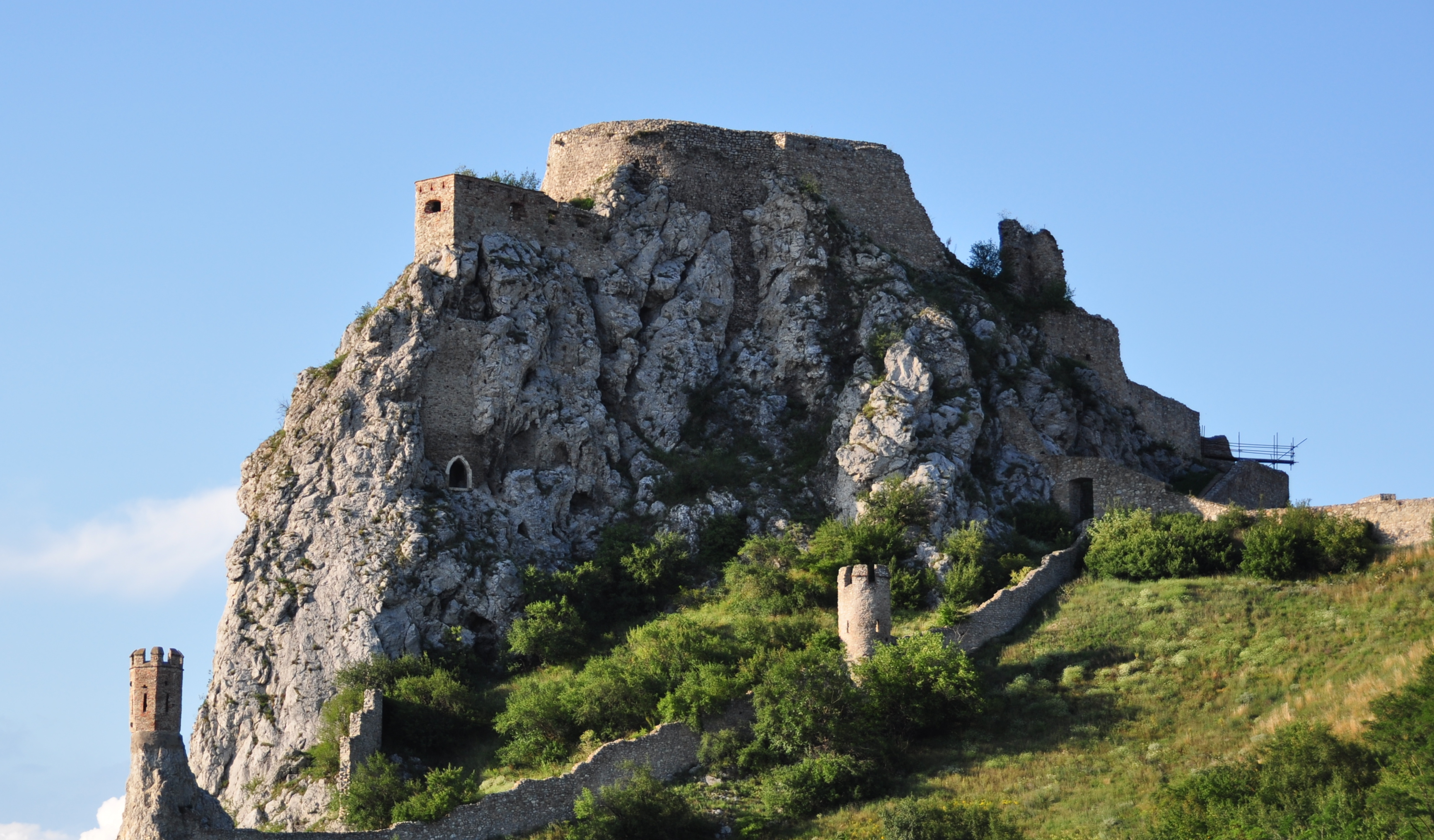
Ruins of Devín Castle, the first written reference to the Devín Castle dates back to 864.

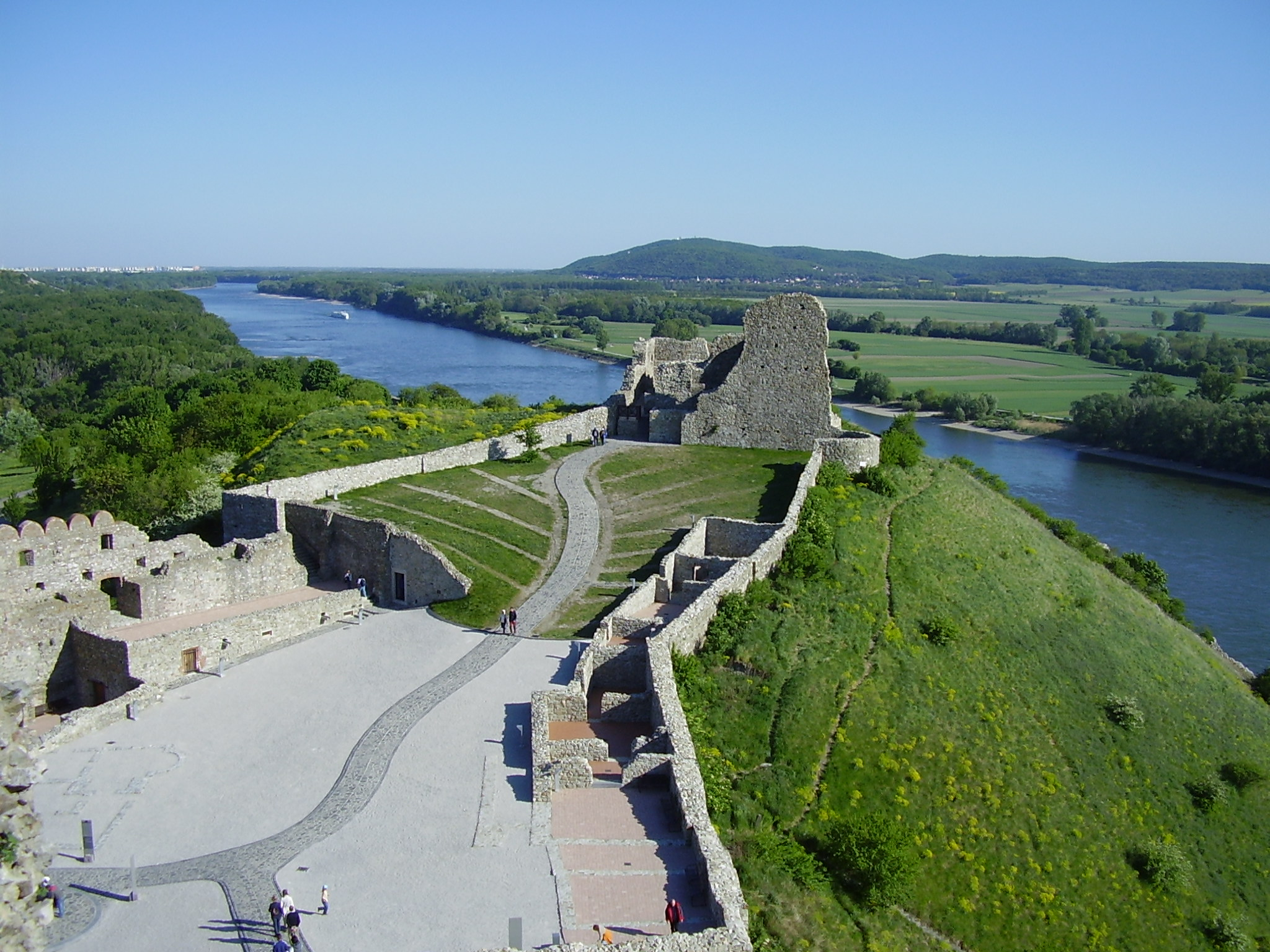
View from Devín Castle

The ruined and recently renovated Devín Castle is in the borough of Devín, on top of a rock where the Morava River, which forms the border between Austria and Slovakia, enters the Danube. It is one of the most important Slovak archaeological sites and contains a museum dedicated to its history. Due to its strategic location, Devín Castle was a very important frontier castle of Great Moravia and the early Hungarian state. It was destroyed by Napoleon's troops in 1809. It is an important symbol of Slovak and Slavic history.

=== Rusovce ===
Rusovce mansion, with its English park, is in the Rusovce borough. The house was originally built in the 17th century and was turned into an English neo-Gothic-style mansion in 1841–1844. The borough is also known for the ruins of the Roman military camp Gerulata, part of limes Romanus, a border defence system. Gerulata was built and used between the 1st and 4th centuries AD.

=== Parks and lakes ===
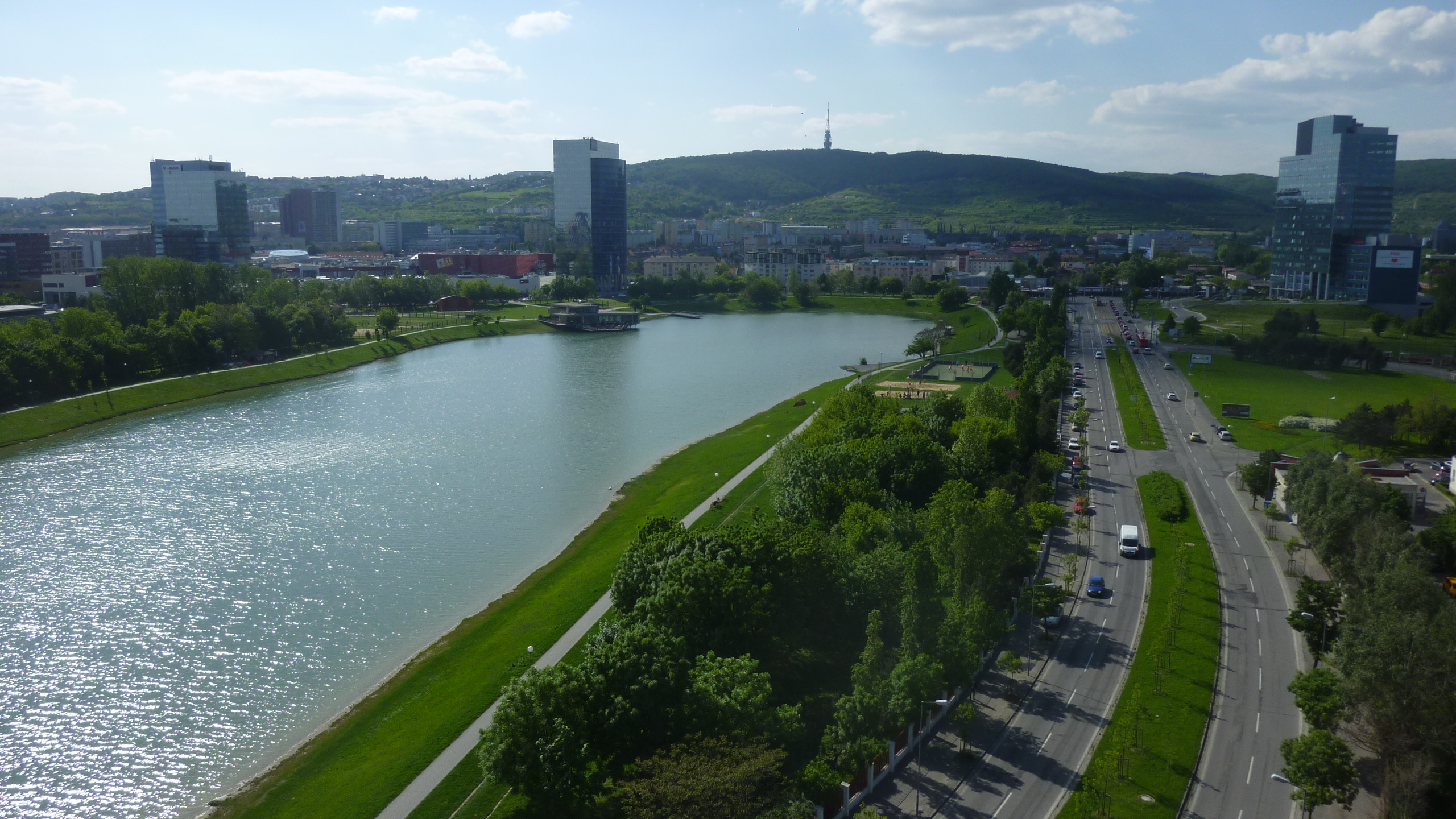
Kuchajda lake

Due to its location in the foothills of the Little Carpathians and its riparian vegetation on the Danubian floodplains, Bratislava has forests close to the city centre. The total amount of public green space is 46.8 square kilometres (18.1 sq mi), or 110 square metres (1,200 sq ft) per inhabitant.

The largest city park is Horský park (literally, Mountainous Park), in the Old Town. Bratislavský lesný park (Bratislava Forest Park) is located in the Little Carpathians and includes many locales popular among visitors, such as Železná studienka and Koliba. The Forest Park covers an area of 27.3 square kilometres (10.5 sq mi), of which 96% is forested mostly with oak and mixed oak/hornbeam forest, and contains original flora and fauna such as European badgers, red foxes, wild boar and red and roe deer. On the right bank of the Danube, in the borough of Petržalka, is Janko Kráľ Park founded in 1774–1776. A new city park is planned for Petržalka between the Malý Draždiak and Veľký Draždiak lakes.

Bratislava's zoological park is located in Mlynská dolina, near the headquarters of Slovak Television. The zoo, founded in 1960, currently houses 152 species of animals, including the rare white lion and white tiger. The Botanical Gardens, which belong to Comenius University, can be found on the Danube riverfront and house more than 120 species of domestic and foreign origin.

The city has several natural and human-made lakes, most of which are used for recreation. Examples include Štrkovec lake in Ružinov, Kuchajda in Nové Mesto, Zlaté Piesky and the Vajnory lakes in the north-east, and Rusovce lake in the south, which is popular with nudists.

== Demographics ==
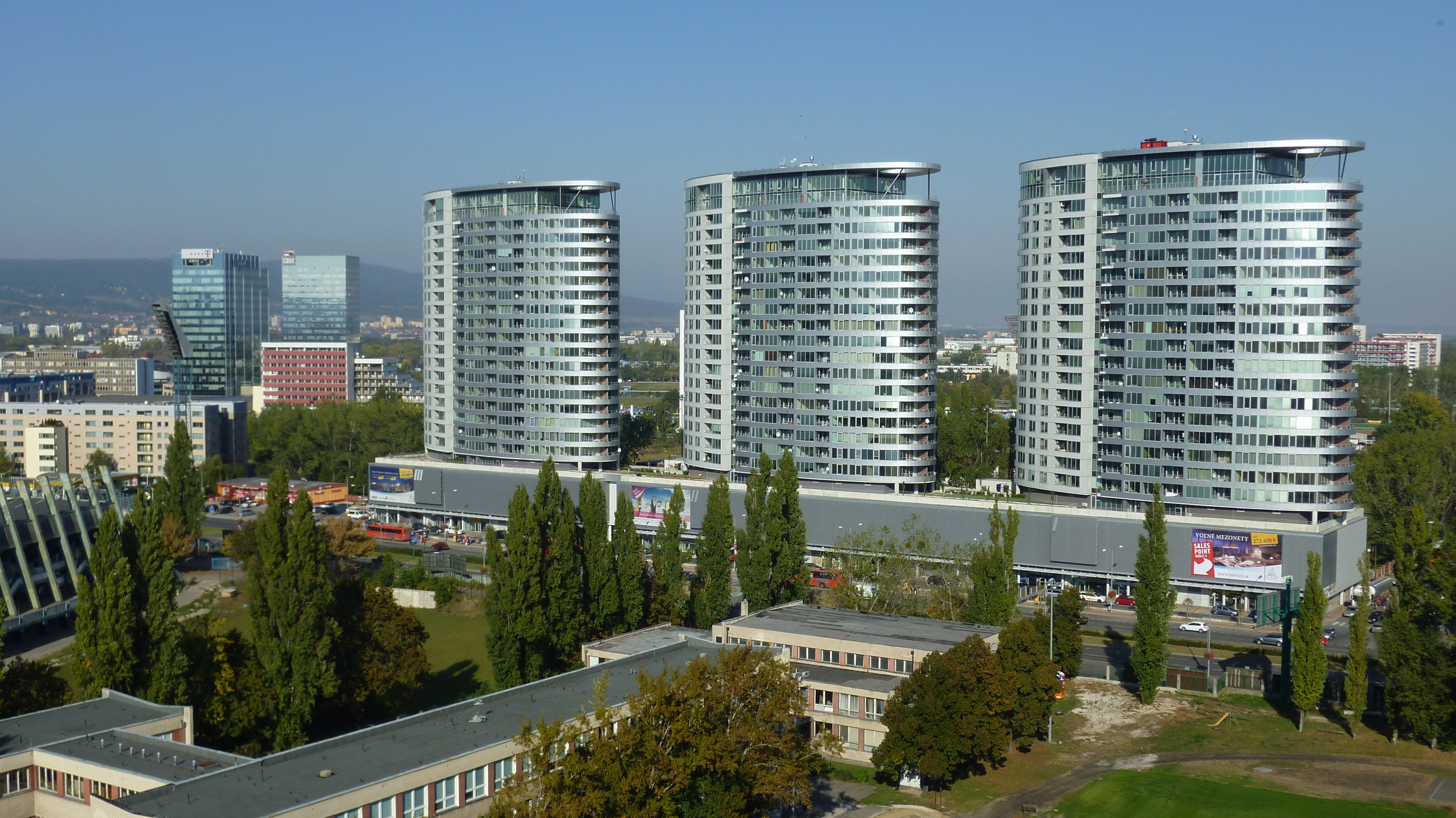
High-rise apartments in Bratislava

2021 census results
District	Population	Ethnic group	Population
Bratislava I–V	475,503	Slovaks	407,358
Bratislava I	46,080	Hungarians	11,167
Bratislava II	125,179	Czechs	5,031
Bratislava III	76,270	Ukrainians	1524
Bratislava IV	105,245	Germans	750
Bratislava V	122,729	Other/undeclared	47,239

From the city's origin until the 19th century, Germans were the dominant ethnic group. By the end of World War I, 42% of the population of Pressburg spoke German as their native language, 40% Hungarian, and 15% Slovak.

Historical population
Year	Pop.	±%
1950	194,225	—
1960	238,519	+22.8%
1970	305,932	+28.3%
1980	380,259	+24.3%
1991	442,197	+16.3%
2001	428,672	−3.1%
2011	411,228	−4.1%
2021	475,503	+15.6%

After the formation of the Czechoslovak Republic in 1918, Bratislava remained a multi-ethnic city, but with a different demographic trend. Due to Slovakization, the proportion of Slovaks and Czechs increased in the city, while the proportion of Germans and Hungarians fell. In 1938, 59% of the population were Slovaks or Czechs, while Germans represented 22% and Hungarians 13% of the city's population. The creation of the first Slovak Republic in 1939 brought other changes, most notably the expulsion of many Czechs and the deportation or flight of the Jews during the Holocaust. In 1945, most of the Germans were evacuated. After the restoration of Czechoslovakia, the Beneš decrees (partly revoked in 1948) collectively punished ethnic German and Hungarian minorities by expropriation and deportation to Germany, Austria, and Hungary for their alleged collaborationism with Nazi Germany and Hungary against Czechoslovakia.

The city thereby obtained its clearly Slovak character. Hundreds of citizens were expelled during the communist government of the 1950s, to replace people perceived as "reactionary" with members of the proletarian class. Since the 1950s, the Slovaks have been the dominant ethnicity in the city, making up around 90% of the city's population.

== Politics ==
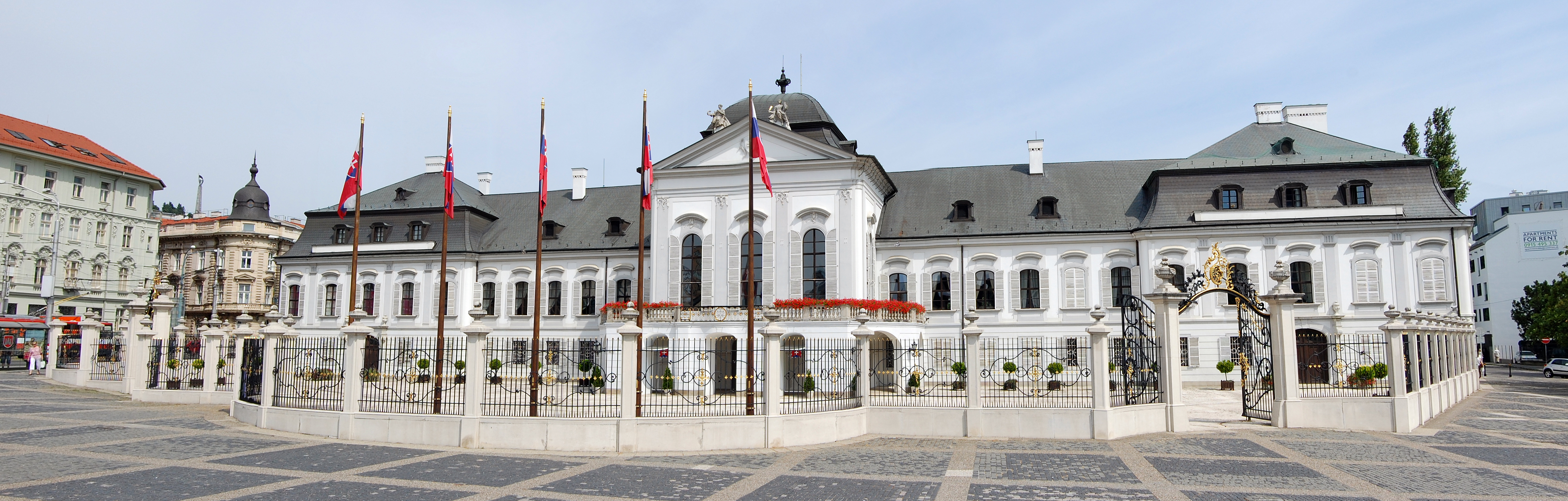
Grassalkovich Palace, seat of the president of Slovakia

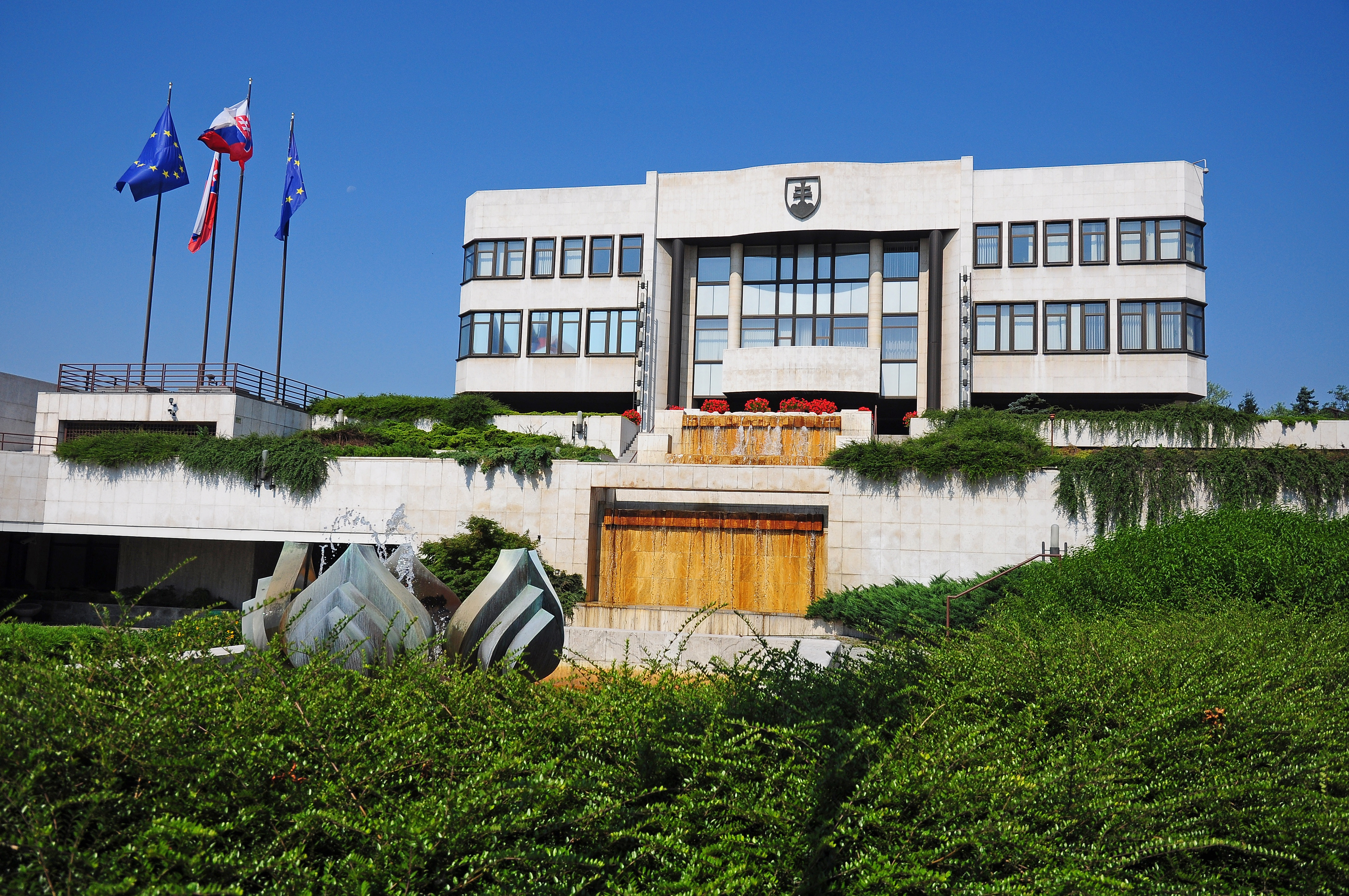
The building of the National Council of the Slovak Republic

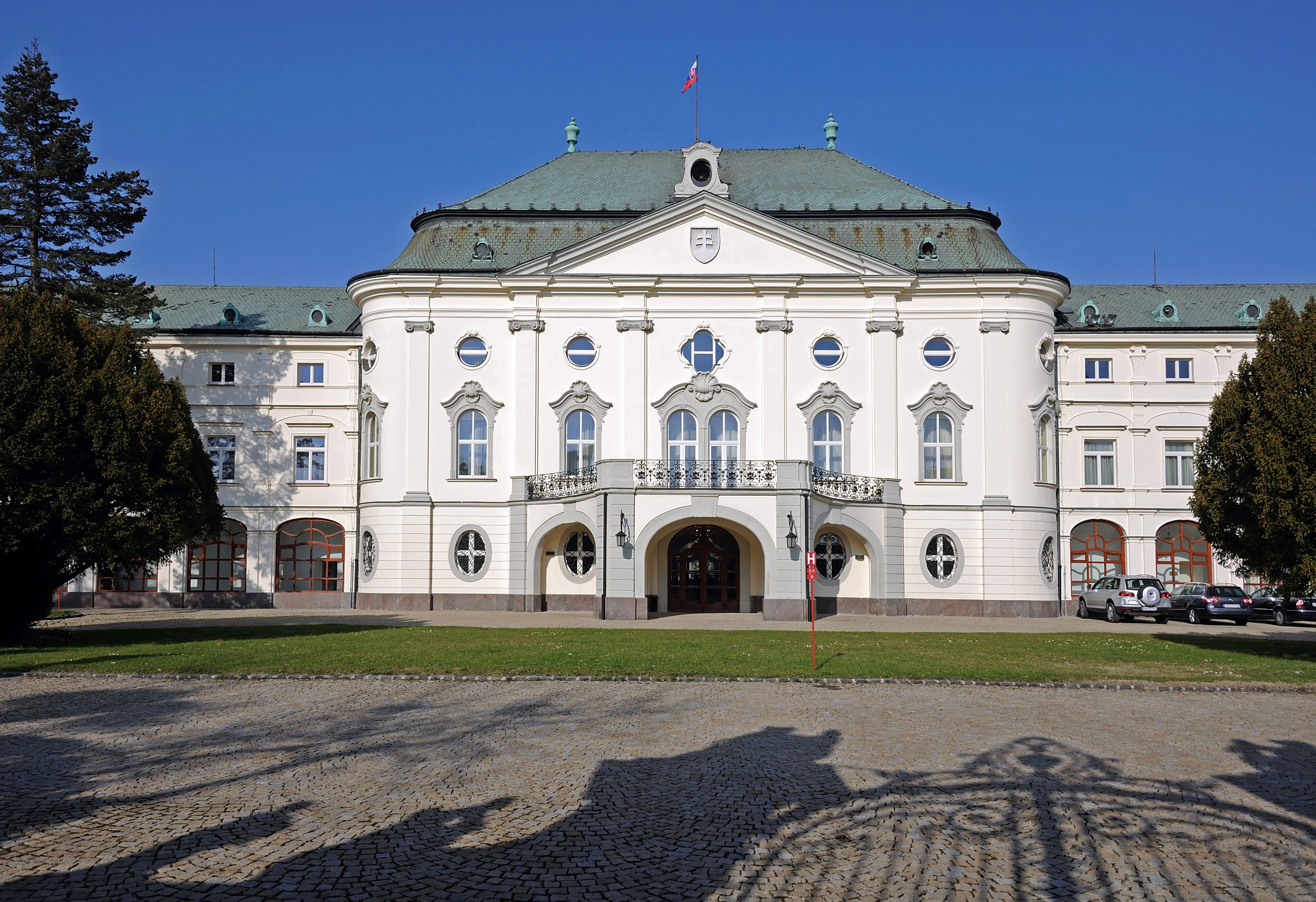
Episcopal Summer Palace, the seat of the government of Slovakia

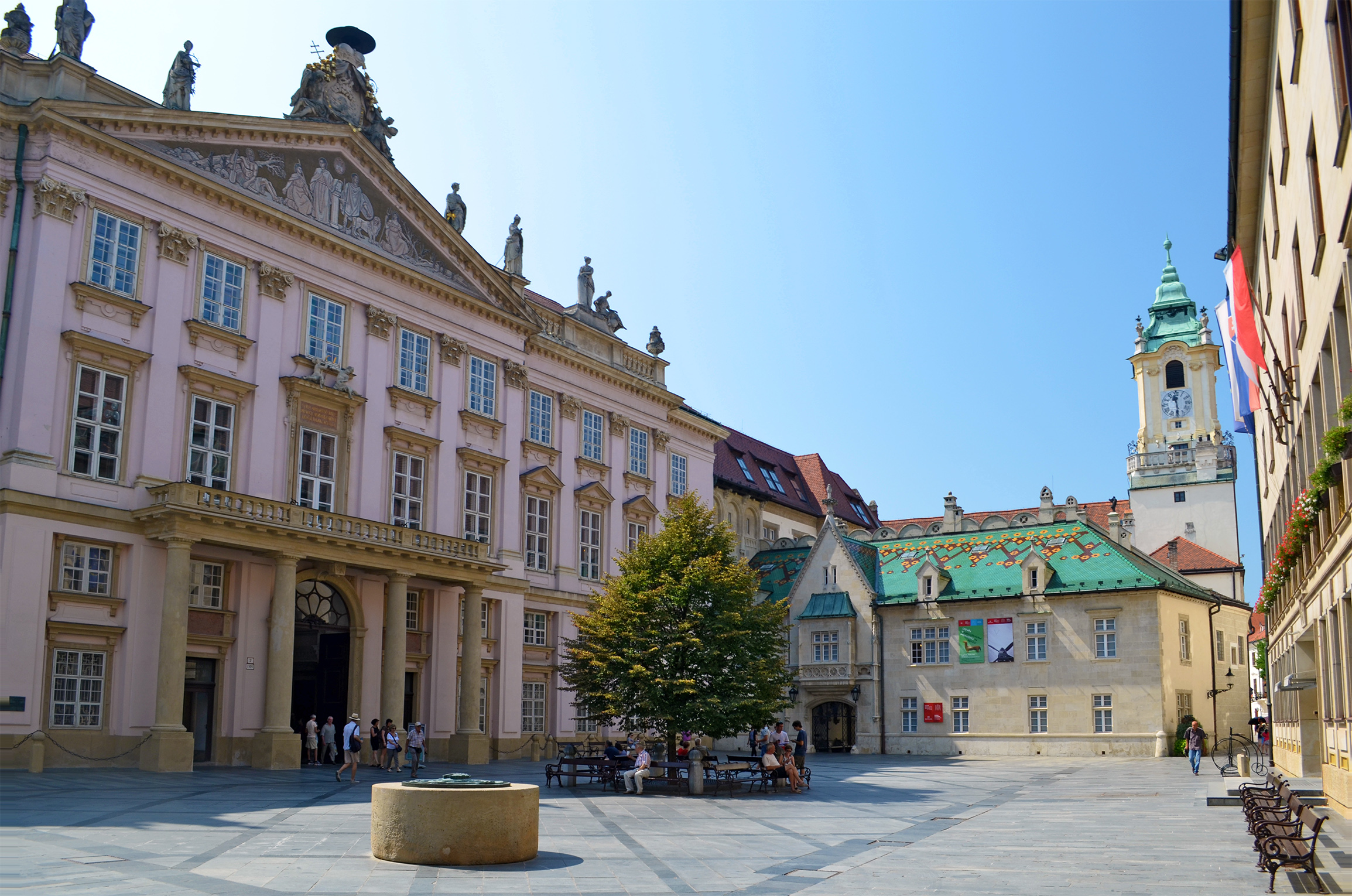
Primate's Palace at Primate's Square, the seat of the city's mayor

Bratislava is the seat of the Slovak parliament, presidency, ministries, supreme court (Slovak: Najvyšší súd), and central bank. It is the seat of the Bratislava Region and, since 2002, also of the Bratislava Self-Governing Region. The city hosts 41 foreign embassies and 22 consulates.

The current local government (Mestská samospráva) structure has been in place since 1990. It is composed of a mayor (primátor), a city board (Mestská rada), a city council (Mestské zastupiteľstvo), city commissions (Komisie mestského zastupiteľstva), and a city magistrate's office (Magistrát).

The mayor, based at the Primate's Palace, is the city's top executive officer and is elected to a four-year term of office. The current mayor of Bratislava is Matúš Vallo, who won the election held on October 29, 2022, as an independent candidate. The city council is the city's legislative body, responsible for issues such as budget, local ordinances, city planning, road maintenance, education, and culture.

=== City Council ===
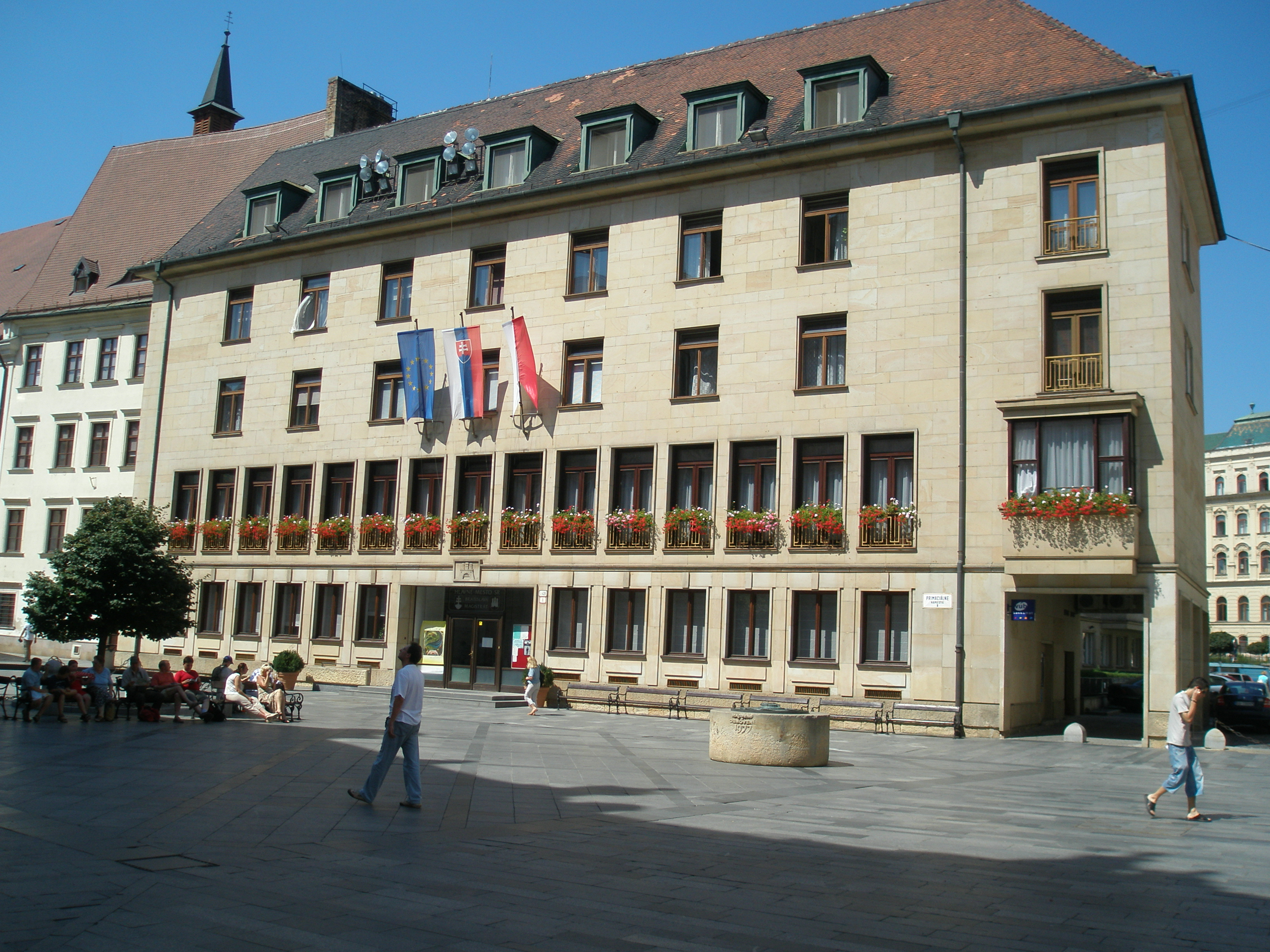
The building of the City Council

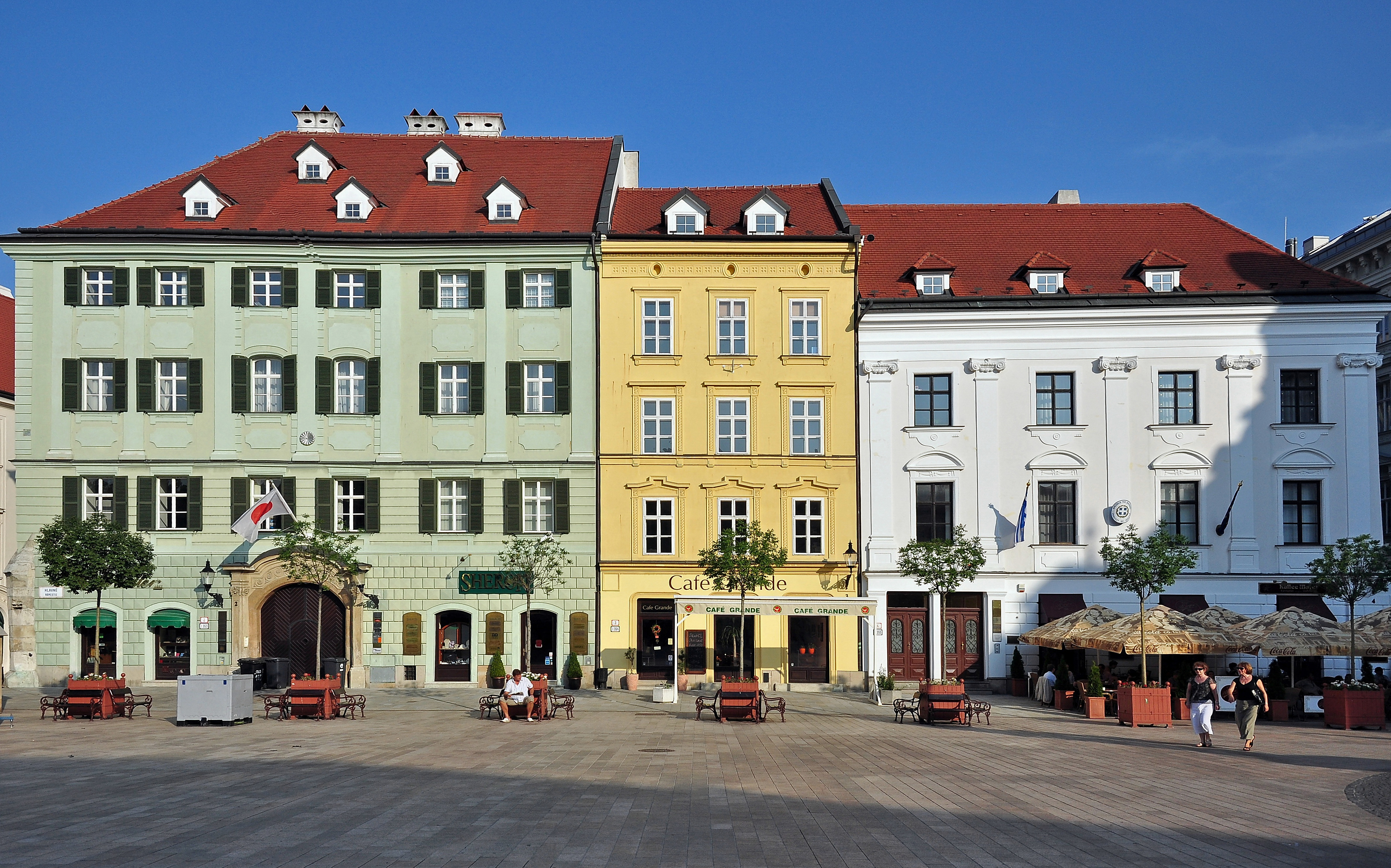
Embassy of Japan (left) and Greece (right) at the Main Square. There are 41 embassies and 22 honorary consulates in Bratislava.

The Bratislava City Council is the legislature of the City of Bratislava. It has 45 members. The Council usually convenes once a month and consists of 45 members elected to four-year terms concurrent with the mayor's. Many of the council's executive functions are carried out by the city commission at the council's direction. The city board is a 28-member body composed of the mayor and his deputies, the borough mayors, and up to ten city council members. The board is an executive and supervisory arm of the city council and also serves in an advisory role to the mayor.

=== Administration ===
Administratively, Bratislava is divided into five districts: Bratislava I (the city centre), Bratislava II (eastern parts), Bratislava III (north-eastern parts), Bratislava IV (western and northern parts) and Bratislava V (southern parts on the right bank of the Danube, including Petržalka, the most densely populated residential area in Central Europe).

For self-governance purposes, the city is divided into 17 boroughs, each of which has its own mayor (starosta) and council. The number of councillors in each depends on the size and population of the borough. Each of the boroughs coincides with the city's 20 cadastral areas, except for two cases: Nové Mesto is further divided into the Nové Mesto and Vinohrady cadastral areas and Ružinov is divided into Ružinov, Nivy and Trnávka. Further unofficial division recognizes additional quarters and localities.

Bratislava's territorial divisions
District	Borough	Map
Bratislava I	Staré Mesto	
Bratislava II	Ružinov	
Bratislava II	Vrakuňa	
Bratislava II	Podunajské Biskupice	
Bratislava III	Nové Mesto	
Bratislava III	Rača	
Bratislava III	Vajnory	
Bratislava IV	Dúbravka	
Bratislava IV	Karlova Ves	
Bratislava IV	Devín	
Bratislava IV	Devínska Nová Ves	
Bratislava IV	Lamač	
Bratislava IV	Záhorská Bystrica	
Bratislava V	Petržalka	
Bratislava V	Jarovce	
Bratislava V	Rusovce	
Bratislava V	Čunovo	

== Economy ==
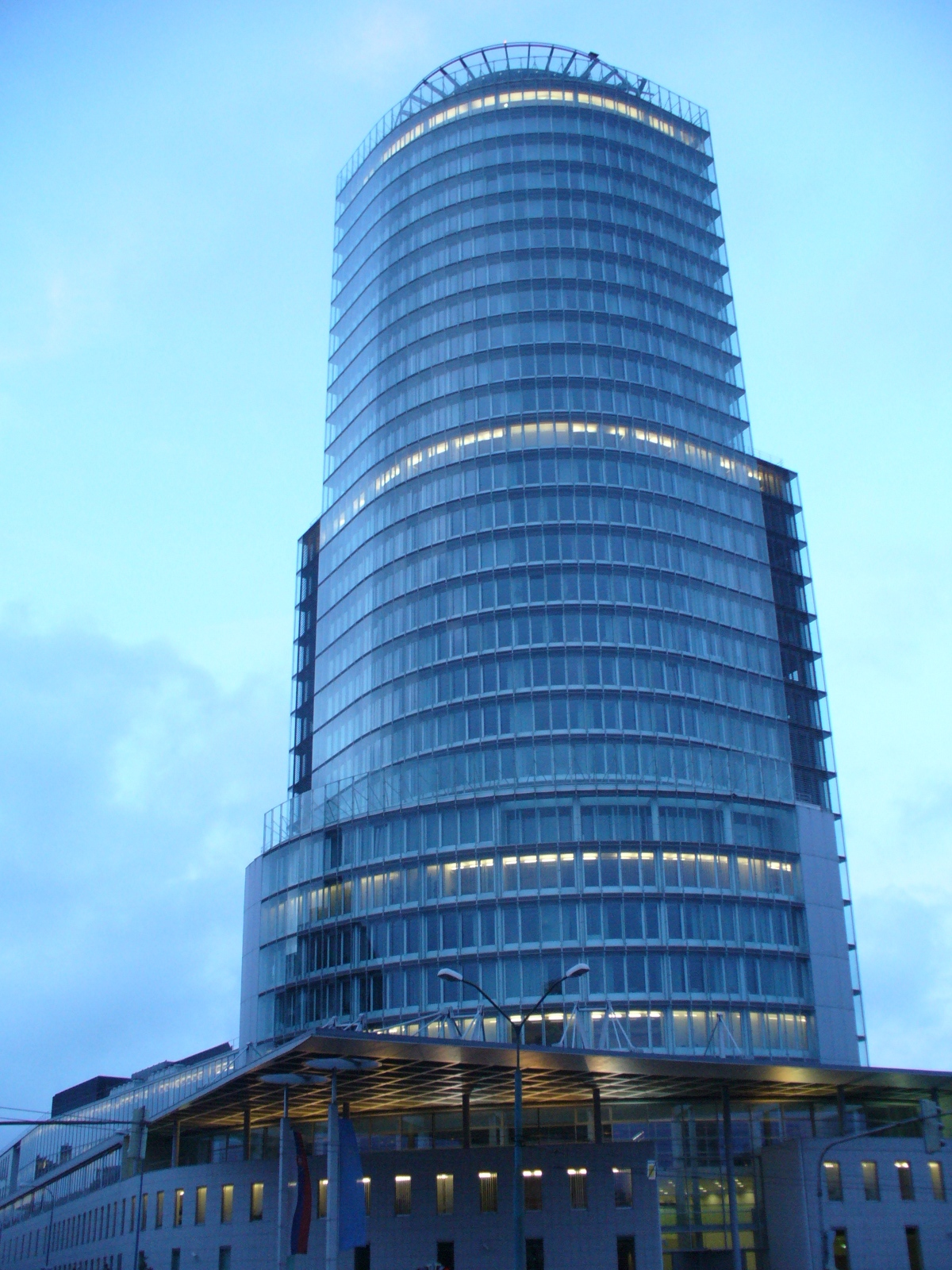
National Bank of Slovakia

The Bratislava Region is the wealthiest and most economically prosperous region in Slovakia, despite being the smallest by area and having the third smallest population of the eight Slovak regions. It accounts for about 26% of the Slovak GDP. According to GDP per capita, Bratislava is the 19th-richest region in the European Union in 2023. The unemployment rate in Bratislava was 2,38% in June 2023. The average monthly salary in the Bratislava region in 2026 was €2421.

Many governmental institutions and private companies have their headquarters in Bratislava. More than 75% of Bratislava's population works in the service sector, mainly composed of trade, banking, IT, Telecommunications, and tourism. The Bratislava Stock Exchange (BSSE), the organiser of the public securities market, was founded on March 15, 1991.

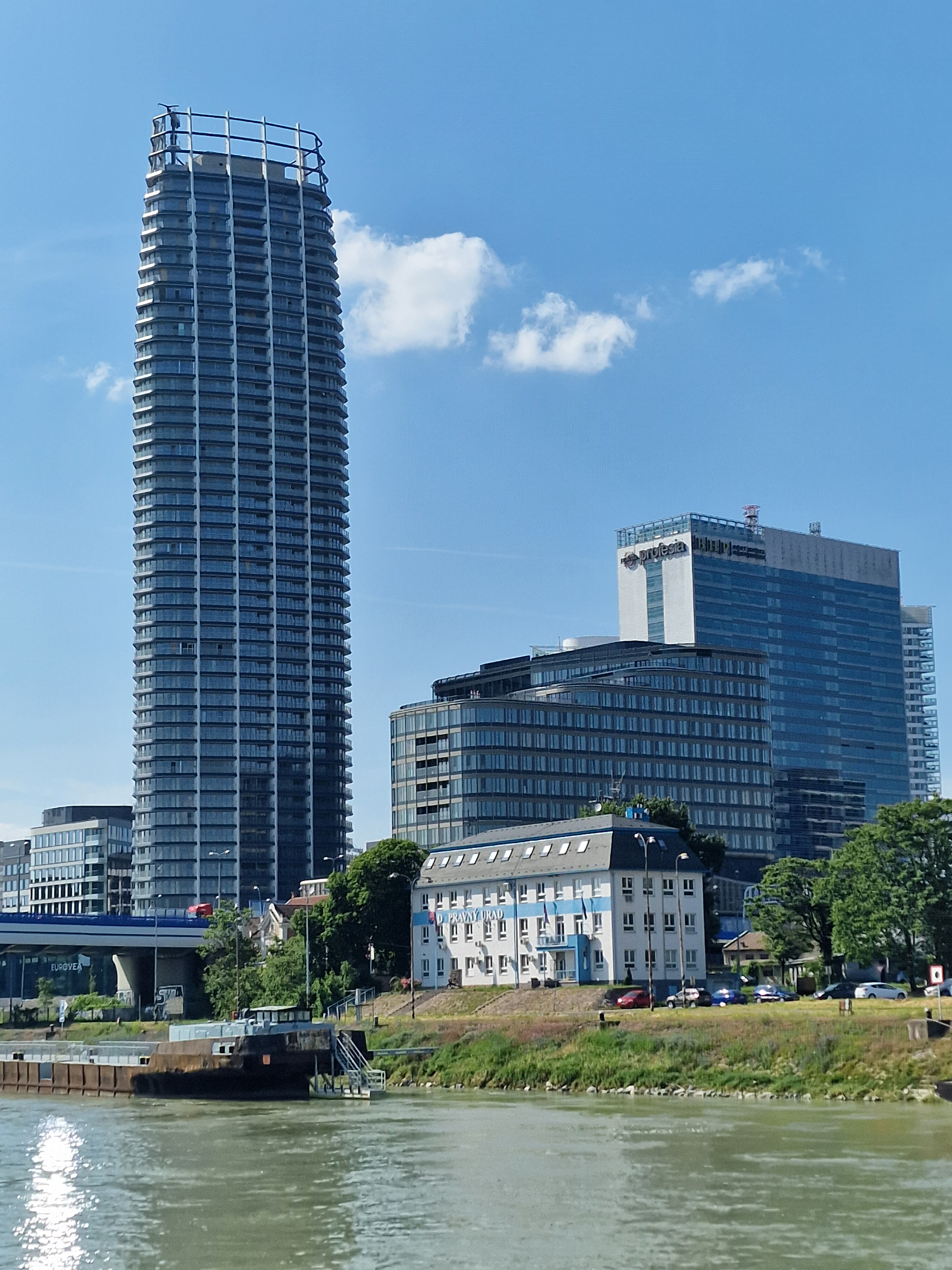
Residential building Eurovea Tower, the tallest building in Slovakia

Companies operating predominantly in Bratislava with the highest value added according to the 2018 Trend Top 200 ranking, include the Volkswagen Bratislava Plant, Slovnaft refinery (MOL), Eset (software developer), Asseco (software company), PPC Power (producer of heat and steam) and Trenkwalder personnel agency.

Volkswagen Group took over and expanded the BAZ factory in 1991, and has since considerably expanded production beyond original Skoda Auto models. Currently, 68% of production is focused on SUVs: Audi Q7; VW Touareg; as well as the body and under-chassis of the Porsche Cayenne. Since 2012, production has also included the Volkswagen up!, SEAT Mii and Skoda Citigo.

In recent years, service and high-tech-oriented businesses have prospered in Bratislava. Many global companies, including IBM, Dell, Lenovo, AT&T, SAP, Amazon, Johnson Controls, Swiss Re and Accenture, have built outsourcing and service centres here. Reasons for the influx of multi-national corporations include proximity to Western Europe, skilled labour force, and the high density of universities and research facilities. Also Slovak IT companies including ESET, Sygic and Pixel Federation have headquarters in Bratislava.

Other large companies and employers with headquarters in Bratislava include Slovak Telekom, Orange Slovensko, Slovenská sporiteľňa, Tatra banka, Doprastav, Hewlett-Packard Slovakia, Slovnaft, Henkel Slovensko, Slovenský plynárenský priemysel, Kraft Foods Slovakia, Whirlpool Slovakia, Železnice Slovenskej republiky, AeroMobil, and Tesco Stores Slovak Republic.

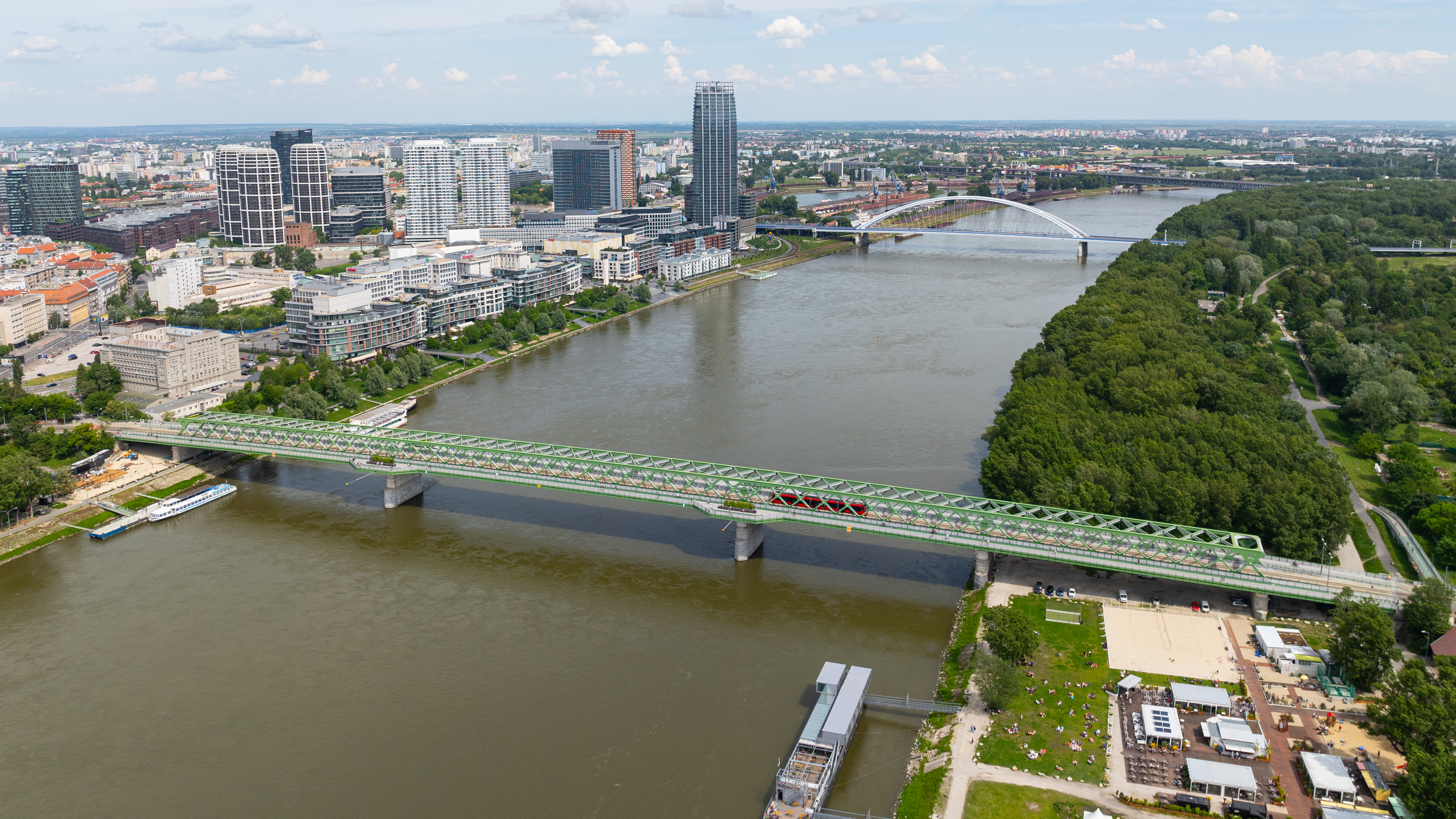
High-rise buildings in new Bratislava downtown. The area is composed of Sky Park, Eurovea City and New Nivy, 2024.

The Slovak economy's strong growth in the 2000s has led to a boom in the construction industry, and several major projects have been completed or are planned in Bratislava. Areas attracting developers include the Danube riverfront, where two major projects are already finished: River Park in the Old Town, and Eurovea near the Apollo Bridge. Other locations under development include the areas around the main railway and bus stations, the former industrial zone near the Old Town and in the boroughs of Petržalka, Nové Mesto and Ružinov. In 2010, the city had a balanced budget of €277 million, with one fifth used for investment. Bratislava holds shares in 17 companies directly, including the city's public transport company Dopravný podnik Bratislava, the waste collection and disposal company named OLO (Odvoz a likvidácia odpadu), and the water utility. The city also manages municipal organisations such as the city police (Mestská polícia), Bratislava City Museum and ZOO Bratislava.

=== Tourism ===
In 2022, a total of 927,950 people came to visit Bratislava and spent 1,719,409 nights there. These were most commonly 65% foreigners. Bratislava attracts predominantly visitors from the neighboring and nearby countries - the Czech Republic, Germany, Austria, and Poland. The top 5 is closed by visitors from the UK. Bratislava offered 272 accommodation facilities with 10,338 rooms in 2022. A considerable share of visits is made by those who visit Bratislava for a single day, but their exact number is not available.

Among other factors, the growth of low-cost airline flights to Bratislava, led by Ryanair, has led to conspicuous stag parties, primarily from the UK. While these are a boom to the city's tourism industry, cultural differences and vandalism have led to concern by local officials. Reflecting the popularity of rowdy parties in Bratislava in the early to mid-2000s, the city was a setting in the 2004 comedy film Eurotrip, which was actually filmed in the city of Prague, the Czech Republic.

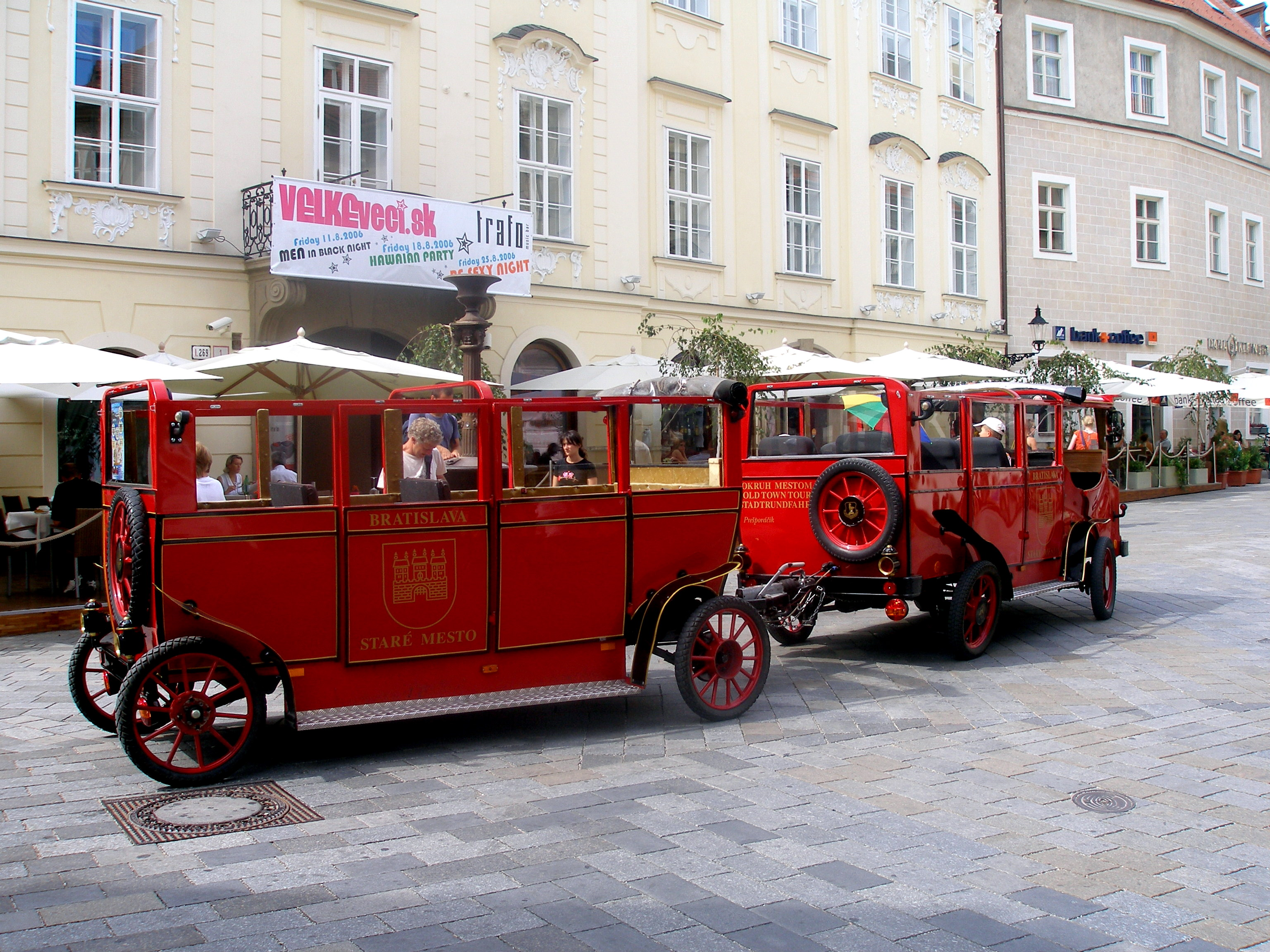
The Prešporáčik tourist train in the Old Town

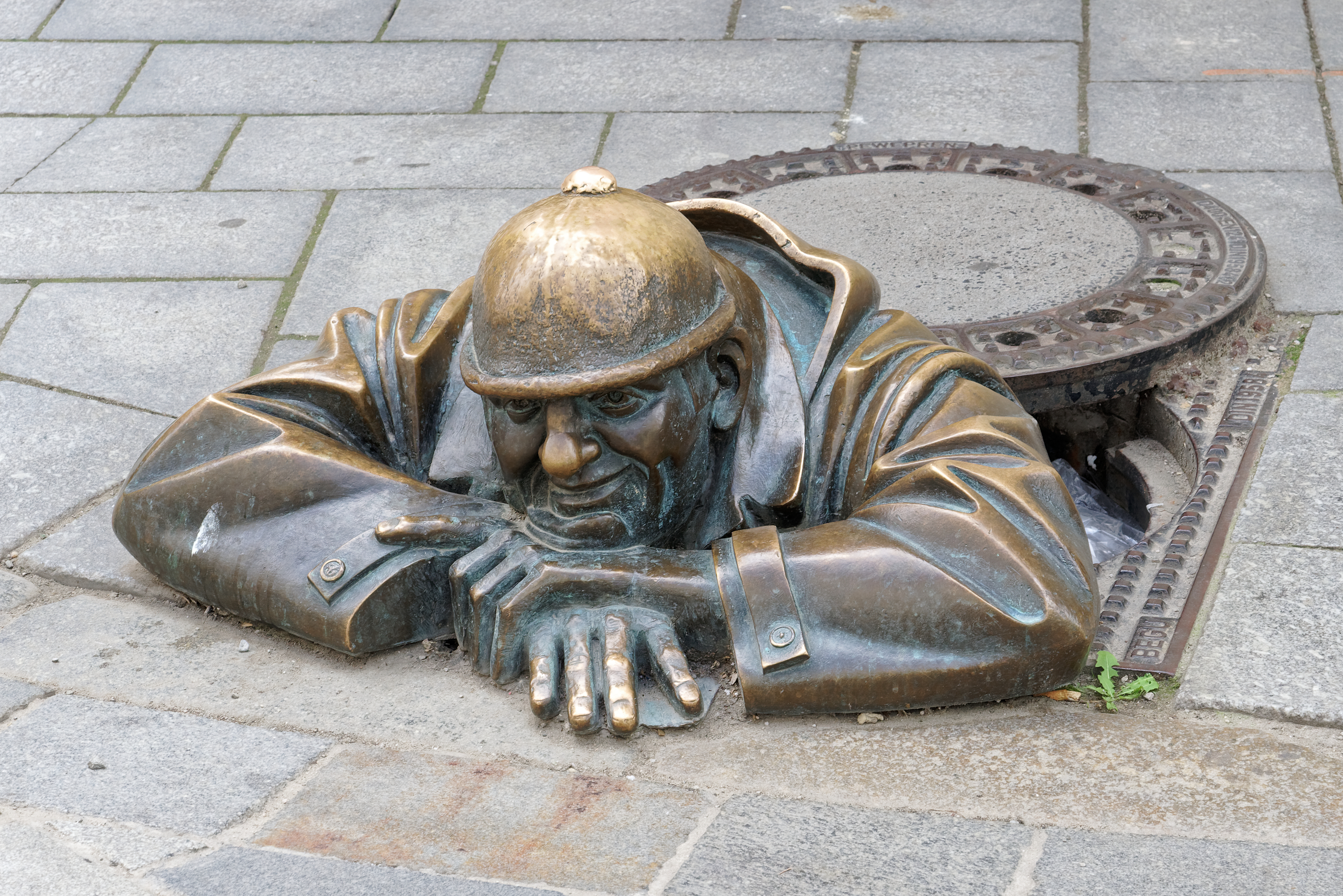
Man at Work (Čumil), an icon in the Old Town

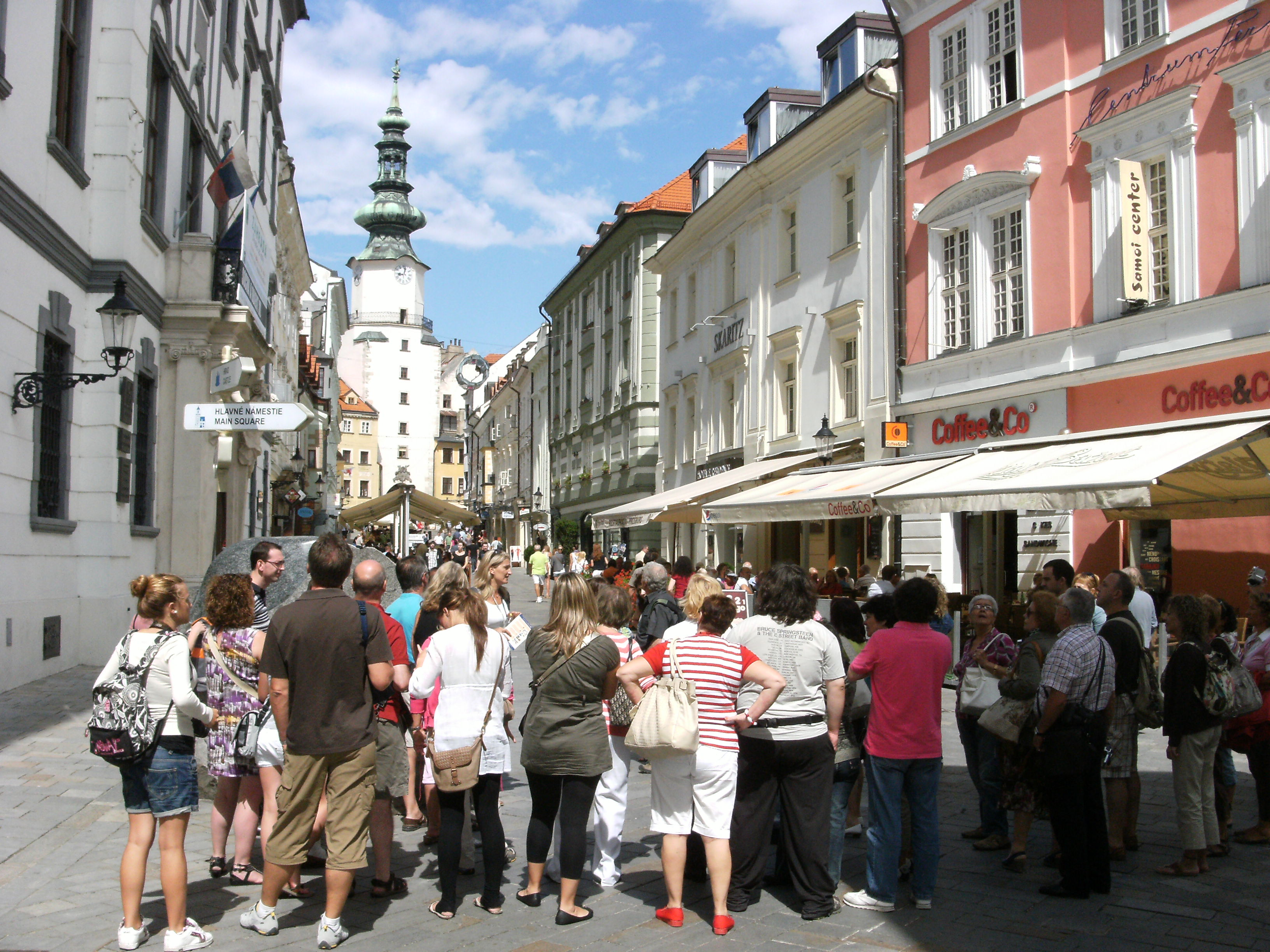
Group of tourists on a street of Old Town front of Michael's Gate

=== Shopping ===
Bratislava has eight major shopping centres: Aupark, Avion Shopping Park, Bory Mall, Central, Eurovea Galleria, Nivy Centrum, Vivo! (formerly Polus City Center) and Shopping Palace.

A month before Christmas, the Main Square in Bratislava is illuminated by a Christmas tree, and the Christmas market stalls are officially opened. Around 100 booths are opened every year. It is open most of the day as well as in the evening.

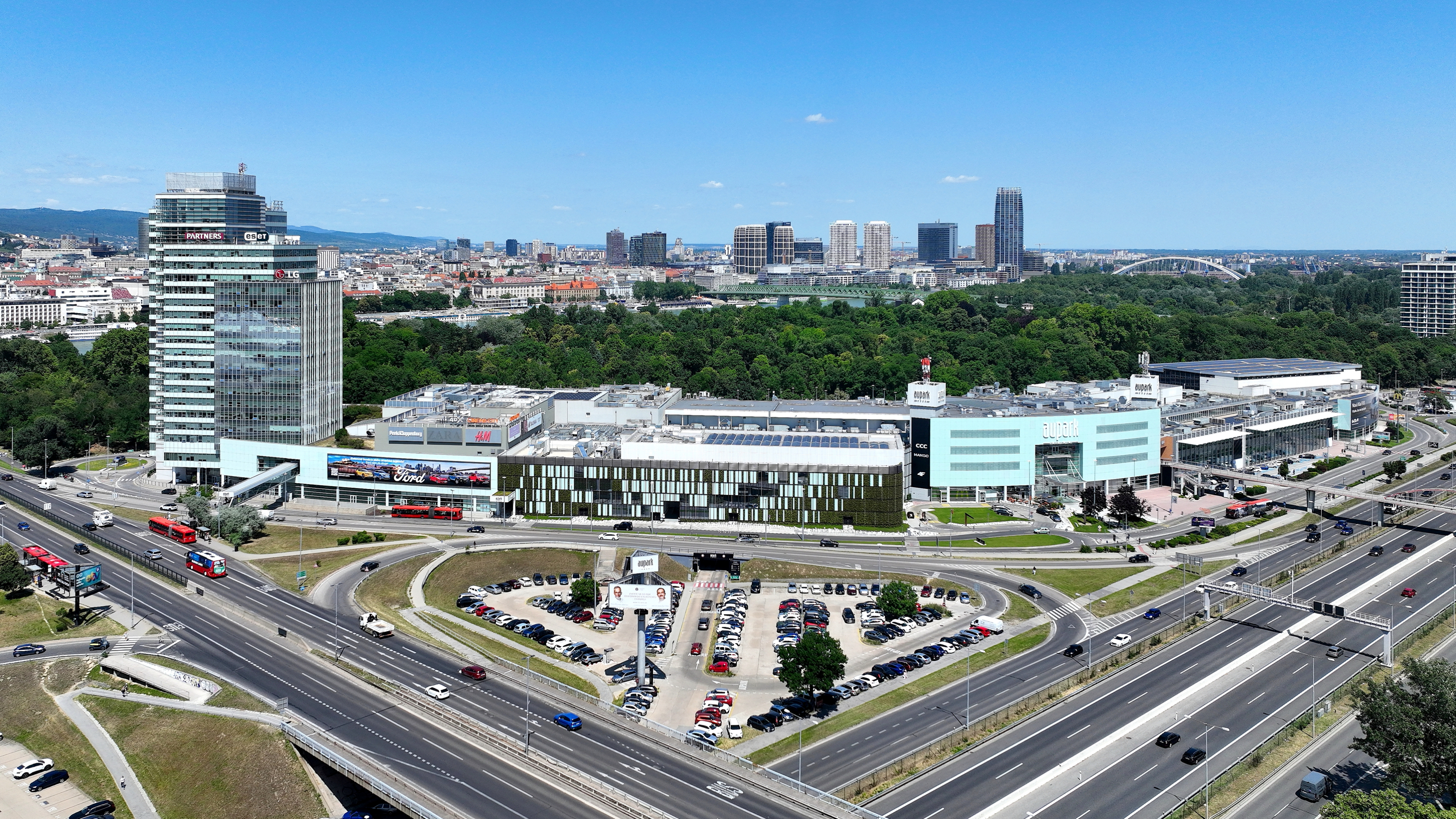
Aupark shopping mall

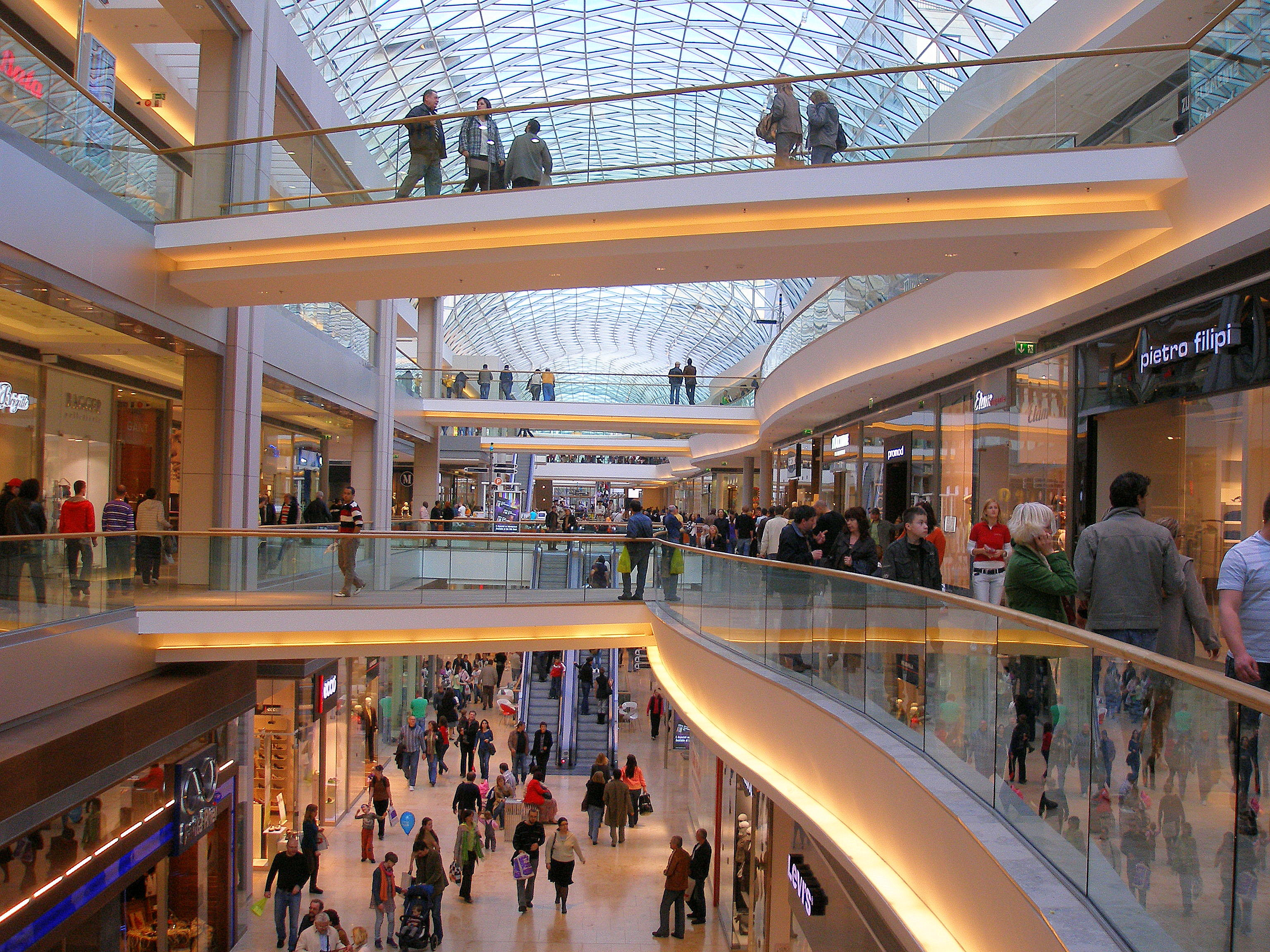
Interior of Eurovea Galleria shopping mall

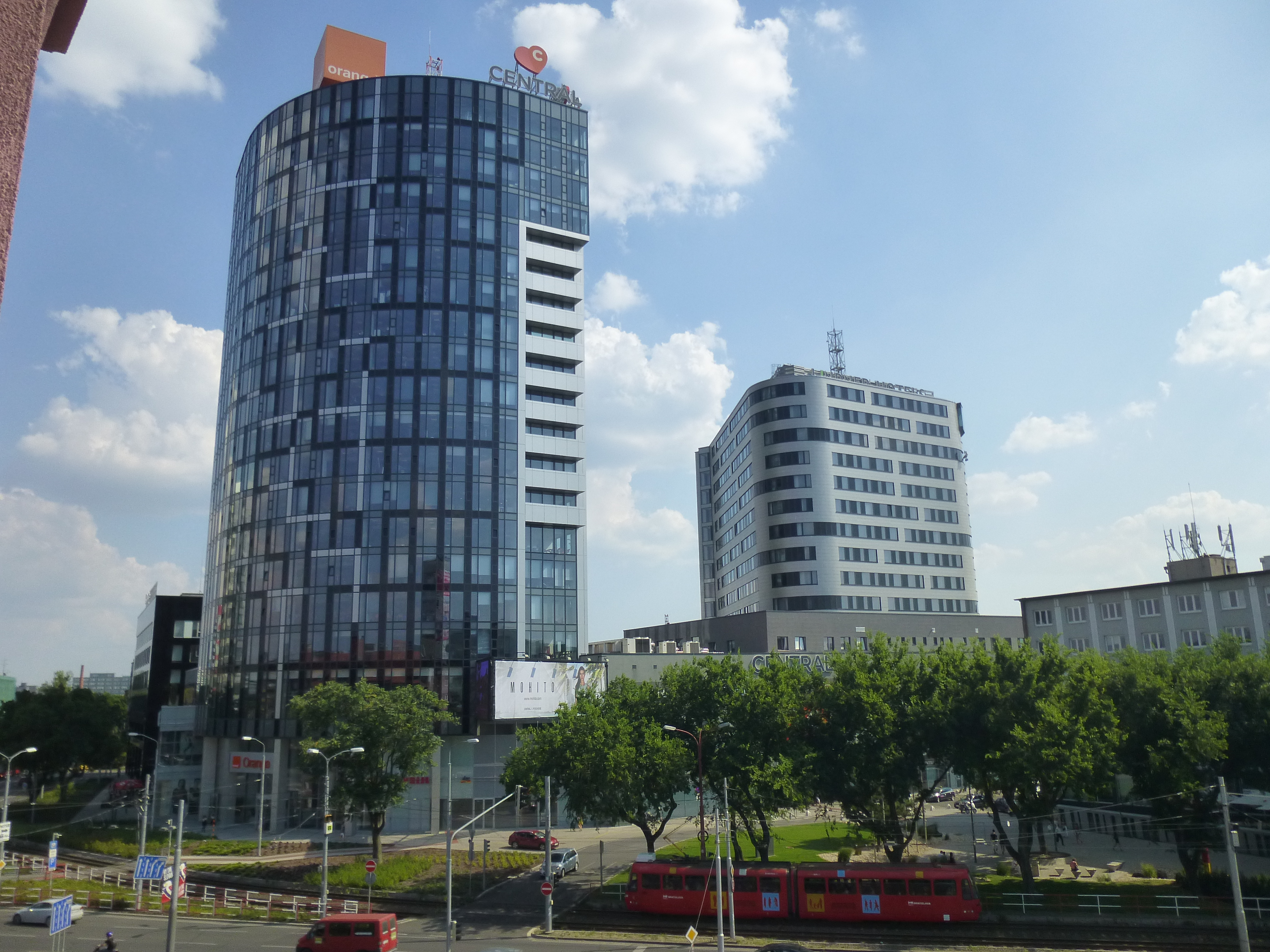
Central shopping mall

== Culture ==
Bratislava is the cultural heart of Slovakia. Owing to its historical multi-cultural character, local culture is influenced by various ethnic and religious groups, including Germans, Slovaks, Hungarians, and Jews. Bratislava enjoys numerous theatres, museums, galleries, concert halls, cinemas, film clubs, and foreign cultural institutions.

=== Performing arts ===
Bratislava is the seat of the Slovak National Theatre, housed in two buildings. The first is a Neo-Renaissance theatre building situated in the Old Town at the end of Hviezdoslav Square. The new building, opened to the public in 2007, is on the riverfront. The theatre has three ensembles: opera, ballet, and drama. Smaller theatres include the New Scene Theatre, the Astorka Korzo '90 Theatre, the Arena Theatre, the L+S Studio, the Naive Theatre of Radošina, and the Bratislava Puppet Theatre.

Music in Bratislava flourished in the 18th century and was closely linked to Viennese musical life. Mozart visited the town at the age of six. Among other notable composers who visited or lived in the town were Haydn, Liszt, Bartók and Beethoven. It is also the birthplace of the composers Johann Nepomuk Hummel, Ernő Dohnányi, and Franz Schmidt. Bratislava is home to both the Slovak Philharmonic Orchestra and the chamber orchestra, Capella Istropolitana. The city hosts several annual festivals, such as the Bratislava Music Festival and Bratislava Jazz Days. During the summer, various musical events take place as part of the Bratislava Cultural Summer at Bratislava Castle. Apart from musical festivals, it is possible to hear music ranging from underground to well-known pop stars.

Bratislava is home to two of Slovakia's national folk dance ensembles, Lúčnica and Slovenský ľudový umelecký kolektív (SĽUK).

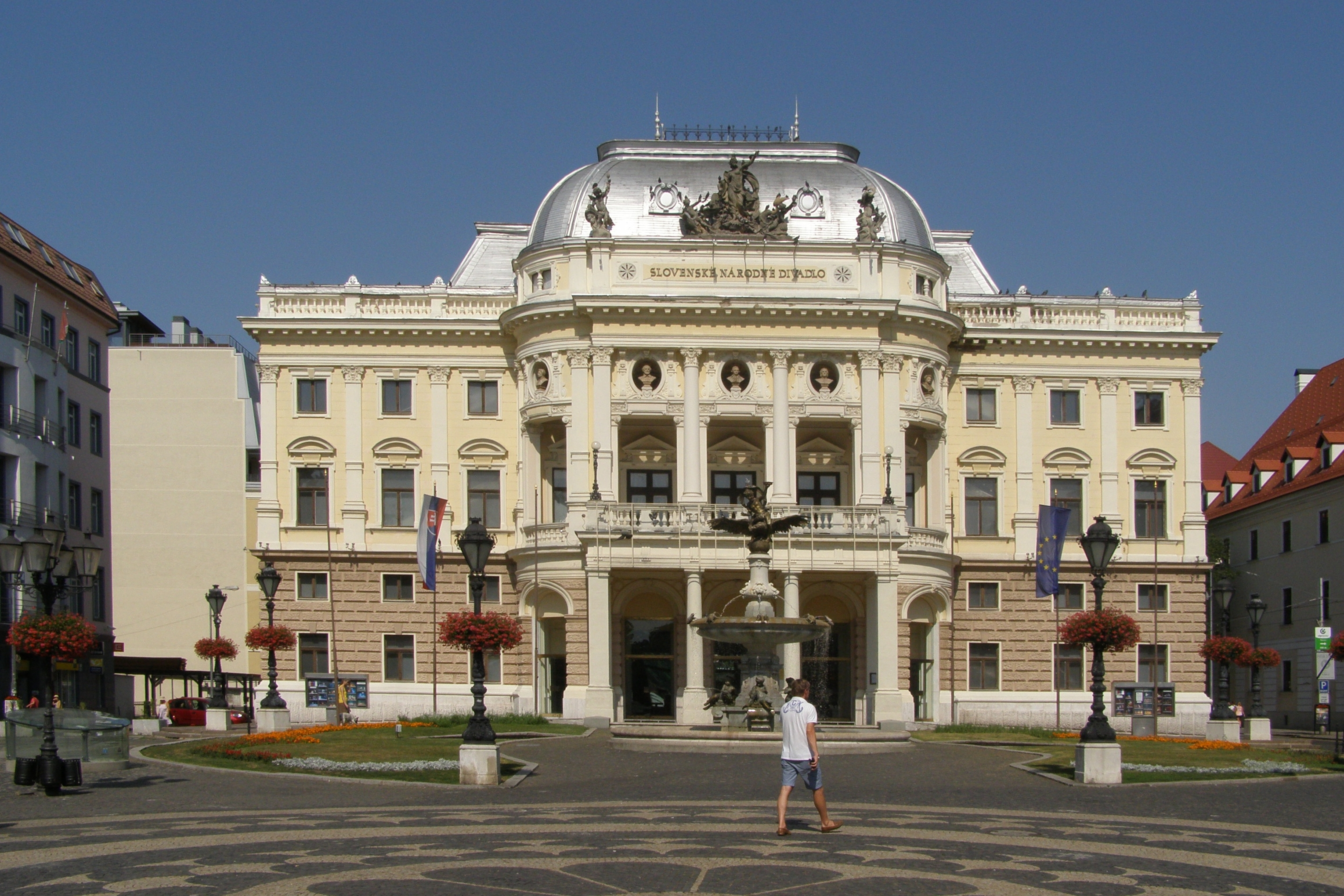
The old Slovak National Theatre building on Hviezdoslav Square

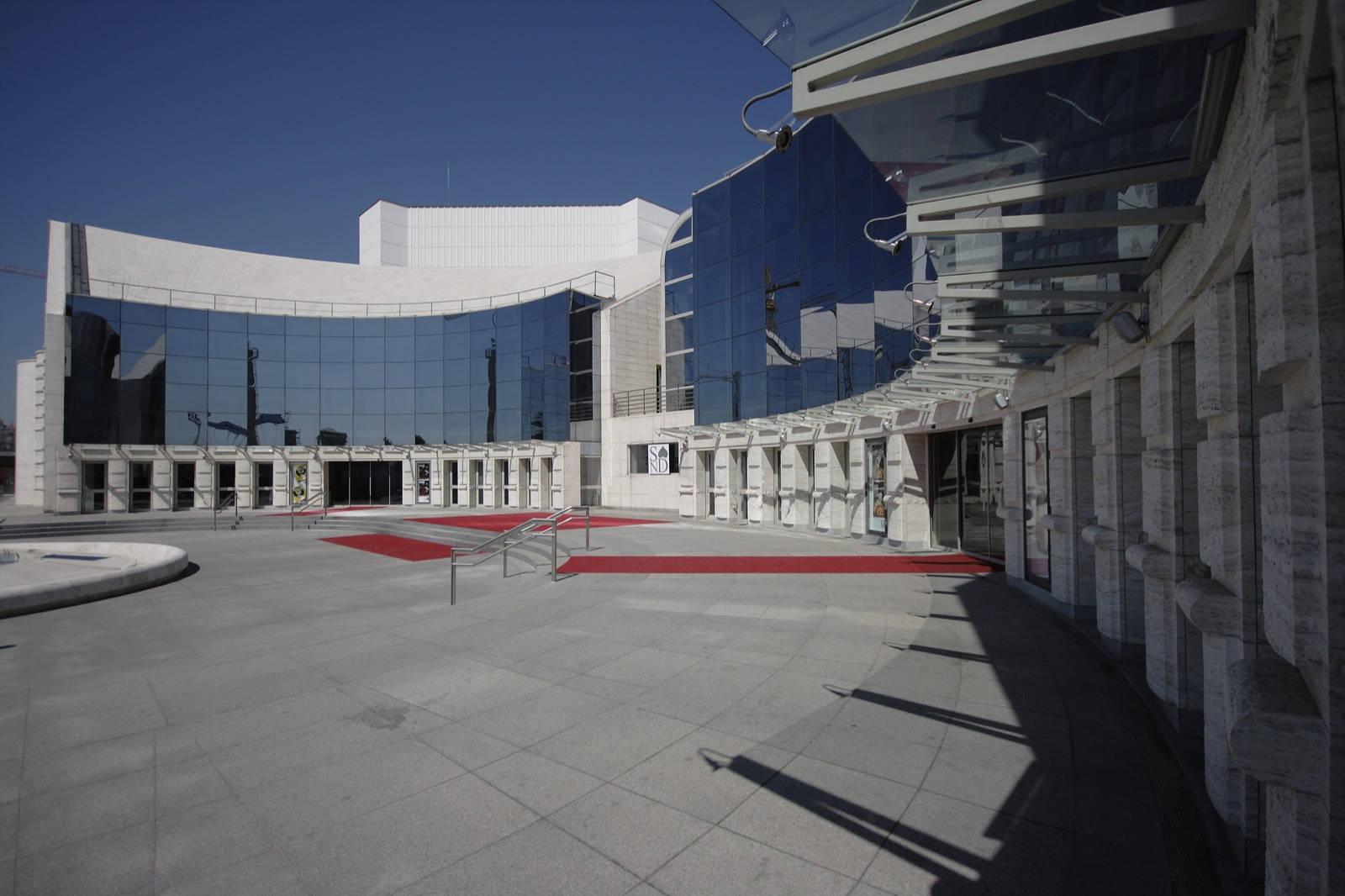
The new building of the Slovak National Theatre

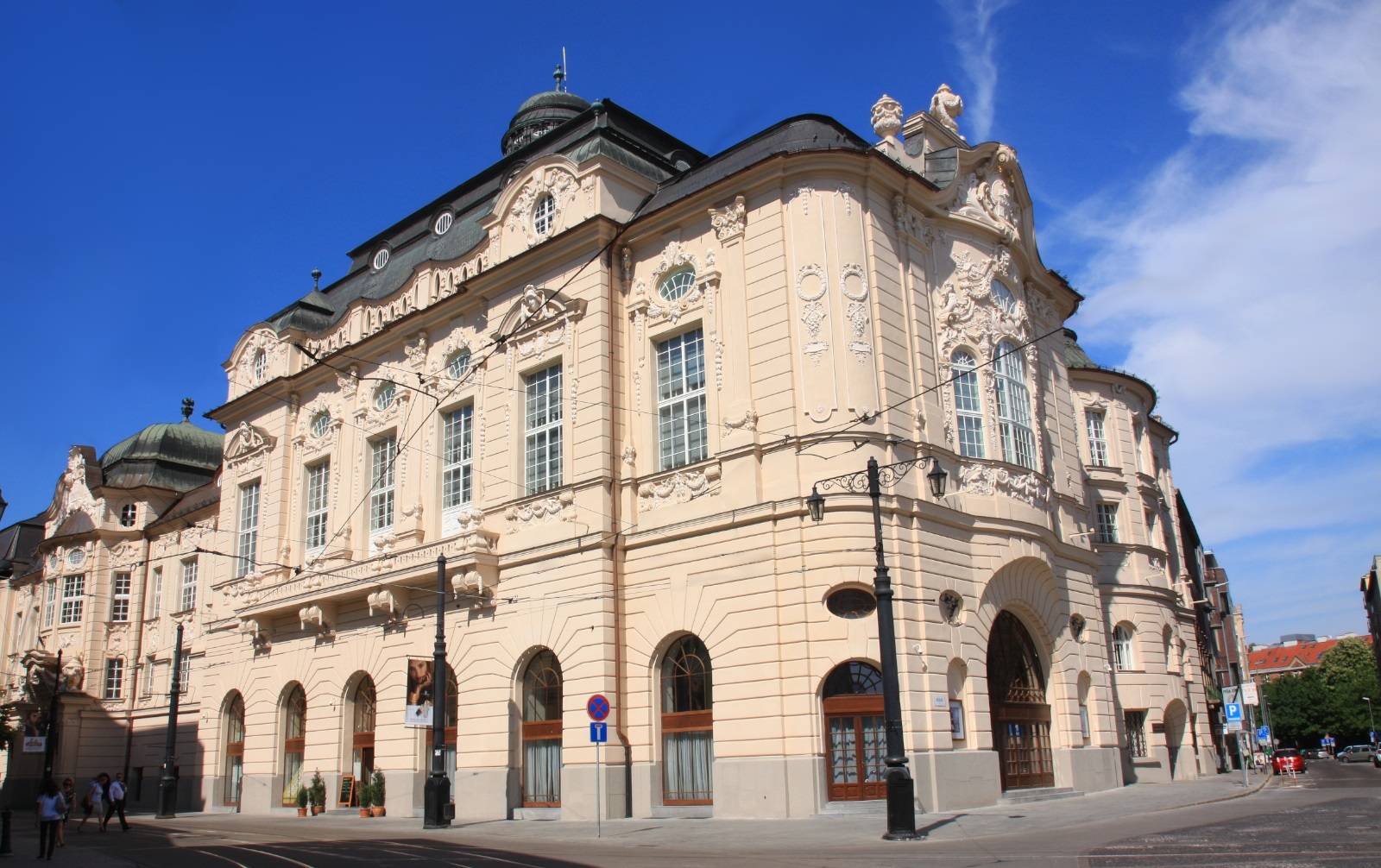
Slovak Philharmonic

=== Museums and galleries ===
The Slovak National Museum (Slovenské národné múzeum), founded in 1961, has its headquarters in Bratislava on the riverfront in the Old Town, along with the Natural History Museum, which is one of its subdivisions. It is the largest cultural institution in Slovakia, and manages 16 specialized museums in Bratislava and beyond. The Bratislava City Museum (Múzeum mesta Bratislavy), established in 1868, is the oldest museum in continuous operation in Slovakia. Its primary goal is to chronicle Bratislava's history in various forms from the earliest periods using historical and archaeological collections. It offers permanent displays in eight specialised museums.

The Slovak National Gallery, founded in 1948, offers the most extensive network of galleries in Slovakia. Two displays in Bratislava are next to one another at Esterházy Palace (Esterházyho palác) and the Water Barracks (Vodné kasárne) on the Danube riverfront in the Old Town. The Bratislava City Gallery, founded in 1961, is the second-largest Slovak gallery of its kind. The gallery offers permanent displays at Pálffy Palace (Pálffyho palác) and Mirbach Palace (Mirbachov palác), in the Old Town. Danubiana Art Museum, one of the youngest art museums in Europe, is near Čunovo waterworks.

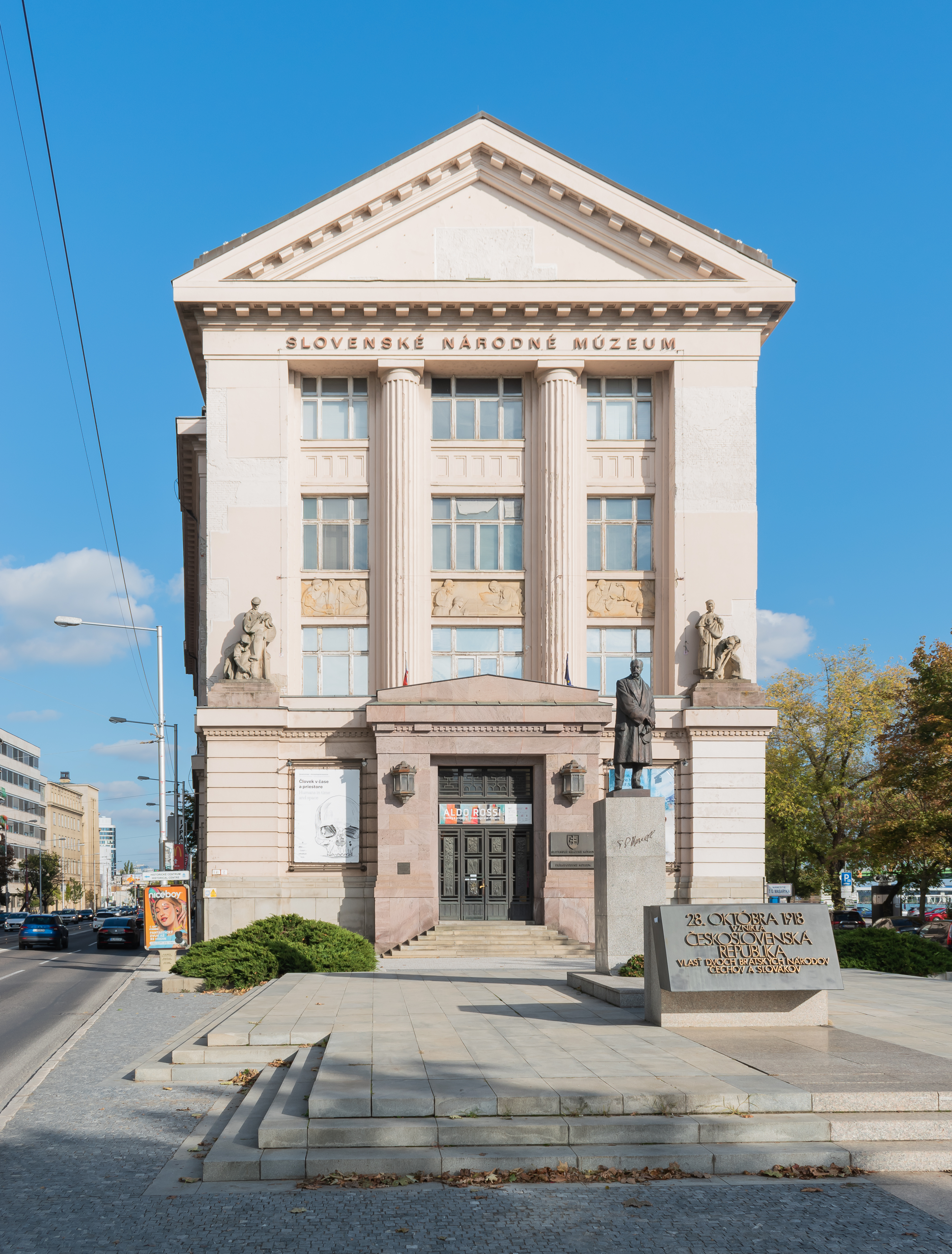
Slovak National Museum

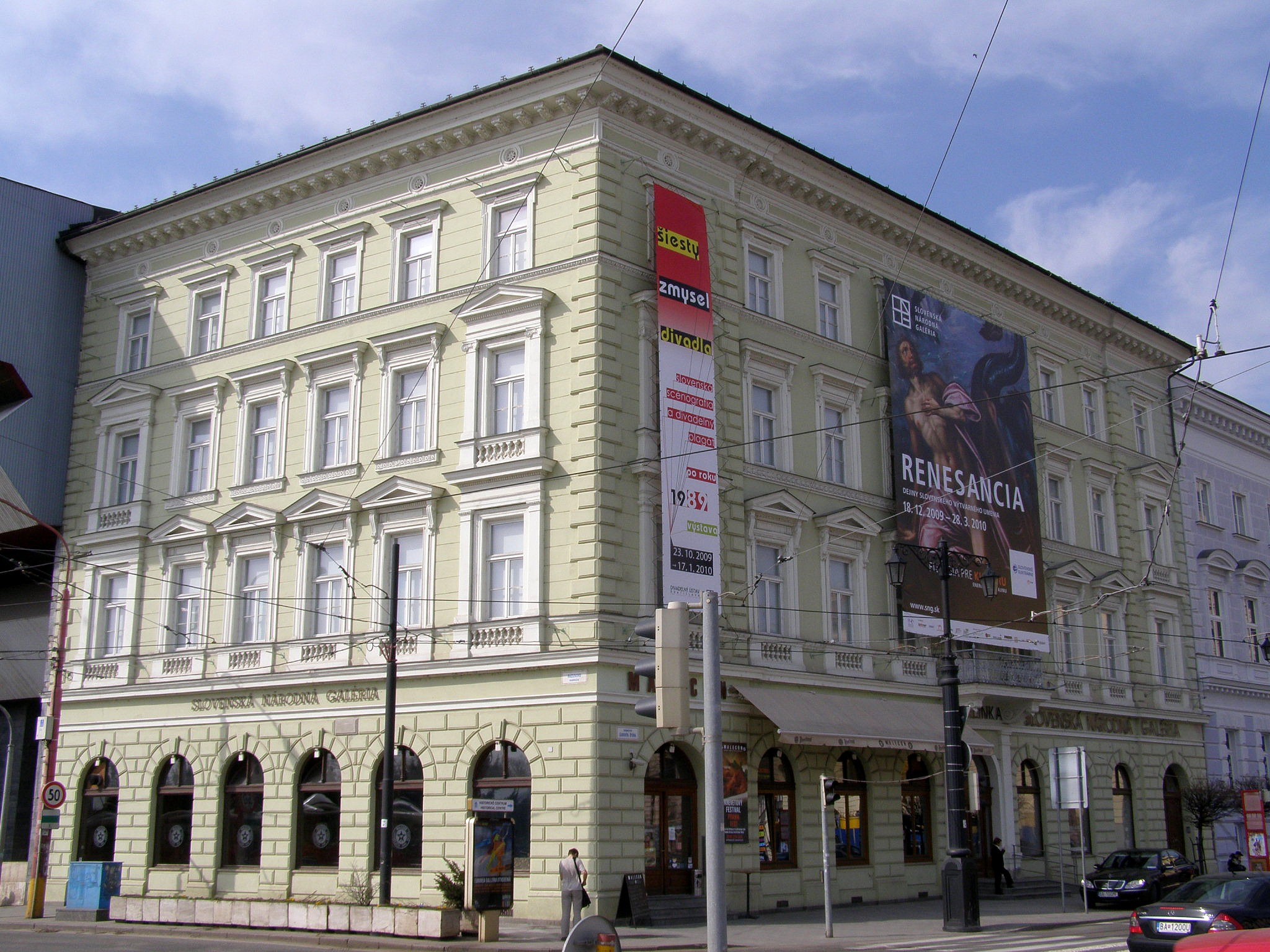
Slovak National Gallery

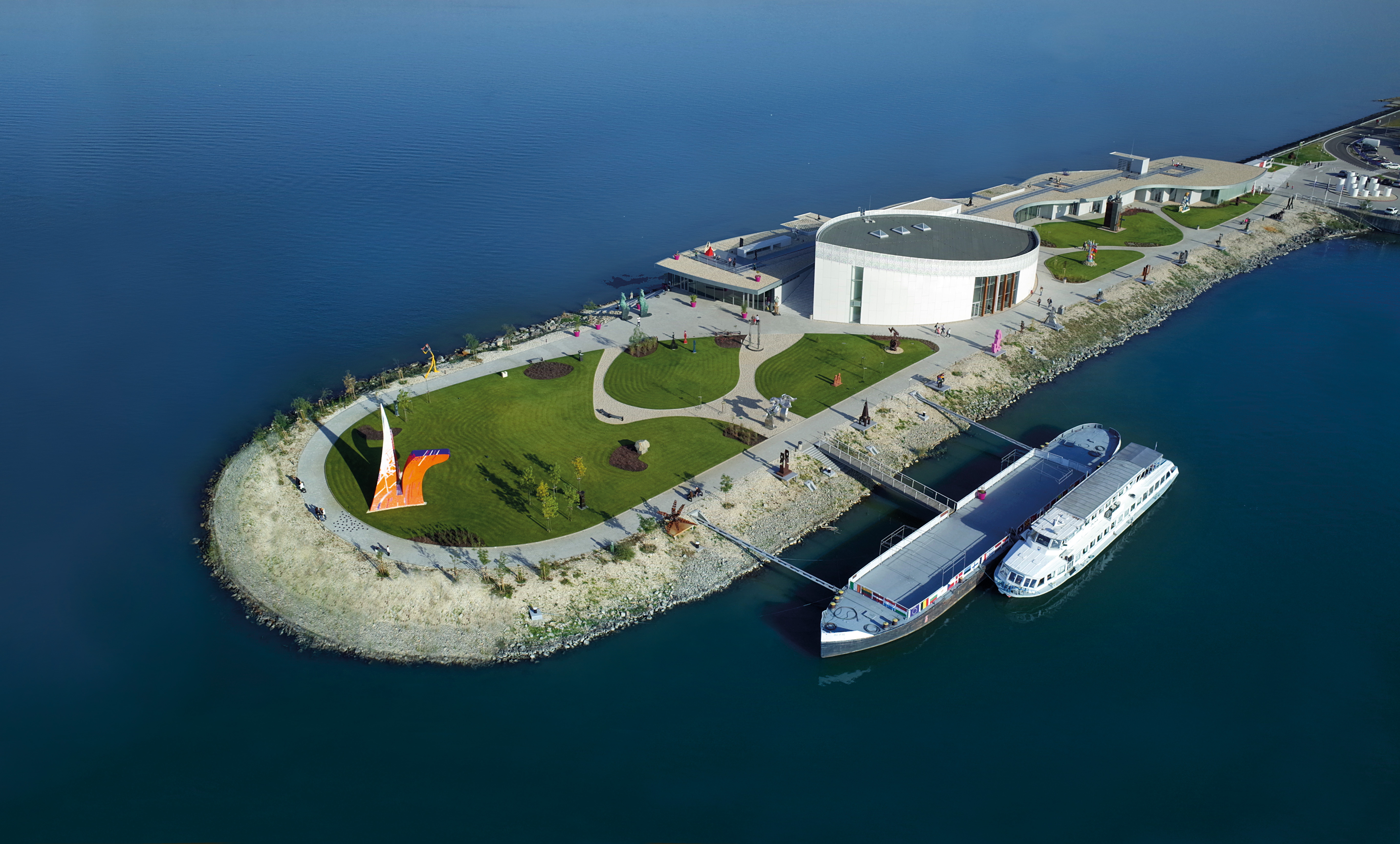
The Danubiana Meulensteen Art Museum, a museum of modern art at the river Danube

=== Media ===
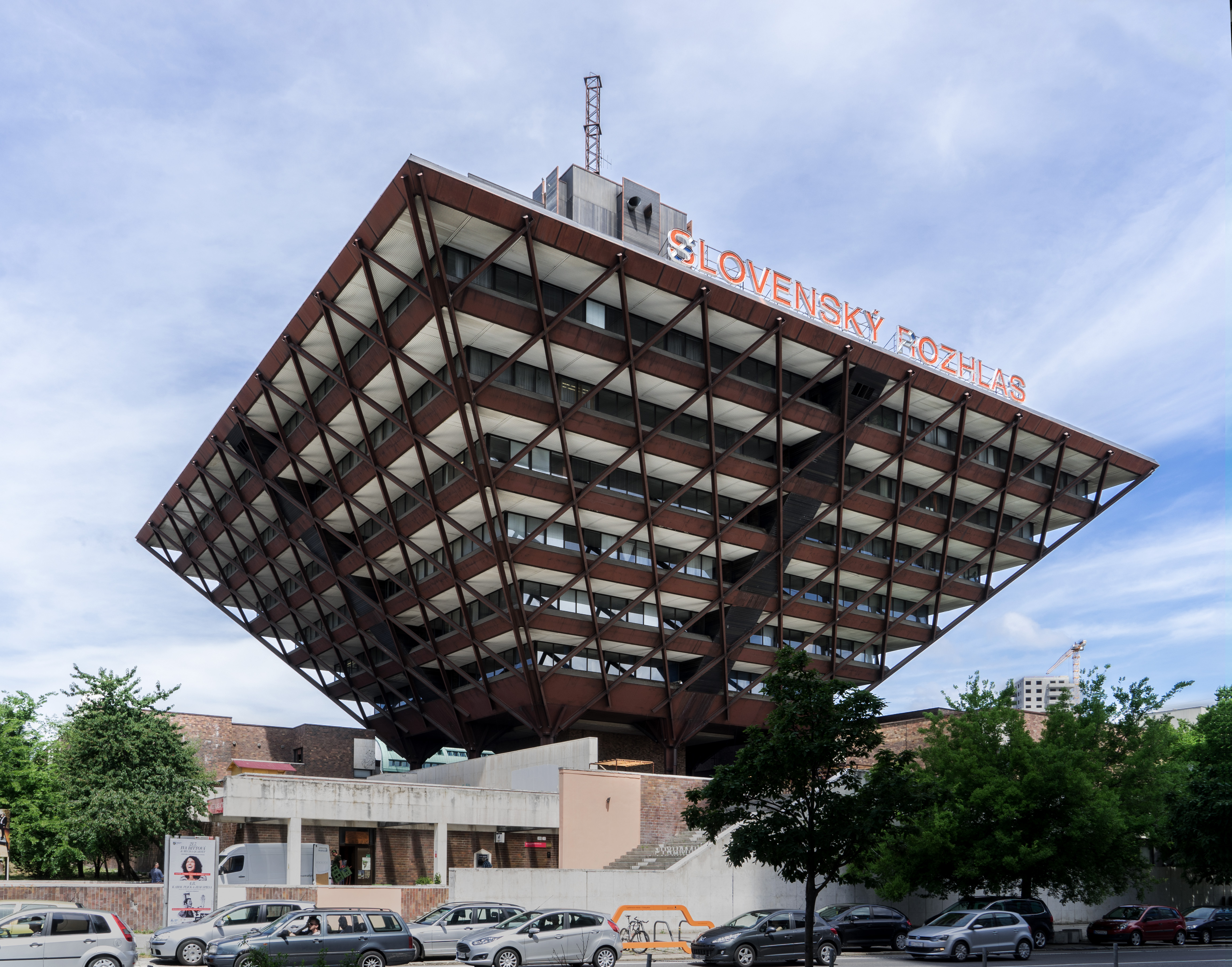
Slovak Radio Building

As the national capital, Bratislava is home to national and many local media outlets. Notable TV stations based in the city include Slovak Television and Radio (Slovenská televízia a rozhlas), Markíza, JOJ and TA3. STVR radio's headquarters has its seat in the centre, and many Slovak commercial radio stations are based in the city. National newspapers based in Bratislava include SME, Pravda, Nový čas, Hospodárske noviny and the English-language The Slovak Spectator. Two news agencies are headquartered there: the News Agency of the Slovak Republic (TASR, Tlačová agentúra Slovenskej republiky) and the Slovak News Agency (SITA, Slovenská tlačová agentúra).

== Sport ==
Various sports and sports teams have a long tradition in Bratislava, with many teams and individuals competing in Slovak and international leagues, tournaments, and competitions.

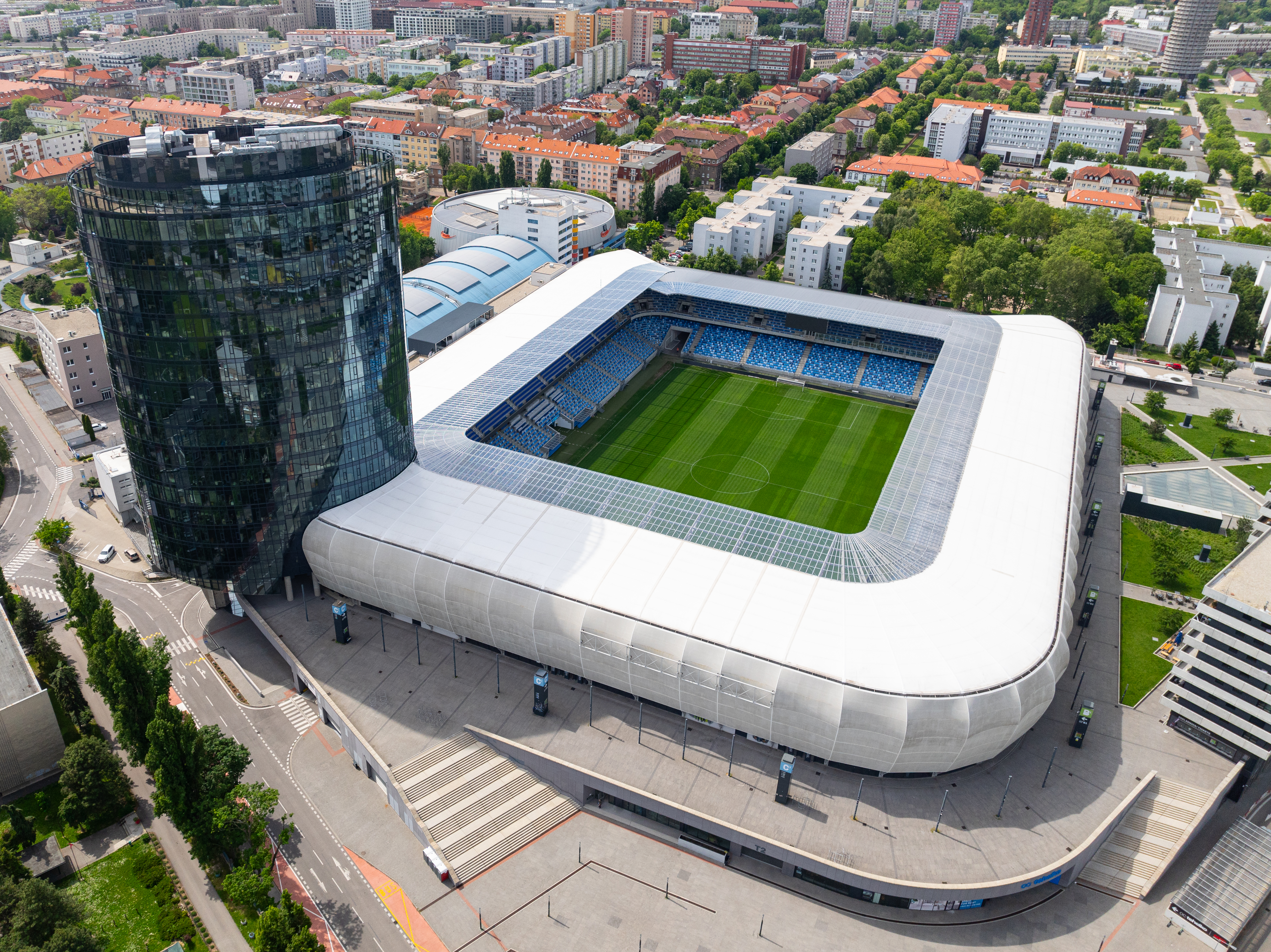
National football stadium

ŠK Slovan Bratislava, founded in 1919, has its home ground at the Tehelné pole stadium and is the only football club from Bratislava playing in the Slovak First Football League. ŠK Slovan is the most successful football club in Slovak history, being the only club from the former Czechoslovakia to win a UEFA competition, the Cup Winners' Cup in 1969. FC Petržalka is the oldest of Bratislava's football clubs, founded in 1898, and is based at Stadium FC Petržalka 1898 in Petržalka. They became the first Slovak side to win points in the UEFA Champions League group stage when they defeated FC Porto 3–2 in 2005. They play in the 2. Liga. Another known club from the city is FK Inter Bratislava, who won back to back championships in 2000 and 2001. Founded in 1945, they have their home ground at Stadium ŠKP Inter Dúbravka in Dúbravka, currently playing in the 3. liga.

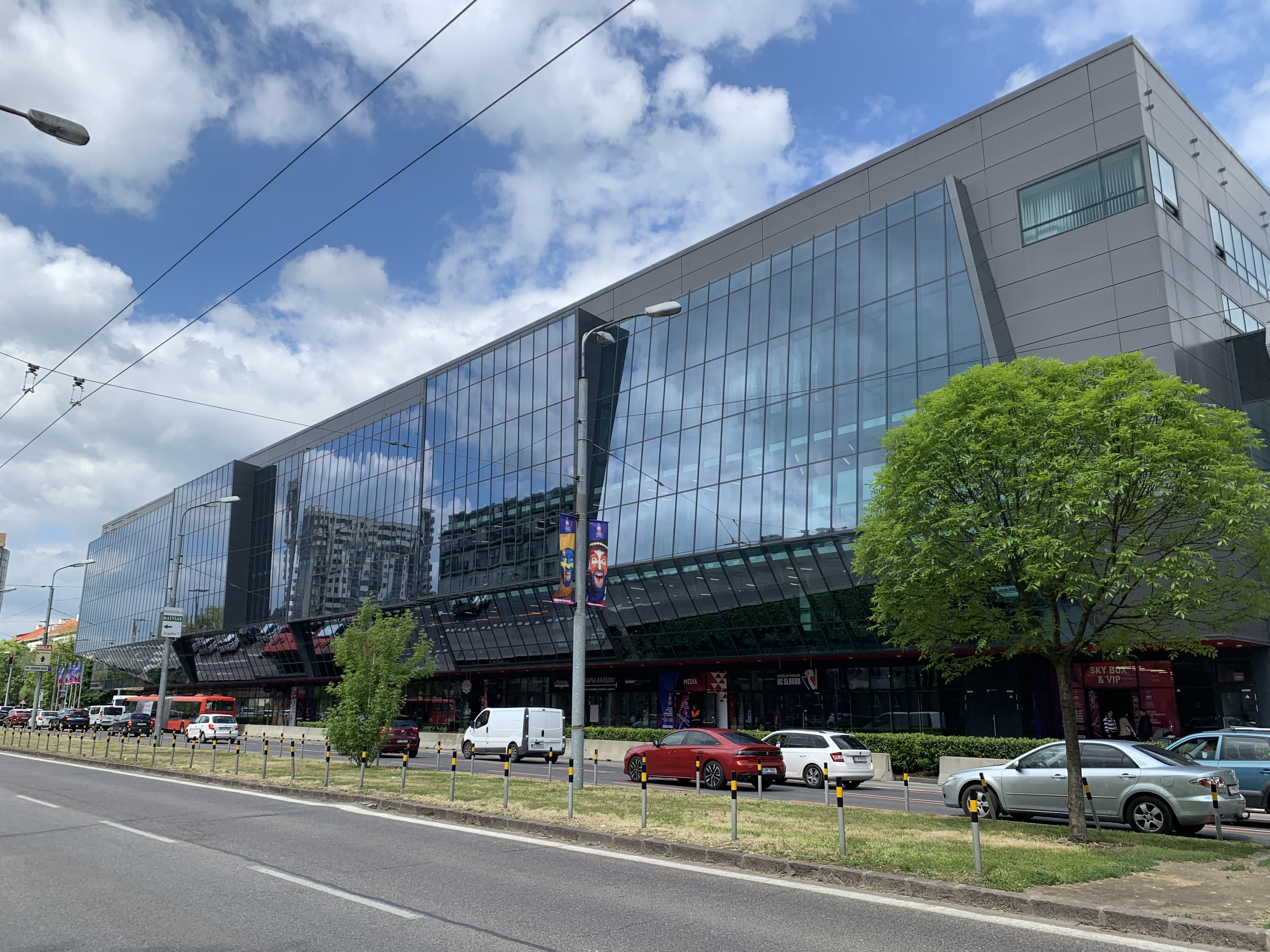
Ondrej Nepela Arena, ice-hockey and mixed use arena

Bratislava is home to winter sports arenas including Ondrej Nepela Arena and Vladimír Dzurilla Ice Stadium. The HC Slovan Bratislava ice hockey team plays at Ondrej Nepela Arena and represented Bratislava from the 2012–13 season to the 2018–19 season in the Kontinental Hockey League. While in Czechoslovakia, Bratislava co-hosted the Ice Hockey World Championships in 1959 and 1992 with Prague. Following Slovakia's independence, the city co-hosted the 2011 World Championship and 2019 World Championship with Košice.

The Čunovo Water Sports Centre is a whitewater slalom and rafting area, close to the Gabčíkovo dam. It hosts several international and national canoe and kayak competitions annually.

In 1966, Bratislava named its new multi-sports stadium after tennis player Ladislav Hecht.

The National Tennis Centre, which includes Peugeot Arena, hosts various cultural, sporting, and social events. Several Davis Cup matches have been played there, including the 2005 Davis Cup final. The city is represented in the top Slovak leagues in women's and men's basketball, women's handball and volleyball, and men's water polo. The Devín–Bratislava National run is the oldest athletic event in Slovakia, and the Bratislava City Marathon has been held annually since 2006. A race track is located in Petržalka, where horse racing and dog racing events and dog shows are held regularly.

Bratislava is also the centre of rugby union in Slovakia and motorcycle speedway previously existed at several venues throughout the city.

== Education and science ==
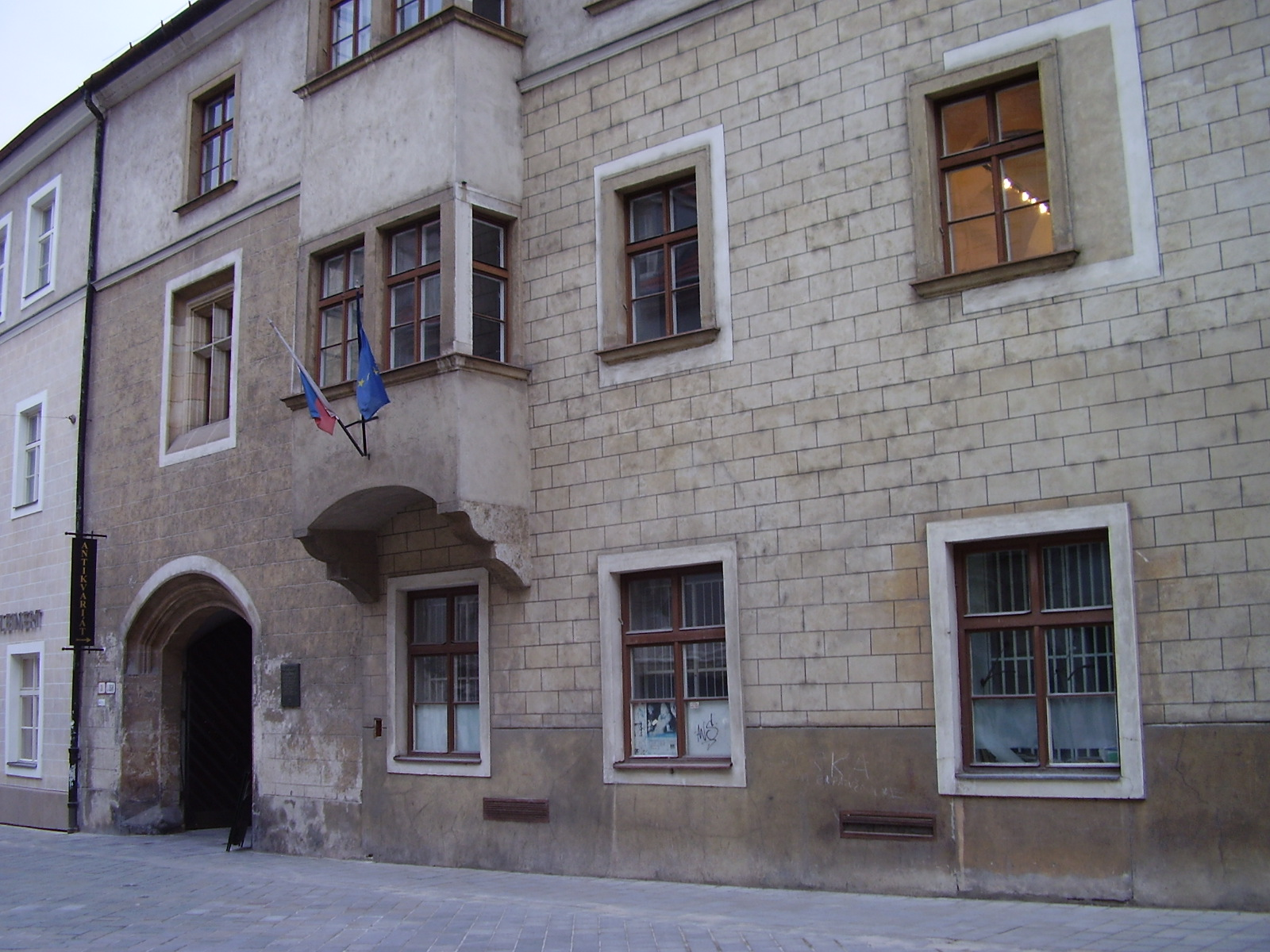
Universitas Istropolitana building

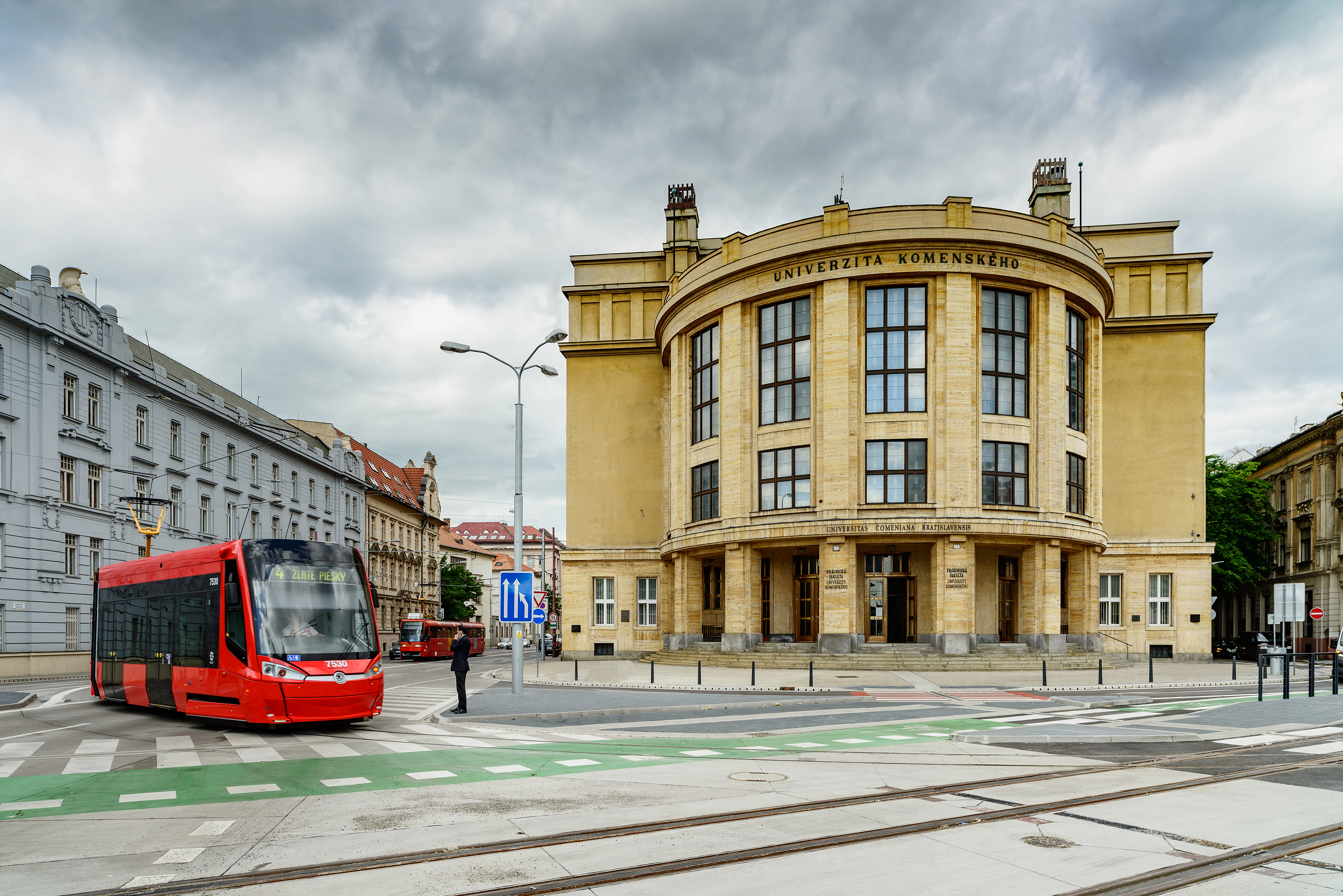
Comenius University headquarters at Šafárikovo námestie

The first university in Bratislava, in the Kingdom of Hungary (and also in the territory of present-day Slovakia) was Universitas Istropolitana, founded in 1465 by King Matthias Corvinus. It was closed in 1490 after his death.

Bratislava is the seat of the largest university (Comenius University in Bratislava, 27,771 students), the largest technical university (Slovak University of Technology in Bratislava, 18,473 students), and the oldest art schools (the Academy of Performing Arts, 1000 students and the Academy of Fine Arts and Design) in Slovakia. Other institutions of tertiary education are the public University of Economics and the first private college in Slovakia, City University of Seattle. In total, about 56,000 students attend university in Bratislava.

There are 65 public primary schools, nine private primary schools and ten religious primary schools. Overall, they enroll 25,821 pupils. The city's system of secondary education (some middle schools and all high schools) consists of 39 gymnasia with 16,048 students, 37 specialized high schools with 10,373 students, and 27 vocational schools with 8,863 students (data as of 2007).

The Slovak Academy of Sciences is also based in Bratislava. However, the city is one of the few European capitals to have neither an observatory nor a planetarium. The nearest observatory is in Modra, 30 kilometres (19 mi) away, and the nearest planetarium is in Vienna, 50 kilometres (31 mi) away. The nearest planetarium to Bratislava within Slovakia's borders is in Hlohovec, 70 kilometres (43 mi) away.

== Transport ==
The geographical position of Bratislava in Central Europe has long made it a natural crossroads for international trade traffic.

=== Public transport ===
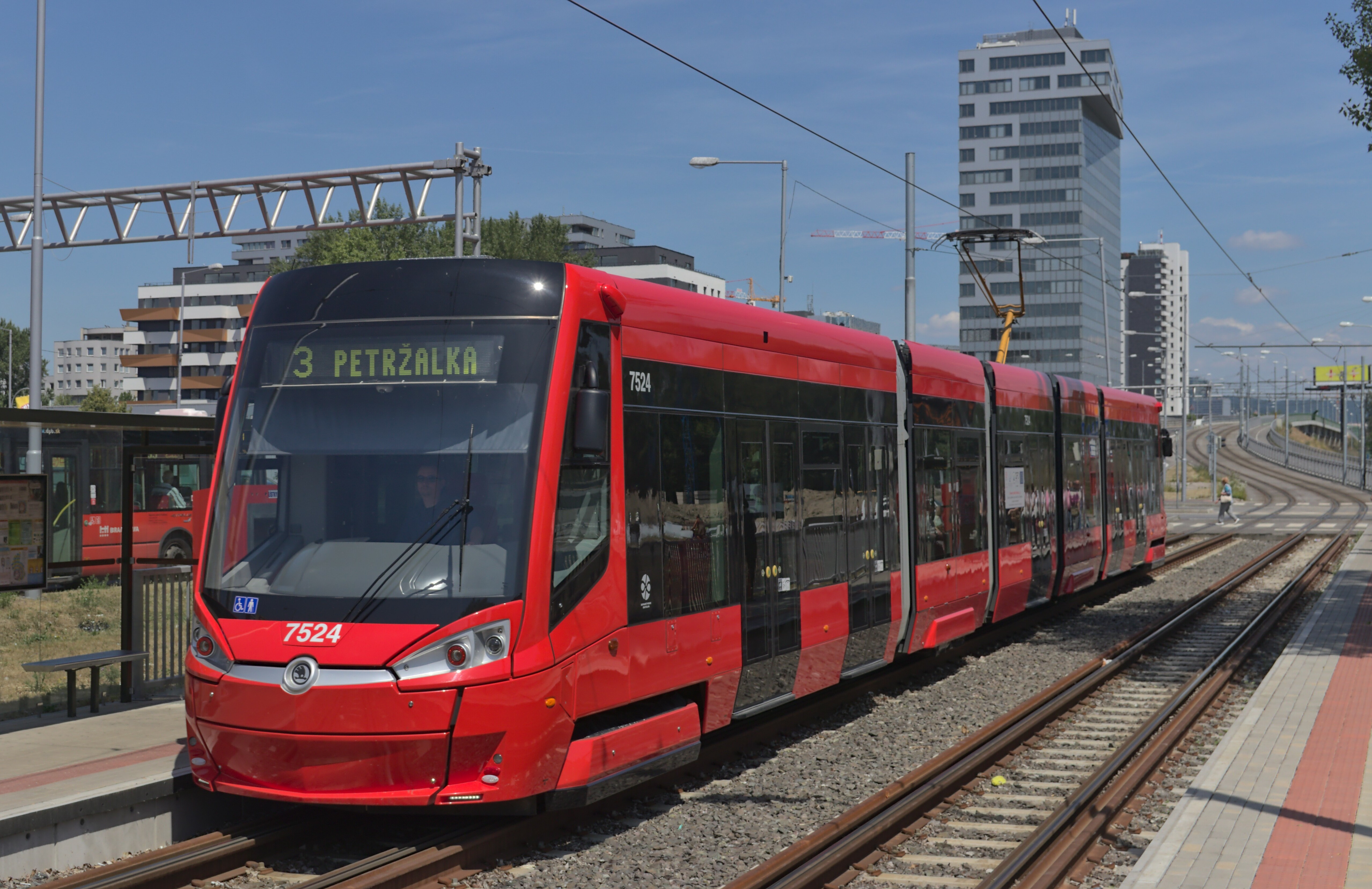
Škoda 30 T tram in Bratislava

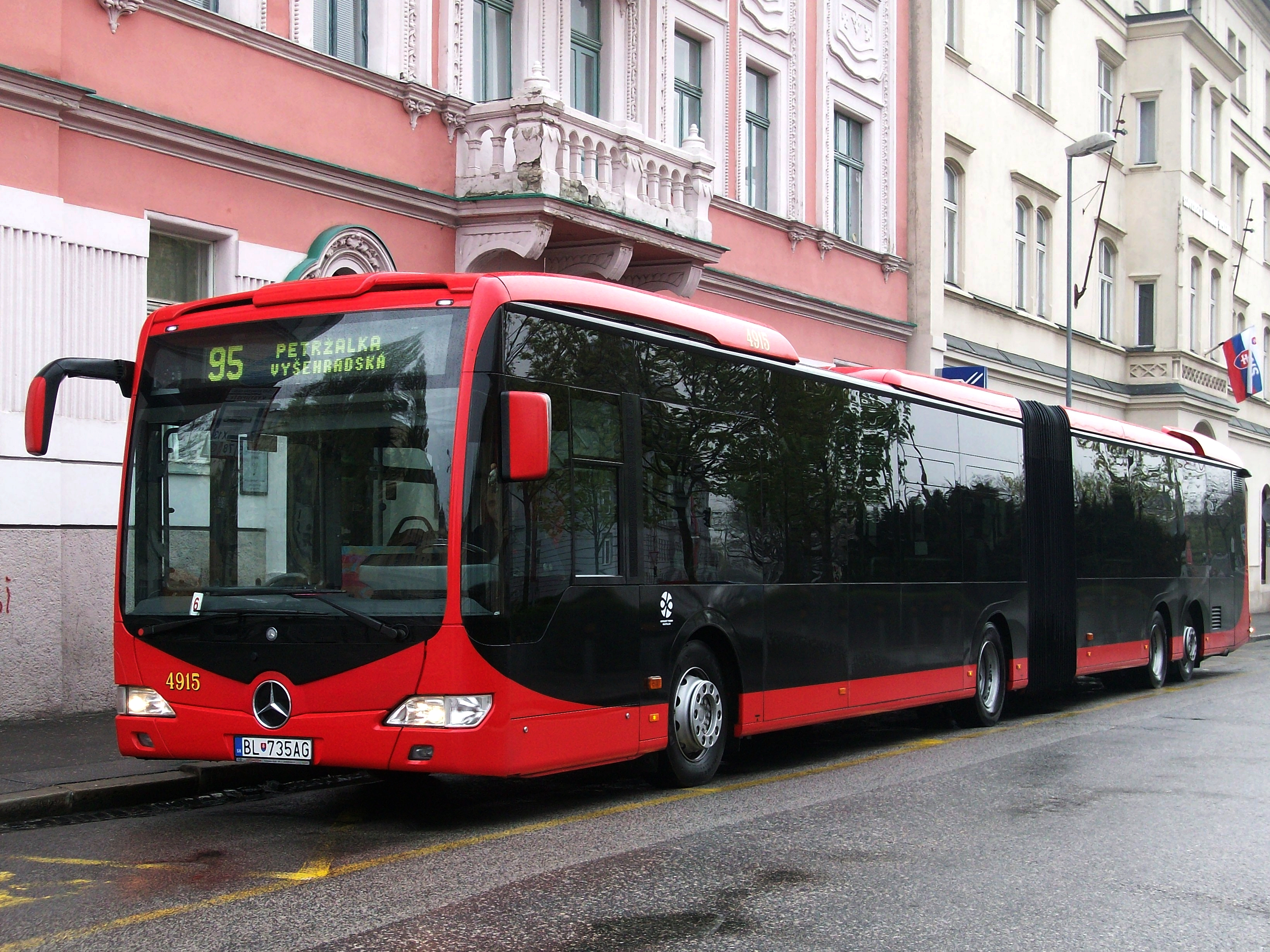
A typical red bus in Bratislava

Public transport in Bratislava is managed by Dopravný podnik Bratislava, a city-owned company. The transport system is known as Mestská hromadná doprava (MHD, Municipal Mass Transit) and employs buses, trams, and trolleybuses. Most of the Bratislava public transport is coated in a typical colour combination of red and black.

Bratislava is also part of an integrated system, IDS BK, connecting city public transport with other transport companies in the Bratislava region. Traveling with a single ticket is possible throughout the system network, both in Bratislava and to the nearby villages and cities, including three other districts of Senec, Malacky, and Pezinok.

=== Rail ===
As a rail hub, the city has direct connections to Austria, Hungary, the Czech Republic, Poland, Germany, Croatia, Slovenia, and the rest of Slovakia. Bratislava-Petržalka and Bratislava hlavná stanica are the principal railway stations.

Daily trains and buses from Bratislava to Vienna run multiple times every hour, with the Wien Hbf train station serving Bratislava as well, with more connections throughout Europe, opening possibilities for travel to Italy and France with a quick change of trains in Vienna.

=== Busses ===
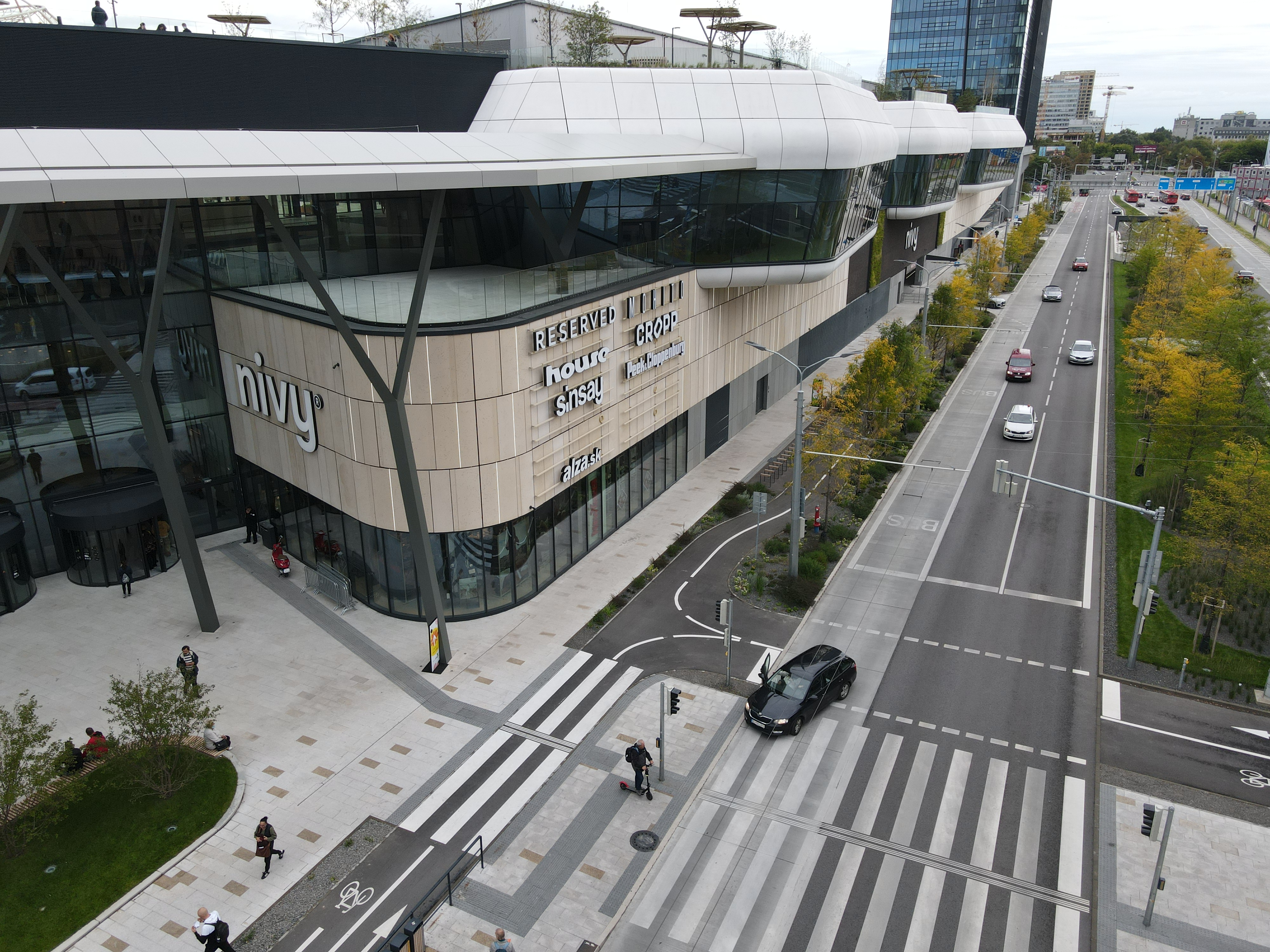
Nivy is a mixed-use complex with an underground international bus station opened in 2021.

The main bus station (Autobusová stanica or Autobusová stanica Nivy) is located at Mlynské Nivy, east of the city centre, and offers both bus connections to cities in Slovakia and international bus lines. A new bus station attached to a shopping mall, administration centre, and Bratislava's tallest skyscraper, Nivy Tower, was opened on 30 September 2021. The bus station lies underground and its design was inspired by airport terminals. The waiting area offers enough space and comfort to wait for the bus.

=== Roads ===
The motorway system provides direct access to Brno in the Czech Republic, Vienna in Austria, Budapest in Hungary, Trnava, and other points in Slovakia. The A6 motorway between Bratislava and Vienna was opened in November 2007.

=== Port ===
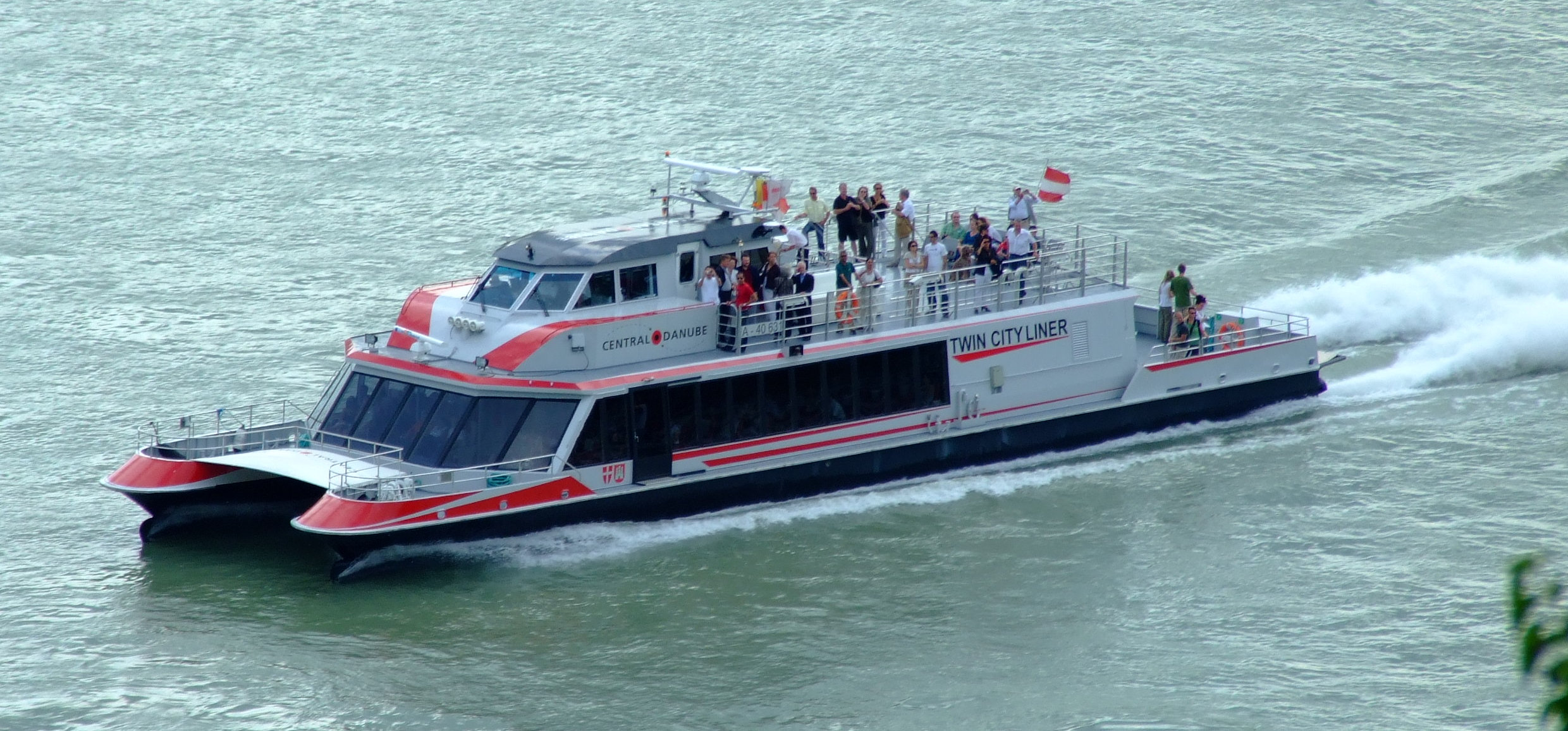
Twin City Liner express boat on the Danube, connecting Bratislava with Vienna

The Port of Bratislava is one of the two international river ports in Slovakia. The port provides access to the Black Sea via the Danube and to the North Sea through the Rhine–Main–Danube Canal. Additionally, tourist lines operate from Bratislava's passenger port, including routes to Devín, Vienna, and elsewhere. In Bratislava there are currently six bridges standing over the Danube (ordered by the flow of the river): Most Lafranconi (Lafranconi Bridge), Most SNP (Bridge of the Slovak National Uprising, previously called Nový most or New bridge) with the famous UFO Tower, Starý most (The Old Bridge), Most Apollo (Apollo Bridge), Prístavný most (The Harbor Bridge) and Lužný most (The Floodplain bridge).

=== Air ===
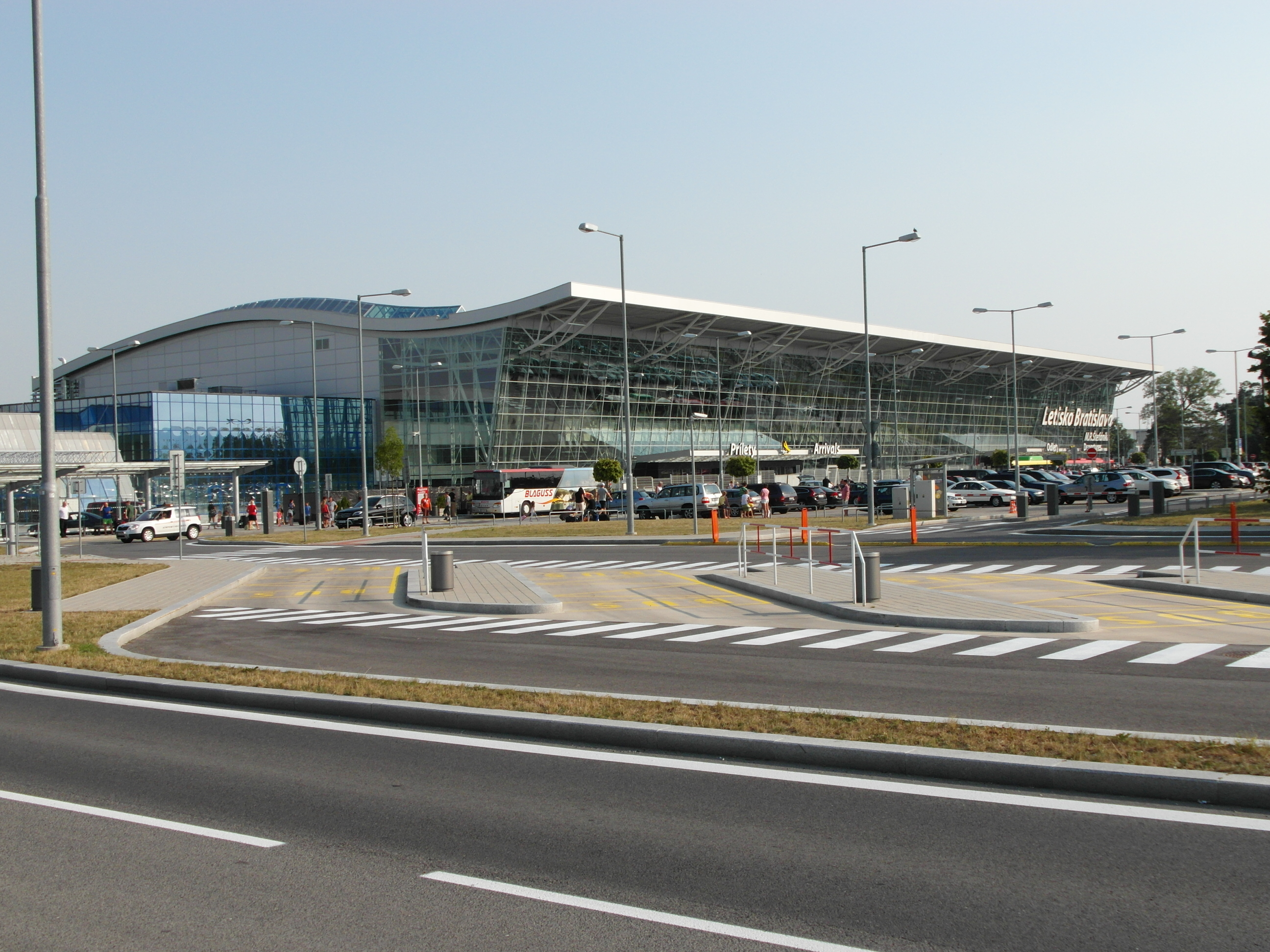
Terminal building at Bratislava Airport (BTS)

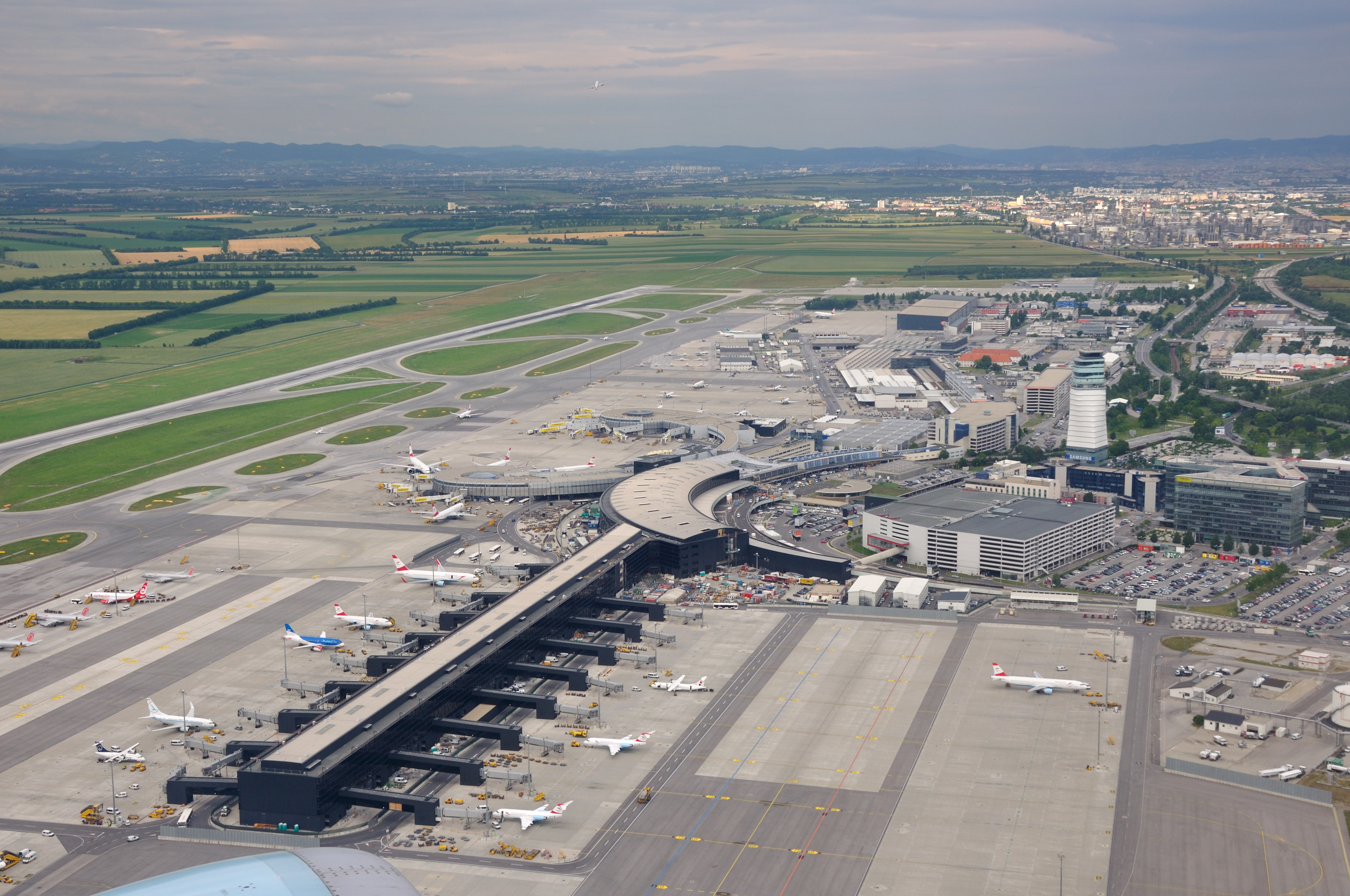
Bratislava is also served by the Vienna International Airport (VIE), located 49 kilometres (30.4 mi) west of the city centre.

Bratislava's M. R. Štefánik Airport is the main international airport in Slovakia. The airport is located 9 kilometres (5.6 mi) north-east of the city centre, with fast connections served by the city's public transport. It serves civil and governmental, scheduled and unscheduled domestic and international flights. The current runways support the landing for all common types of aircraft. It served 2,024,000 passengers in 2007. Bratislava is also served by the Vienna International Airport located 49 kilometres (30.4 mi) west of the city centre. It is common for Bratislava residents to use the Vienna airport often, as it offers more variety and can be reached in under 60 minutes from Bratislava by car.

== International relations ==
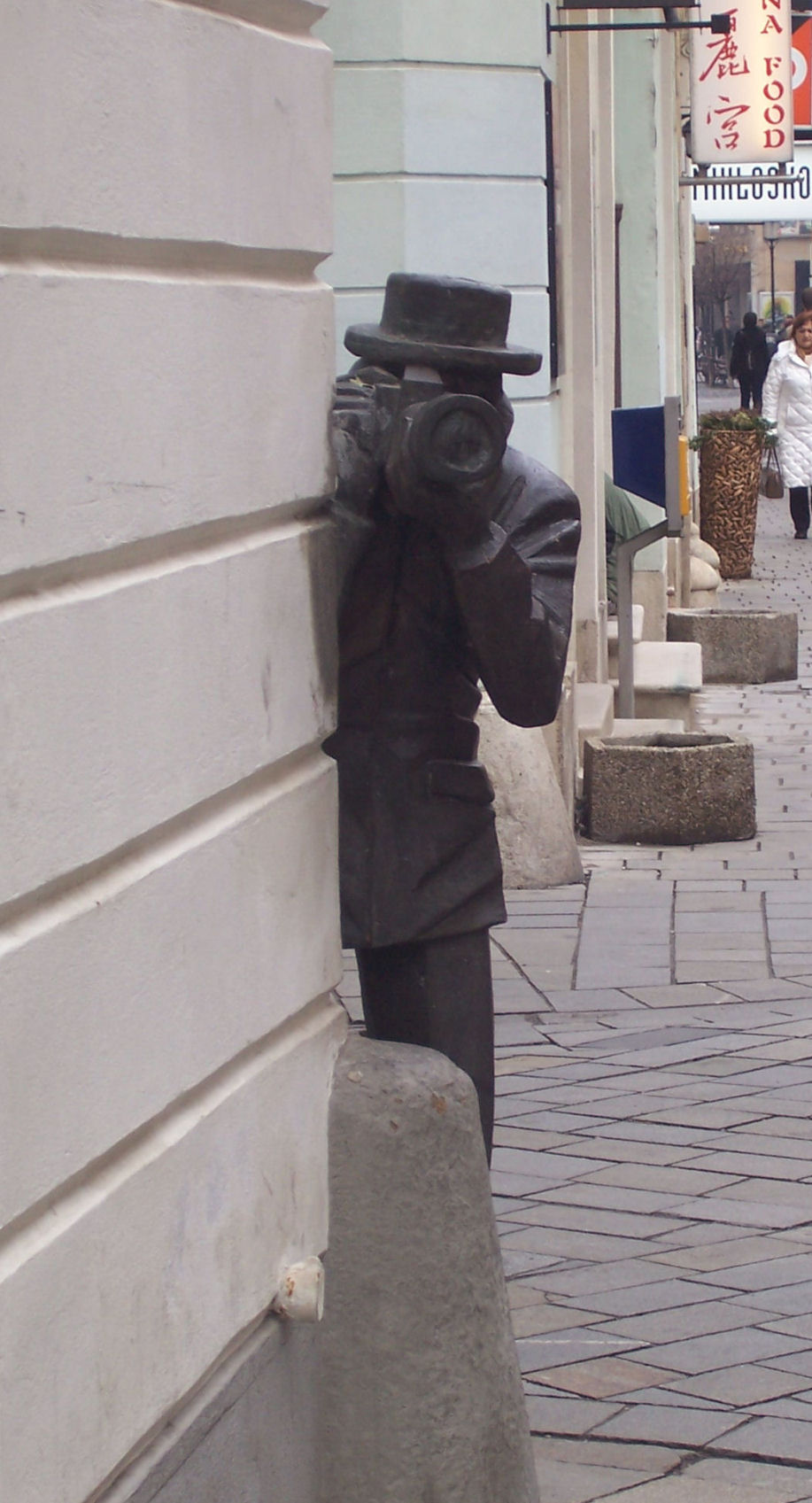
Paparazzi statue in Bratislava's Old Town

=== Twin towns – sister cities ===
Bratislava is twinned with the towns and cities:

- Brno, Czech Republic
- Székesfehérvár, Hungary
- Kraków, Poland
- Warsaw, Poland
- Perugia, Italy (1962)
- Ljubljana, Slovenia (1967)
- Yerevan, Armenia (2001)
- Larnaca, Cyprus (1989)
- Turku, Finland (1976)
- Bremen, Germany (1989)
- Alexandria, Egypt
- Kyiv, Ukraine
- Cleveland, United States

* Numbers in parentheses list the year of twinning. The first agreement was signed with the city of Perugia in Italy on July 18, 1962.

== Notable people ==
=== Honorary citizens ===
People who have received the honorary citizenship of Bratislava are:

Date	Name	Notes
4 September 1990	Helmut Zilk	Mayor of Vienna
24 September 1997	Edita Gruberová	Sopranist
19 November 2009	Václav Havel (1936–2011)	President of Czechoslovakia 1989–1992 and President of the Czech Republic 1993–2003
26 September 2011	Major General Roy Martin Umbarger	United States Army Officer
28 October 2014	Karel Gott	Czech singer
19 December 2020	John Paul II	Catholic Pope

== Gallery ==
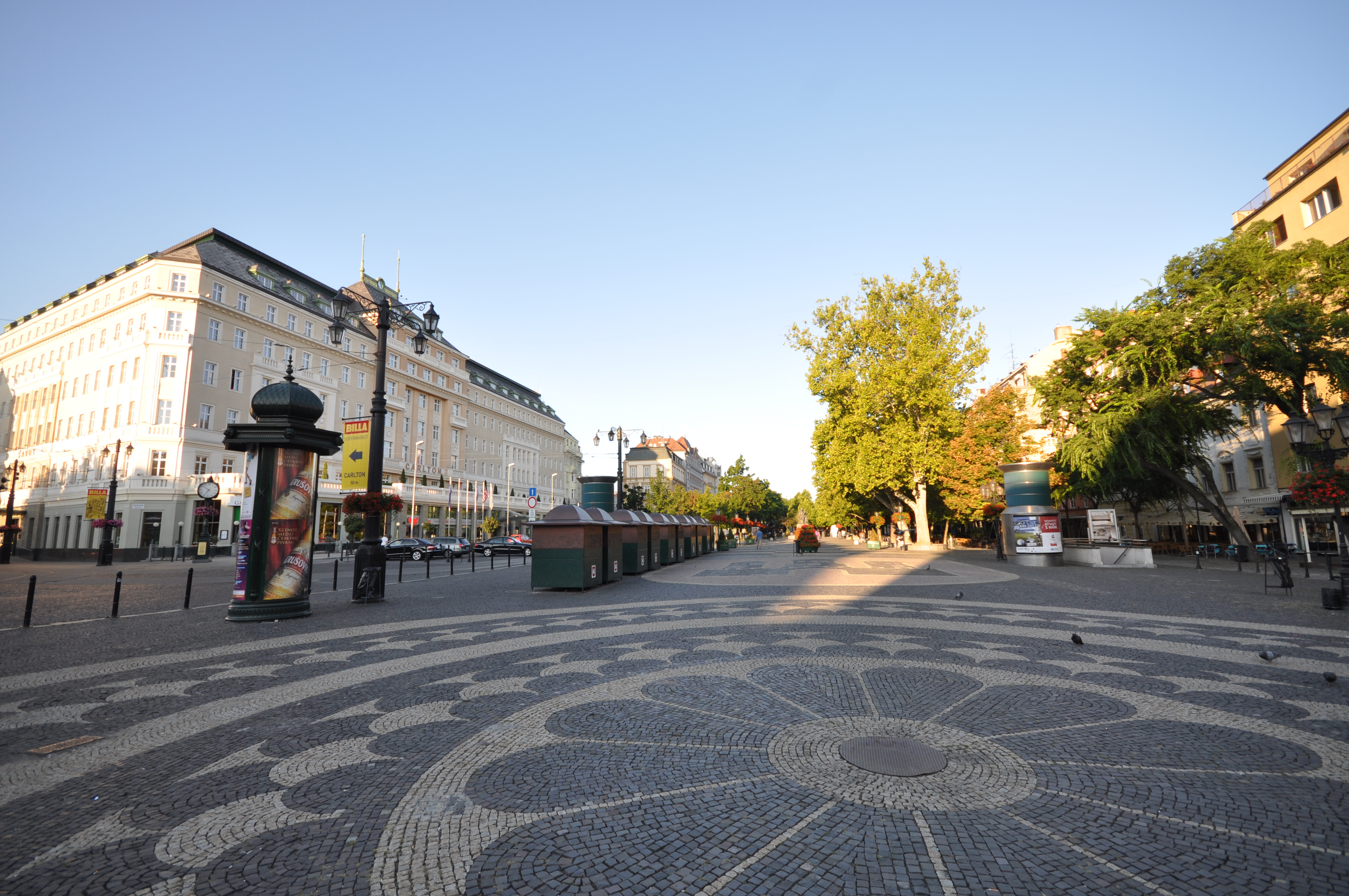
Hviezdoslav Square

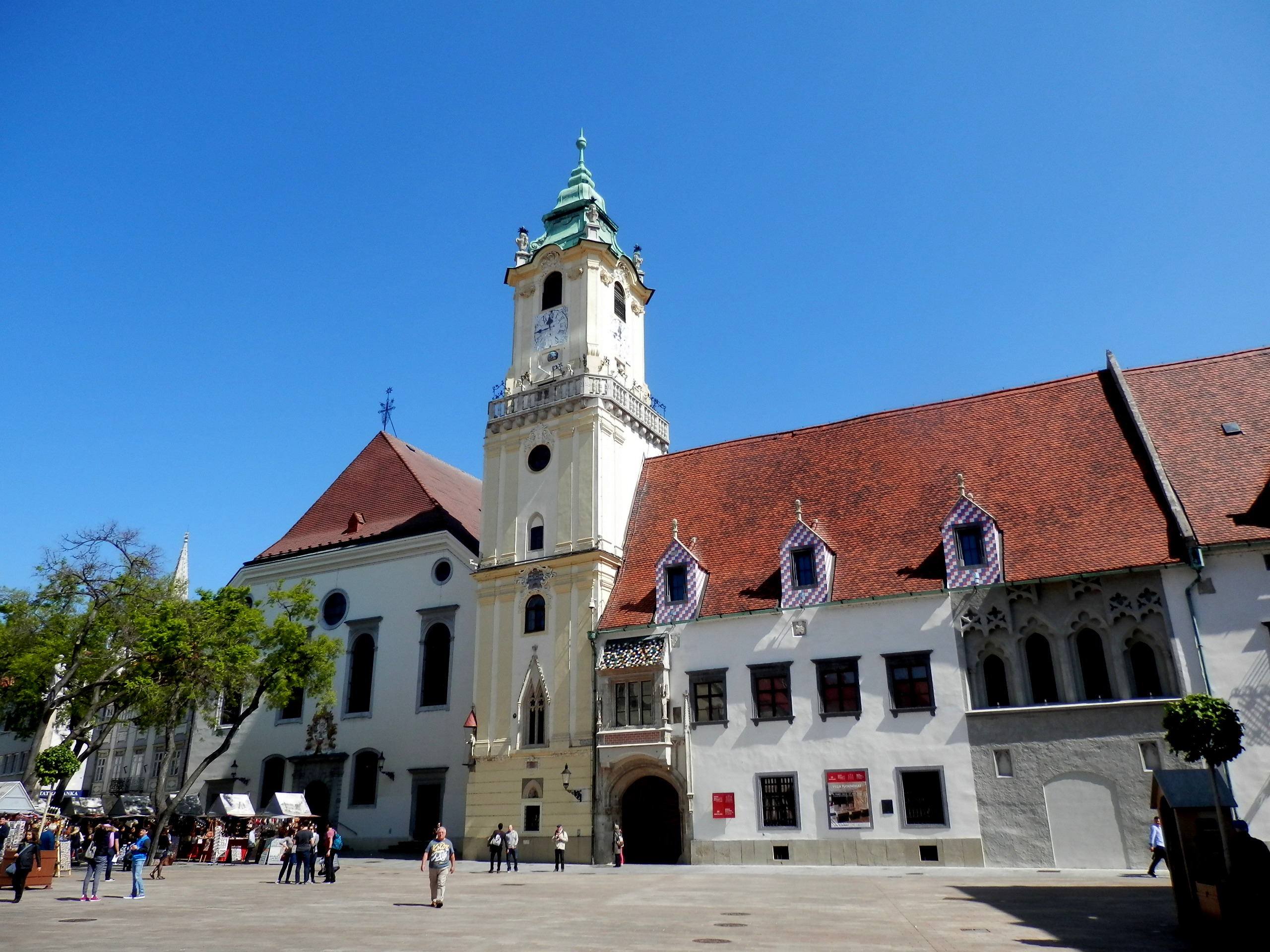
The Old Town Hall, the oldest city hall in the country

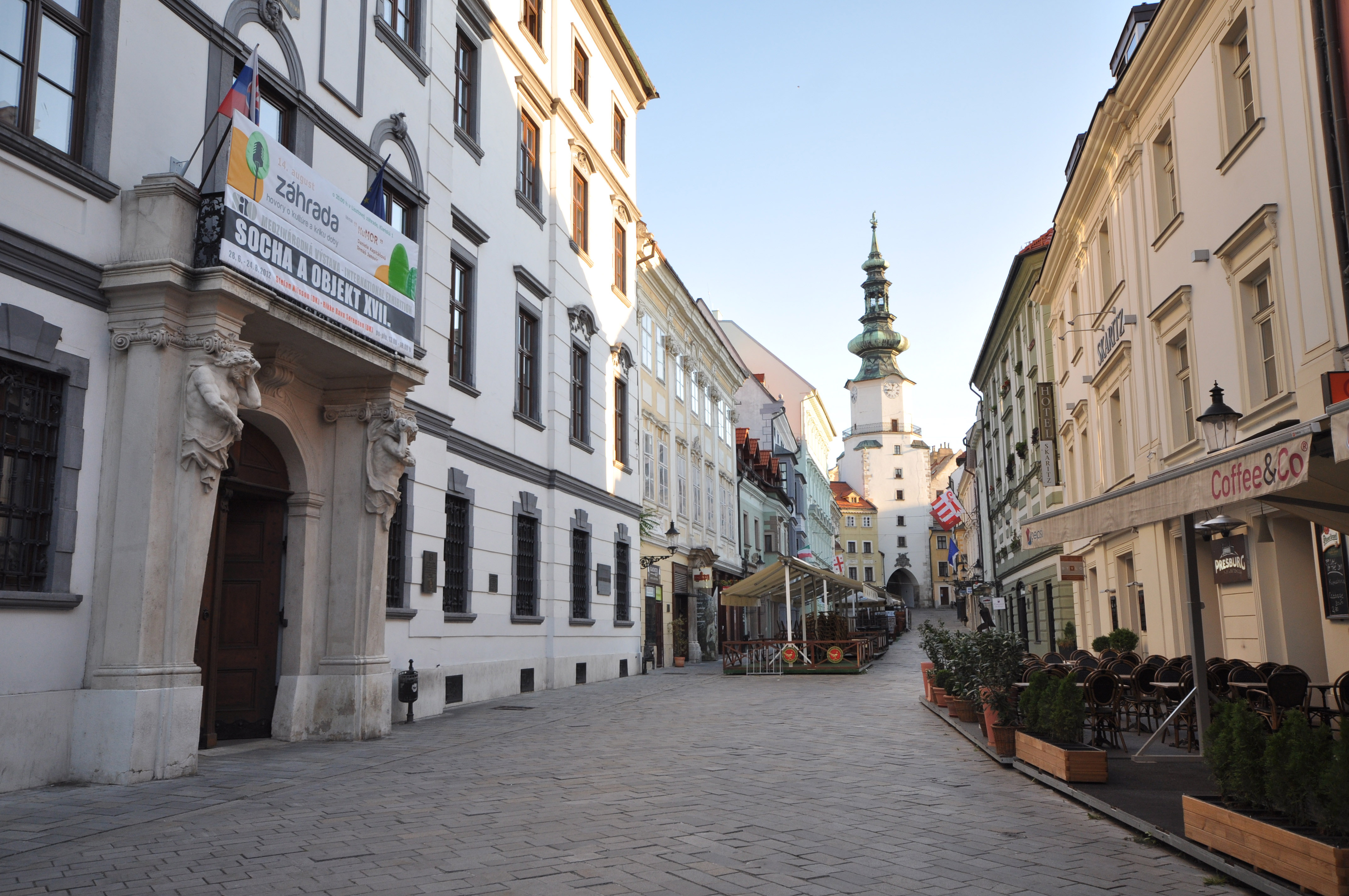
Michael's Gate

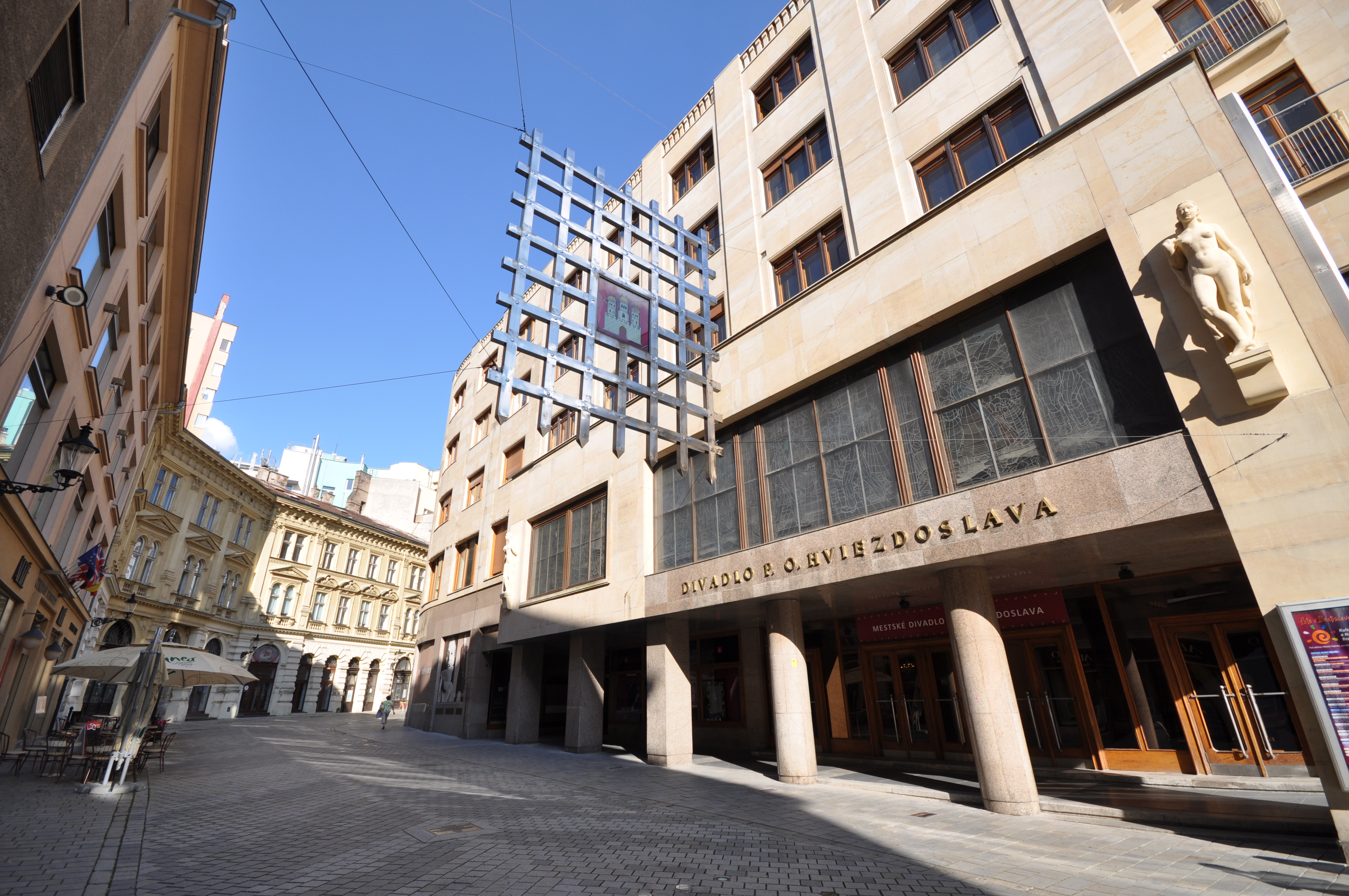
Laurinc Gate

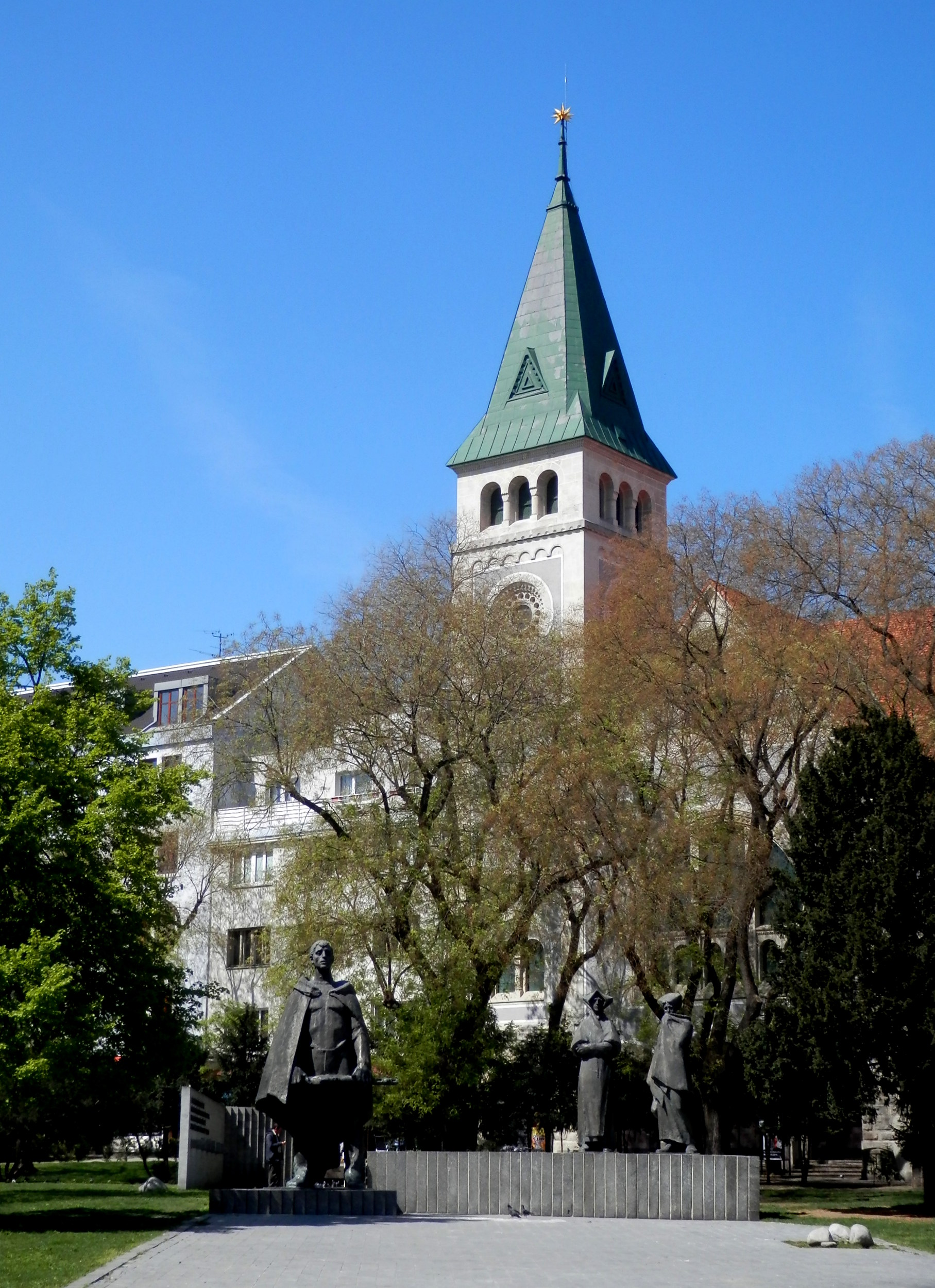
Reformed church

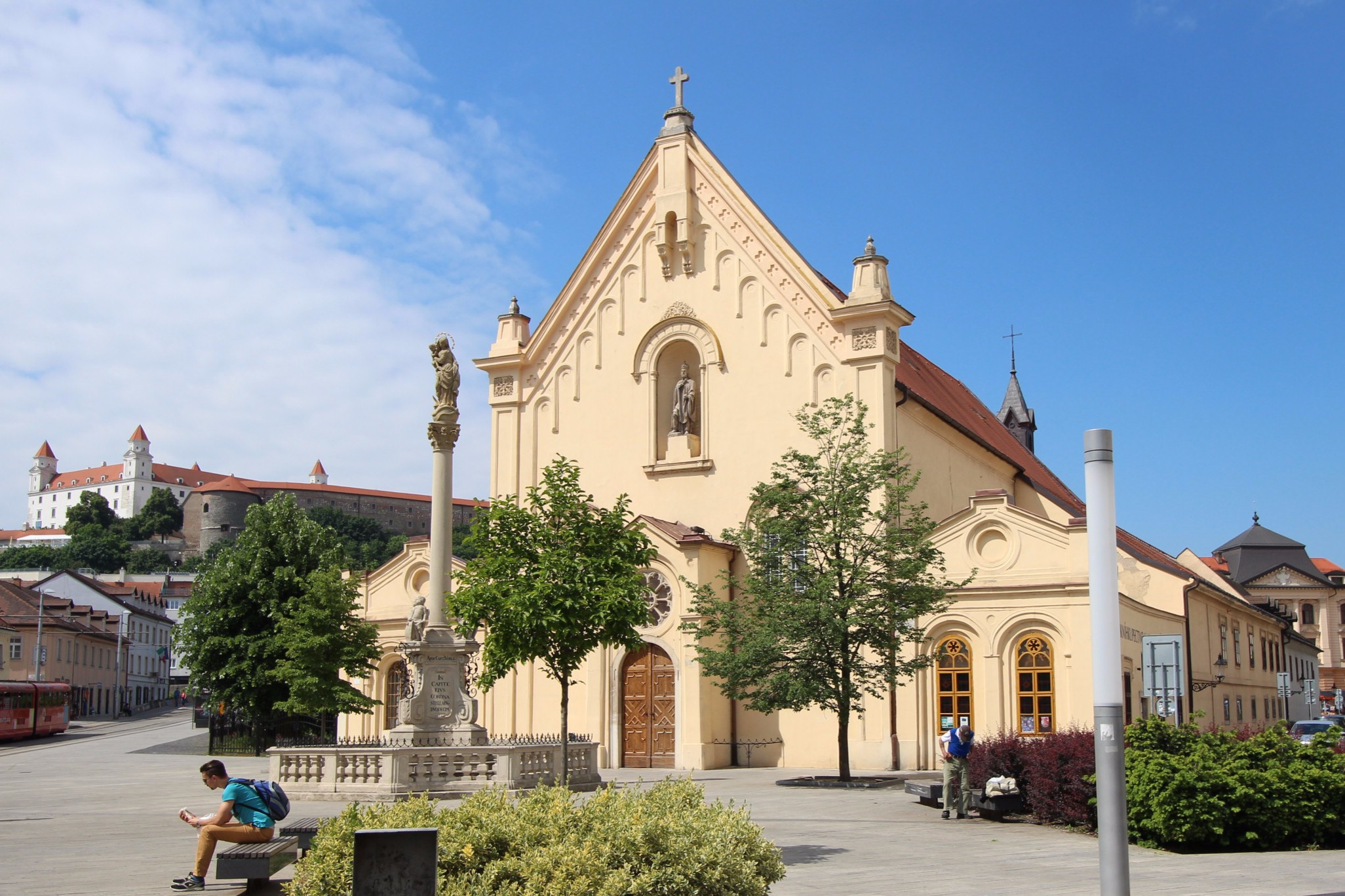
Church of Saint Stephen

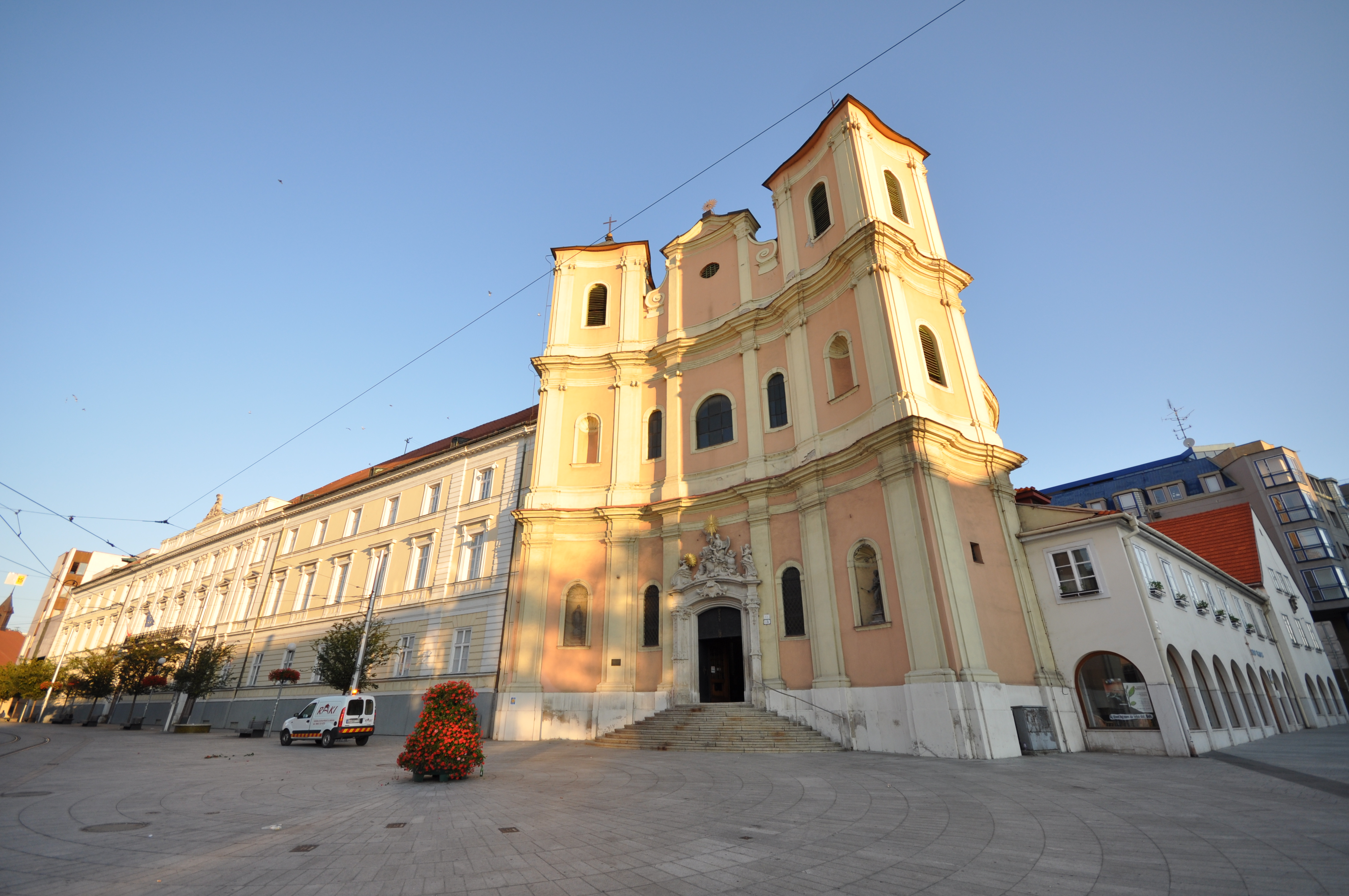
Trinitarian Church

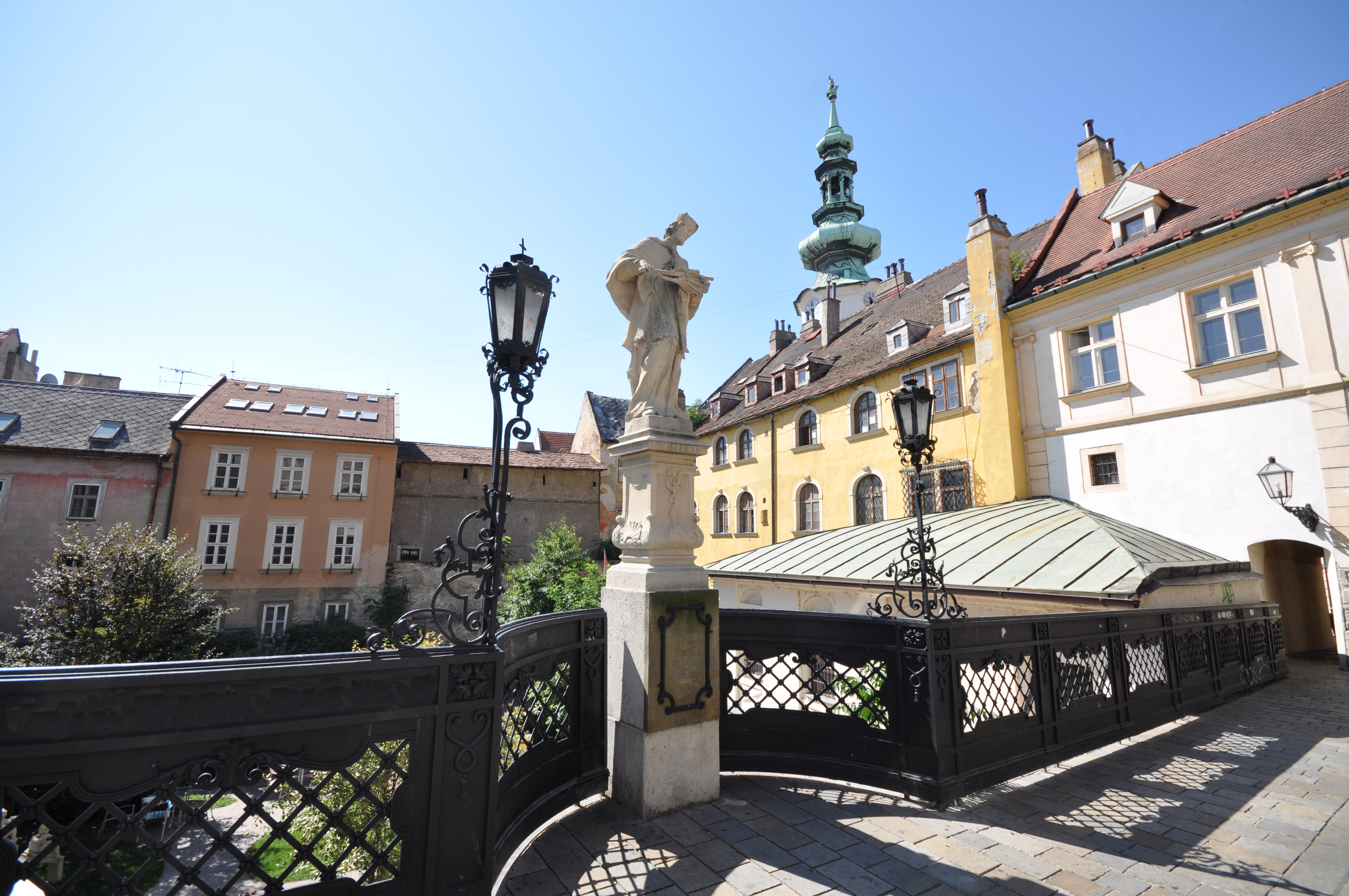
The Old Town of Bratislava

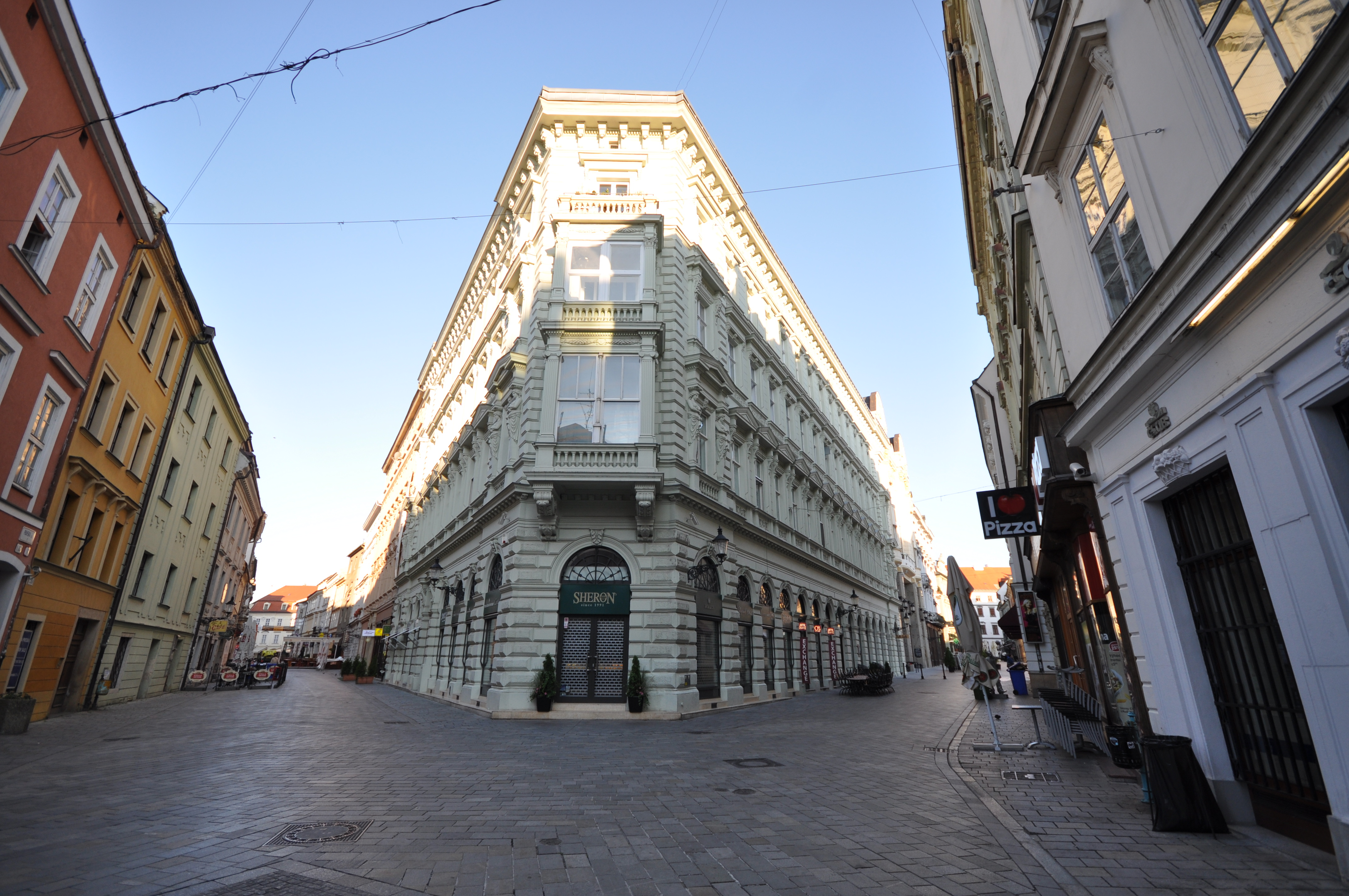
Streets of the Old Town

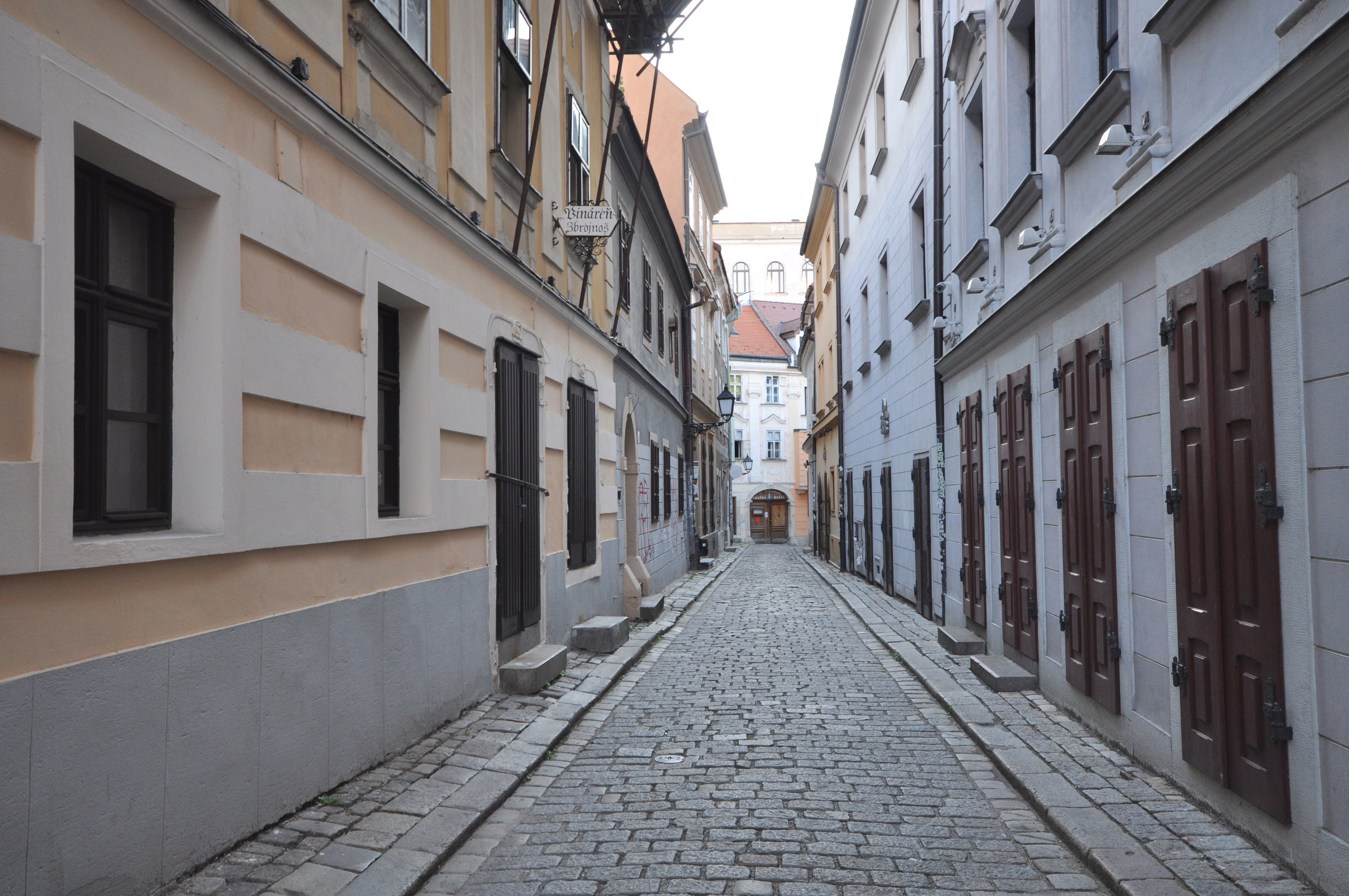
Bratislava Old Town

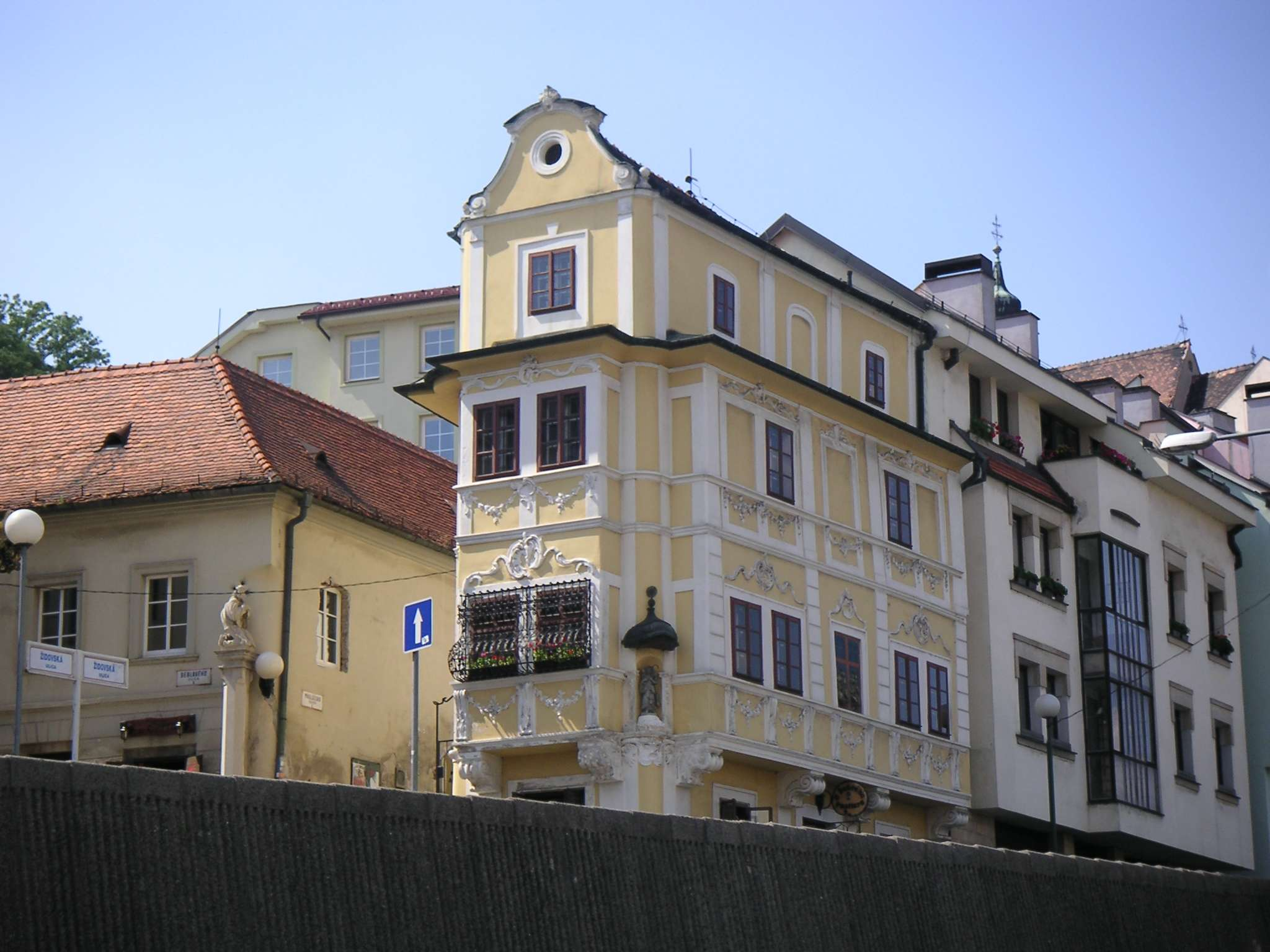
The Rococo-style "House of the Good Shepherd", home to the Museum of Clocks

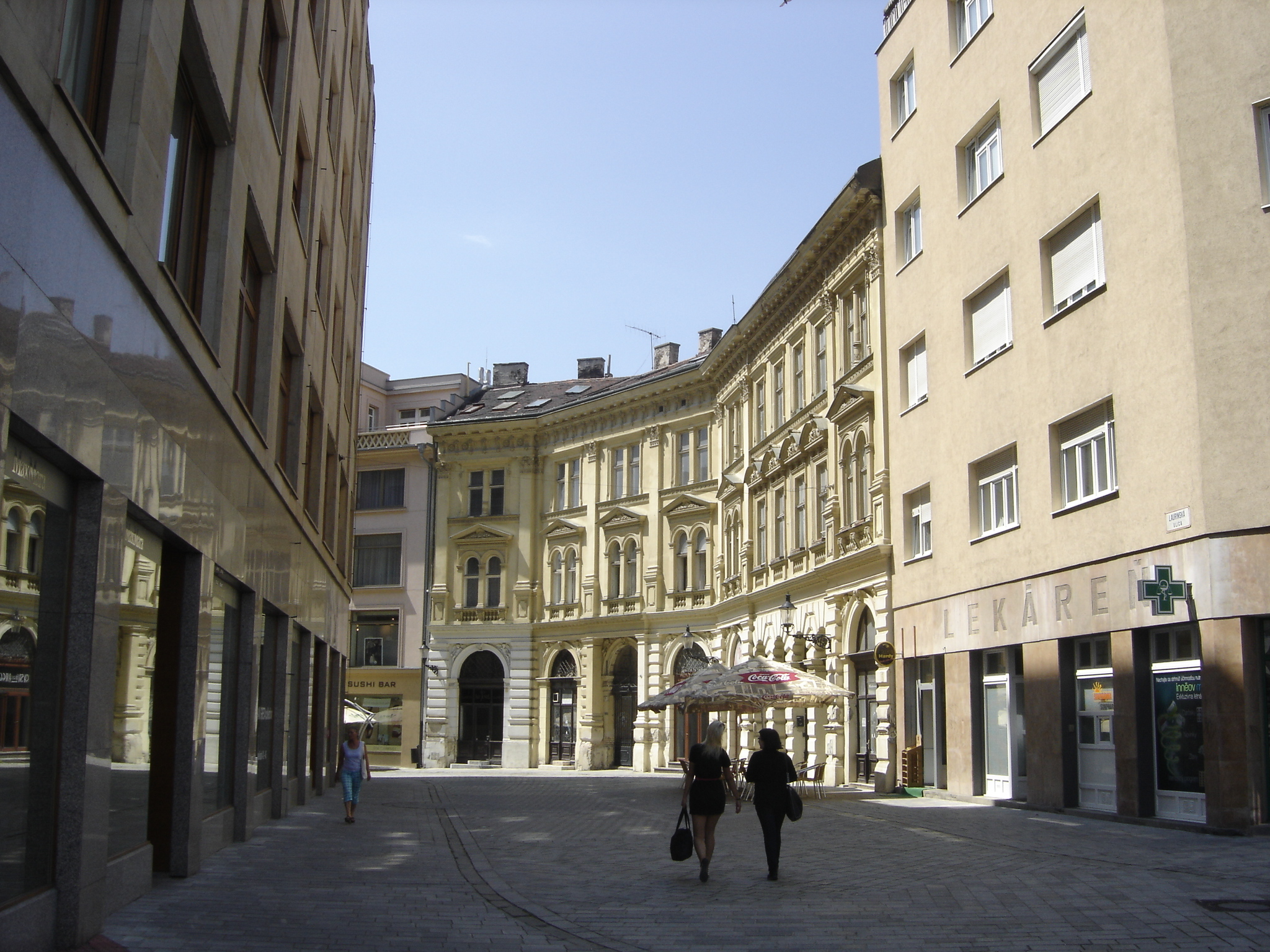
Laurinská Street

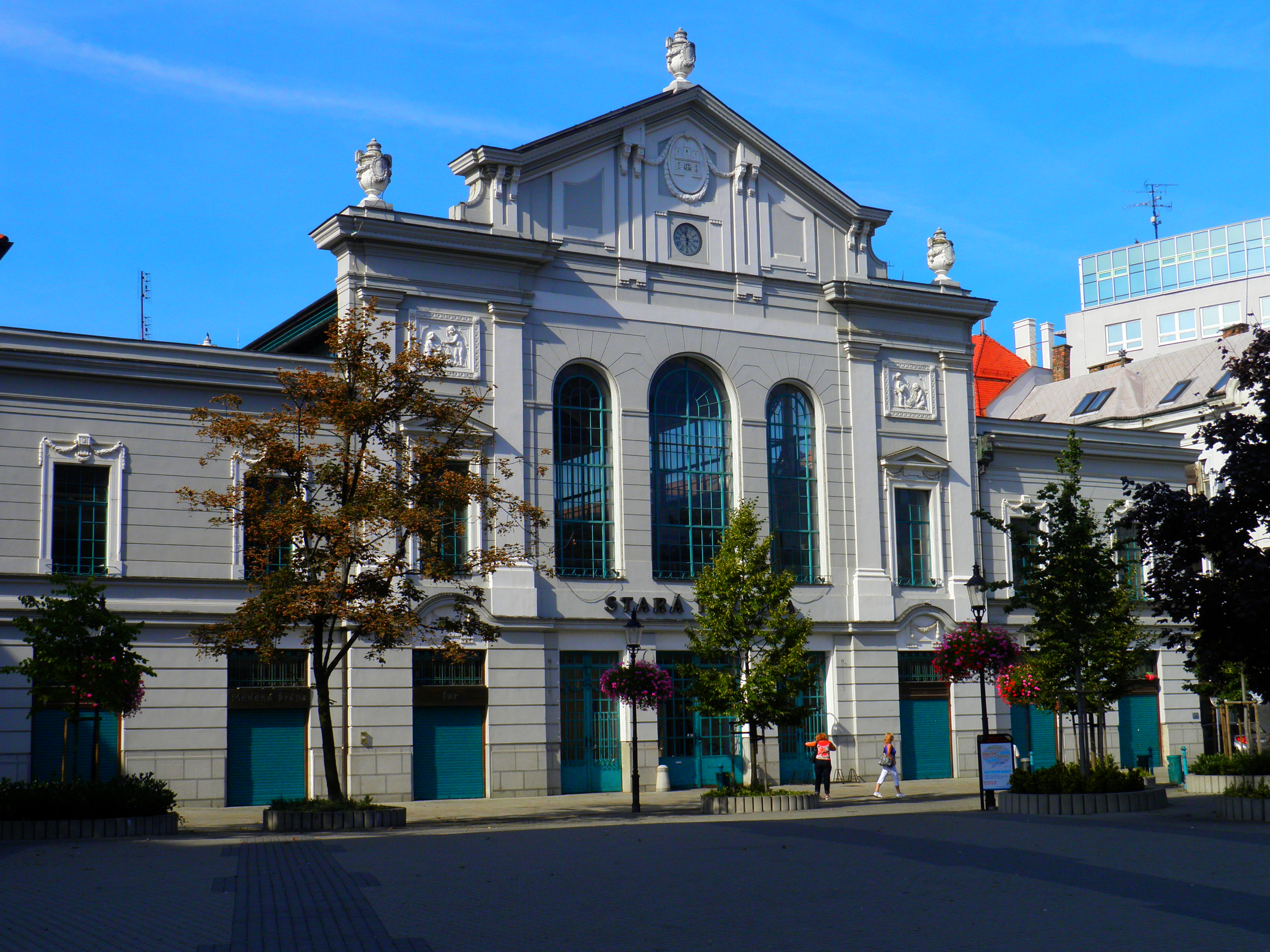
Stará Tržnica Market Hall, the oldest indoor market in Bratislava

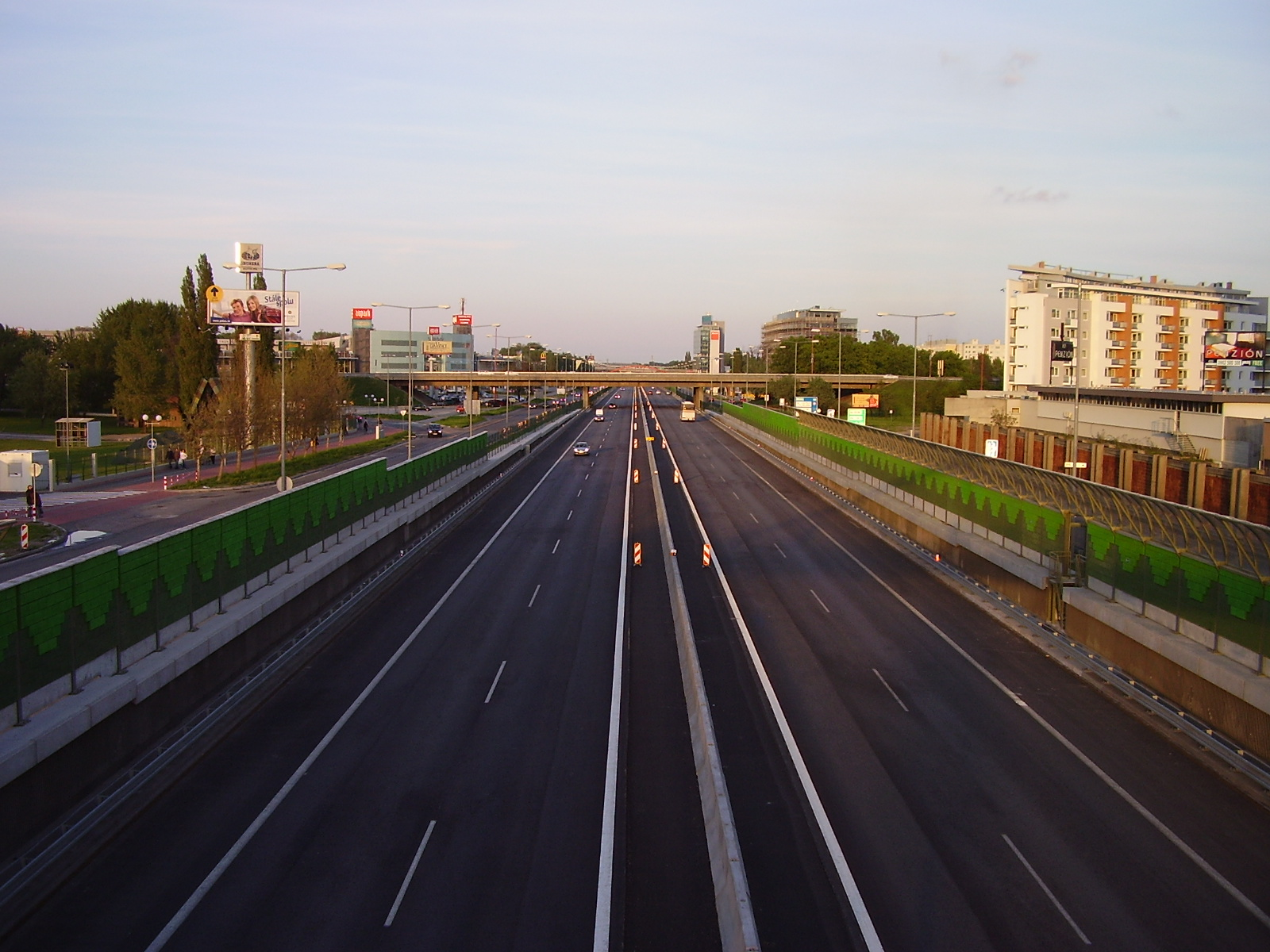
Einsteinova street

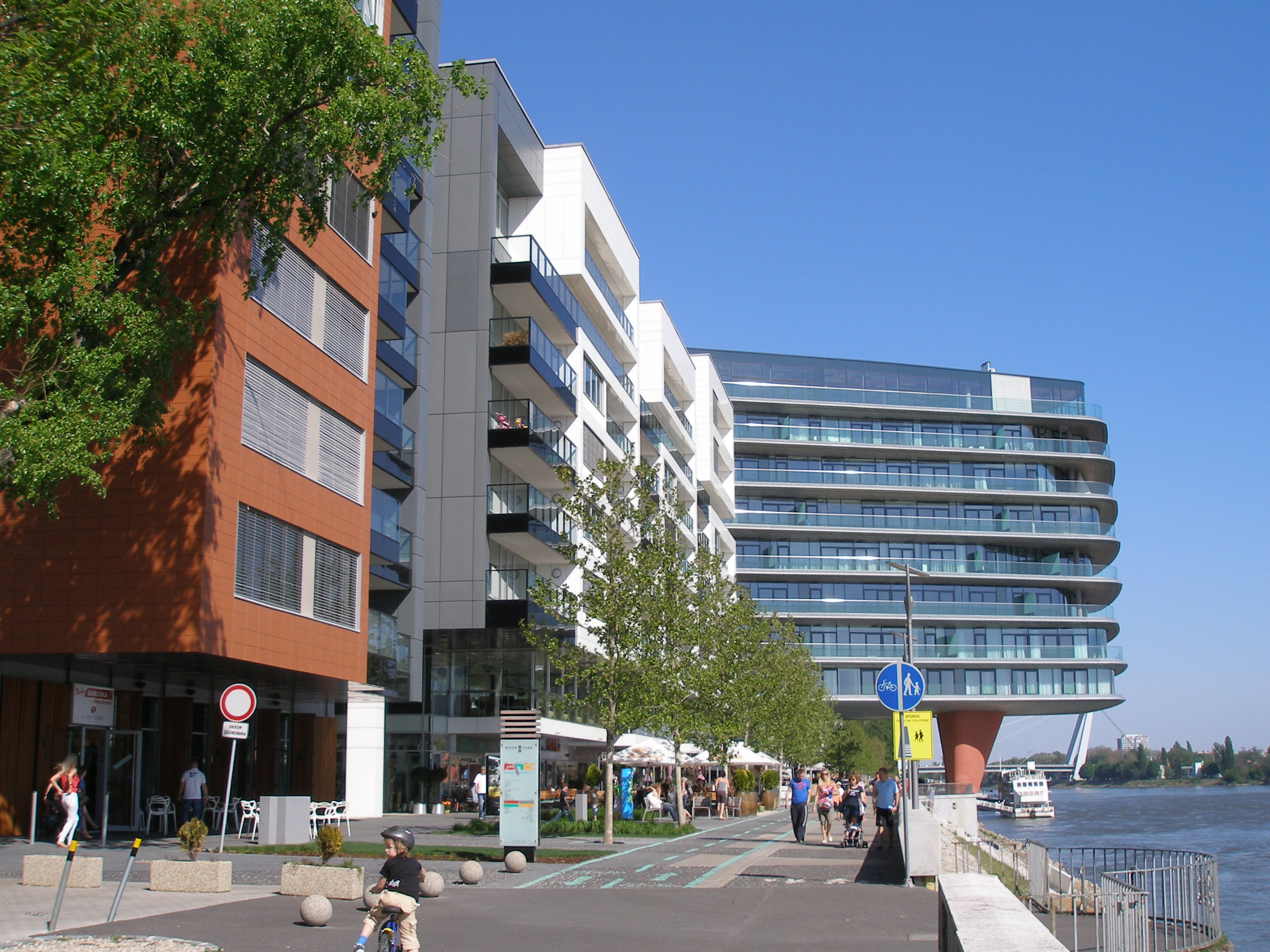
Embankment

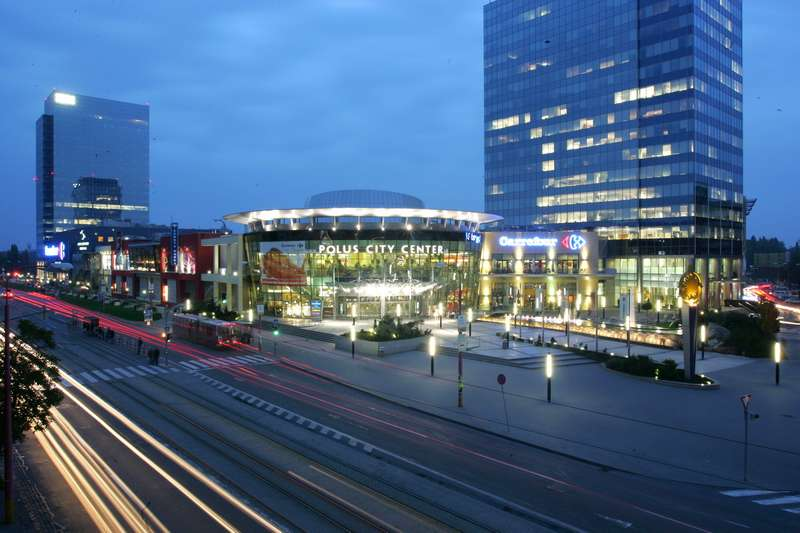
Polus Shopping Mall

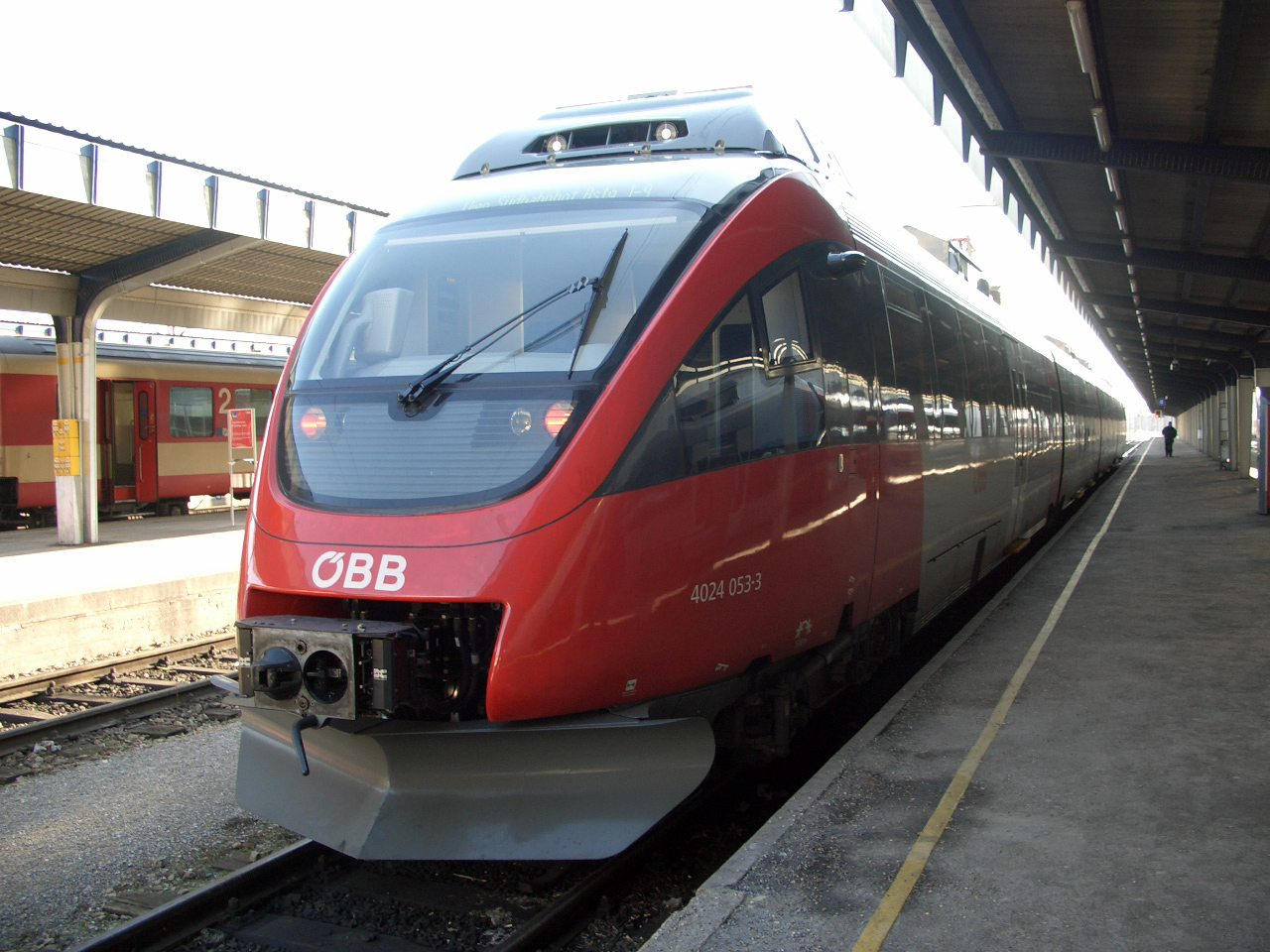
CityShuttle train connects Bratislava with Austria's capital Vienna.

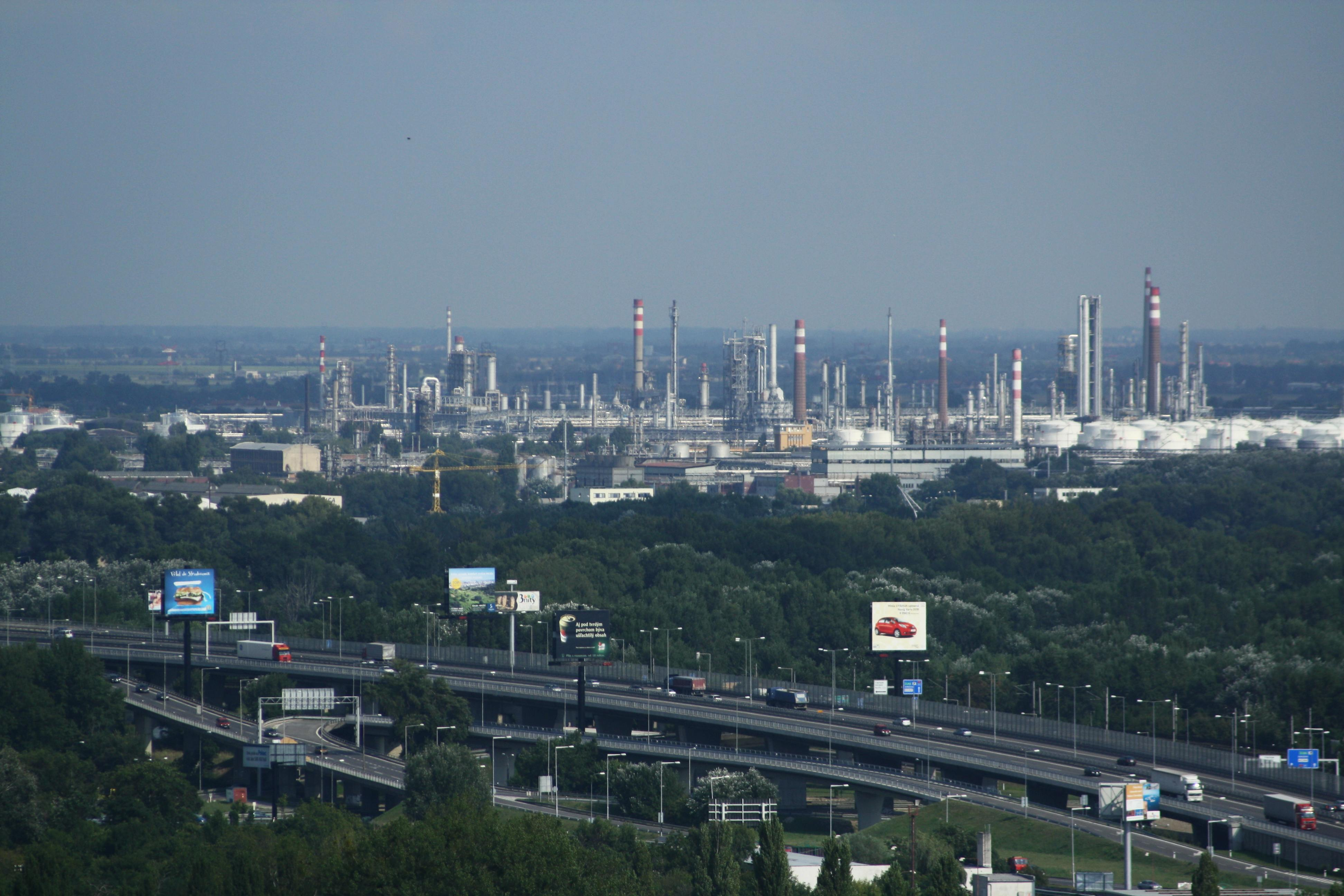
Refinery of Slovnaft in Bratislava

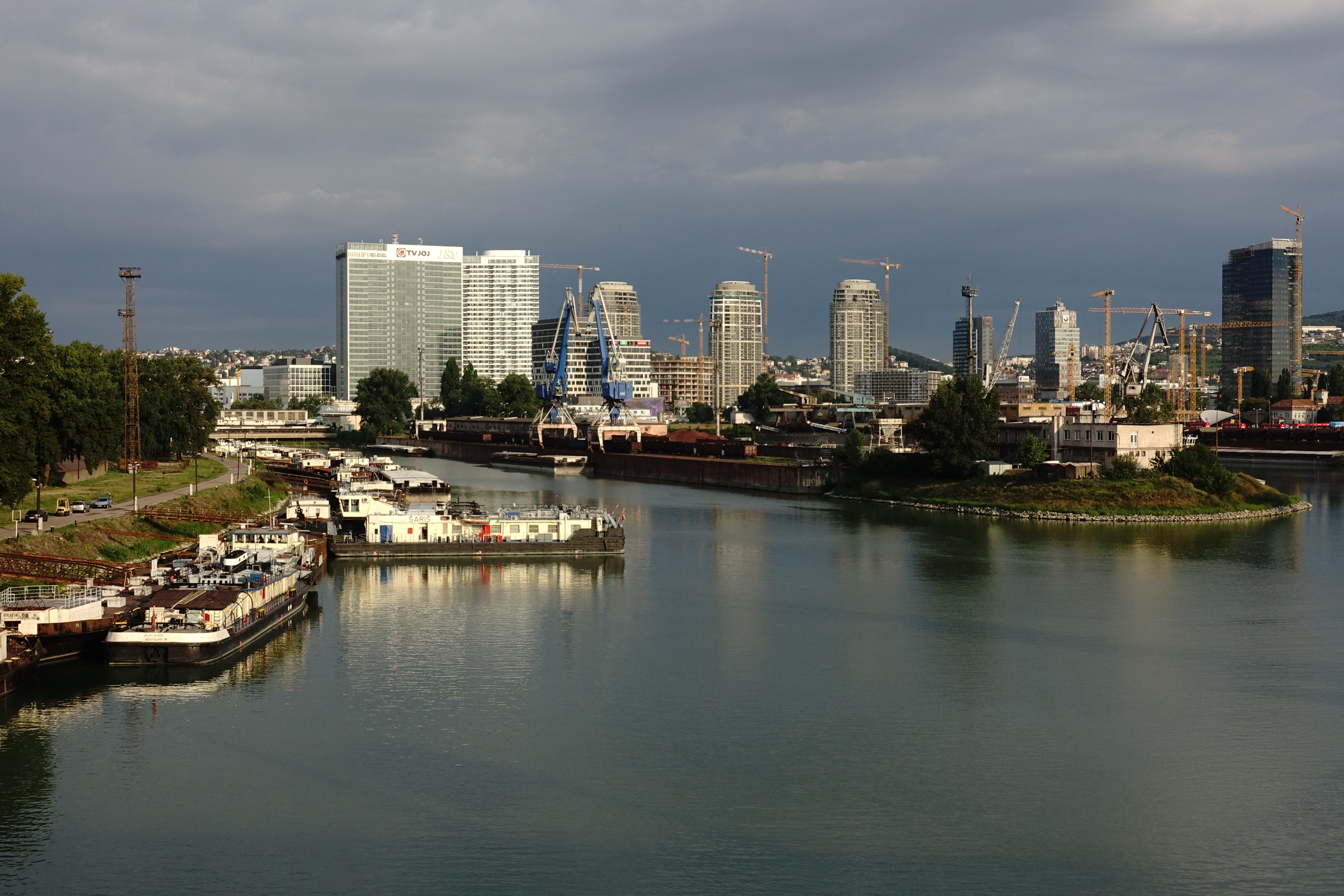
Port of Bratislava

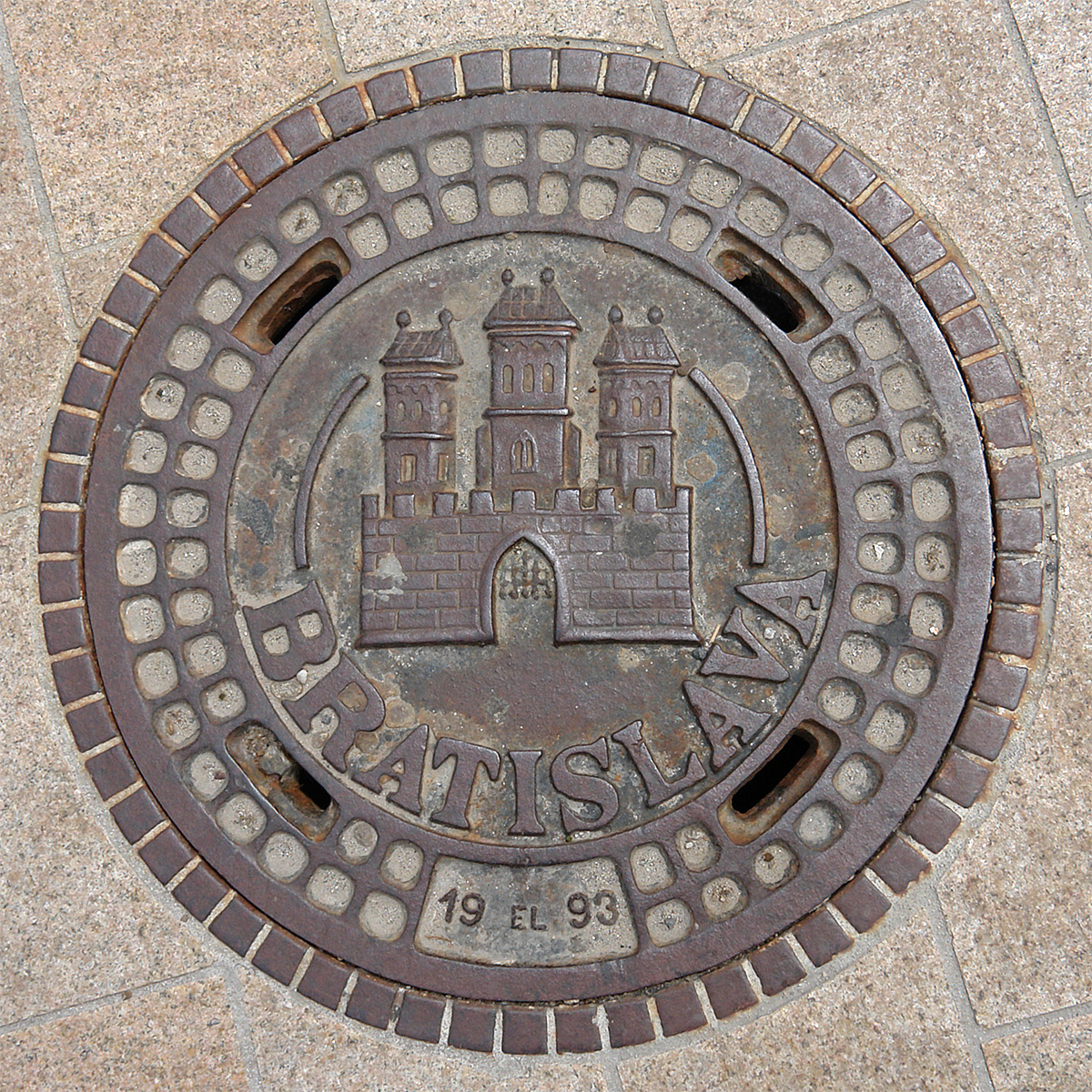
Manhole cover in Bratislava

== See also ==
- List of municipalities and towns in Slovakia
- List of streets in Bratislava
- List of fountains in Bratislava

== Sources ==
- Horváth, V.; Lehotská, D.; Pleva, J.; et al., eds. (1979). Dejiny Bratislavy [History of Bratislava] (in Slovak) (2nd ed.). Bratislava, Slovakia: Obzor.
- Janota, Igor (2006). Bratislavské rarity (Rarities of Bratislava) (in Slovak) (1st ed.). Bratislava, Slovakia: Vydavateľstvo PT. ISBN 80-89218-19-9.
- Kováč, Dušan (2006). Bratislava 1939–1945 – Mier a vojna v meste (Bratislava 1939–1945 – Peace and war in the town) (in Slovak) (1st ed.). Bratislava, Slovakia: Vydavateľstvo PT. ISBN 80-89218-29-6.
- Kováč, Dušan; et al. (1998). Kronika Slovenska 1 (Chronicle of Slovakia 1) (in Slovak) (1st ed.). Bratislava, Slovakia: Fortuna Print. ISBN 80-7153-174-X.
- Kováč, Dušan; et al. (1999). Kronika Slovenska 2 (Chronicle of Slovakia 2) (in Slovak) (1st ed.). Bratislava, Slovakia: Fortuna Print. ISBN 80-88980-08-9.
- Lacika, Ján (2000). Bratislava. Visiting Slovakia (1st ed.). Bratislava, Slovakia: DAJAMA. ISBN 80-88975-16-6.
- Špiesz, Anton (2001). Bratislava v stredoveku [Bratislava in the Middle Ages] (in Slovak) (1st ed.). Bratislava, Slovakia: Perfekt. ISBN 80-8046-145-7.
- Varga, Erzsébet (1995). Pozsony (in Hungarian) (1st ed.). Pozsony: Madách-Posonium. ISBN 80-7089-245-5.
- Jankovics, Marcell (2000). Húsz esztendő Pozsonyban (Twenty years in Bratislava) (in Hungarian) (2nd ed.). Pozsony: Méry Ratio. ISBN 80-88837-34-0.

=== Genealogical resources ===
The records for genealogical research are available at the state archive "Statny Archiv in Bratislava, Slovakia"

- Roman Catholic church records (births/marriages/deaths): 1601–1897 (parish A)
- Lutheran church records (births/marriages/deaths): 1606–1919 (parish A)
