= Bratislava City Council =

Legislative body of the City of Bratislava

Bratislava City Council Mestské zastupiteľstvo hlavného mesta Bratislavy

Leadership
- Mayor: Matúš Vallo, TB since October 2022
- First Deputy Mayor: Tatiana Kratochvílová, TB
- Deputy Mayor: Lenka Antalová Plavuchová, TB
- Deputy Mayor: Jakub Mrva, TB

Structure
- Seats: 45
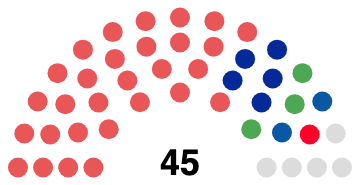
- Political groups: Majority (29): TB/PS/SaS (29); Minority (16): SOM (5); Independents (5); STANK (3); TM (2); ZĽ (1)

Elections
- Last election: October 2022

Meeting place
- Primate's Palace

Website
- bratislava.sk

The Bratislava City Council (Slovak: Mestské zastupiteľstvo hlavného mesta SR Bratislavy) is the legislative body of Bratislava, the capital city of the Slovak Republic. The Act on the Capital City of the Slovak Republic Bratislava requires that the council consist of 45 members, elected every four years in municipal elections. The most recent elections were held in 2022.

The council is responsible for approving the city budget, adopting binding regulations, electing deputy mayors, overseeing city management, and forming advisory commissions in various policy areas. It supervises the performance of the mayor and the city executive, manages municipal property, and approves strategic city documents and development plans. Sessions of the council are convened regularly, typically once a month, and are held publicly in the Primate's Palace.

== Composition and elections ==
The City Council consists of 45 members, as stipulated in the Act on the Capital City of the Bratislava. Councillors are elected for four-year terms during municipal elections. The council is made up of representatives of political parties, civic associations, and independents elected proportionally across the city's boroughs, each of which is allocated a number of seats based on population size.

== Responsibilities ==
Bratislava is a unique self-governing entity with a special legal status distinct from both Slovak municipalities and regions, but the responsibilities of the City Council resemble those of both municipal councils and regional parliaments. The council is responsible for approving the city’s annual budget and all major financial decisions, including investment plans, subsidies, and loans. It adopts generally binding ordinances that are valid across the entire city, covering areas such as transport regulation, environmental policy, waste management, and urban development.

It elects the city’s deputy mayors based on the mayor’s proposals, oversees the functioning of the Bratislava City Hall, and supervises the activities of the mayor and the executive council. The City Council also establishes expert commissions in various policy areas—such as education, social affairs, housing, and public transport—which advise on and help prepare legislation. It decides on the disposal or acquisition of municipal property, sets the city's long-term development strategies, and has the power to approve or reject city partnerships and international cooperation agreements. Additionally, it may award honorary citizenships and other symbolic recognitions.

== Council meetings ==
The City Council meets in the historic Primate's Palace, located in the Old Town district. Regular sessions are convened by the mayor, who also chairs the proceedings. Meetings are typically held monthly but can also be convened on an ad hoc basis if urgent matters arise.

All council meetings are open to the public and broadcast live through the city’s official website. During meetings, councillors have the right to propose motions, debate programs and legislation, submit interpellations, and question city officials.
