= Marek Hattas =

Slovak politician

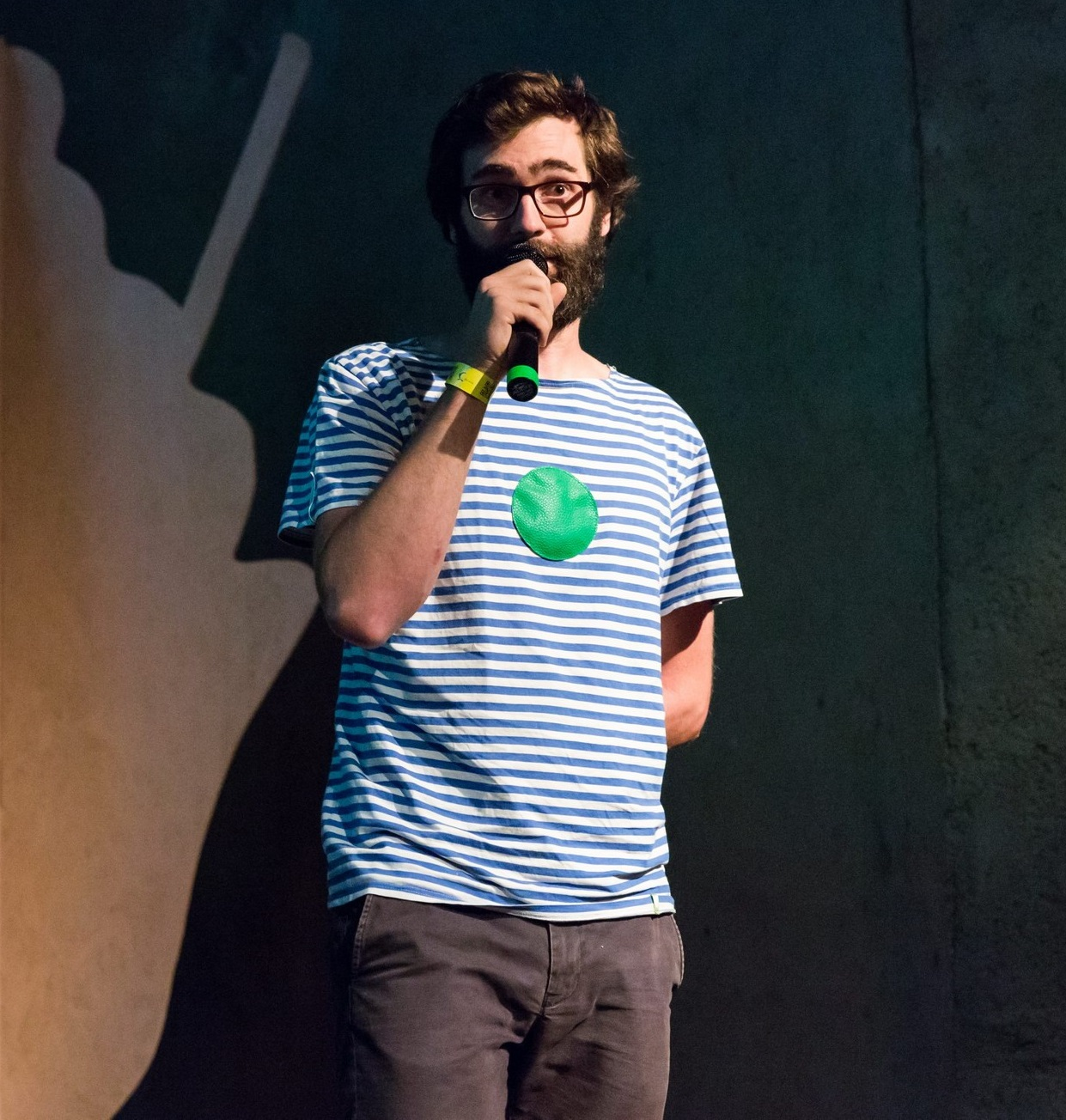

Mayor of Nitra
- Incumbent
- Assumed office 2018
- Preceded by: Jozef Dvonč

Member of the National Council
- In office 20 March 2020 – 25 October 2023

Personal details
- Born: 1 March 1987 (age 39) Nitra, Czechoslovakia
- Party: For the People (2019-2021); Team Nitra Region (2022-)
- Spouse: Monika Hattasová
- Children: 2

Marek Hattas (born 1 March 1987) is a Slovak politician and activist. Hattas has served as the mayor of Nitra since 2018 and a Member of the National Council since 2020.

== Early life ==
Hattas grew up in the Klokočina borough of Nitra. He studied Computer Science at the Masaryk University but did not graduate. Following his studies, he started a community center Hidepark in Nitra. He was also active in cycling activism, having founded the Rozbicyklujme Nitru! movement and in organizing anti-government protests following the murder of the journalist Ján Kuciak.

== Political career ==
In 2018 Slovak local elections Hattas was elected the mayor of Nitra, having defeated the long-serving incumbent Jozef Dvonč. The following year he joined the For the People party.

In the 2020 Slovak parliamentary election, he was elected to the parliament on the For the People list.

In 2021 Hattas left For the People and started his own regional party Team Nitra Region. In the 2022 Slovak local elections, he was again elected the mayor of Nitra.

== Personal life ==
Hattas is married to a veterinary Monika Hattasová. They have two children.
