= 2018 Slovak local elections =

The 2018 Slovak local elections were held on Saturday, 10 November 2018, to elect deputies to municipality councils, city councils and mayors, including mayors of boroughs and members of their councils in Bratislava and Košice.

The turnout slightly increased compared to last elections in 2014 to 48.67%. The highest turnout rate was recorded in Prešov Region (53.18%), and the lowest turnout rate in Bratislava Region (43.74%). Locally the highest percentage of votes cast was in Chorváty, Košice-okolie District (89.88%, 80 out of 89), and the lowest in Košice's borough Luník IX (19.44%, 862 out of 4,434).

In 762 cities and municipalities, only one candidate ran for mayor, therefore, these candidates needed only one vote to be elected. These included two cities with more than 20,000 inhabitants, Brezno and Šaľa. In five municipalities, there was no candidate for mayor.

== Electoral system ==
The commune elections in Slovakia use the one-round system for all elected seats. Mayoral elections utilize the first-past-the-post voting system compared to local councils where voters choose from the list same number of candidates as are representing theirs electoral district. The candidates with the highest number of votes are elected.

== Overall results ==
The following tables summarize the elected mayors and council deputies by their party affiliation.

=== Mayor elections ===
Summary of the 10 November 2018 mayor election results in Slovakia
Parties and coalitions	2014 Results		2018 Results	
Parties and coalitions	%	Total number	%	Total number
Independent candidates (NEKA)	37.95	1,104	42.42	1,232
Direction – Social Democracy (SMER-SD)	29.11	847	20.38	592
Coalitions of government parties (SMER-SD, SNS, MOST-HÍD)	—	— (Note: Single party government of SMER-SD)	8.03	234
Other parties and coalitions	18.35	552	7.19	222
Slovak National Party (SNS)	1.40	41	5.50	160
Christian Democratic Movement (KDH)	4.19	122	5.40	157
Most–Híd	2.99	87	4.37	127
Party of the Hungarian Community (SMK-MKP)	3.67	107	3.96	115
Coalition of Most–Híd and Party of the Hungarian Community (SMK-MKP)	1.03	30	1.06	31
Coalitions of opposition parties (SaS, OĽaNO, NOVA and Sme rodina)	0.63	19 (Note: Coalitions of opposition parties (KDH, OĽaNO, Most–Híd, SDKÚ-DS and SaS))	0.59	18
TOGETHER – Civic Democracy (SPOLU)	—	— (Note: Did not exist.)	0.55	16
Total		2,909		2,904

=== Council deputies ===
Summary of the 10 November 2018 council deputies election results in Slovakia
Parties and coalitions	2014 Results		2018 Results	
Parties and coalitions	%	Total number	%	Total number
Independent candidates (NEKA)	37.95	6,000	35.36	7,301
Direction – Social Democracy (SMER-SD)	24.68	5,123	17.88	3,692
Other parties and coalitions	20.14	4,179	11.42	2,359
Christian Democratic Movement (KDH)	10.55	2,190	11.38	2,350
Slovak National Party (SNS)	4.05	841	8.12	1,678
Party of the Hungarian Community (SMK-MKP)	5.54	1,151	6.04	1,248
Most–Híd	3.99	829	4.43	915
Coalitions of government parties (SMER-SD, SNS, MOST-HÍD)	—	— (Note: Single party government of SMER-SD)	2.18	453
TOGETHER – Civic Democracy (SPOLU)	—	— (Note: Did not exist.)	1.38	285
Coalitions of opposition parties (SaS, OĽaNO, NOVA, Sme rodina)	0.45	104 (Note: Coalitions of opposition parties (KDH, OĽaNO, Most–Híd, SDKÚ-DS and SaS))	1.00	214
National coalition	1.61	336 (Note: As Party of Democratic Slovakia (SDS))	0.73	151
Total		20,753		20,646

== Results in major cities ==
=== Bratislava ===
The incumbent mayor Ivo Nesrovnal elected as independent candidate decided to run for second term. However, he was defeated by architect and civil activist Matúš Vallo, supported by Progressive Slovakia and Together - Civic Democracy who became new mayor and defeated another independent candidate and former director-general of Radio and Television of Slovakia, Václav Mika.

Out of 17 new elected mayors of boroughs were 10 independent candidates and 7 candidates with the support of different centre-right coalitions - each with Freedom and Solidarity, We Are Family and New Majority.

Summary of the 10 November 2018 elections in Bratislava
Mayor			City Council		
Candidate	Votes	%	Diagram	Parties and coalitions	Seats
Matúš Vallo (Team Vallo, PS-SPOLU)	58,578	36.54		Independent candidates (NEKA)	17
Václav Mika (NEKA)	36,661	22.87		Centre-right coalition (Note: OĽaNO, SaS, Sme rodina, KDH, OKS, NOVA, Zmena zdola, DÚS)	15
Ivo Nesrovnal (NEKA)	29,531	18.42		Coalition of PS-SPOLU	13
Ján Mrva (OĽaNO, SaS, Sme rodina, KDH and others)	27,689	17.27			
Iveta Plšeková (NEKA)	2,445	1.53			
Roman Ruhig (SNJ-sv)	2,010	1.25			
Others	3,390	2.11			
Total	160,304				45
Valid votes	160,304	98.01			
Invalid votes	3,264	1.99			
Votes cast / turnout	163,558	40.68			
Registered voters	402,062				

=== Košice ===
The previous mayor, 2014-elected Richard Raši (SMER-SD), resigned from office after his appointment to new government as Deputy Prime Minister. Responsibility for the mayor office was taken over by Martin Petruško (SMER-SD). The campaign was influenced by rumored child harassment scandal of opposition candidate, Jaroslav Polaček that caused his loss of support from few major political parties. These rumors were later demented and Polaček won the election.

Out of 22 new elected mayors of boroughs were 13 independent candidates, 7 candidates with the support of different centre-right coalitions - each with Freedom and Solidarity and Christian Democratic Movement, 1 candidate of Direction – Social Democracy and 1 from Party of the Romani Coalition.

Summary of the 10 November 2018 elections in Košice
Mayor			City Council		
Candidate	Votes	%	Diagram	Parties and coalitions	Seats
Jaroslav Polaček (SaS, KDH, SMK-MKP, NOVA, OKS)	29,157	43.29		Independent candidates (NEKA)	18
Martin Petruško (SMER-SD, SNS)	16,044	23.82		Centre-right coalition led by SaS (Note: SaS, KDH, SMK-MKP, NOVA, OKS)	12
Alena Bašistová (NEKA)	10,001	14.85		Direction – Social Democracy	4
Viliam Novotný (Šanca)	6,084	9.03		Centre-right coalition led by OĽaNO (Note: OĽaNO, Sme rodina, Zmena zdola, DÚS, DS)	4
Vladimír Vágási (Most-Híd)	1,325	1.97		Sport for Košice and the East (ŠKV)	1
Džemal Kodrazi (NEKA)	1,061	1.58		TOGETHER – Civic Democracy	1
Štefán Horváth (Národná koalícia)	733	1.09		Party of the Romani Coalition	1
Others	2,943	4.37			
Total	67,348				41
Valid votes	67,348	95.30			
Invalid votes	3,319	4.70			
Votes cast / turnout	70,667	35.72			
Registered voters	197,859				

=== Prešov ===
Andrea Turčanová - the incumbent mayor elected with support of center-right coalition confirmed in February 2018 intention to candidate for re-election. Her biggest rival was the former mayor (2006-2014) and independent candidate Pavel Hagyari.

Summary of the 10 November 2018 elections in Prešov
Mayor			City Council		
Candidate	Votes	%	Diagram	Parties and coalitions	Seats
Andrea Turčanová (KDH, OĽaNO, NOVA)	14,205	45.73		Coalition of KDH, OĽaNO, NOVA	12
Pavel Hagyari (NEKA)	8,921	28.72		Independent candidates (NEKA)	8
Richard Drutarovský (PS-SPOLU, OKS)	2,648	8.53		Coalition of SMER-SD, SNS, Most-Híd	8
Miroslav Benko (SMER-SD, SNS, Most-Híd)	2,560	8.24		Coalition of PS, SPOLU and OKS	2
František Oľha (SaS, Sme rodina, Šanca, DS)	2,360	7.60		Centre-right coalition (Note: SaS, Sme rodina, Šanca, DS)	1
Others	366	1.18			
Total	31,060				31
Valid votes	31,060	99.14			
Invalid votes	270	0.86			
Votes cast / turnout	31,330	42.20			
Registered voters	72,251				

=== Žilina ===
Mayor of Žilina - Igor Choma (SMER-SD) announced he was not going to run for re-election. On the other hand, in Žilina occurred increased number of independent candidates elected to council. Election was won by Peter Fiabáne (NEKA) who was externally supported by both liberal and conservative center-right parties.

Summary of the 10 November 2018 elections in Žilina
Mayor			City Council		
Candidate	Votes	%	Diagram	Parties and coalitions	Seats
Peter Fiabáne (NEKA)	13,876	48.06		Independent candidates (NEKA)	25
Patrik Groma (NEKA)	7,142	24.74		Coalition of OĽaNO, SaS, OKS, NOVA	3
Martin Kapitulík (NEKA)	3,754	13.00		Direction – Social Democracy	1
Ľudmila Chudelková (NEKA)	2,548	8.83		Christian Democratic Movement	1
Ján Púček (ĽSNS)	917	3.18		TOGETHER - Civic Democracy	1
Others	635	2.20			
Total	28,872				31
Valid votes	28,872	98.78			
Invalid votes	357	1.22			
Votes cast / turnout	29,229	41.30			
Registered voters	70,771				

=== Banská Bystrica ===
Summary of the 10 November 2018 elections in Banská Bystrica
Mayor			City Council		
Candidate	Votes	%	Diagram	Parties and coalitions	Seats
Ján Nosko (NEKA)	18,281	75.19		Independent candidates (NEKA)	20
Igor Kašpar (OĽaNO, SaS, Sme rodina, KDH, PS)	5,490	22.58		Coalition of SMER-SD and SNS	8
Jozef Sásik (SĽSAH)	401	1.65		Centre-right coalition (Note: OĽaNO, SaS, Sme rodina, KDH, PS)	3
Peter Peuker (NAJ)	140	0.57			
Total	24,312				31
Valid votes	24,312	97.88			
Invalid votes	527	2.12			
Votes cast / turnout	24,839	39.75			
Registered voters	65,485				
