= Námestie Nežnej revolúcie =

Square in Bratislava, Slovakia

- Square
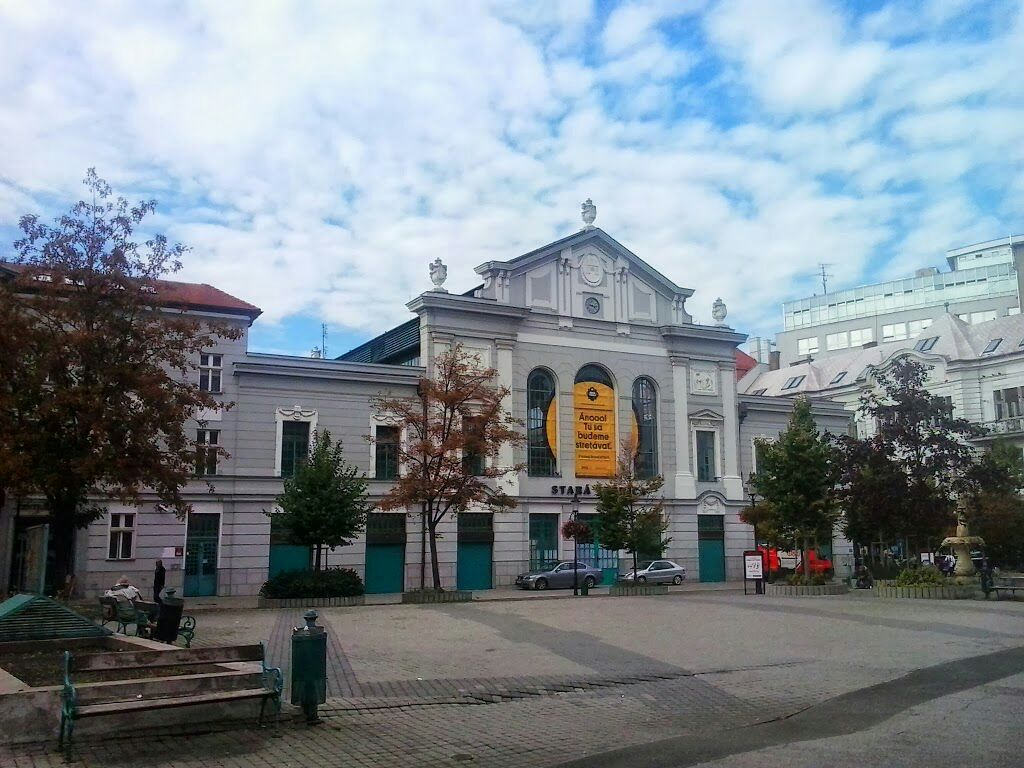
- Námestie Nežnej revolúcie with the Old Market Hall building

- Location in Slovakia
- Coordinates: 48°08′41″N 17°06′42″E
- Country: Slovakia
- Region: Bratislava
- City: Bratislava
- Borough: Old Town

Námestie Nežnej revolúcie (transl. Velvet Revolution square) is a square in the Old Town borough of Bratislava adjacent to the SNP Square in front of the Old Market Hall.

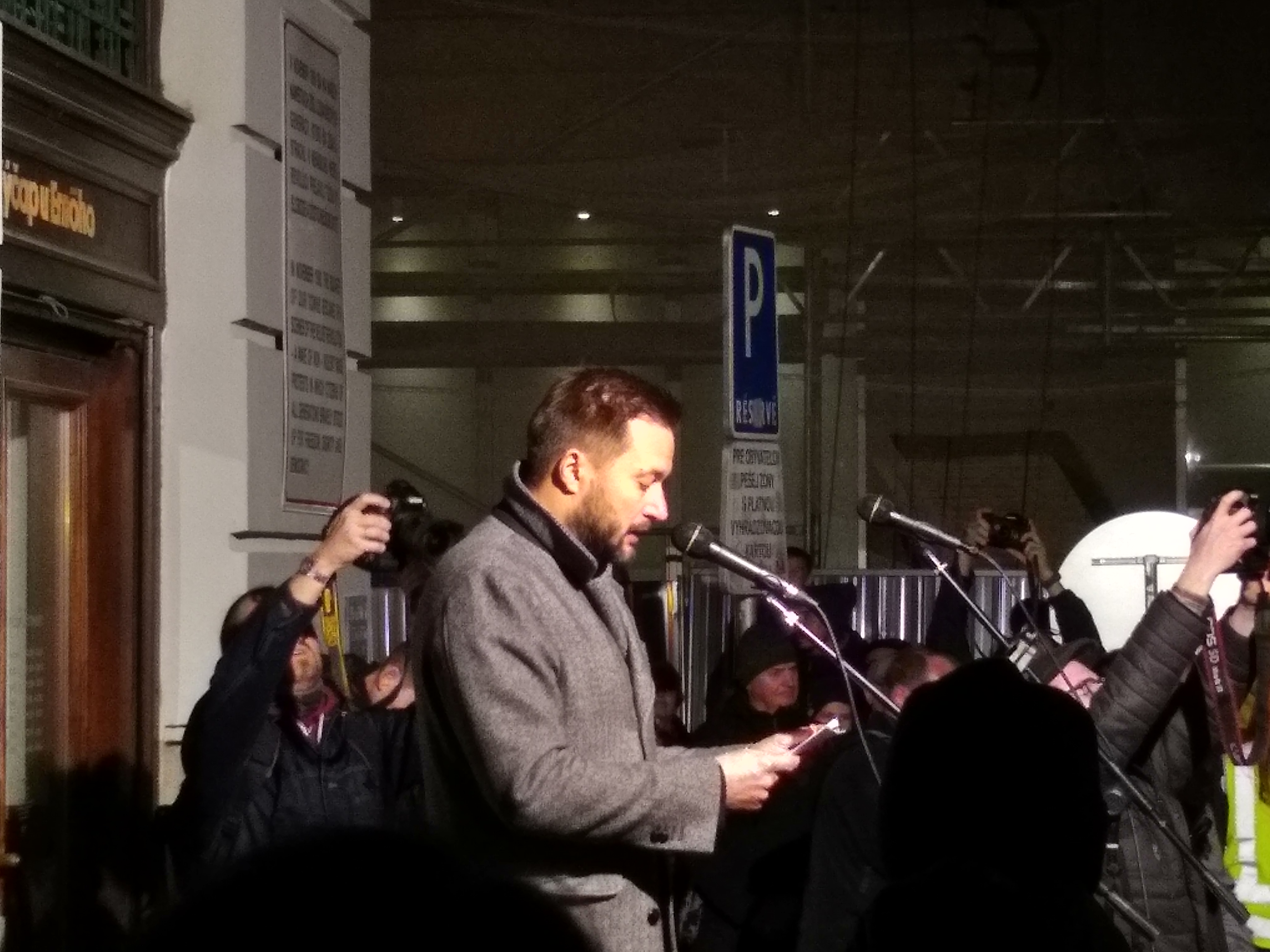
The Bratislava mayor Matúš Vallo introduces the square with a speech dedicated to the 30 anniversary of the Velvet Revolution on 16 November 2019

The square was given the name on 15 November 2019 to commemorate the 30 anniversary of the Velvet Revolution. The new name was introduced by the Mayor of Bratislava during a ceremony on 16 November 2019.
