= COVID-19 pandemic in Slovakia =

Aspect of viral disease pandemic

- Disease: COVID-19
- Pathogen: SARS-CoV-2
- Location: Slovakia
- First outbreak: Wuhan, Hubei, China
- Index case: Kostolište
- Arrival date: 6 March 2020 (6 years, 6 months, 3 weeks and 6 days ago)
- Confirmed cases: 1,889,970
- Recovered: 1,844,661
- Deaths: 21,401
- Fatality rate: 1.13%

Government website
- korona.gov.sk

The COVID-19 pandemic in Slovakia has resulted in 1,889,970 confirmed cases of COVID-19 and 21,401 deaths.

The virus was confirmed to have spread to Slovakia on 6 March 2020 when Prime Minister Peter Pellegrini announced that a 52-year-old man was infected. He had not travelled anywhere but his son had travelled to Venice in Italy, and was later confirmed as the first Slovak to be infected. Three cases were then confirmed, including the man's son and wife. During the next few days, COVID-19 cases went up to 21 out of 832 tested.

As of 4 February 2023, 7,219,030 COVID-19 vaccine doses have been administered in Slovakia.

== List of measures ==
Pellegrini adopted some of the strictest precautions in Europe at the time by banning all personal international flights, rail and bus travel, and unnecessary foreign travel; implementing border checks and a compulsory 14-day quarantine for everyone returning from abroad, and closing all schools nationwide. The following precautions were also taken:

- 28 February 2020 - Temperature screening of passengers for all passengers arriving in Slovakia by air
- 7 March 2020 - Deep sanitization of public transport vehicles in Bratislava
- 8 March 2020 - Secondary schools closed in Bratislava region
- 9 March 2020 - Primary schools closed in Bratislava, secondary schools in Trnava and Košice region
- 10 March 2020 - Events suspended
- 12 March 2020 - Emergency declared, all event venues closed
- 13 March 2020 - Compulsory 14-day quarantine upon returning from abroad, restarting border controls, international passenger transportation halted
- 15 March 2020 - Emergency declared in health care, face masks compulsory in public transport and shops
- 16 March 2020 - Non-essential stores closed
- 25 March 2020 - Compulsory face masks in public
- 6 April 2020 - Compulsory 14-day quarantine upon returning from abroad in a quarantine accommodation facility
- 8 to 14 April 2020 - Curfew during the Easter season
- 21 April 2020 - Tentative four-phase programme for lifting certain quarantine requirements announced
- 22 April 2020 - First stage of lifting quarantine measurements started. Allowed activities: shops under 300 square metres, long-term accommodation, outdoor non-contact sports, car selling (both new and second-hand), open air markets.
- 6 May 2020 - Second stage of lifting the quarantine combined with ahead of schedule third stage started. Allowed activities: short-term accommodation without restaurants or eating in common areas, pedicures and manicures, outdoor tourism, taxi services, services and weddings, massages, museums, galleries, libraries, exhibition halls.
- 20 May 2020 - Fourth stage of lifting the quarantine started. Concentration of people inside of stores increased from 1 person / 25 square metres to 1 person / 15 square metres. Theatres and cinemas opened, events with less than 100 participants allowed. Shopping malls reopened. Swimming pools and gyms open for members of sport clubs. Restaurant interiors now accessible. Face masks no longer mandatory when distance between people is at least 5 meters. Schools and Kindergartens to be opened later on 1 June 2020. Residents of Slovakia can now pass the borders and not go into state quarantine as long as they return in under 24 hours.
- As a reaction to rapidly rising numbers of infected cases during September, new restrictions were put in effect on 1 October. Face masks are again compulsory even in exterior spaces if separation of at least 2 meters between persons cannot be maintained. Mass events were restricted to less than 50 people. Restaurants and bars must close by 10 PM and shopping malls must maintain at least 10 meters squared and 2 meters separation per customer. Universities must switch to distanced learning.
- On 15 October, restrictions were tightened further. Mass events were banned, with the exception of baptisms, funerals and weddings, which must maintain at least 15 meters squared per person. Shops and shopping malls must also maintain at least 15 meters squared per customer and must check customer's body temperature. 9 to 11 AM is reserved for senior citizens. Sport events must be without spectators. Restaurants must serve customers only in exterior spaces or as take-out. Fitness centers, wellness centers, aquaparks, pools and saunas are closed. High schools must switch to distanced learning. Police may issue ticket up to €1,000 without warning.
- In October, a decision was taken to try to test every adult in the country. On 31 October and 1 November tests were undertaken in 5,000 test centres. 2.58 million people tested on Saturday with 25,850 test being positive. By Sunday evening the testing campaign concluded with more than 3.62 million people tested during the weekend. 38,359 (or 1.06%) were positive. Testing was not compulsory but anyone not isolating without a negative test result in a Curfew.
- On 19 December, a nationwide lockdown was instituted due to rising numbers of infected and deaths. Except for a few exceptions such as visiting family, going to/from work, buying basic essentials, visiting post offices, banks and doctors, people are required to stay home. The restrictions are planned to last until 10 January 2021.
- On 1 January 2021, measures were toughened again. Government closed ski centres and churches, prohibited hotels from taking new guests and visits between different households were prohibited. The restrictions will be in place until 24 January.
- Between 8 and 10 January, a decision was taken to try to test every adult in Nitra. Testing was not compulsory but anyone not isolating without a negative test result in a harsher Curfew in Nitra.
- In January, a decision was taken to try to test every adult in the country again. Testing was not compulsory but anyone not isolating without a negative test result in a harsher Curfew.
- 8 February 2021 - COVID Automat was launched.
- On 1 March 2021, measures were toughened again. Curfew was toughened between 8:00 PM and 1:00 AM. All shops were closed at 8:00 PM.
- 8 March 2021 - FFP2 face masks in public transport and shops.
- 15 March 2021 - Compulsory FFP2 face masks in interiors.
- 20 March 2021 - Holidays were prohibited until 28 April.
- 25 March 2021 - Movement in nature is only allowed between 5:00 AM and 8:00 PM.

== Background ==
On 12 January 2020, the World Health Organization (WHO) confirmed that a novel coronavirus was the cause of a respiratory illness in a cluster of people in Wuhan City, Hubei Province, China, which was reported to the WHO on 31 December 2019.

The case fatality ratio for COVID-19 has been much lower than SARS of 2003, but the transmission has been significantly greater, with a significant total death toll.

== Timeline ==
COVID-19 cases by districts in time

=== February 2020 ===
On 26–27 February, the annual Biogen conference took part in Boston attended by 175 executives, including from Slovakia. The conference was later identified as a super-spreading event with 300,000 additional cases of COVID-19 being attributed to it, notably in the United States, Australia, Slovakia and Sweden.

=== March 2020 ===
6 March

On 6 March, the first coronavirus case in Slovakia was confirmed. It was a 52-year-old man. It was a person-to-person spread, because the infected person had not been outside Slovakia lately, but his son had been in Venice, Italy. His son tested positive the next day, and had not shown any symptoms before.

Number of infected people on this day was 1.

7 March

On 7 March, the 52-year-old man's wife and son tested positive.

Number of infected people on this day was 3.

8 March

Ministry of Interior of Slovak Republic confirmed two more cases. The first infected person was a teacher in an infant school in Ružinov, Bratislava and the other one was a public transit bus driver from Bratislava.

9 March

The condition of the first infected man had gotten worse, and he was transported to an intensive care unit. Prime Minister Peter Pellegrini confirmed that there were 2 more cases of coronavirus in Slovakia. The first case was an employee of the U. S. Steel Košice company in Košice and the second case was his wife from Martin. In a press conference, the mayor of Bratislava Matúš Vallo announced that effective from Tuesday all educational institutions: (kindergartens, schools, universities) in Bratislava (city and Region) will be closed until Friday. Later on, a nationwide school quarantine was imposed for 2 weeks (until 27 March).

11 March

On this day, three more cases of the coronavirus were confirmed, taking the total number of infected to 10. Prime Minister Peter Pellegrini said that these people had been in contact with the infected Slovak family in Kittsee, Austria.

12 March

Six new cases of patients were confirmed by the prime minister at the country's crisis meeting which started at 11AM. All of the cases happened in Bratislava, as confirmed by the debriefing of the crisis meeting. Later that day, five more cases were confirmed positive, making the number of COVID-19 cases rise to 21, mostly spread around the western region of the country. Starting from 7AM (CET) border control was reinstated on the borders with Hungary, the Czech Republic and Austria. No traveller without a permanent residence or employment in Slovakia would be admitted. The train timetable during holidays for domestic trains became valid on weekdays as well. According to Prime Minister Peter Pellegrini, "Everything which is not vital will be closed for 14 days", in order to restrict the propagation of the virus. 20 health workers from the University Hospital in Ružinov were quarantined after unfair preferential admittance of a positively diagnosed patient arriving from Miami by the hospital director (case #11).

13 March

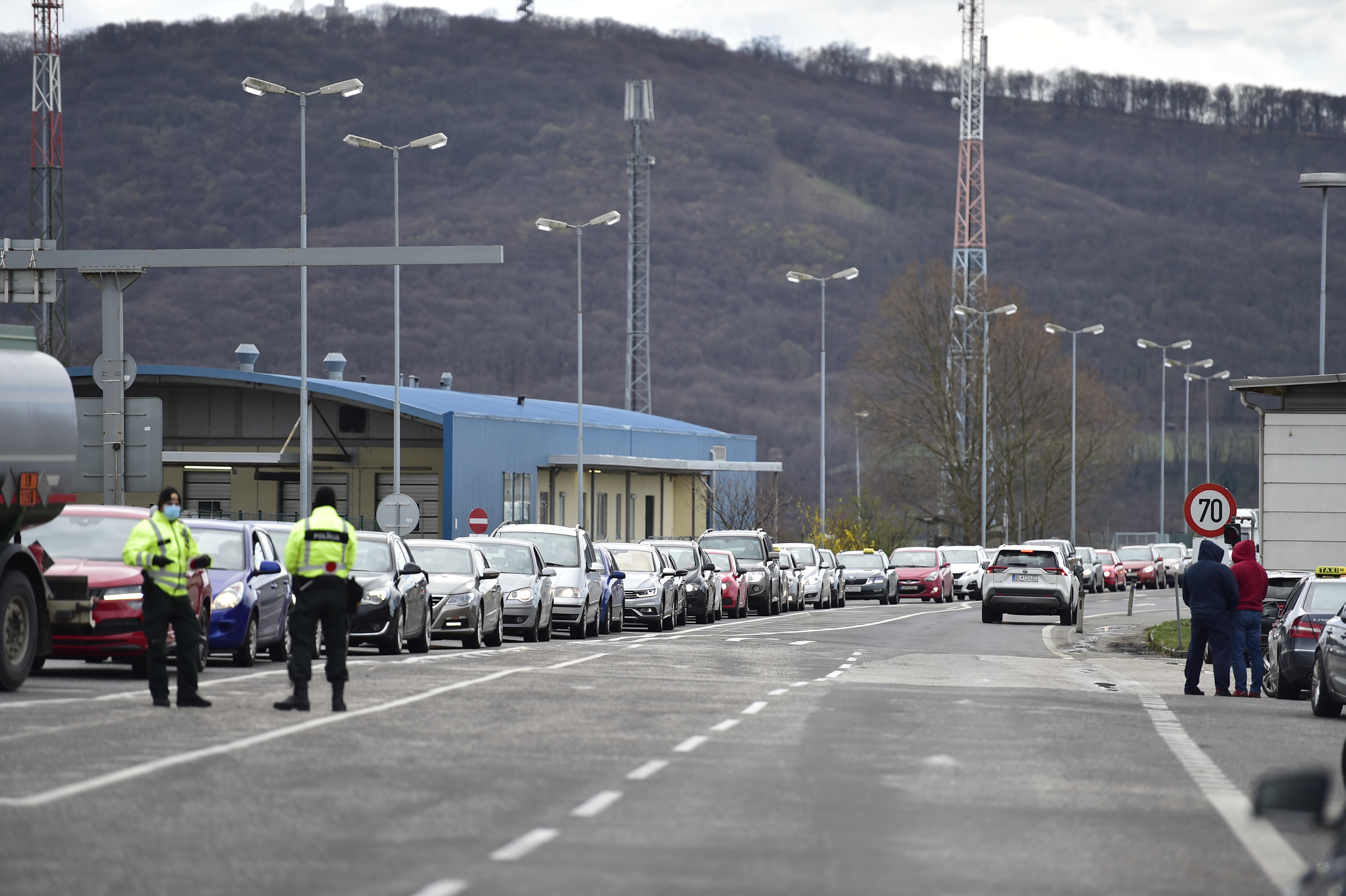
A queue of cars and trucks waiting to cross the Slovak border on 13 March

All three international airports (Bratislava, Košice, Poprad-Tatry) were closed from 7 AM for international passenger flights. 9 people tested positive. Later that day, another 2 people tested positive, taking the number of coronavirus cases to 32. The International Ice Hockey Federation cancelled the World U18 Championship Division I Group A in Spišská Nová Ves, (13-19 April).

14 March

Twelve people tested positive, making for 44 cases of coronavirus in total.

15 March

Ten people tested positive. Later that day, another 7 people tested positive, taking the number of coronavirus cases to 61. Slovakia officially declared a state of emergency.

16 March

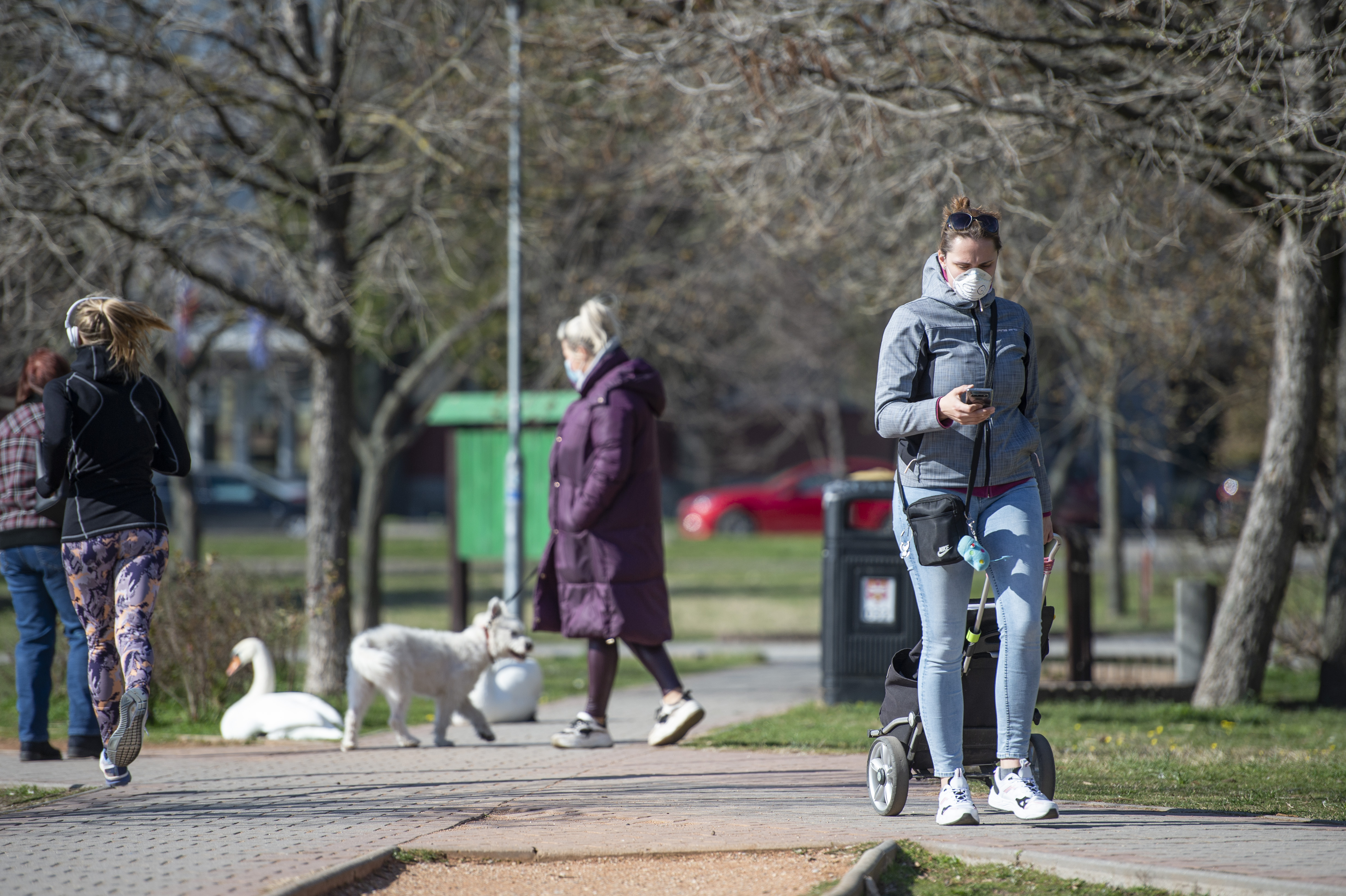
People in Bratislava wearing masks on 16 March

Two people tested positive. Later that day, another 9 people tested positive, taking the number of coronavirus cases to 72. 27 medical workers from the emergency department in Kramare hospital were quarantined, after a colleague of theirs - a surgeon tested positive upon returning from abroad.

17 March

Twenty-five people tested positive, taking the number of cases to 97 infected out of 1913 people tested. The Institute of the Health Policy expected the number of infected to reach 10% of the country's population. This would occur around 110 days from the start of the epidemic.

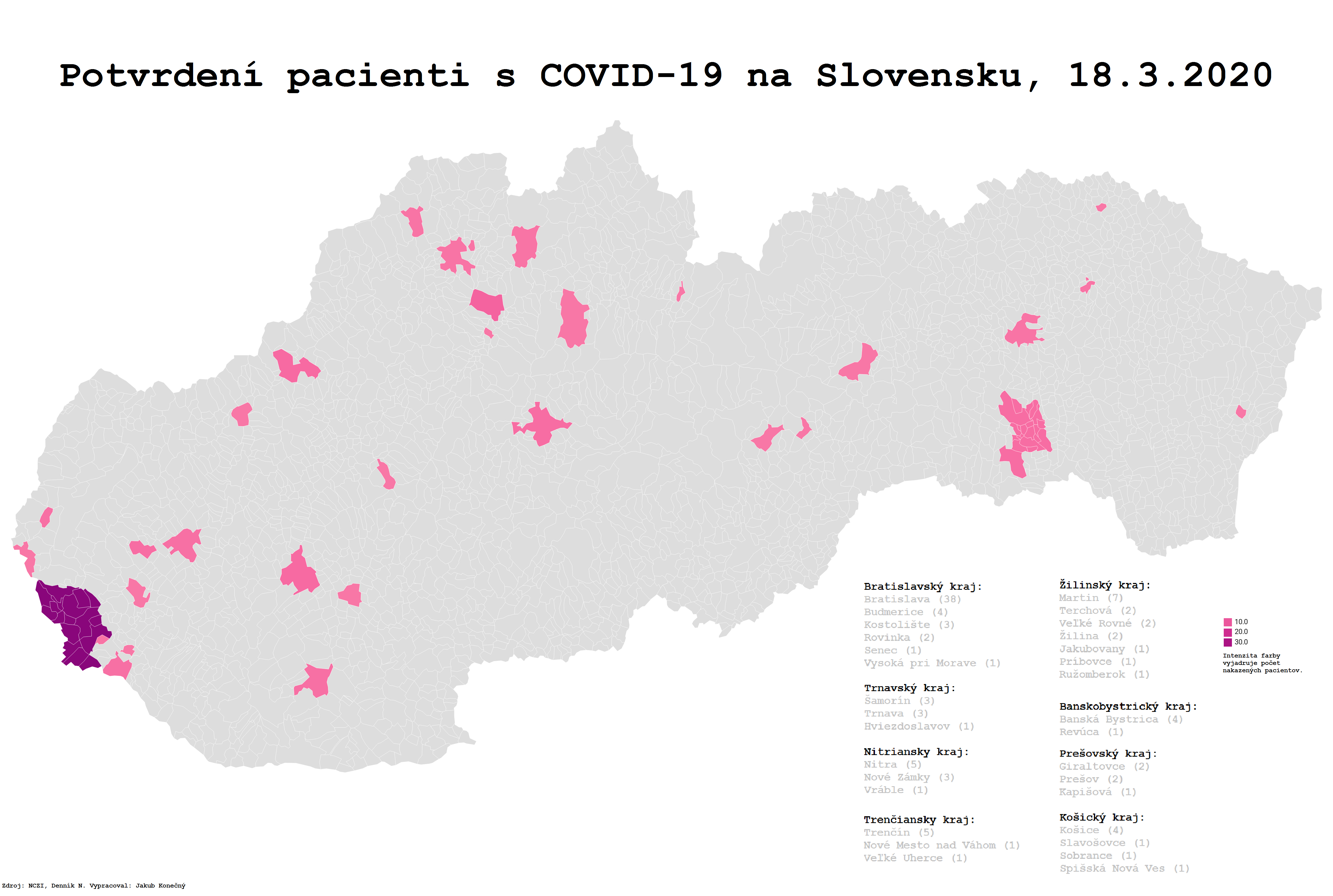
Distribution of 105 cases in the municipalities of Slovakia on 18 March 2020.

18 March

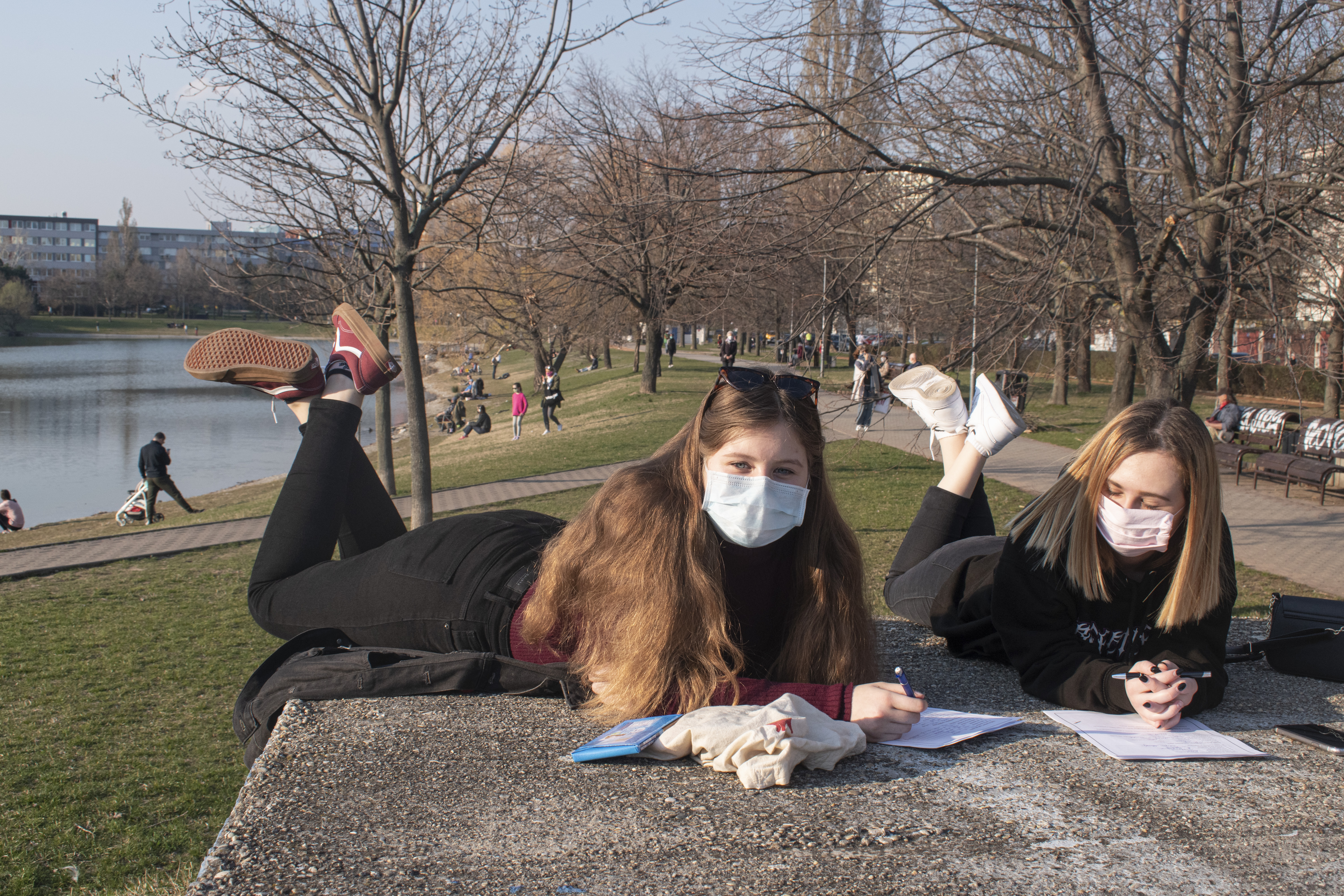
Slovakia was among the first countries in the world (and the second in Europe, after the Czech Republic) to make the wearing of masks mandatory in public.

Eight people tested positive, the number went over 100, and the total number of cases was 105. On this day prime minister Peter Pellegrini announced the first death: an 84-year-old woman. It remained unknown if she had died because of the Coronavirus, because she had several other major health problems. Later on, Pellegrini announced that with high probability, massive heart attack was cause of death. Of the 105 cases, only 35 (34%) were hospitalised. Twice as many: 70 (66%) were in home quarantine. Even though infection ward capacities were not enough as their bed numbers had been decreased. The second largest and also international train station in Bratislava - Petržalka stopped all passenger transport and also closed the underpass connecting Panónská and Kopčianska streets.

19 March

Nineteen new cases of the infection were recorded on this day. At least 5 of them were in home isolation (mainly cases diagnosed in Bratislava) the remaining 14 cases were hospitalised. Lowering the number of home treatment to 60% and increasing those hospitalised to 40%. As the autopsy of the woman who had died the day before decided that a stroke was the likely cause of death, she was dropped from the total number of patients, which climbed to 123, as opposed to 124, active cases in total.

20 March

Fourteen people tested positive, increasing the number of cases to 137. 3 of them, 2 males: one from Humenné, the other from Michalovce and a woman from Jakubovany were placed in the Quarantine Center in Gabčíkovo. In terms of hospitalisations: the total number grew to 60 (43%) of all cases. The remaining cases are under home isolation. In terms of spreading: 3 cases were identified upon return from Austria (all 3 quarantined at Gabčíkovo), one upon return from Paris and one had been in contact with a person from Austria. 7 patients who had contracted novel coronavirus have been released from hospital today.

All games in Slovakia's top football league: Fortuna Liga were to be postponed till May. Slovnaft donated 6 lung respirators to the University Hospital of Bratislava (UNB). The infectious hospital at Kramáre set up a tent for triaging and testing in front of its ordinary entrance. Late in the evening the first plane with 198 passengers on board brought Slovaks willing to return home from abroad. The plane came from the United Kingdom, all passengers were tested and underwent a mandatory quarantine in the center in Gabčíkovo.

21 March

Forty-one people tested positive, increasing the number of cases to 179. That was the highest increase since the beginning of the spread. 399 tests were conducted on that day, making the total 3257 which is far behind what should have been done, according to many experts. Also only 3000 tests remain, which should barely last for 10 days. The Kardiocentrum Nitra closed on this day and the staff were quarantined after the admission of a patient suspected of having Coronavirus. Also in Nitra, a second tent was raised at the hospital grounds to serve as a temporary infectious triage centre. Slovak mobile operators came forward with different offers and packages to help their clients, ranging from free calls to health service numbers, increased speeds and volume of data packages, as well as entertainment channels, mainly for kids. Slovaks returning home with the help of the government filled all three quarantine facilities (Gabčíkovo, Liptovský Ján, Donovaly) ran by the Ministry of Interior. A fourth one was opened in Vysoké Tatry under the jurisdiction of the Ministry of Defence. Banks announced they would allow clients to postpone payments of their monthly installments on loans.

22 March

Seven more people tested positive. 235 tests were negative. Total tests: 3499. 6 of the seven cases are hospitalized: 2 in each of the hospitals of Bratislava, Nitra and Martin. One person was in a quarantine in the Gabčíkovo Quarantine Center. The entire gynecological department of the University hospital in Ružinov, Bratislava was closed today, after it was discovered that a doctor has recently returned from abroad. Blood reserves and blood donations were decreasing. Buses with Slovaks from the UK arrived in a quarantine center in Bardejov.

23 March

The new Prime Minister, Igor Matovič, announced that he wants to test 3000 people every day.

24 March

The number of cases from the previous day starts to be updated in the morning of the next day.

26 March

First 2 people are officially recovered.

30 March

Twenty-two more people tested positive on the previous day. Total tests: 7441. Blood donations are decreasing rapidly. New Minister of Health Marek Krajčí asked all eligible people to donate blood, if possible. 60-year-old man has died just hours after being released from hospital where he was treated at pulmonary department and tested for COVID-19 with positive result. The cause of death was not yet confirmed to be due to COVID-19 as of 5 April.

=== November 2021 ===
Due to a surge in infections, Slovakia has imposed stricter restrictions for unvaccinated citizens effective 22 November. Only citizens that have been vaccinated or recovered from a COVID-19 infection in the last six months will be permitted to enter restaurants, shopping malls, shops with non-essential goods, sports activities and public events. Some services will face further restrictions even for those vaccinated, in regions that are more severely affected. Most regions will require unvaccinated citizens to be tested in the workplace. The restrictions will be in place for three weeks, but the Prime Minister Eduard Heger stated that more restrictions could be implemented if the situation does not improve. He called this policy a “lockdown for the unvaccinated”.

== Statistics ==
New cases per day
View source data.
Deaths per day
View source data.

== See also ==
- COVID-19 pandemic by country and territory
- COVID-19 pandemic in Europe
