= Ftáčnik =

Ftáčnik (feminine: Ftáčniková) is a Slovak surname. Notable people with the surname include:

- Ľubomír Ftáčnik (born 1957), Slovak chess grandmaster
- Milan Ftáčnik (1956–2021), Slovak politician
