= Jakubovany =

Jakubovany may refer to places in Slovakia:

- Jakubovany, Liptovský Mikuláš, a municipality and village in the Žilina Region
- Jakubovany, Sabinov, a municipality and village in the Prešov Region
