= Hosťovce, Košice-okolie District =

Municipality of Slovakia

Hosťovce Bódvavendégi
- Municipality
- Flag Coat of arms

- Location of Hosťovce in the Košice Region Location of Hosťovce in Slovakia
- Coordinates: 48.57°N 20.87°E
- Country: Slovakia
- Region: Košice Region
- District: Košice-okolie District
- First mentioned: 1360

Area
  - Total: 4.82 km^{2} (1.86 sq mi)
- Elevation: 171 m (561 ft)

Population (2025)
  - Total: 220
- Time zone: UTC+1 (CET)
  - Summer (DST): UTC+2 (CEST)
- Postal code: 440 4
- Area code: +421 55
- Vehicle registration plate (until 2022): KS
- Website: www.obechostovce.sk

Hosťovce (Hungarian: Bódvavendégi) is a village and municipality in the Greater Košice District in the Kosice Region of eastern Slovakia. The village has a Hungarian population.

== History ==
The village was first mentioned in historical records in 1360. From 1964 to 1990, together with the villages of Chorváty and Turnianska Nová Ves, Hosťovce was part of the village of Nová Bodva.

== Geography ==
The municipality lies at an altitude of 171 metres (561 ft) and covers an area of 4.82 km^{2} (1.86 sq mi) (2025).

== Population ==
Population statistic (10 years)
Year	1995	2005	2015	2025
Count	208	181	193	220
Difference		−12.98%	+6.62%	+13.98%

Population statistic
Year	2024	2025
Count	218	220
Difference		+0.91%

It has a population of 220 people (31 December 2025).

=== Ethnicity ===
Census 2021 (1+ %)
Ethnicity	Number	Fraction
Hungarian	142	70.29%
Slovak	90	44.55%
Not found out	3	1.48%
Total	202	

In year 2021 was 202 people by ethnicity 142 as Hungarian, 90 as Slovak, 3 as Not found out and 1 as Turkish.

Note on population: The difference values of population numbers in the table "Population statistic" and in the sections "Ethnicity" & "Religion" is caused by the use of various statistical methods.

=== Religion ===
Census 2021 (1+ %)
Religion	Number	Fraction
Roman Catholic Church	124	61.39%
Calvinist Church	49	24.26%
None	15	7.43%
Greek Catholic Church	5	2.48%
Not found out	4	1.98%
Evangelical Church	3	1.49%
Total	202	

In year 2021 was 202 people by religion 124 from Roman Catholic Church, 49 from Calvinist Church, 15 from None, 5 from Greek Catholic Church, 4 from Not found out, 3 from Evangelical Church, 1 from Christian Congregations in Slovakia and 1 from Other.

== Genealogical resources ==
The records for genealogical research are available at the state archive "Statny Archiv in Kosice, Slovakia"

- Greek Catholic church records (births/marriages/deaths): 1760-1945 (parish B)
- Reformated church records (births/marriages/deaths): 1789-1931 (parish A)

== See also ==
- List of municipalities and towns in Slovakia
