= Hummel Fest =

Music festival for the commemoration of Johann Nepomuk Hummel

- Genre: Classical music
- Dates: August–December
- Locations: Bratislava, Vienna, Weimar
- Years active: 2018
- Founders: Krisztina Gyöpös
- Website: hummelfestpressburg.com

Hummel Fest is an international music festival of pieces written by Johann Nepomuk Hummel which was founded as a commemoration of this composer on the occasion of his 240th birth anniversary on the initiative of pianist Krisztina Gyöpös It comprises concerts and other events, such as courses, masterclasses, ballet performances, selection of opera and exhibitions. Events of the festival take place on places associated with the life of Hummel: Bratislava, Vienna and Weimar.

The first year of the festival was organised in 2018, when eminent artists from Bratislava, Vienna, Weimar, Hamburg, Budapest, The Hague, Soul, and Zürich and students and teachers from different universities presented themselves to the audience. The festival began with an opening concert on 11 August 2018 in the Primate's Palace in Bratislava. The last event held in Bratislava took place on 6 November. One concert was also held in Vienna on 11 September. The first year of the festival was concluded by a series of concerts and events in Weimar from 6 to 9 December.
