= Episcopal Summer Palace, Bratislava =

Seat of the government of Slovakia

Coordinates: 48°09′09″N 17°06′34″E

Episcopal Summer Palace
- Letný arcibiskupský palác
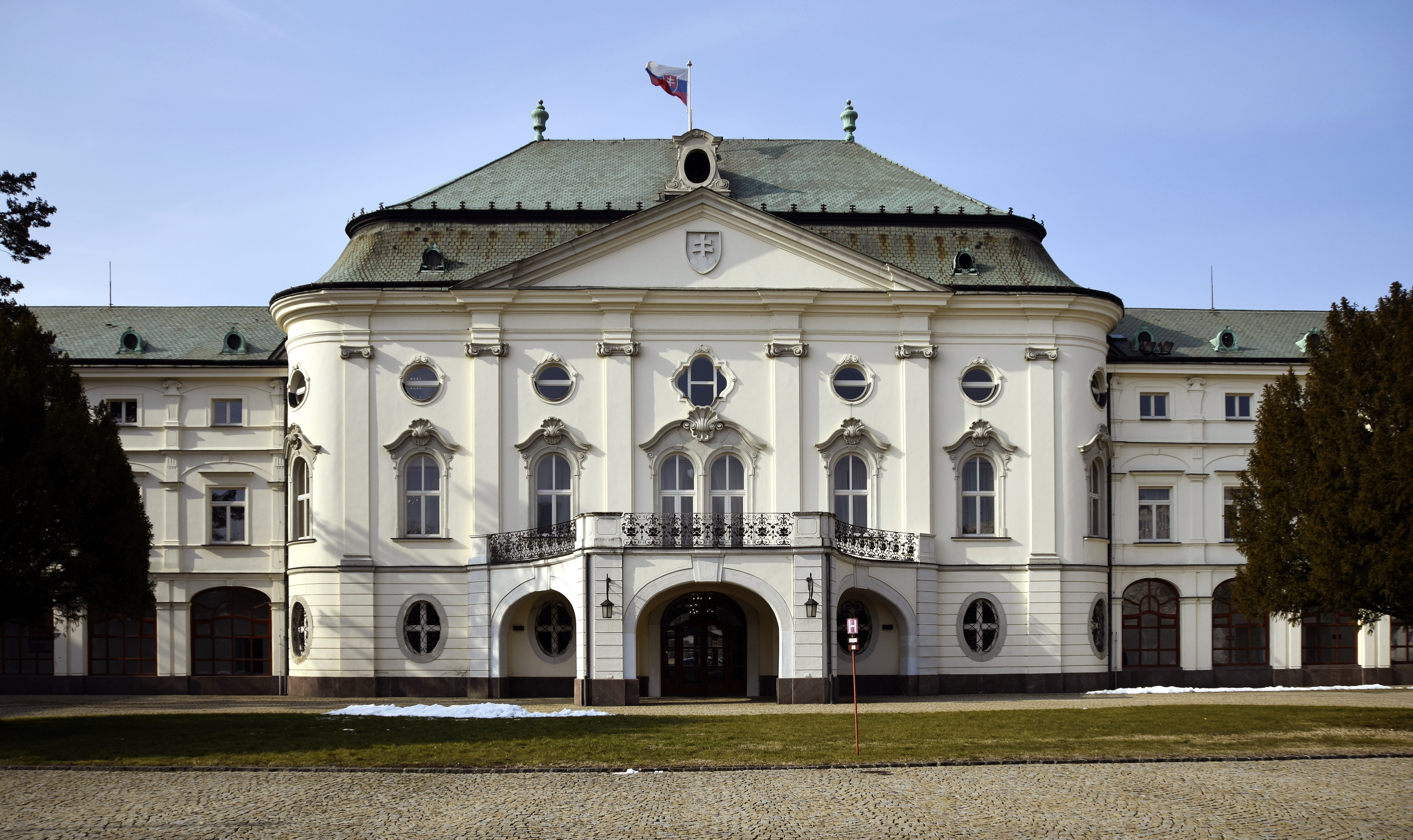
- Interactive map of the Episcopal Summer Palace area

General information
- Type: Palace
- Architectural style: Baroque
- Location: Bratislava, Slovakia, Námestie slobody 1, Bratislava
- Current tenants: Office of the government of the Slovak Republic
- Construction started: 1642-1666 first palace
- Completed: enlarged and reconstructed in 1761-1765
- Renovated: 1940-1941

Design and construction
- Architect: Franz Anton Hillebrandt

Renovating team
- Architect: Emil Belluš

The Episcopal Summer Palace (Slovak: Letný arcibiskupský palác, Hungarian: érseki nyári palota) is the former summer residence of the Archbishop of Esztergom. Their main residence in Pressburg (the old name of Bratislava) was the Primate's Palace (the current city hall). Pressburg was then the capital of the Kingdom of Hungary and the seat of the Archdiocese.

The palace was originally in the 17th century a Renaissance summer seat for the archbishops of Esztergom (since Esztergom had been occupied by the Ottoman Empire in 1543, the archbishops were based in Trnava and Pressburg). The baroque sculptor Georg Rafael Donner had a studio in the palace garden for almost 10 years. The palace now houses the government of Slovakia.

== History ==
When the Turks started invading Europe, Hungarian nobility started fleeing into the northern parts of Hungary (present-day Slovakia). After the Turks captured Buda in 1541, Pozsony (German: Pressburg or Preßburg) (since 1918 Bratislava) became the capital city of Hungary. After the city of Esztergom was captured, the seat of the Esztergom archbishop (highest ranking Hungarian church official at that time) had to be moved. At first, he lived in the building of his predecessors at the place of today's Primate's Palace in the city center. The old gothic residence, however, despite its many reconstructions failed to provide the comfort the archbishop was accustomed to. In spite of Hungary being decimated by the Turks, the nobility started to emulate the foreign custom of building summer palaces in the countryside.

The land for the Summer Archbishop's Palace, just behind the second ring of city defences, was at that time considered to be countryside. It was acquired at the beginning of the 17th century by archbishop Ferenc Forgách (who was archbishop from 1607 to 1615) and a garden was established there. The archbishop's summer residence was built probably in 1614.

Archbishop György Lippay (who was archbishop from 1642 to 1666) had the garden converted into a renaissance garden by filling it with exotic plants and trees, fountains that used water taken from the mountain springs, artificial caves and a big water pool where horses used to bathe. The garden's masterpiece was a garden pavillon with walls encased in mosaic and streams of water flowing through a musical instrument similar to an organ. Neither the garden or the pavillon survived this period of time. Lippay also had a new residence built sometime during his tenure as archbishop.

Archbishop Imre Esterházy (who was archbishop from 1725 to 1751) had the garden reconfigured in a baroque style. It was under archbishop Ferenc Barkóczy (who was archbishop from 1761 to 1776) that the current version of the palace was built. Between 1761 and 1765, Barkóczy had Austrian architect F. A. Hillebrandt convert the old Lippay building into a large baroque palace. Also, Rococo style decorations, a Rococo fence and a yard of honour were added.

In the 19th century, the seat of Esztergom archbishops was moved back to Esztergom and the Hungarian capital was moved to Buda. After the Napoleonic Wars a strong garrison of king-emperor's army remained in the city. Summer Archbishop's Palace was converted into a military hospital and its garden was used as a military exercising ground. Statues from the garden were sold and an outside staircase leading from the garden directly to a hall on the first floor was demolished. The hall was split into two rooms full of beds for wounded soldiers. The palace remained a military hospital until the 1930s. After the breakup of Czechoslovakia the newly created Slovak State was in need of administrative and office buildings in the capital city to house the government and ministries. Summer Archbishop's Palace was chosen to house the Ministry of foreign affairs and a whole government district was supposed to be constructed in the vicinity, this plan however did not materialise.

A project by Slovak architect Emil Belluš from 1940 to 1941 was implemented by removing all buildings from the garden and adding the two wings of the palace, creating the building we see today. Belluš probably secured the deal with his previous work on the nearby Grassalkovich Palace.

The palace building was reconstructed for the purposes of the Ministry of foreign affairs. It served as that ministry's seat in the 1940s. Also the interior of the Summer Archbishop's Palace was reconfigured somewhat during this reconstruction.

As of today, most of the statues were lost; the St. John statue now stands in the courtyard of the Primate's Palace, and the statues of atlants are in the town of Kittsee. In the palace interior only two original pieces remain - a fresco on the ceiling of the palace's 18th century chapel and an altar. Today, the restored palace with its English garden houses the government of Slovakia (see External links).

== Gardens ==
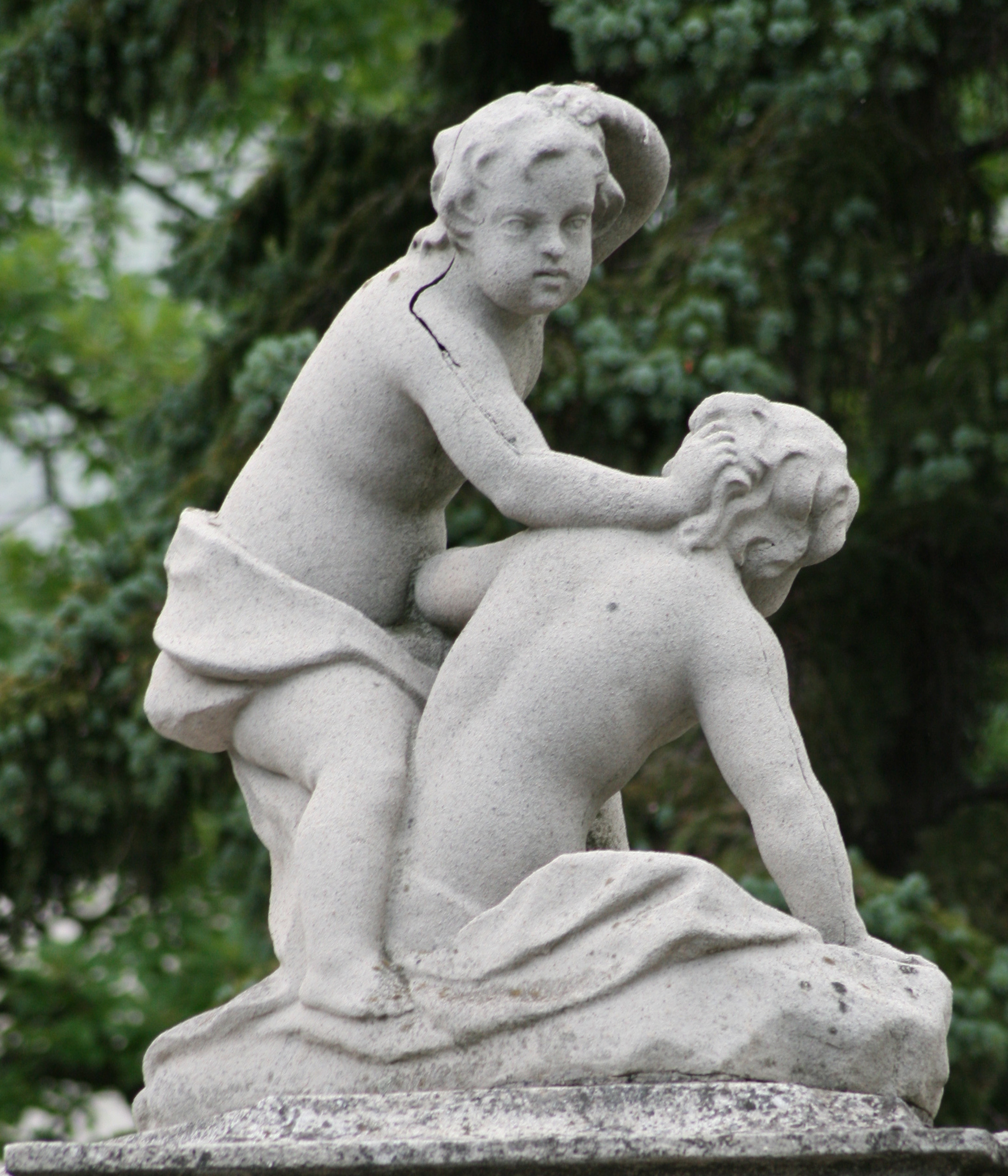
One of the sculptures on the palace's fence

Summer Archbishop's Palace and its garden are inaccessible to the public, except for a few hours during one day each year as part of a Doors Open Days program. Access on this day is guided, not everything is accessible and the place gets crowded. Slovak politicians and mainstream media frequent the place year-round, especially almost every Wednesday, when Slovak government usually convenes.

== Access ==
In 2009 the palace was open for 5 hours and the guided public tour included:

- Mirror hall (Zrkadlová sála)
- Yellow room (Žltý salónik)
- Green room (Zelený salónik)
- Pink room (Ružový salónik)
- Conference room of the Vice Prime minister of the Slovak Republic
- Chapel of the government office

== See also ==
- Primate's Palace, Bratislava
- Politics of Slovakia
- History of Bratislava
- Episcopal Palace, Vienna
