= Andrej Ďurkovský =

Slovak politician

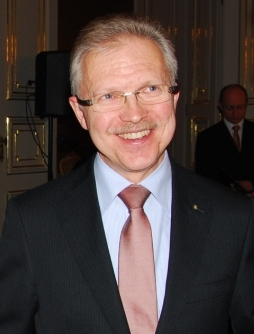

Member of the National Council of the Slovak Republic
- In office 8 July 2010 – March 2012

Mayor of Bratislava
- In office 7 December 2002 – 21 December 2010
- Preceded by: Jozef Moravčík
- Succeeded by: Milan Ftáčnik

Mayor of the Old Town (Borough of Bratislava)
- In office 1994–2002

Personal details
- Born: 5 September 1958 (age 68) Bratislava, Czechoslovakia
- Party: KDH
- Education: Slovak University of Technology in Bratislava
- Website: Official website

Andrej Ďurkovský (born 5 September 1958) is a Slovak politician and former member of the Christian Democratic Movement (KDH). After being elected the mayor of Bratislava twice – from 2002 to 2010 – he was elected into the National Council of the Slovak Republic (NR SR) in the 2010 Slovak parliamentary election. In the Slovak capital, he remains a controversial figure because of construction activities lowering the quality of life in the city, but many of his scandals resonated also on a nationwide level and culminated in Ďurkovský being forced to voluntarily leave his political party KDH in 2011.

== Early career ==
Ďurkovský attended the I. Horváth gymnasium in Ružinov and continued his studies at the Faculty of Civil Engineering at the Slovak University of Technology in 1982, both in Bratislava. In 1988 he took part in the Candle demonstration in Bratislava.

From 1983 to 1990 he was employed in Hydroconsult, š.p. Bratislava as the main project leader (pojektant). In 1990 he worked as a project manager in Project office Vasko in Wien.

== Political career ==
He entered politics after the Velvet Revolution and became a member of the Christian Democratic Movement (KDH) in 1990. In 1994, he became mayor of the Old Town in Bratislava and remained there until 2002, when he was elected as the mayor of Bratislava. He was reelected, having won municipal election in 2006, and served his second term until 2010. Afterwards, he decided to not run for the office the third time.

== Controversy ==
Despite making suspicious political decisions even as the mayor of the Old Town borough of Bratislava (for example the scandal with giving out city flats, where Ďurkovský sold a 4-room flat in the historical city center for 1813 € to the current head of his political party Ján Figeľ among others), it was in his position as the mayor of Bratislava where Ďurkovský generated most controversy.

Among his scandals are: (source: Trend 48, 2 December 2010)

- the unanswered question why the city sold land under and next to Park kultúry a oddychu for one third of the price of similar land where the Eurovea development now stands
- numerous parcels of lucrative land in the city sold without public competition
- purposefully kept the rules for the development of Bratislava unclear and vague
- numerous non-residential estates belonging to the city of Bratislava that ended up in the hands of local "tough boys" and mafia, converted into gambling parlors or pubs

In the 2010 Slovak municipal election, his latest scandal concerning the demolishing of Park kultúry a oddychu in Bratislava became one of the key points in that election that contributed to the shifting of political power from the right to left (Ďurkovský being a politician leaning towards right).

In January 2011, the police started investigation in the Bratislava water company (Slovak: Bratislavská vodárenská spoločnosť), which was one of the reasons for Ďurkovský's forced departure from his political party KDH, which he co-founded in 1990. Former Prime minister of Slovakia Robert Fico described Ďurkovský's activities in the company as "robbery of the century".

== Other activities and personal life ==
- Foundation Prameň - Member of the Board of Administrators
- Nadácia Bratislava - Director of the Board of Administrators
- Slovak University of Technology (STU), Faculty of construction - Honorary member of the Science Council
- Academy of Performing Arts in Bratislava (VŠMU) - Member of the Board of Administrators
- Bratislava High School of Law, Faculty of Masmedia - Member of the Science Council

Andrej Ďurkovský is married since 1986 with his wife Františka and has three children - sons Filip and Michal and daughter Mária. His wife is active in NGOs aimed at helping autistic people, since one of the Ďurkovský children has autism. Ďurkovský speaks fluently English and German. He enjoys bicycling, sport diving and photography.
