= Episcopal Palace, Vienna =

Coordinates: 48.2092°N 16.3731°E

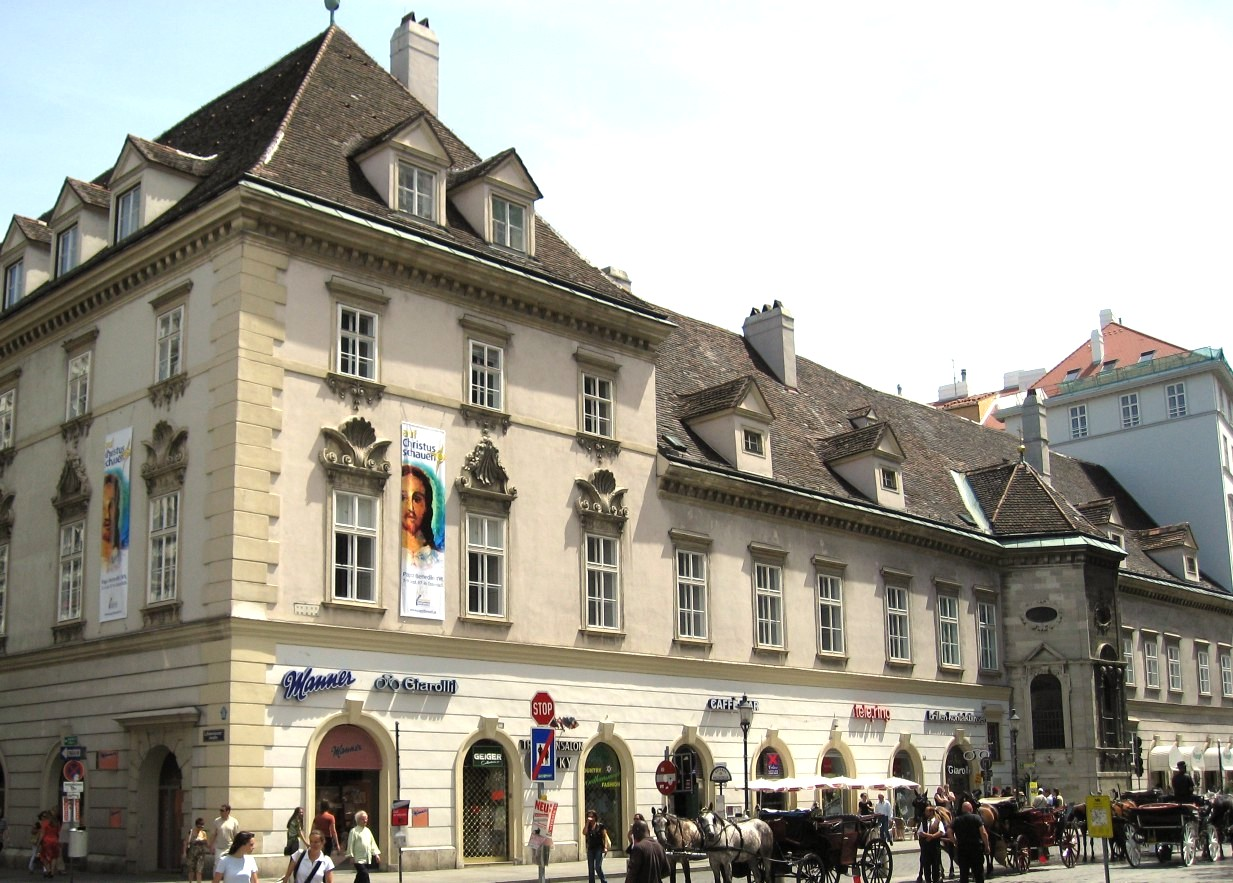
Episcopal palace of Vienna

The Episcopal Palace (German: Erzbischöfliches Palais) in Vienna, Austria is the seat of the Archbishop of Vienna. It is located in the centre of the city next to St. Stephen's Cathedral.

== History ==
The structure dates back to the middle ages. The current appearance came about in the baroque period of the 17th and 18th century.

== See also ==
- Episcopal Summer Palace, Bratislava
