= Jozef Moravčík =

Slovak politician

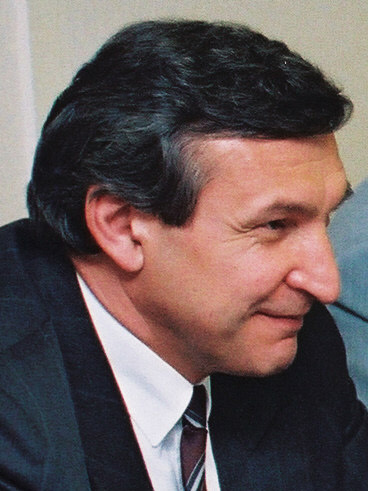
- Moravčík in 1993

Prime Minister of Slovakia
- In office 16 March 1994 – 13 December 1994
- President: Michal Kováč
- Preceded by: Vladimír Mečiar
- Succeeded by: Vladimír Mečiar

Mayor of Bratislava
- In office 1998–2002
- Preceded by: Peter Kresánek
- Succeeded by: Andrej Ďurkovský

Minister of Foreign Affairs
- In office 19 March 1993 – 14 March 1994
- President: Michal Kováč
- Preceded by: Milan Kňažko
- Succeeded by: Eduard Kukan

Personal details
- Born: 19 March 1945 (age 81) Očová, Slovak Republic
- Party: VPN (1990–1991); ODÚ (1991–1992); HZDS (1992–1994); DEÚS (1994–1995); DÚ (1995–2000)

Jozef Moravčík (born 19 March 1945) is a Slovak diplomat and political figure. He served as the prime minister of Slovakia from 16 March 1994 to 13 December 1994, and later as the Mayor of Bratislava.

Political offices
Preceded by Jiří Dienstbier	Minister of Foreign Affairs of Czechoslovakia; July–December 1992	Succeeded by Dissolution of Czechoslovakia
Preceded by Vladimír Mečiar	Prime Minister of Slovakia; March 1994 – December 1994	Succeeded by Vladimír Mečiar
Diplomatic posts
Preceded by Jiří Dienstbier; Czechoslovakia	Chairman-in-Office of the OSCE; 1992	Succeeded by Margaretha af Ugglas; Sweden
