= Peter Kresánek =

Slovak politician

Mayor of Bratislava
- In office 10 December 1990 – 1998
- Preceded by: Roman Hofbauer
- Succeeded by: Jozef Moravčík

Personal details
- Born: 1 January 1951 (age 75) Bratislava, Czechoslovakia
- Education: Comenius University in Bratislava

Peter Kresánek (born 1 January 1951 in Bratislava, Czechoslovakia) is a Slovak politician, former member of the Slovak parliament from 1998 to 2002 and former Mayor of Bratislava from 1990 to 1998.

== Early career ==
He attended SVŠ Vazovova in Bratislava (1966–1969) and the Faculty of Arts of the Comenius University in Bratislava (1969–1974). His desk was History of art and architecture. He is fluent in English, German and Russian.

== Political career ==
On 16 January 2000 Peter Kresánek was one of the co-founders of Slovak Democratic Christian Movement (Slovak: Slovenská demokratická a kresťanská únia (SDKÚ)). Before, he was a member of Christian Democratic Movement (Slovak: Kresťanskodemokratické hnutie (KDH)).

== Case little trains (Kauza vlaciky) ==
The case involved the buying of 35 leightweigt motor trains with ties to the Minister of Transport Jozef Macejka (SDKU) and the Prime Minister of Slovakia Mikuláš Dzurinda (SDKU). There was a police investigation but no one was charged. At a political level, Prime Minister Dzurinda recalled Jozef Macejka from his post of Minister.

A letter written by Peter Kresánek to the Prime Minister of Slovakia at that time Mikuláš Dzurinda leaked to the public. It contained the legendary line: "Gabo (note: a very familiar form of Gabriel (Palacka) who was the treasurer of Slovak Democratic and Christian Union – Democratic Party) takes the thing alternatively according to the fact that the background is the same for the party." Peter Kresánek was later expelled from his political party SDKU.

== Responsibility ==
As the Mayor of Bratislava Peter Kresánek supervised the sale of city buildings to various (at that time) opposition political parties, including the headquarters of SDĽ and DÚ. For example a similar demand by coalition party SNS was denied. The most scandalous sale was a large building on Žabotova street (today the headquarters of KDH), which was sold under non-transparent circumstances in 1997 for a fraction of its cost. Analysts from one company (P67 Value) estimated that Mayor Kresánek's additions to the contract alone cost the city 4 million crowns.

Kresánek is also politically responsible for bringing the public transport in Bratislava to the brink of collapse. Despite the city continuing to grow, under his tenure the bus service was reduced for the first time on 18 April 1994. On 5 September 1994 the bus lines were reduced again. The management of public transport under his tenure as Mayor of Bratislava resulted in a situation when in mid-1990s during peak hours it was common for people only being able to squeeze themselves into the second or third bus in a row at some busy bus stops. The undignified conditions in public transport and strong preference of personal transport within the city infrastructure coupled with the new economic freedom caused a surge in personal vehicles in Bratislava, creating transport problems for years to come.

== Personal ==
Kresánek is married with his wife Mária and has three children. He lives in Bratislava.
