= Andrea Turčanová =

Slovak politician (born 1966)

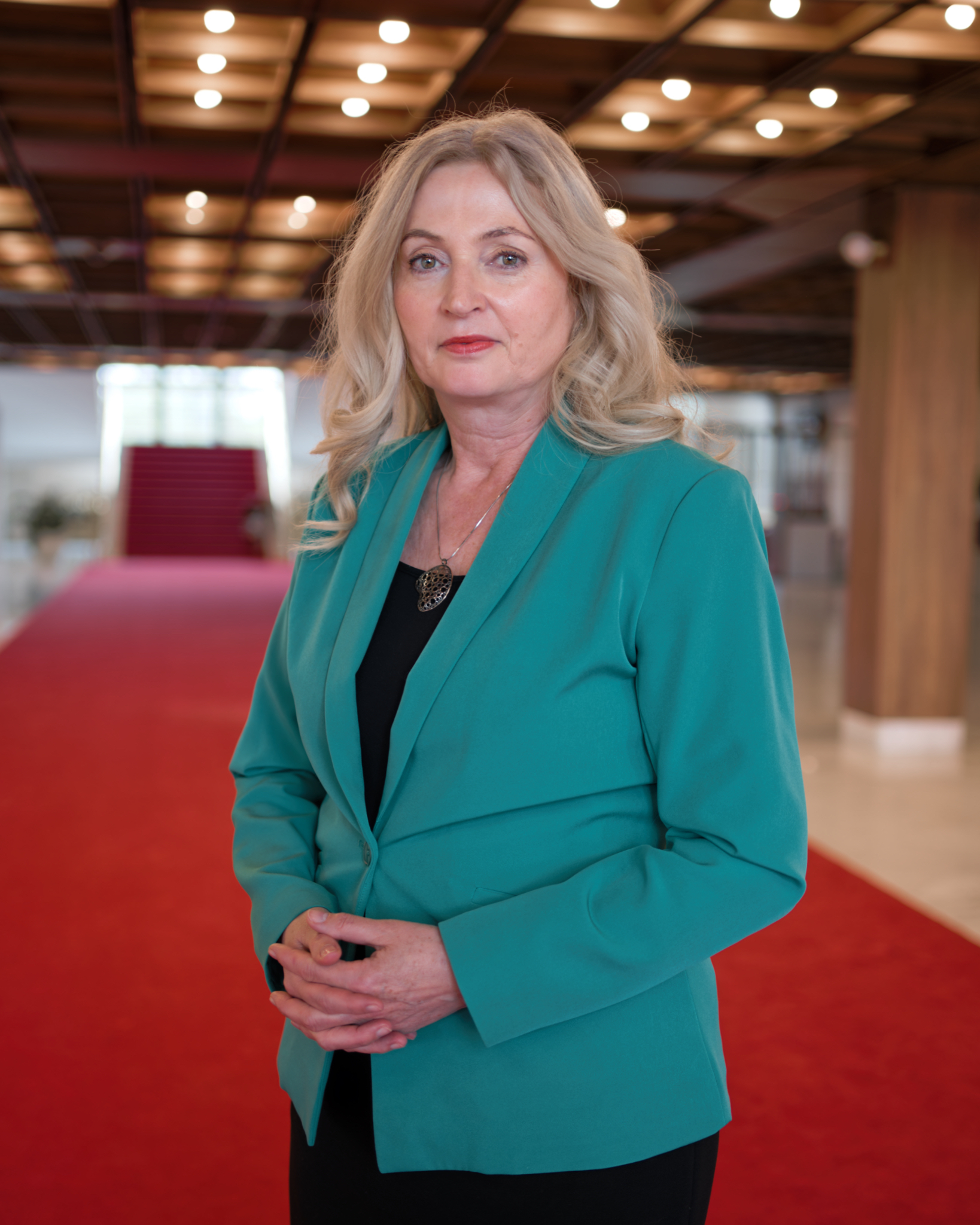
- Turčanová in 2024

Member of the National Council
- Incumbent
- Assumed office 25 October 2023

Mayor of Prešov
- In office 15 December 2014 – 23 November 2022
- Preceded by: Pavel Hagyari
- Succeeded by: František Oľha

Personal details
- Born: Andrea Polohová; 26 December 1966 (age 59) Martin, Czechoslovakia
- Party: Christian Democratic Movement
- Spouse: Ján Turčan
- Children: 5
- Education: Slovak University of Technology in Bratislava

Andrea Turčanová (née Polohová, born 26 December 1966) is a Slovak politician. Between 2014 and 2022 she was the mayor of Prešov. Since 2023, she has served as a Member of the National Council of Slovakia.

== Biography ==
Andrea Turčanová was born on 26 December 1966 in Martin. She grew up in Prešov. Turčanová studied chemical engineering at the Slovak University of Technology in Bratislava but chose a career in social work, working for the Prešov municipality and later as a director of a nursing home.

== Political career ==
Turčanová has been a member of the Christian Democratic Movement since 2006. From 2009 to 2013 she served as a deputy in the Prešov regional assembly. In 2014 she became the first female to become the mayor of Prešov, a post she held for two terms until 2022. In 2023 Slovak parliamentary election she gained a seat in the National Council.

== Personal life ==
Turčanová is married to a retired military officer Ján Turčan. They have five children.
