= Milan Ftáčnik =

Slovak politician (1956–2021)

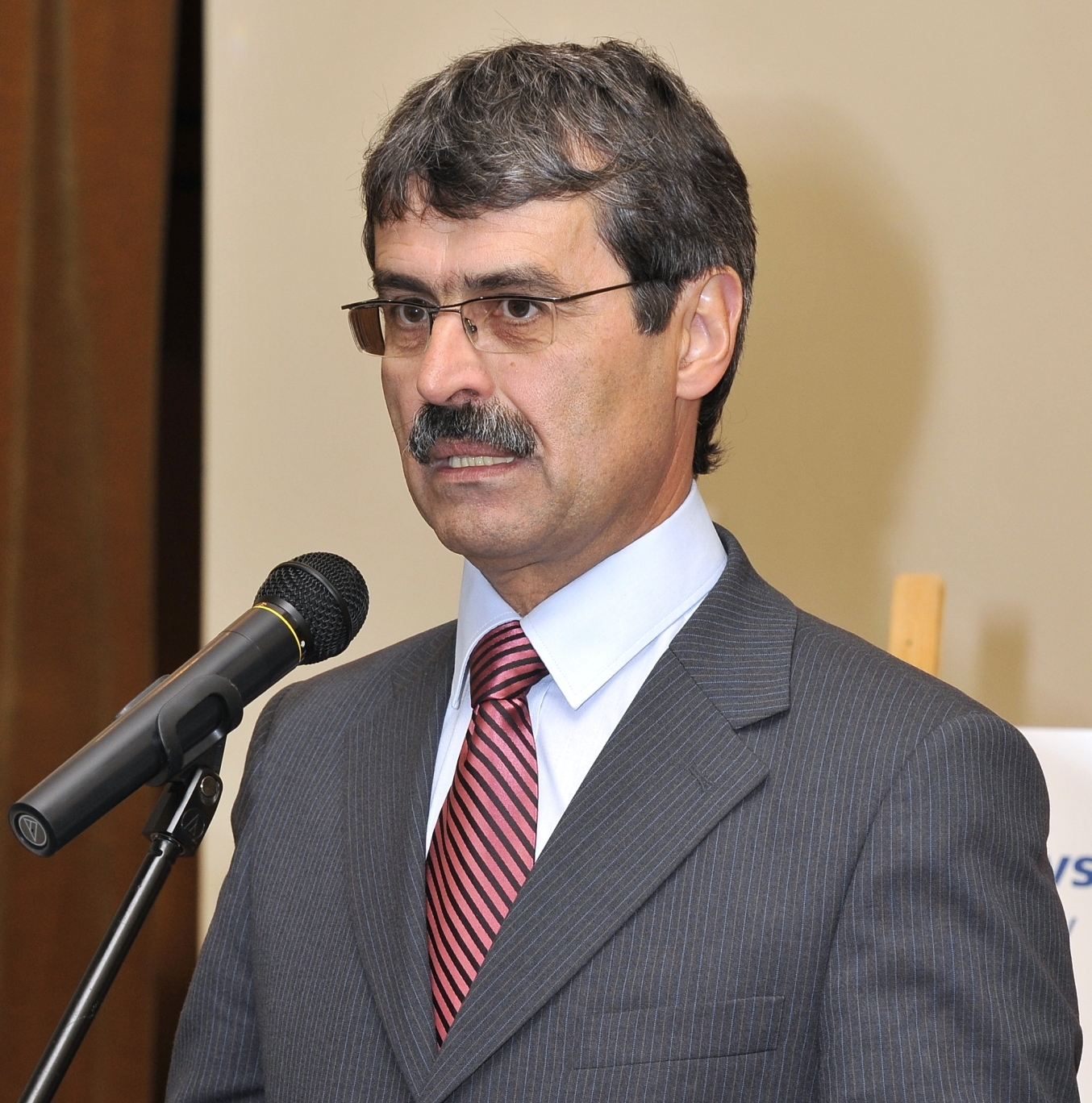

Minister of Education, Science, Research and Sport
- In office 30 October 1998 – 17 April 2002
- Preceded by: Eva Slavkovská
- Succeeded by: Peter Ponický

Mayor of Bratislava
- In office 21 December 2010 – 11 December 2014
- Preceded by: Andrej Ďurkovský
- Succeeded by: Ivo Nesrovnal

Mayor of Petržalka (Borough of Bratislava)
- In office 2 December 2006 – 27 November 2010
- Succeeded by: Vladimír Bajan

Personal details
- Born: 30 October 1956 Bratislava, Czechoslovakia
- Died: 13 May 2021 (aged 64)
- Party: Independent
- Education: Comenius University
- Website: Official website for 2010 mayor election

Milan Ftáčnik (30 October 1956 – 13 May 2021) was a Slovak politician, Minister of Education of the Slovak Republic from 1998 to 2002 and Mayor of Bratislava from 2010 to 2014. Prior to this he was also Mayor of Petržalka from 2006 to 2010.

He was also an associate professor at the Department of Applied Informatics at the Faculty of Mathematics, Physics and Informatics of Comenius University in Bratislava. He was also a chairman on the board of trustees of STU.

Ftáčnik was often described as a left-wing politician.

He was the older brother of chess grandmaster Ľubomír Ftáčnik.
