= Mayor of Bratislava =

The mayor of Bratislava (Slovak: Primátor Bratislavy) is the city's highest executive authority and statutory representative. The mayor represents the city externally, signs ordinances and contracts, and chairs meetings of the City Council. The mayor's office is located in the Primate's Palace. Since 2018 the office has been held by Matúš Vallo, an architect.

== List of mayors of Bratislava ==
=== Richtári of Pressburg (1280–1879) ===
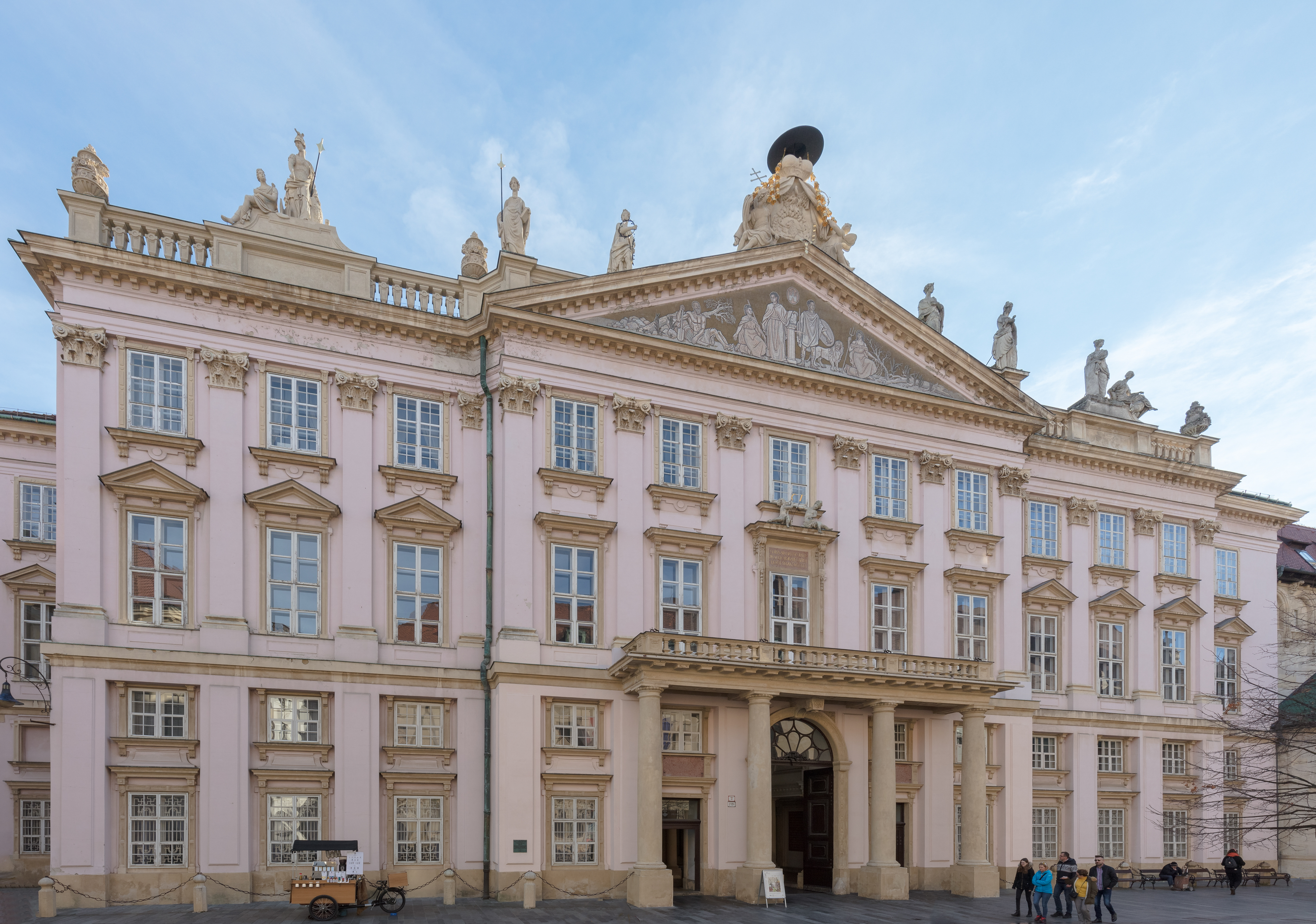
Primate's Palace, current seat of the Mayor

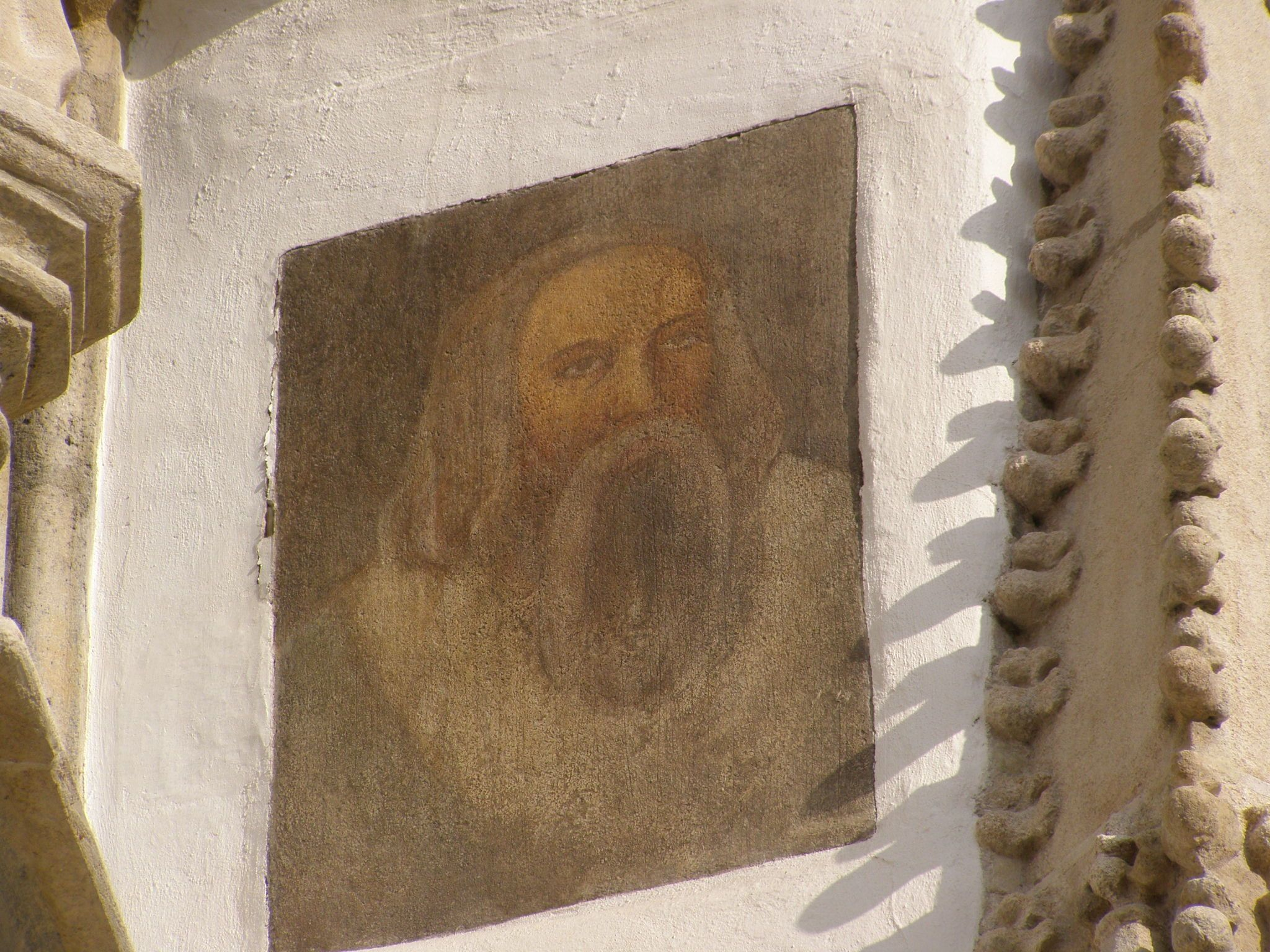
A painting of what is believed to be Jacobus, the first Mayor of the city

- 1280 – Jacobus
- 1287 – Tirwardus
- 1288 – Jacobus
- 1302 – Hertlin
- 1314 – Hertlo
- 1324 – Bernhardus
- 1347 – Jacobus
- 1348 – Comes Jacobus
- 1352 – Jacus
- 1356 – Comes Jacus
- 1357 – Jacobus
- 1361 – Jacobus fil. Nikolai
- 1365 – Comes Jacobus
- 1371 – Jacob fil. Nikolai
- 1375 – Stephanus a Henricus
- 1377 – Henricus
- 1379 – Paul Spitzer
- 1389 – Mert Kirchenknopf together with Paul Spitzer
- 1390 – Nicolaus Plichendechel
- 1391 – Paul Spitzer
- 1396 – Paul Spitzer together with Ulrich Rauchwarter
- 1400 – Bernhardt Scharrach
- 1401 – Ulrich Rauchenwarter
- 1412 – Konrad Kitzmägl together with Peter Liszt
- 1413 – Wenig Gillig
- 1414 – Johannes Eilausenrock
- 1415 – Johannes Eilausenrock together with Andreas Treletsch
- 1419 – Andreas Pernhaitl
- 1423 – Johannes Eilausenrock
- 1424 – Konrad Kitzmagen
- 1427 – Johann Pauer
- 1428 – Johann Pauer together with Andreas Pernhaitl
- 1430 – Johann Pauer
- 1432 – Johannes Eilausenrock
- 1433 – Bartholomäus Scharrach
- 1435 – Stefan List
- 1437 – Stefan Ranes
- 1441 – Hans Eilausenrock
- 1442 – Ludwig Kunigsfelder
- 1444 – Ludwig Kunigsfelder together with Stephan List
- 1445 – Stefan Ranes
- 1447 – Ludwig Kunigsfelder
- 1450 – Peter Jungetl together with Ludwig Kunigsfelder
- 1453 – Stefan Gmaitl
- 1458 – Stefan Gmaitl together with Wenzel Bernhaitl
- 1461 – Ludwig Kunigsfelder
- 1465 – Stefan Gmaitl
- 1466 – Stefan Ranes
- 1467 – Ludwig Kunigsfelder
- 1469 – Stefan Ranes
- 1470 – Hans Pottenberger
- 1473 – Hans Karner
- 1475 – Johann Pottenberger
- 1477 – Hans Karner
- 1478 – Andreas Holtzer
- 1481 – Georg Schönperg
- 1484 – Andreas Holtzer
- 1491 – Martin Rosentaler
- 1494 – Peter Kraitz together with Jakob Aigner
- 1499 – Peter Kraitz together with Jakob Aigner together with Jakob Pellifex
- 1500 – Wolfgang Forster
- 1502 – Mathias Paier
- 1503 – Wolfgang Thailenkas
- 1506 – Wolfgang Forster
- 1508 – Johann Lachenperger
- 1509 – Wolfgang Forster
- 1510 – Johann Lachenperger
- 1513 – Michael Maixner
- 1517 – Caspar Leupold
- 1519 – Wolfgang Forster
- 1523 – Caspar Leupold
- 1524 – Michael Fischer
- 1531 – Michael Klee
- 1538 – Blasius Beham
- 1545 – Johann Berghammer
- 1547 – Blasius Beham
- 1550 – Thomas Reichenthaler
- 1552 – Johann Fischer
- 1555 – Michael Klee
- 1556 – Johann Fischer
- 1557 – Martin Aichinger
- 1559 – Johann Fischer
- 1560 – Caspar Hainrich
- 1561 – Wolfgang Kögl
- 1563 – Johann Fischer
- 1564 – Sigismund Luettenperger
- 1566 – Wolfgang Kögl
- 1567 – Johann Fischer
- 1568 – Wolfgang Kögl
- 1569 – Sigismud Luettenperger
- 1571 – Johann Fischer
- 1572 – Caspar Lichtenberger
- 1574 – Vitus Knap
- 1576 - Mathias Aichinger
- 1577 – Georg Eisenreich
- 1581 – Vitus Knap
- 1583 – Georg Eisenreich
- 1584 – Caspar Lichtenberger
- 1585 – Lukas Maurach
- 1587 – Felician Schmugger
- 1589 – Zacharius Götzl
- 1592 – Mathias Partinger
- 1596 – Zacharius Götzl
- 1599 – Christof Tschatter
- 1601 – Martin Schödl
- 1603 – Johann Offner
- 1608 – Christof Tschatter
- 1610 – Martin Schödl
- 1611 – Rudolf Maurach
- 1613 – Johann Offner
- 1615 – Johann Hertl
- 1618 – Johann Schödl
- 1621 – Johann Hartl
- 1627 – Christof Partinger
- 1631 - Michael Moniz
- 1635 – Michael Földessy
- 1637 – Michael Jakob Szeleczky
- 1640 – Johannes Cellarius
- 1643 – Georg Tallyán
- 1646 – Andreas Segner
- 1648 – Jakob Prein
- 1649 – Gregor Tallyán
- 1651 – Martin Schödl
- 1653 – Gregor Tallyán
- 1656 – Mathias Tutzenzhaler
- 1658 – Andreas Segner
- 1660 – Georg Liebhart
- 1662 – Andreas Segner
- 1664 – Gregor Tallyán
- 1666 – Christoph Spindler
- 1668 – Gregor Tallyán
- 1669 – Andreas Baán
- 1670 – Thobias Plankenauer
- 1673 – Benedikt Pakay
- 1675 – Stefan Battay
- 1677 – Georg Hilscher
- 1678 – Georgius de Somogy
- 1680 – Michael Sambokréty
- 1684 – Georg Somogy
- 1687 – Michael Sambokréty
- 1689 – Nikolaus Straus
- 1692 – Josef Segner
- 1694 – Michael Sambokréty
- 1696 – Christof Burgstaller
- 1698 – Christof Spindler
- 1700 – Jakob Segner
- 1702 – Michael Sambokréty
- 1707 – Christof Burgstaller
- 1710 – Paul Kögl
- 1714 – Christof Burgstaller
- 1716 – Stefan Gostlony
- 1718 – Christof Burgstaller
- 1721 – Nikolaus Szenthe
- 1723 – Gabriel Skaricza
- 1724 – Michael Miklos
- 1726 – Johann Trummer
- 1728 – Christof Burgstaller
- 1730 – Johann Trummer
- 1732 – Michael Miklos
- 1733 – Christof Burgstaller
- 1734 – Emerich Csiba
- 1736 – Andreas Segner
- 1738 – Georg Kubótzy
- 1740 – Christof Burgstaller
- 1742 – Georg Kubótzy
- 1744 – Christof Málik
- 1746 – Christoph Veingruber
- 1748 – Andreas Segner
- 1750 – Georg Kubótzy
- 1751 – Franciscus Nozdrovitzky
- 1752 – Christof Málik
- 1754 – Franciscus Nozdrovitzky
- 1756 – Andreas Segner
- 1757 – Christof Málik
- 1758 – Franciscus Nozdrovitzky
- 1760 – Michael Gombos
- 1762 – Carol. Kegly together with Stephan Várady
- 1764 - Stephan Várady
- 1766 – Michael Gombos
- 1768 – Alex. Kevitzky
- 1770 – Carol. Vilh. Málik
- 1772 – Alex. Kevitzky
- 1774 – Michael Gombos
- 1776 – Alex. Kevitzky
- 1778 – Emer. Mikoviny
- 1784 – Josef Stettner
- 1788 – Georg. Kajdacsy
- 1790 – Joan. Vallovics
- 1793 – Joan. Stettner
- 1798 – Josef Kálna
- 1801 – Josef Karner
- 1803 – Josef Kálna
- 1806 – Josef Schmidt
- 1808 – Josef Sánta
- 1810 – Georg. Albrecht
- 1812 – Petrus Mottko
- 1815 – Paulus Kochmeister
- 1818 – Petrus Mottko
- 1821 – Jonas Kettner
- 1824 – Carolus Jäger
- 1827 – Jonas Kettner
- 1830 – Carolus Jäger
- 1839 – Josef Bajcsy
- 1861 – Ernest Hauszer (until November 21, 1861), then Mathias Dobrovits
- 1862 – Mathias Dobrovits
- 1867 - Henrich Justi
- 1879 – Mór Gottl

After 1879 the title of richtár (lat. judex, eng. mayor) is replaced by mešťanosta (lat. consules).

=== Mešťanostovia of Pressburg/Bratislava (1884–1945) ===
- 1884 – Mór Gottl (until April 9, 1884), then Carolus Mergl
- 1889 – Gustav Dröxler
- 1898 – Paulus Taller
- 1900 – Tivadar Brolly
- 1918 – Tóder Kumlik
- 1919 – Richard Kánya
- 1920 – Dr. Viktor Duschek
- 1922 – Dr. Emerich Zimmer
- 1923 – Dr. Ľudovít Okánik (1929 resigned)
- 1930 – Dr. Vladimír Krno (until 1933)
- 1939 – Dr. Belo Kováč
- 1944 – Dr. Belo Kováč (until May 3, 1944), then Dr. Štefan Ravasz
- 1945 – Dr. Štefan Ravasz (until April 6, 1945)
- 1945 – Prof. Dr. Karol Koch (until April 8, 1945) (predseda NV)
- 1945 – Štefan Bašťovanský (until April 10, 1945) (predseda NV)
- 1945 – Dr. Štefan Ravasz gives his office of mešťanosta to the Predsedníctvo NV. The office is renamed primátor in Slovak.

=== Primátori of Bratislava (1946—present) ===
- 1946 – Dr. Anton Vasek (until October 4, 1946), then Dr. Josef Kyselý
- 1948 – Dr. Josef Kyselý (until February 20, 1948) then Dr. Martin Kuban (until February 27, 1948), then Dr. Anton Vasek
- 1950 – 1952 – Ladislav Kurták
- 1952 – 1954 – Ján Šrámek
- 1954 – Ján Šrámek (until May 16, 1954), then František Čáp (1954 – 1957)
- 1957 – František Čáp (until May 19, 1957), then Ján Šebík (1957 – 1961)
- 1961 – 1964 – Pavol Tomáš
- 1964 – 1969 – Ing. arch. Milan Hladký
- 1969 – Ing. arch. Milan Hladký (until February 26, 1969), then Štefan Jardanházy (until December 12, 1969), then Ing. Ladislav Martinák
- 1970 – 1986 – Ing. Ladislav Martinák
- 1986 – 1990 – Ing. Štefan Barták
- 1990 – Ing. Štefan Barták (until March 1, 1990), then Ing. Roman Hofbauer (until December 10, 1990), then Mgr. Peter Kresánek
- 1990 – 1998 – Mgr. Peter Kresánek
- 1998 – 2002 – JUDr. Jozef Moravčík
- 2002 – 2010 – Ing. Andrej Ďurkovský
- 2010 – 2014 – Doc. RNDr. Milan Ftáčnik, CSc.
- 2014 – 2018 – JUDr. Ivo Nesrovnal, LL.M.
- 2018 – present – Ing. arch. Matúš Vallo

== Sources ==
- List of Mayors of Bratislava from the official city homepage in Slovak
- List of Mayors of Bratislava in Slovak
