= Ivo Nesrovnal =

Slovak politician

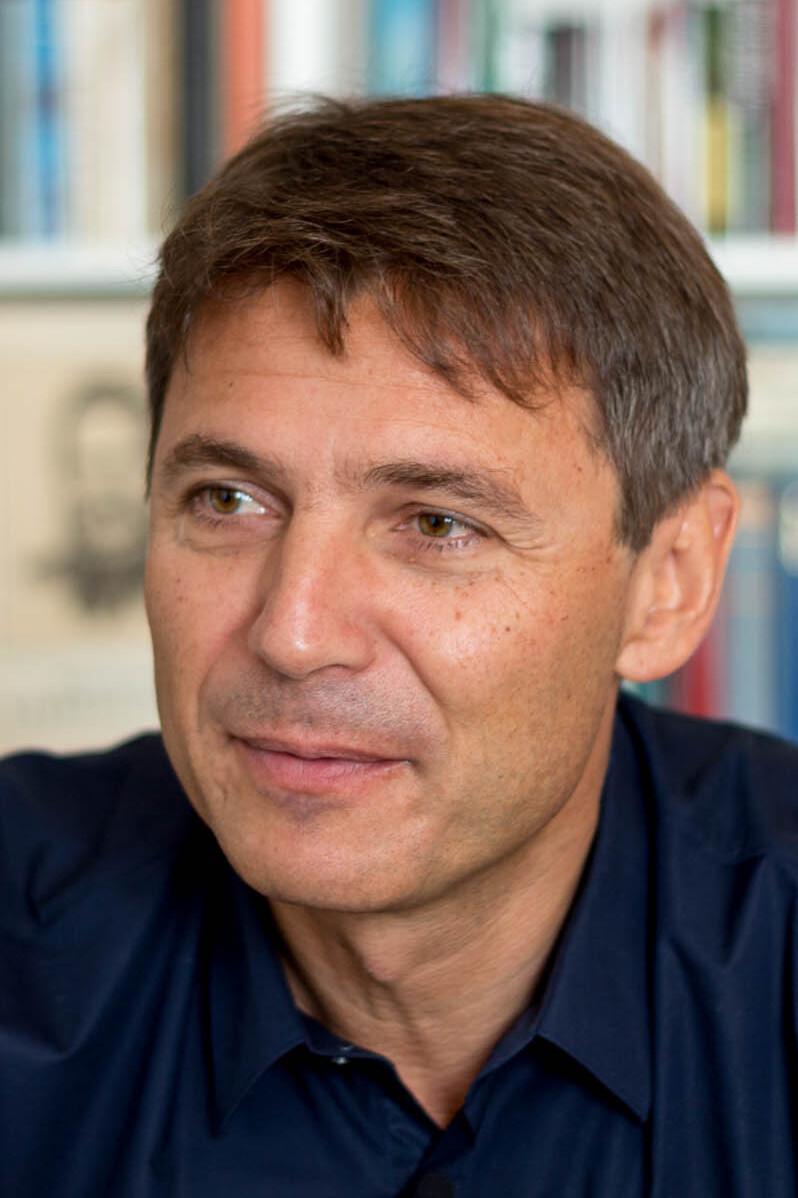

Mayor of Bratislava
- In office 11 December 2014 – 7 December 2018
- Preceded by: Milan Ftáčnik
- Succeeded by: Matúš Vallo

Personal details
- Born: 19 May 1964 (age 62) Bratislava, Slovakia
- Party: Independent (since 2014); Slovak Democratic and Christian Union – Democratic Party (until 2014)
- Profession: Lawyer; Politician

Ivo Nesrovnal, LL.M. (Slovak pronunciation: [ˈiʋɔ ˈnesrɔvnal], born 19 May 1964) is a Slovak lawyer and politician. He served as the Mayor of Bratislava from 2014 to 2018.

== Career ==
Nesrovnal left SDKÚ-DS party in August 2014 and decided to run for Bratislava mayor. He received 50630 votes (39.3%), about 10000 more than then-mayor Milan Ftáčnik (31.4%). Nesrovnal ran for the post again in the 2018 Slovak municipal elections as an independent candidate. Having received 18.4% of the votes and the third place, he was defeated by Matúš Vallo, who received 36.5% of the votes. In 2020, Nesrovnal served as chairman of the Supervisory Board of PPF Group.
