= Matúš Vallo =

Slovak politician, current mayor of Bratislava

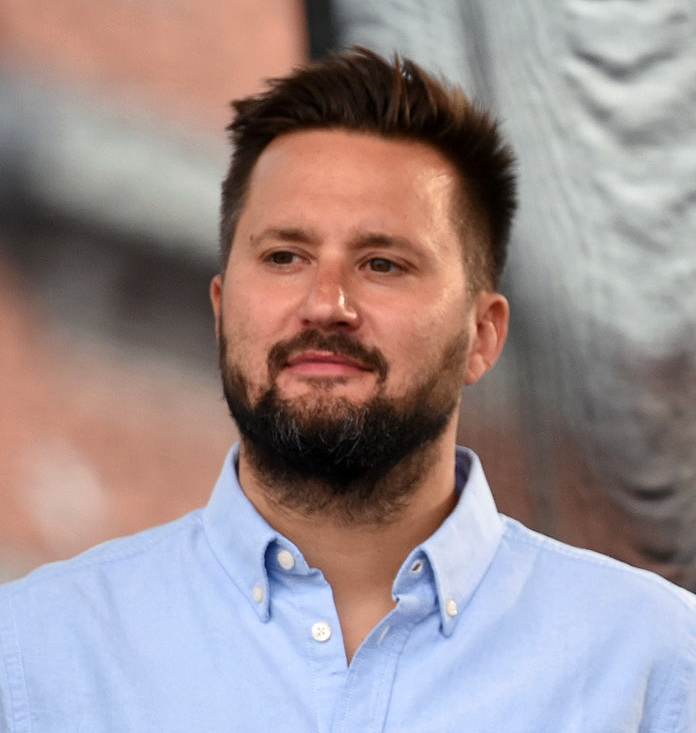
- Vallo in 2017

Mayor of Bratislava
- Incumbent
- Assumed office 7 December 2018
- Preceded by: Ivo Nesrovnal

Personal details
- Born: 18 September 1977 (age 49) Bratislava, Czechoslovakia
- Party: Team Bratislava (2022–present)
- Spouse: Linda Vallová
- Children: 1
- Education: Slovak University of Technology in Bratislava (Ing.); Columbia University

Matúš Vallo (born 18 September 1977) is a Slovak politician, architect, urban activist and musician who has served as Mayor of Bratislava since 2018. First elected as an independent politician, he was re-elected in 2022 and 2026 as the candidate of his local party Team Bratislava.

== Early life and education ==
Vallo was born on 18 September 1977 in Bratislava. went to secondary school in Rome, Italy. His interest in art and geometry led him to study architecture, and he graduated from the Faculty of Architecture at the Slovak University of Technology in Bratislava in 2004. Between 2010 and 2011, Vallo received a Fulbright research scholarship to attend Columbia University where he worked on a project called City Interventions at the Columbia Laboratory for Architectural Broadcasting.

== Mayor of Bratislava ==
=== Elections ===
==== 2018 ====
Vallo was the first candidate to run for Bratislava mayor in the 2018 Slovak local elections. Vallo ran for the post as an independent, but with the help and strong support of non-parliamentary political parties Progressive Slovakia and Spolu backed by a group of experts called Team Vallo who have previously worked on project to improve the quality of life in Bratislava which resulted in a book, Plán Bratislava having been published.

Vallo's main rivals were Václav Mika, the former director of RTVS, the public broadcaster, and the then-mayor Ivo Nesrovnal. During the campaign, he vowed to improve the way the city administration communicates with citizens, make processes more transparent and engage more with the residents. Vallo criticised then-mayor Nesrovnal for his inability to come to agreement with the members of the city council, leading to the deadlock in implementing the new parking policy, stagnating improvement of the cycling infrastructure and other issues. He won the election with 36.5% of the vote. He was officially sworn into office as Bratislava's mayor on 7 December 2018.

==== 2022 ====
In the 2022 Slovak local elections, Vallo ran as the candidate of his own local party Team Bratislava, with the support of Freedom and Solidarity and Progressive Slovakia. He was re-elected with 60.2% of the vote, defeating Rudolf Kusý.

==== 2026 ====
In the October 2026 local elections, Vallo ran for a third term with the support of Team Bratislava, Progressive Slovakia, Freedom and Solidarity and the Democrats. He received 121,846 votes (64.36%), ahead of the transport minister Jozef Ráž with 61,183 votes (32.32%); turnout in Bratislava was 47.37%.

=== Policies ===
==== Transport and parking policies ====
One of the first policies Vallo started to work on was the parking policy delays with the implementation of which he has previously criticised his predecessor for. His aim was decide on the framework the city borough and the city council will build upon, in the first half of 2019 The original proposal included residential parking zones in locations decided by the city boroughs.

The proposal caused some backlash, after which some changes had been made. The cost of the yearly parking card was reduced to €39; additional €10 a year allow parking in other boroughs for a maximum of two hours. In October 2020, the launch of the parking policy was announced to be delayed until autumn 2021.

==== Metropolitan Institute of Bratislava ====
Vallo initiated the establishment of the Metropolitan Institute of Bratislava. The Metropolitan institute of Bratislava has developed the manifest and the manual for public spaces.

==== Planning permissions review ====
Under Vallo, the review of planning permission became stricter, with more projects being rejected for ignoring or bypassing requirements.

==== Public space revitalisation and greenery initiatives ====
The Živé námestie (‘Vivid Square’) project concerns three central squares — SNP Square, Velvet Revolution Square and Kamenné Námestie — which are to be redeveloped as a unified pedestrian-priority zone with climate-adapted green infrastructure and public seating, based on a design by German architects that won a competition announced in April 2019. According to the Metropolitan Institute of Bratislava, the three squares cover nearly 35,000 m², making it the largest public-space redevelopment in Bratislava since the 1970s.

In 2020, the city announced plans to plant 10,000 new trees, with the stated aims of improving air quality, shading, biodiversity and stormwater retention.

In 2021, Vallo’s administration initiated the Živé miesta (‘Vivid places’) scheme, earmarking €14.3 million to renovate more than 25 public spaces across Bratislava, including parks on Žilinská, Krížna–Karadžičova, Legionárska, Husova, Dunajská and the area beneath SNP Bridge. Early completed projects under Vivid Places included a small park on Židovská (a so-called ‘pocket park’), seating and greenery improvements on Štúrova, and low-cost temporary interventions on Klobučnícka and Treskoňova featuring potted trees, seating and greenery, intended to be completed quickly and to remain compatible with later comprehensive redesigns.

==== Other ====
In December 2019, together with the mayors of the other Visegrád Group capitals, Vallo signed the Pact of Free Cities, which commits the signatories to "common values of freedom, human dignity, democracy, equality, rule of law, social justice, tolerance and cultural diversity". Vallo supports the Bratislava Pride and has attended it both during his mayoral term and before.

== Personal life ==
Vallo is married with one child. He is a grandson of the poet and politician Miroslav Válek, who served as Minister of Culture of the Slovak Socialist Republic from 1969 to 1988.
