= Jakubovany, Sabinov District =

Municipality of Slovakia

Jakubovany
- Municipality
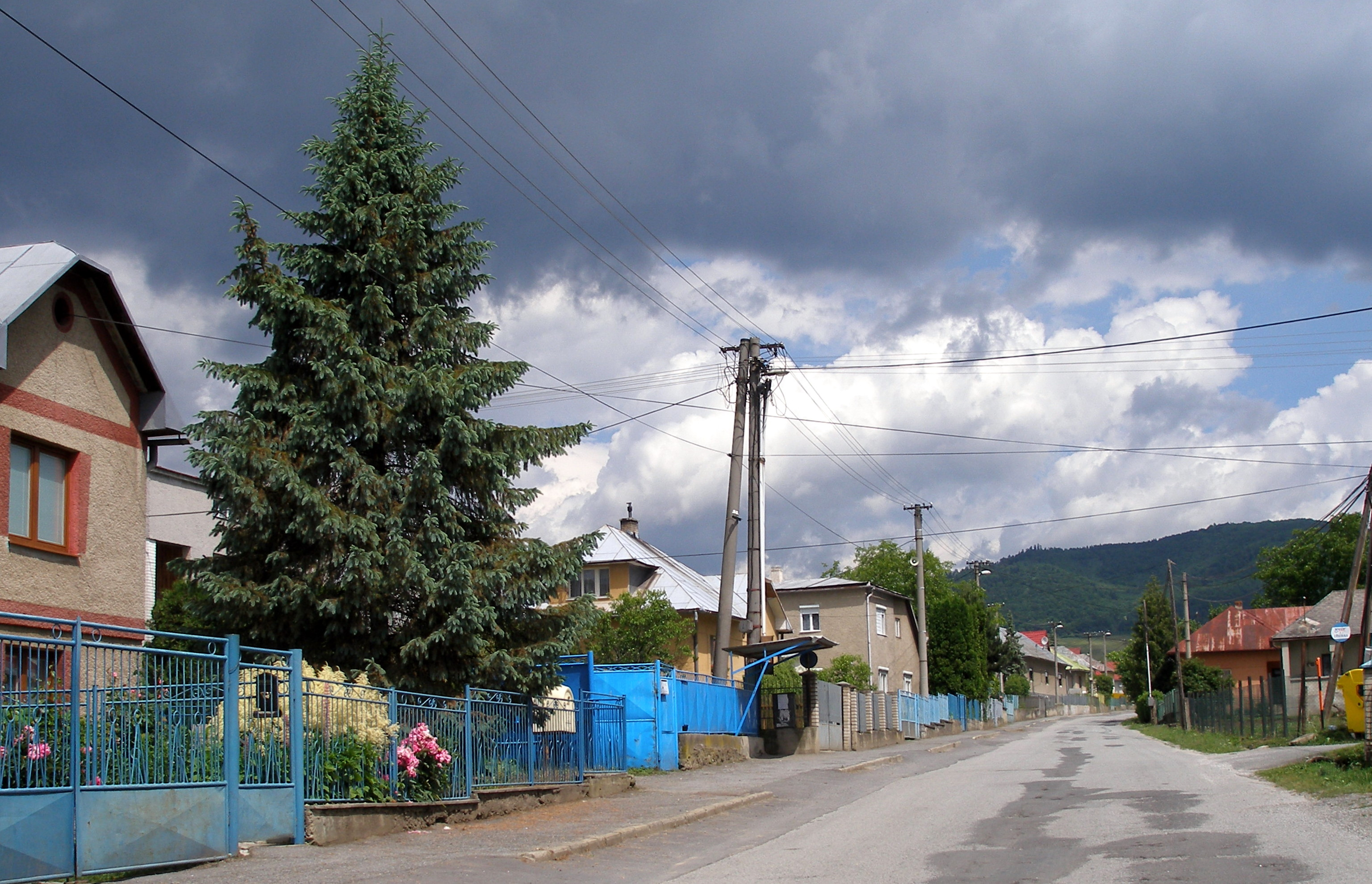

- Flag

- Location of Jakubovany in the Prešov Region Location of Jakubovany in Slovakia
- Coordinates: 49.11°N 21.14°E
- Country: Slovakia
- Region: Prešov Region
- District: Sabinov District
- First mentioned: 1314

Area
  - Total: 10.81 km^{2} (4.17 sq mi)
- Elevation: 416 m (1,365 ft)

Population (2025)
  - Total: 972
- Time zone: UTC+1 (CET)
  - Summer (DST): UTC+2 (CEST)
- Postal code: 830 1
- Area code: +421 51
- Vehicle registration plate (until 2022): SB
- Website: www.obecjakubovany.sk

Uherské Jakubovany (Hungarian: Magyarjakabfalva, German: Jakobsdorf) is a village and municipality in Sabinov District in the Prešov Region of north-eastern Slovakia.

== History ==
The village was first mentioned in 1314, when Charles I of Hungary gave it to the Thököly family.

== Geography ==
The municipality lies at an altitude of 416 metres (1,365 ft) and covers an area of 10.81 km^{2} (4.17 sq mi) (2025).

== Population ==
Population statistic (10 years)
Year	1995	2005	2015	2025
Count	881	931	966	972
Difference		+5.67%	+3.75%	+0.62%

Population statistic
Year	2024	2025
Count	959	972
Difference		+1.35%

It has a population of 972 people (31 December 2025).

=== Ethnicity ===
Census 2021 (1+ %)
Ethnicity	Number	Fraction
Slovak	942	99.47%
Total	947	

In year 2021 was 947 people by ethnicity 942 as Slovak, 4 as Not found out, 2 as Rusyn, 1 as Czech, 1 as Romani and 1 as German.

Note on population: The difference values of population numbers in the table "Population statistic" and in the sections "Ethnicity" & "Religion" is caused by the use of various statistical methods.

=== Religion ===
Census 2021 (1+ %)
Religion	Number	Fraction
Roman Catholic Church	837	88.38%
None	39	4.12%
Greek Catholic Church	35	3.7%
Evangelical Church	26	2.75%
Total	947	

In year 2021 was 947 people by religion 837 from Roman Catholic Church, 39 from None, 35 from Greek Catholic Church, 26 from Evangelical Church, 5 from Eastern Orthodox Church, 2 from Not found out, 1 from Jehovah's Witnesses, 1 from Islam and 1 from Apostolic Church.

== Genealogical resources ==
The records for genealogical research are available at the state archive "Statny Archiv in Presov, Slovakia"

- Roman Catholic church records (births/marriages/deaths): 1676-1895 (parish B)
- Greek Catholic church records (births/marriages/deaths): 1846-1895 (parish B)

== See also ==
- List of municipalities and towns in Slovakia
