= Chorváty =

Chorváty Tornahorváti
- Municipality
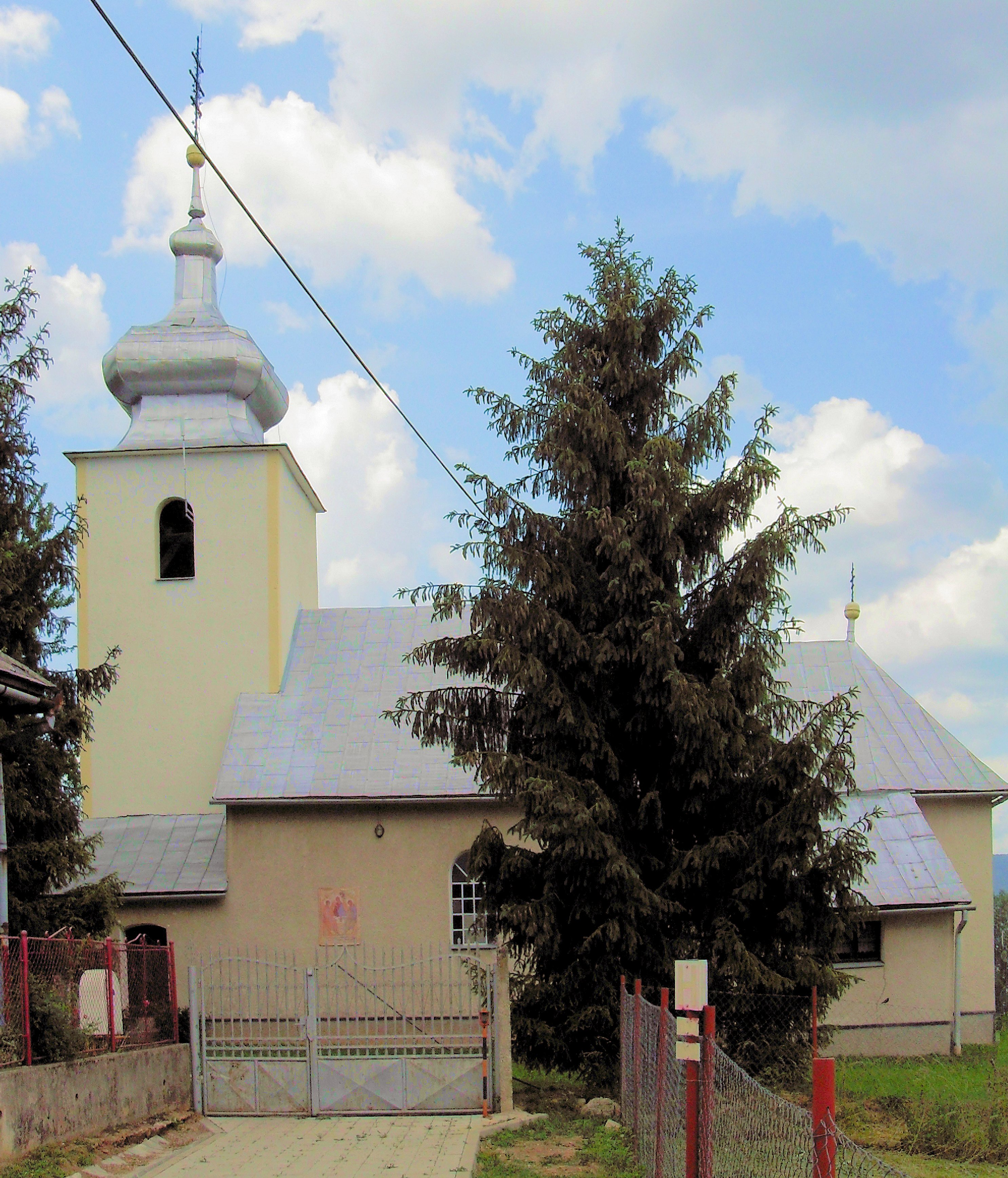

- Flag

- Location of Chorváty in the Košice Region Location of Chorváty in Slovakia
- Coordinates: 48.57°N 20.88°E
- Country: Slovakia
- Region: Košice Region
- District: Košice-okolie District
- First mentioned: 1247

Government
  - Mayor: Ladislav Juhász (Ind.)

Area
  - Total: 3.30 km^{2} (1.27 sq mi)
- Elevation: 196 m (643 ft)

Population (2025)
  - Total: 95
- Time zone: UTC+1 (CET)
  - Summer (DST): UTC+2 (CEST)
- Postal code: 440 4
- Area code: +421 55
- Vehicle registration plate (until 2022): KS
- Website: chorvaty.sk

Chorváty (Hungarian: Tornahorváti, Torna-Horváti) is a village and municipality in the Greater Košice District in the Košice Region of eastern Slovakia.

== History ==
Historically, the village was first mentioned in 1247. The name means "Croatian" most likely suggesting to the White Croats.

== Geography ==
The municipality lies at an altitude of 196 metres (643 ft) and covers an area of 3.30 km^{2} (1.27 sq mi) (2025).

== Population ==
Population statistic (10 years)
Year	1995	2005	2015	2025
Count	112	93	100	95
Difference		−16.96%	+7.52%	−5%

Population statistic
Year	2024	2025
Count	99	95
Difference		−4.04%

It has a population of 95 people (31 December 2025).

=== Ethnicity ===
Census 2021 (1+ %)
Ethnicity	Number	Fraction
Hungarian	82	79.61%
Slovak	22	21.35%
Romani	6	5.82%
Not found out	4	3.88%
Total	103	

In year 2021 was 103 people by ethnicity 82 as Hungarian, 22 as Slovak, 6 as Romani and 4 as Not found out.

Note on population: The difference values of population numbers in the table "Population statistic" and in the sections "Ethnicity" & "Religion" is caused by the use of various statistical methods.

=== Religion ===
Census 2021 (1+ %)
Religion	Number	Fraction
Roman Catholic Church	64	62.14%
Greek Catholic Church	28	27.18%
Calvinist Church	4	3.88%
Not found out	3	2.91%
None	3	2.91%
Total	103	

In year 2021 was 103 people by religion 64 from Roman Catholic Church, 28 from Greek Catholic Church, 4 from Calvinist Church, 3 from Not found out, 3 from None and 1 from Evangelical Church.

== Genealogical resources ==
The records for genealogical research are available at the state archive "Statny Archiv in Kosice, Slovakia"

- Greek Catholic church records (births/marriages/deaths): 1760-1945 (parish A)

== See also ==
- List of municipalities and towns in Slovakia
