= 2022 Slovak local elections =

The 2022 Slovak local elections were held on 29 October 2022. For the first time, regional elections took place simultaneously.
